= Rhyme royal =

Poetic stanza, rhyming ABABBCC

Rhyme royal (or rime royal) is a rhyming stanza form that was introduced to English poetry by Geoffrey Chaucer. The form enjoyed significant success in the fifteenth century and into the sixteenth century. It has had a more subdued but continuing influence on English verse in more recent centuries.

== Form ==
The rhyme royal stanza consists of seven lines, usually in iambic pentameter. The rhyme scheme is $\mathrm{ABABBCC}$. In practice, the stanza can be constructed either as a tercet and two couplets ($\mathrm{ABA \,\, BB \,\, CC}$) or a quatrain and a tercet ($\mathrm{ABAB \,\, BCC}$). This allows for variety, especially when the form is used for longer narrative poems.

Thanks to the form's spaciousness compared to quatrains, and the sense of conclusion offered by the couplet of new rhyme in the sixth and seventh lines, it is thought to have a cyclical, reflective quality.

== History ==
=== Introduction and success ===
Chaucer first used the rhyme royal stanza in his long poems Troilus and Criseyde and the Parlement of Foules, written in the later fourteenth century. He also used it for four of the Canterbury Tales: the Man of Law's Tale, the Prioress' Tale, the Clerk's Tale, and the Second Nun's Tale, and in a number of shorter lyrics. He may have adapted the form from a French ballade stanza or from the Italian ottava rima, with the omission of the fifth line. Chaucer's contemporary and acquaintance John Gower used rhyme royal in In Praise of Peace and in one short part, the lover's supplication, in Confessio Amantis. In the fifteenth century, rhyme royal would go on to become a standard narrative form in later Middle English poetry alongside the rhyming couplet.

James I of Scotland used rhyme royal for his Chaucerian poem The Kingis Quair. The name of the stanza might derive from this royal use, though it has also been argued that the stanza name comes from the use of poetry for addresses to royalty in festivals and ceremonies. English and Scottish poets were greatly influenced by Chaucer in the century after his death and many made use of the form in at least some of their works. John Lydgate used the stanza for many of his occasional and love poems, and throughout his 36,000-line Fall of Princes. Rhyme royal was also chosen by poets such as Thomas Hoccleve, John Capgrave, George Ashby, and the anonymous author of The Flower and the Leaf. The Scottish poet Robert Henryson consistently used the stanza throughout his two longest works, the Morall Fabillis and Testament of Cresseid. A few fifteenth-century Middle English romances use the form: Generides, Amoryus and Cleopes, and the Romans of Partenay. Rhyme royal was employed in drama in the later fifteenth-century Digby Conversion of Saint Paul.

=== Early-modern uses ===
In the early sixteenth century rhyme royal continued to appear in the works of poets such as John Skelton (e.g. in The Bowge of Court), Stephen Hawes (Pastime of Pleasure), Thomas Sackville (in the Induction to The Mirror for Magistrates), Alexander Barclay (The Ship of Fools), William Dunbar (The Thrissil and the Rois) and David Lyndsay (Squyer Meldrum). Sir Thomas Wyatt used it in his poem "They flee from me that sometime did me seek". The seven-line stanza began to be used less often during the Elizabethan era, but it was still deployed by John Davies in his Orchestra and by William Shakespeare in The Rape of Lucrece.

The later sixteenth-century poet Edmund Spenser wrote his Hymn of Heavenly Beauty using rhyme royal, but he also created his own Spenserian stanza, rhyming $\mathrm{ABABBCBCC}$, partly by adapting rhyme royal. The Spenserian stanza varies from iambic pentameter in its final line, which is a line of iambic hexameter, or in other words an English alexandrine. In the seventeenth century, John Milton experimented by extending the seventh line of the rhyme royal stanza itself into an alexandrine in "On the Death of a Fair Infant Dying of a Cough" and for the introductory stanzas of On the Morning of Christ's Nativity. Like many stanzaic forms, rhyme royal fell out of fashion during the later seventeenth-century Restoration, and it has never been widely used since.

=== Revivals ===
In the eighteenth century, Thomas Chatterton used Milton's modified rhyme royal stanza with a terminal alexandrine for some of his forged faux-Middle English poems, such as "Elinoure and Juga" and "An Excelente Balade of Charitie". The Romantic writers William Wordsworth and Samuel Taylor Coleridge, both figures who were influenced by Chatterton, adopted Milton's modified rhyme royal stanza in some works, such as Wordsworth's "Resolution and Independence" and Coleridge's "Psyche".

In the later nineteenth century William Morris, strongly influenced by Chaucer, wrote many parts of The Earthly Paradise with the related rhyme scheme ABABBCBCC. In the United States, Emma Lazarus wrote some short sections of her cycle poem "Epochs" in rhyme royal.

Notable twentieth-century poems in orthodox rhyme royal are W. H. Auden's Letter to Lord Byron (as well as some of the stanzas in The Shield of Achilles), W. B. Yeats's A Bronze Head and John Masefield's Dauber.

== English examples ==
=== Iambic pentameter ===
Each example below is from a different century. The first is from Chaucer who may have introduced the form into English. The second is from 15th-century Scotland where the Scottish Chaucerians widely cultivated it. The third is from Thomas Wyatt.

14th century — Chaucer

The double sorwe of Troilus to tellen,
That was the king Priamus sone of Troye,
In lovinge, how his aventures fellen
Fro wo to wele, and after out of Ioye,
My purpos is, er that I parte fro ye,
Thesiphone, thou help me for tendyte
Thise woful vers, that wepen as I wryt (Troilus and Criseyde 1.1–7)

15th century — Henryson

(Describing the god Saturn hailing from an extremely cold realm)

His face fronsit, his lyre was lyke the leid,
His teith chatterit and cheverit with the chin,
His ene drowpit, how sonkin in his heid,
Out of his nois the meldrop fast can rin,
With lippis bla and cheikis leine and thin;
The ice-schoklis that fra his hair doun hang
Was wonder greit and as ane speir als lang. (Testament of Cresseid 155–161)

16th century — Wyatt

They flee from me that sometime did me seek
With naked foot, stalking in my chamber.
I have seen them gentle, tame, and meek,
That now are wild and do not remember
That sometime they put themself in danger
To take bread at my hand; and now they range,
Busily seeking with a continual change. ("They Flee from Me" 1–7, modern spelling)

19th century — Emma Lazarus

It comes not in such wise as she had deemed,
Else might she still have clung to her despair.
More tender, grateful than she could have dreamed,
Fond hands passed pitying over brows and hair,
And gentle words borne softly through the air,
Calming her weary sense and wildered mind,
By welcome, dear communion with her kind. ("Sympathy" 1–7)

20th century – W. B. Yeats

Here at right of the entrance this bronze head,
Human, superhuman, a bird's round eye,
Everything else withered and mummy-dead.
What great tomb-haunter sweeps the distant sky
(Something may linger there though all else die)
And finds there nothing to make its terror less
Hysterica passio of its own emptiness? ("A Bronze Head" 1–7)

=== Other meters ===
Although in English verse the rhyme royal stanza is overwhelmingly composed in iambic pentameter, occasionally other lines are employed. Thomas Wyatt used iambic dimeter in his Revocation:

What should I say?
—Since Faith is dead,
And Truth away
From you is fled?
Should I be led
With doubleness?
Nay! nay! mistress. (1–7)

Percy Bysshe Shelley in his poem On an Icicle that Clung to the Grass of a Grave used anapestic tetrameter instead of iambic pentameter:

Oh! take the pure gem to where southerly breezes,
Waft repose to some bosom as faithful as fair,
In which the warm current of love never freezes,
As it rises unmingled with selfishness there,
Which, untainted by pride, unpolluted by care,
Might dissolve the dim icedrop, might bid it arise,
Too pure for these regions, to gleam in the skies. (1–7)

== Other languages ==
Outside English-speaking countries rhyme royal was never very popular. It was used in French poetry in the 15th century. Sometimes it occurred in Spanish and Portuguese poetry. Saint John of the Cross wrote the poem Coplas hechas sobre un éxtasis de harta contemplación. Portuguese playwright and poet Gil Vicente used rhyme royal scheme in his Villancete (in the English translation by Aubrey Fitz Gerald Aubertine, the rhyme scheme of the original text is altered):

Adorae montanhas
O Deos das alturas,
Tambem as verduras,

Adorae desertos
E serras floridas
O Deos dos secretos,
O Senhor das vidas;
Ribeiras crescidas
Louvae nas alturas
Deos das creaturas.

Louvae arvoredos
De fruto presado,
Digam os penedos:
Deos seja louvado,
E louve meu gado
Nestas verduras
Deos das alturas.

— Gil Vicente
Translation:

Worship, O mountains,
The God unseen.
And ye pastures green;

Ye deserts adore,
And ye flowered hills,
The Lord who earth fills
With life evermore.
Praise Him, rivers and rills,
God of earth and sky:
Praise Him on high.

With fruits' fair stock
Ye woods Him praise.
Ye mountain-ways
And every rock;
Praise Him, my flock.
In these pastures green.
The God unseen.

— Aubrey Fitz Gerald Aubertine

The villancete is similar in form to the Italian ballata mezzana (used by Guido Cavalcanti) or to the Spanish glosa. It consists of three stanzas: the first is a short envoi, followed by two seven-line stanzas.

Danish poet Adam Oehlenschläger used rhyme royal in one poem in his Nordens guder.

In Eastern Europe, rhyme royal is extremely rare. Polish poet Adam Asnyk used it in the poem Wśród przełomu (At the breakthrough). In Czech literature František Kvapil wrote the poem V hlubinách mraků (In Depths of Darkness) in rhyme royal.
