= Amoryus and Cleopes =

Amoryus and Cleopes is a poem written in 1449 by John Metham; it was an early English adaptation of the Pyramus and Thisbe narrative from Book 4 of Ovid‘s Metamorphoses.

== Author ==
John Metham was very probably one of the sons of Sir Thomas Metham, who had held the position of High Sheriff of Yorkshire in 1442 and 1459. Metham’s patrons, mentioned toward the end of the text, were Sir Miles Stapleton (died 1466), an important nobleman in Norfolk during the middle part of the fifteenth century, and his wife, Katherine de la Pole, daughter of Sir Thomas de la Pole, uncle of William, Duke of Suffolk, oldest son of Michael de la Pole, the Earl of Suffolk.

== Synopsis ==
The story of Amoryus and Cleopes begins after the Roman emperor Nero has conquered the realms of Persia and Media. Two Roman magistrates, Palamedon (Amoryus’s father) and Dydas (Cleopes’s father) are awarded control of the two realms. Before the background of prophecies and signs that foreshadow the downfall of the Roman gods in the realms, Amoryus and Cleopes meet and fall in love.

In true chivalric romance fashion, Amoryus proves his worthiness by defeating a discourteous knight and a dangerous dragon (the latter with Cleopes’s help). Because their parents are opposed to their relationship, the two lovers have to meet secretly outside the city walls. Cleopes arrives first at the appointed place, but a lion forces her to hide and drop her scarf. The lion wipes its bloody maw on the scarf, then walks away. Amoryus, who finds the scarf, believes Cleopes has been killed by the lion, and commits suicide. Cleopes then finds Amoryus dead and commits suicide in turn.

In a surprising Christian ending, the two lovers are resurrected by holy hermit. The hermit and the resurrected lovers return to the city, convince all citizens to convert to Christianity, and Amoryus and Cleopes are married according to Christian rite.

== Literary relations ==
For most of its plot, the poem is heavily indebted to Book 4 of the Metamorphoses of the Roman author Ovid (43 B.C.-A.D.18). However, Metham not only substitutes the names of Ovid's lovers (Pyramus and Thisbe), but Christianizes the entire story by adding a somewhat surprising salvific ending. For its style, language, and role of the narrator, Metham depends heavily on the fourteenth-century poet Geoffrey Chaucer, especially his poem Troilus and Criseyde.

== Manuscript and editions ==
Amoryus and Cleopes survives in a single manuscript, Princeton University Library, MS Garrett 141, fols. 17b-56b., which was first edited by Hardin Craig in 1916. In 1999, Stephen F. Page produced a student-friendly edition for the TEAMS series published by Western Michigan University’s Medieval Institute.
