= The Testament of Cresseid =

Poem written by Robert Henryson

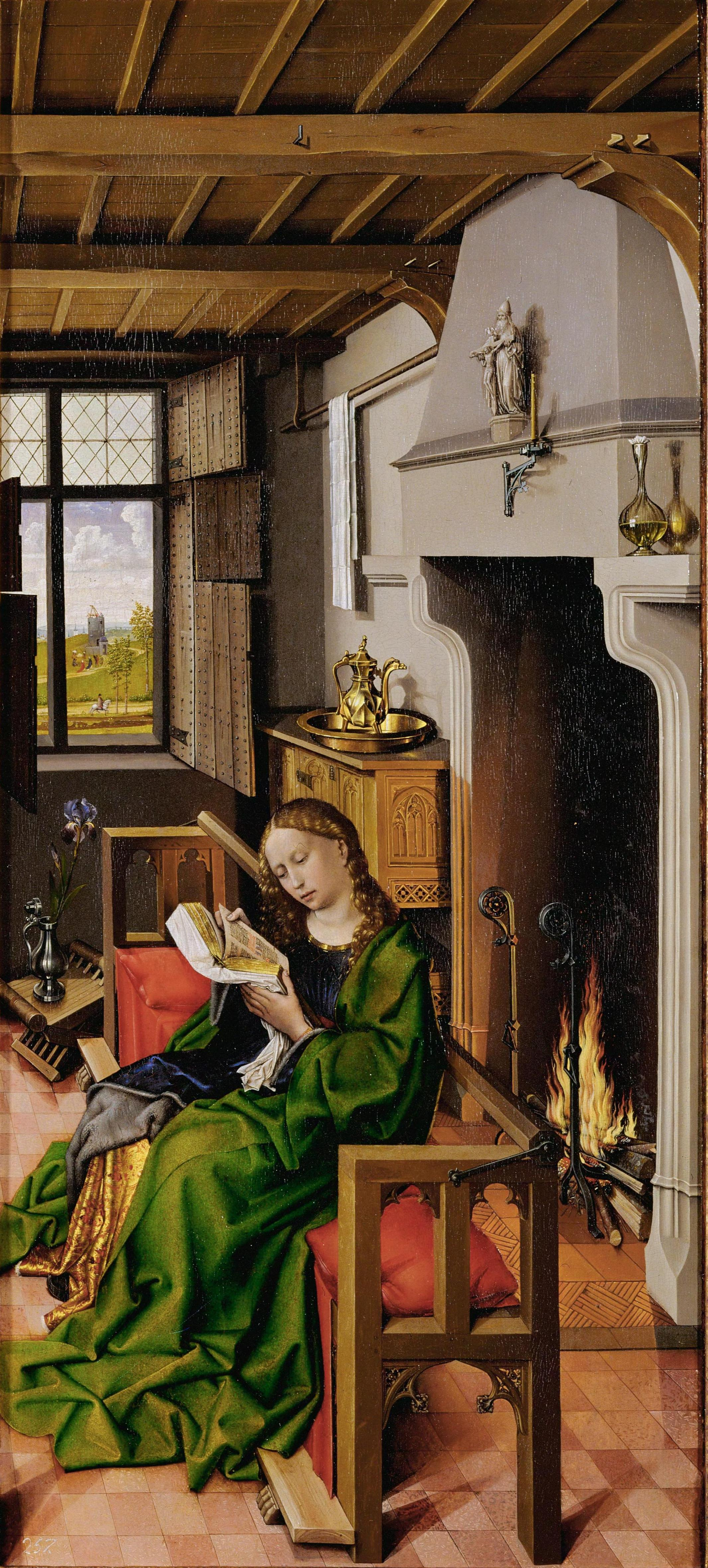
Henryson addressed his Testament to a readership of women. Painting by Robert Campin, 1438.

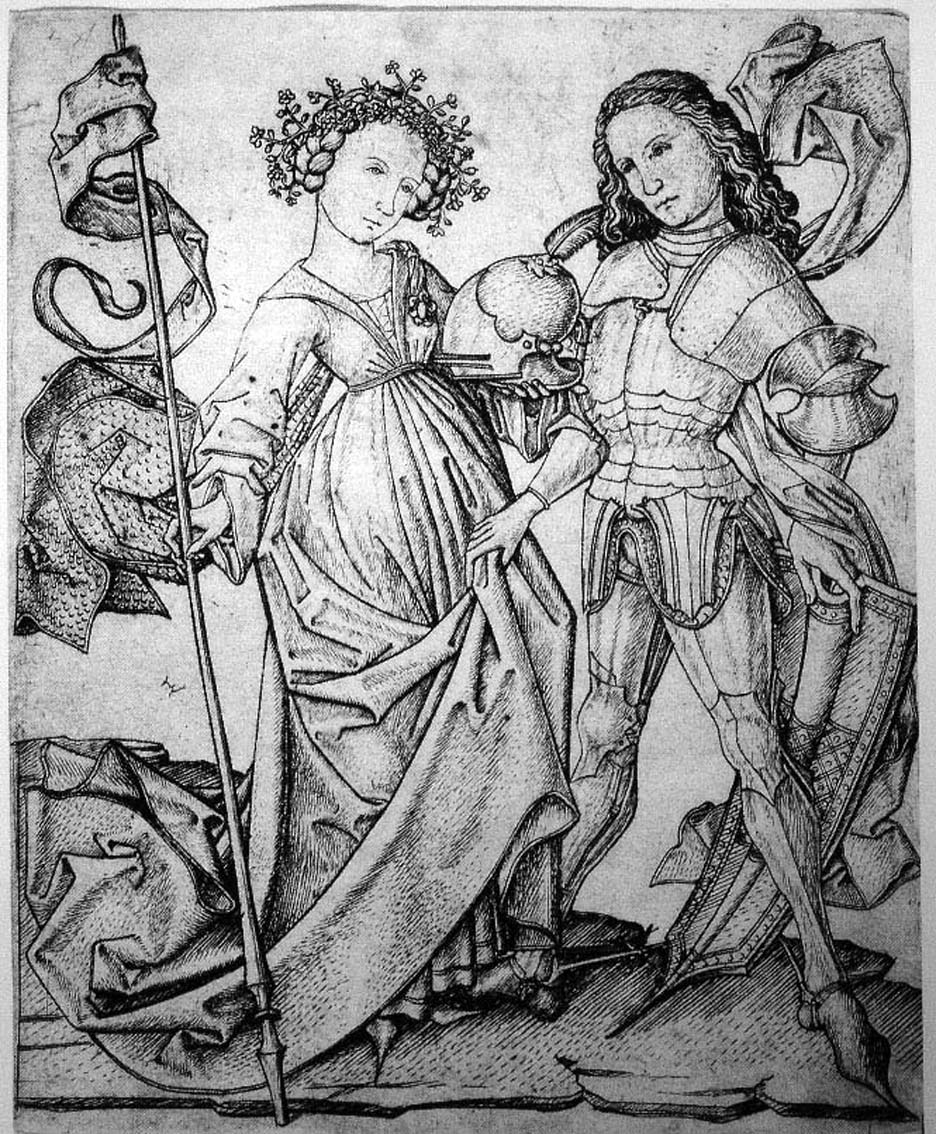
Diomede and Cressida, perhaps

The Testament of Cresseid is a narrative poem of 616 lines in Middle Scots, written by the 15th-century Scottish makar Robert Henryson. It is his best known poem. It imagines a tragic fate for Cressida in the medieval story of Troilus and Criseyde which was left untold in Geoffrey Chaucer's version. Henryson's cogent psychological drama, in which he consciously resists and confronts the routine depiction of Cressida (Cresseid) as simply 'false', is one of the features that has given the poem enduring interest for modern readers and it is one of the most admired works of Northern Renaissance literature. A modern English translation by Seamus Heaney, which also included seven of Henryson's fables from The Morall Fabillis, was published in 2009.

== Narrative outline ==
Diomedes, an Achaean hero with whom Cresseid begins a romantic relationship after being separated from and subsequently losing romantic interest in Troilus, banishes Cresseid from his company, thereby leaving her destitute. After wandering for a while amongst the Greek soldiers, seeking their company, she returns to the home of her father Calchas, a keeper of the temple of Venus. Though Calchas welcomes her heartily, Cresseid desires to hide away from a disapproving world and encloses herself in a private oratory, where she weeps and rages against the cruelty of Venus and Cupid in, as she sees it, leading her on. The gods take offence at this blasphemy, and assemble to pass judgement on her, and the poem features graphically-realised portraits of the planetary pantheon of gods in the dream vision at its heart. They strike her with the symptoms of leprosy which remove her youth and good looks, leaving her disfigured and blind. She is thus considered a social outcast and decides she must join a leper colony. There she laments her fate until a fellow leper woman encourages her not to sigh over things which cannot be changed, but instead to take her cup and clapper and join the other lepers to beg for daily alms.

As Cresseid joins the lepers to go out begging, Troilus and the garrison of Troy happen to pass by. She lifts her eyes to his, but since she is blind she cannot recognise him. Troilus, similarly unable to recognise the disfigured Cresseid, yet being reminded of her, without quite knowing why, is spontaneously moved to give up to her all the wealth he has about him at that moment (his belt, a full purse of gold, and jewels) before riding off, almost fainting for grief when he reaches Troy. The lepers are astounded at the unexpected show of beneficence and when Cresseid asks of her benefactor's identity and is told, she, like Troilus, too is overcome with emotion. She berates herself for her treatment of him and renounces her previously 'selfish' complaints, before sitting down to write her testament, or will, dying soon after.

Henryson's portrayal of Cresseid's 'disgrace' and ultimately tragic end, through the narrator of the poem, is observed with a largely rigorous objectivity. Where the narrator comes to judge, rather than reinforcing the institutional admonishment of a 'shocked' or disapproving society, he 'confesses' to his natural pity for Cresseid's misfortune, against the standard view of 'false womanhood' which she was taken in his day to represent. This is perhaps all the more expressive for having been apparently withheld or 'repressed' within the conceit of the poem. The most explicit statement of this breaks through in the passage:

Yit nevertheless, quhat ever men deme or say
In scornefull langage of thy brukkilnes,
I sall excuse als far furth as I may
Thy womanheid, thy wisdome and fairnes,
The quhilk fortoun hes put to sic distres
As hir pleisit, and nathing throw the gilt
Of the, throw wickit langage to be spilt!

== Characters ==
- Cresseid, daughter of Calchas, who is punished for breaking her vow of love to Troilus
- Troilus, one of the sons of Trojan king Priam, and former lover of Cresseid
- Calchas, Cresseid's loving father. In the Testament, he is a priest of Venus and Cupid.
- The gods Cupid, Saturn, Jupiter, Mars, Phoebus, Venus, Mercury, and Cynthia.

== Structure ==
- Throughout the poem, Henryson makes use of the rhyme royal, a rhyme scheme introduced and popularised by Geoffrey Chaucer, and set out as follows- ABABBCC. The stanzas are generally seven lines each in length, and in iambic pentameter. However, in the section in which Cresseid laments her fate from the leper colony (a Complaint), the stanzas are nine lines in length, and with the rhyme scheme AABAABBAB

== Adaptation ==
In either the 16th or early 17th century, Henryson's poem, along with its predecessor, was adapted into the anonymous Welsh closet drama Troelus a Chresyd.
