= Jonathan Fruoco =

French historian

Jonathan Fruoco FRHistS
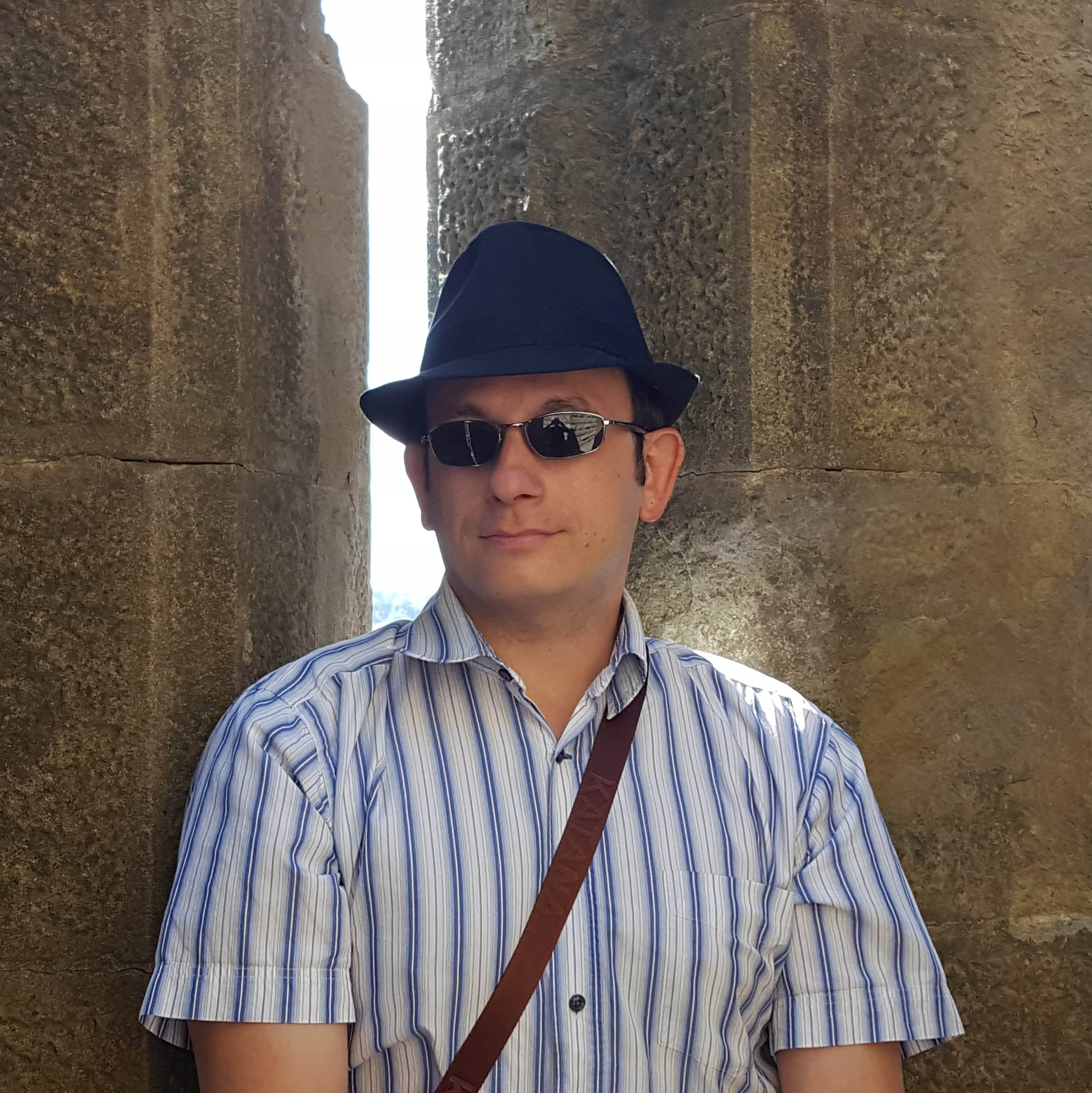
- Born: Grenoble, France
- Education: Grenoble Alpes University, Paris Nanterre University
- Known for: Serial imaginary, Chaucer's dialogism, medieval translations
- Scientific career
- Fields: Medieval literature, historical sociolinguistics, anthropology, translation studies
- Workplaces: Paris Nanterre University - CREA
- Website: www.jonathanfruoco.com

Jonathan Fruoco, FRHistS (born 1987) is a French historian who specializes in medieval English literature, with a specific focus on the polyphony of Geoffrey Chaucer's poetry, and historical sociolinguistics. In 2022, he was elected a Fellow of the Royal Historical Society.

He is notably the first translator and editor of the medieval Robin Hood poems in French and has directed a research project leading to the development of the notion of serial imaginary.

== Biography ==
Dr. Fruoco was trained as a sociolinguist at Université Grenoble Alpes and then focused his interest on the cultural and linguistic evolution of medieval England. He greatly contributed to the studies on Chaucerian polyphony, having published three books on the subject (Geoffrey Chaucer: polyphonie et modernité in 2015 and Chaucer's Polyphony: The Modern in Medieval Poetry in 2020, and Polyphony and the Modern in 2021), and dozens of articles.

He posits that Chaucer, who has long been considered as the father of English poetry, should rather be thought of as the father of English prose and one of the main creators of the polyphonic novel, in the Bakhtinian sense of the word.

Besides his work as a medievalist, Dr. Fruoco has edited and translated for the very first time in French a selection of medieval poems and plays about Robin Hood published in the award-winning Les faits et gestes de Robin des Bois (UGA Editions, 2017). These texts, which had long been unknown to French academics and general readers, track the birth and evolution of this legendary character from the Middle Ages to the end of the Renaissance.

As Associate researcher at Université Grenoble Alpes, he organized a series of conferences that put forward the concept of imaginary and tried to understand how it functions when faced with serial works of art. This research led to the coinage of serial imaginary and was illustrated in Imaginaire sériel: Les mécanismes sériels à l'oeuvre dans l'acte créatif, (Jonathan Fruoco and Andréa Rando Martin (Ed.), Grenoble, UGA Edition, 2017).

== Recent Publications ==
- Blanc, William, Breton, Justine and Fruoco, Jonathan. Robin des Bois. De Sherwood à Hollywood. Montreuil: Libertalia, 2024.
- Fruoco, Jonathan (ed.). Unveiling the Green Knight. Nanterre: Presses universitaires de Paris Nanterre, 2024.
- Fruoco, Jonathan. Geoffrey Chaucer. Troïlus et Criseyde: oeuvres complètes (Tome II). Paris: Classiques Garnier, 2023.
- Fruoco, Jonathan. Geoffrey Chaucer. Le Livre de la Duchesse: oeuvres complètes (Tome I). Paris: Classiques Garnier, 2021.
- Fruoco, Jonathan. Polyphony and the Modern. London: Routledge, 2021.
- Fruoco, Jonathan. Chaucer's Polyphony: The Modern in Medieval Poetry. Kalamazoo, Berling: MIP, De Gruyter, 2020.
- Fruoco, Jonathan. "Geoffrey Chaucer et le dédale de Renommée". Questes 42. Paris: Presses Universitaires de la Sorbonne, 2020.
- Fruoco, Jonathan. "Si l’or doit rouiller, que deviendra le fer ? Chaucer et les représentations du Pardonneur dans les Contes de Canterbury". Mélanges de Science Religieuses 76/4. Lille: FLSH de l’Université Catholique de Lille, 2019, p. 5-18.
- Fruoco, Jonathan. "Emergence des vernaculaires et traductions du sacré dans l’Europe médiévale : le cas de conscience de l’Église". ‘Translatio’ and the History of Ideas: Ideas, language, politics. Volume 1 Edited by Anna Kukułka-Wojtasik. Berne: Peter Lang. 2019, p. 169-176.
- Fruoco, Jonathan. "Geoffrey Chaucer, The Merchant’s Tale et la dialectique de l’élévation". IRIS, Ed. Fleur Vigneron, Université Grenoble Alpes, n°39, 2019. On line, 03 Septembre 2019.
- Fruoco, Jonathan. Les faits et gestes de Robin des Bois : poèmes, ballades et saynètes. Grenoble: UGA Éditions, 2017.
- Fruoco, Jonathan, Laimé, Arnaud, Rando Martin, Andréa (Ed.). Imaginaire sériel: Les mécanismes sériels à l'oeuvre dans l'acte créatif. Grenoble: UGA Éditions, 2017.
