= Miles Stapleton (died 1466) =

Member of the Parliament of England

Arms of Stapleton: Argent, a lion rampant sable

Sir Miles Stapleton (c. 1408 – 1 October 1466) was Lord of the manor of Ingham, Norfolk and de jure Baron Ingham of Ingham, Norfolk, and Lord of the manor of Bedale, Yorkshire.

== Family ==
Sir Miles Stapleton was the son of Sir Brian Stapleton, of Ingham (1379–1438), Sheriff of Norfolk, a veteran of the Battle of Agincourt, and Cecily Bardolf (d. 1432), daughter to William Bardolf, 4th Baron Bardolf, of Wormegay, Norfolk, and Agnes de Poynings. He did homage for his paternal inheritance on 2 February 1440.

Sir Miles Stapleton married firstly Elizabeth Felbrigge, daughter of Sir Simon Felbrigge, Knight of the Garter, of Felbrigg, Norfolk by Margaret, perhaps of Teschen, a kinswoman and lady in waiting to English queen Anne of Bohemia. They had no issue. He married secondly in 1438, Katherine de la Pole (1416–1488; buried in Rowley Abbey, Oxfordshire), daughter and heiress to Sir Thomas de la Pole (aft. 1397–1433), who died in France while a hostage for his brother William, son to Michael de la Pole, 2nd Earl of Suffolk. They had two known daughters, the eldest, Elizabeth Stapleton, married before March 1464, Sir William Calthorpe of Burnham Thorpe, Norfolk. The younger daughter, Jane (or Joan) Stapleton (d. 1519), married Sir Christopher Harcourt of Great Ashby, (Ashby Magna), Leicestershire (d. 1474) and remarried John Hudleston (Huddleston), of Millom Castle, appointed sheriff of Cumberland by the Duke of Gloucester and keeper and bailiff of the king's woods and chases in Barnoldswick, Yorkshire, steward of Penrith and warden of the west marches.

== Activities ==
He was a Knight of the Shire for Suffolk, and for Norfolk also, and was High Sheriff of Norfolk and Suffolk in 1440. In 1441–2 Sir Miles Stapleton and Thomas Tudenham were summoned as Knights and M.P.'s for Norfolk to attend the Privy Council. In 1442 he also had a Royal Commission for the Safekeeping of the seas.

Stapleton was in the French wars, where he single-handedly took seven prisoners, for whom he was given a safe-conduct dated 22 June 1436/7 to take them into Flanders "pro finantiis suis" probably to get money for their ransoms. The following year he and his brother, Bryan Stapleton of Crispings, in Happisburgh, & Hasilden, Norfolk, received the thanks of the Privy Council in connection with a riot at Norwich.

Stapleton is mentioned in the 1449 poem Amoryus and Cleopes, as the patron of its author John Metham.

== Arms and burial ==
His arms are recorded as Argent, a lion rampant sable.

Stapleton was buried in Ingham Priory, Norfolk, where there was once a monumental brass (now lost).
