= Troilus and Criseyde =

1380s poem by Geoffrey Chaucer

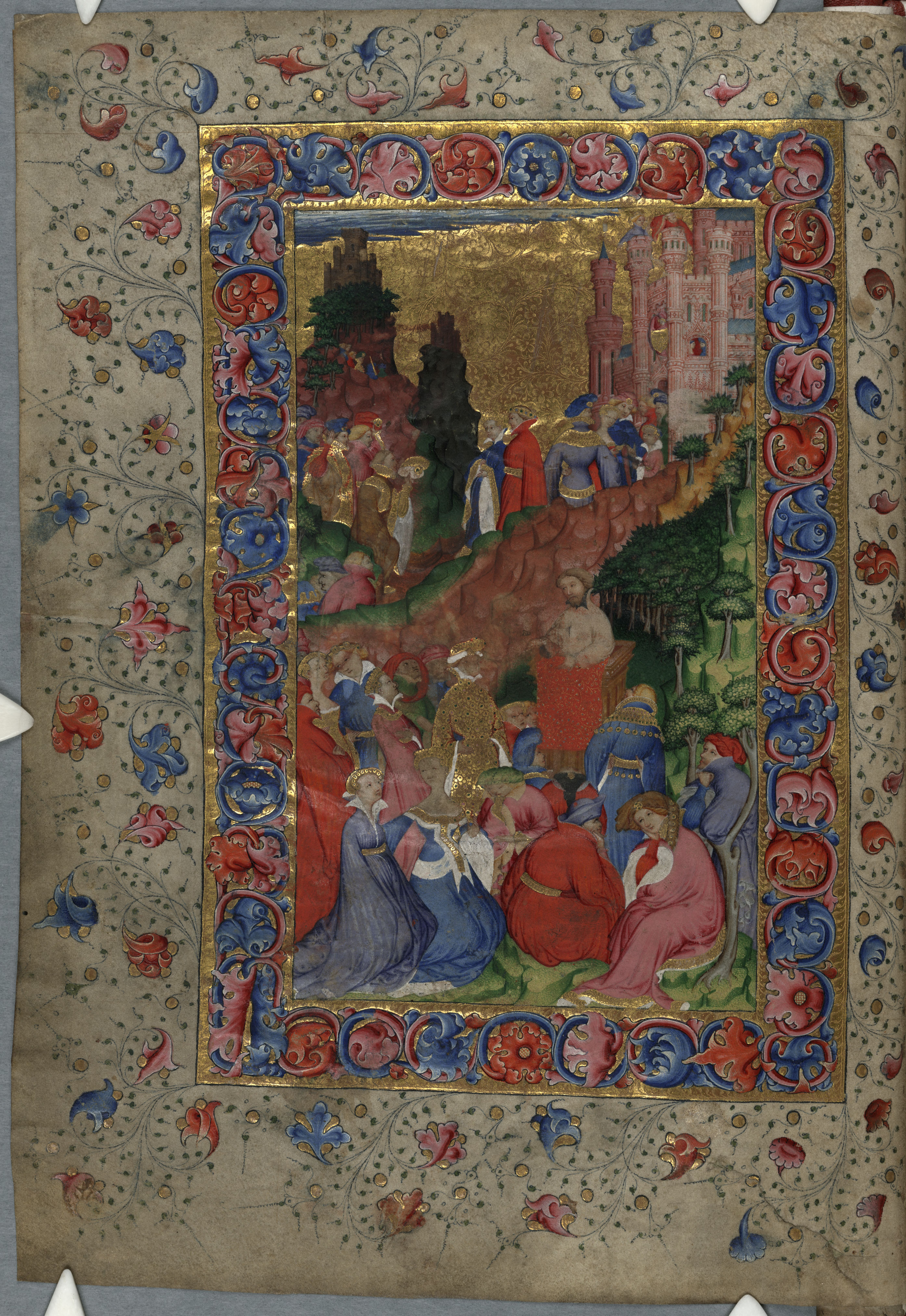
Geoffrey Chaucer reciting before nobles

Troilus and Criseyde (/ˈtrɔɪləs ... krɪˈseɪdə/) is an epic poem by Geoffrey Chaucer which re-tells in Middle English the tragic story of the lovers Troilus and Criseyde set against a backdrop of war during the siege of Troy. It was written in rime royale and probably completed during the mid-1380s. Many Chaucer scholars regard it as the poet's finest work. As a finished long poem, it is more self-contained than the better known but ultimately unfinished The Canterbury Tales. This poem is often considered the source of the phrase: "all good things must come to an end" (3.615).

Although Troilus is a character from Ancient Greek literature, the expanded story of him as a lover was of Medieval origin. The first known version is from Benoît de Sainte-Maure's poem Roman de Troie, but Chaucer's principal source appears to have been Boccaccio, who re-wrote the tale in his Il Filostrato. Chaucer attributes the story to a "Lollius" (whom he also mentions in The House of Fame), although no writer with this name is known. Chaucer's version can be said to reflect a less cynical and less misogynistic world-view than Boccaccio's, casting Criseyde as fearful and sincere rather than simply fickle and having been led astray by the eloquent and perfidious Pandarus. It also inflects the sorrow of the story with humour.

The poem had an important legacy for later writers. Robert Henryson's Scots poem The Testament of Cresseid imagined a rambunctious fate for Criseyde not given by Chaucer. In historical editions of the English Troilus and Criseyde, Henryson's distinct and separate work was sometimes included without accreditation as an "epilogue" to Chaucer's tale. Other texts, for example, John Metham's Amoryus and Cleopes (c. 1449), adapt language and authorship strategies from the famous predecessor poem. Shakespeare's tragedy Troilus and Cressida, although much darker in tone, was also based in part on the material.

Troilus and Criseyde is usually considered to be a courtly romance, although the generic classification is an area of significant debate in most Middle English literature. It is part of the Matter of Rome cycle, a fact which Chaucer emphasizes.

== Characters ==
- Troilus, Trojan Prince, a warrior, the son of King Priam and wooer of Criseyde
- Criseyde, Calchas' daughter
- Achilles, a Greek warrior
- Antenor, a soldier held captive by the Greeks, traded for Criseyde's safety, eventually betrays Troy
- Calchas, a Trojan prophet who joins the Greeks
- Diomede, woos Criseyde in the Greek Camp
- Helen, wife to Menelaus, lover of Paris
- Pandarus, Criseyde's uncle, who advises Troilus in the wooing of Criseyde
- Priam, King of Troy
- Cassandra, Daughter of Priam, a prophetess at the temple of Apollo
- Hector, Prince of Troy, fierce warrior and leader of the Trojan armies
- Paris, Prince of Troy, lover of Helen
- Deiphobus, Prince of Troy, aids Troilus in the wooing of Criseyde

== Synopsis ==
Calchas, a soothsayer, foresees the fall of Troy and abandons the city in favour of the Greeks; his daughter, Criseyde, receives some ill will on account of her father's betrayal. Troilus, a warrior of Troy, publicly mocks love and is punished by the God of Love by being struck with irreconcilable desire for Criseyde, whom he sees passing through the temple. With the help of sly Pandarus, Criseyde's uncle, Troilus and Criseyde begin to exchange letters. Eventually, Pandarus develops a plan to urge the two into bed together; Troilus swoons when he thinks the plan is going amiss, but Pandarus and Criseyde revive him. Pandarus leaves, and Troilus and Criseyde spend a night of bliss together.

Calchas eventually persuades the Greeks to exchange a prisoner of war, Antenor, for his daughter Criseyde. Hector, of Troy, objects; as does Troilus, although he does not voice his concern. Troilus speaks to Criseyde and suggests they elope but she offers a logical argument as to why it would not be practical. Criseyde promises to deceive her father and return to Troy after ten days; Troilus leaves her with a sense of foreboding. Upon arriving in the Greek camp, Criseyde realizes the unlikeliness of her being able to keep her promise to Troilus. She writes dismissively in response to his letters and on the tenth day accepts a meeting with Diomede, and listens to him speak of love. Later, she accepts him as a lover. Pandarus and Troilus wait for Criseyde: Pandarus sees that she will not return and eventually Troilus realizes this as well. Troilus curses Fortune, even more so because he still loves Criseyde; Pandarus offers some condolences. The narrator, with an apology for giving women a bad name, bids farewell to his book, and briefly recounts Troilus's death in battle and his ascent to the eighth sphere, draws a moral about the transience of earthly joys and the inadequacy of paganism, dedicates his poem to John Gower and Strode, asks the protection of the Trinity, and prays that we be worthy of Christ's mercy.

== Form ==
The poem is written in rhyme royal, which consists of seven-line stanzas in ABABBCC rhyme format. Most lines have either 10 or 11 syllables. The poem is split into 5 books, with the first being considerably shorter than the others at only 1092 lines. In total, Troilus and Criseyde consists of 8,244 lines, or more than 1000 stanzas.

== Inspiration ==
Chaucer's primary source was Boccaccio's Il Filostrato, a poem he never mentions within Troilus and Criseyde but which is its clear inspiration. The text of Troilus and Criseyde is roughly 40% longer than Il Filostrato, and Chaucer primarily expands upon Boccaccio in writing about the inner lives of his characters in more detail.

The Canticus Troili is a translation of Petrarch's Sonnet 132 from Il Canzoniere.

Troilus' philosophical monologue in Book IV is from Boethius' Consolation of Philosophy, a book that was extremely influential to Chaucer.

== Adaptations ==
In either the 16th or early 17th century, Chaucer's poem and its sequel – Robert Henryson's The Testament of Cresseid – were adapted into the anonymous Welsh closet play Troelus a Chresyd.
