= They Flee from Me =

Poem by Thomas Wyatt

"They flee from me" is a poem written by Thomas Wyatt. It is written in rhyme royal and was included in Arthur Quiller-Couch's edition of the Oxford Book of English Verse. The poem has been described as possibly autobiographical, and referring to any one of Wyatt's affairs with high-born women of the court of Henry VIII, perhaps with Anne Boleyn.

The poem is transmitted in several differing versions: in the Egerton manuscript, in the Devonshire manuscript beneath the line "Vixi Puellis Nuper Idoneus" (from Horace's Ode III 26), and in print in Tottel's Miscellany (1557) under the title "The louer sheweth how he is forsaken of such as he somtime enioyed".

They flee from me, that sometime did me seek
With naked foot stalking in my chamber.
I have seen them gentle, tame, and meek
That now are wild and do not remember
That sometime they put themself in danger
To take bread at my hand; and now they range,
Busily seeking with a continual change.

Thanked be fortune it hath been otherwise
Twenty times better; but once in special,
In thin array, after a pleasant guise,
When her loose gown from her shoulders did fall,
And she me caught in her arms long and small,
Therewithal sweetly did me kiss
And softly said, "Dear heart, how like you this?"

It was no dream, I lay broad waking.
But all is turned, thorough my gentleness,
Into a strange fashion of forsaking;
And I have leave to go, of her goodness,
And she also to use newfangleness.
But since that I so kindely am served,
I fain would know what she hath deserved.

== Literary interpretation ==
The poem has several interpretations and works because of indirection. Scholars question whether the poet is writing about a particular woman, women in general or women at all. The poet was close to Anne Boleyn, second wife of Henry VIII and mother of Queen Elizabeth, and so Wyatt could be hanged for treason if he revealed that she was his lover. She would also be beheaded for treason. So his poem could not name the lady. Nicola Shulman opines Wyatt could only protest his station in life and in the court of Henry VIII in love poems. Thus his poem might be more of a complaint to Henry VIII than a love poem (269). The words of Wyatt's poem can be read in two or more ways, as literal and symbolic with puns and riddles running through them. He was a master at the use of words. The first line is an antimetabole a type of chiasmus in which a sentence of ABBA structure, is exactly reversed: "They flee from me, that sometime did me seek," thus hinting at Wyatt's clever use of both words and structure (Grausso 61). He is both ironic and paradoxical, using Petrarchan contraries to not only compress meaning, but also to force the reader to supply "half the information"(103-5). His poem might be seen as a code for those in Henry's court, who would know all names and intrigues in the court(Murphy 24) In Wyatt's poem the speaker does not move. Those around him move while he reclines(81-3) thus communicating his need to protest Henry without reaping a death sentence. He is the first to deduce that Petrarch's deer was "a courtly lady pursued by suitors" (110). Hence critics posit that "tame and meek...wild" and "take bread at my hand" in the first stanza refers to an animal most likely a deer, so is probably referring to "a courtly lady pursued by suitors." The second stanza of the poem recalls a time with a particular lady in which the lady asserts love before the speaker reciprocates. "Dear heart" might be a homonymic reference to the deer in the first stanza(Buckley).

In most such poetry, the speaker would claim he was asleep, dreaming. In the third stanza of this poem the speaker claims "I lay broad waking," thus asserting that what is written about in the second stanza actually occurred.

F. W. Bateson, in "Sir Thomas Wyatt and the Renaissance" in English Poetry A Critical Introduction opines that the poem epitomizes the Renaissance. The Medieval world included a strong connection between the physical and spiritual world. The Renaissance world was unpredictable. But the Renaissance man believed in his luck not because he was lucky. It was more a belief in himself (23). S.F. Johnson discusses the difference between the first two stanzas, claiming the first is about birds whereas the second stanza includes a mistress, but the mistress is really fortune (28). George W. Whiting in "Fortune in Wyatt's 'They Flee From Me'" posits a similar sentiment, claiming that the poem's topic is fortune. Each stanza includes a different stage of the relationship between the speaker and fortune. In the first stanza, fortune has deserted the speaker, in stanza two it was faithful at one time, and in stanza three it is inconsistent. The poem only has the guise of a love poem, but instead is about the more universal theme, fortune (39). Smaller questions are posed by the words Wyatt uses such as "stalking," which has transformed in meaning over time from simple soft walking in Tudor times (23) to its meaning today, of following someone with the intention of doing them harm. According to Murphy, G.F. Nott, writing in the early 19th century contends that "kiss" did not mean "kiss" as we think of it. It was a ritual from Chivalry. Nott explored old Chivalric texts to find his definition. He inferred from his understanding of the word kiss, that the poem was not about a man and a woman, but about something more general and or political such as the poet's relationship to the court of Henry VIII (137). Another word causing confusion is "new-fangledness," which might mean that the woman has a new lover, or many lovers or can mean something completely different such as a new awareness or new way of doing things (192) or can mean faithless as in not believing in the Catholic religion(Shulman). And while most claim that the creatures that took bread were either deer or some sort of bird, because they are taking bread from a hand and people feed birds bread or breadcrumbs, (19) one critic claims the creature is a falcon, which other interpreters claim is absurd. But falconry was popular in that era and used in literature. Shakespeare used it in "Taming of the Shrew" as an analogy to taming Kate in the play (Shakespeare 4.1.169-176). And the relationship between a falcon and its owner is complex as the bird must be broken of its wildness, tamed and kept in captivity, including blindness between hunting expeditions.
