= Cressida =

Character in Troilus and Cressida

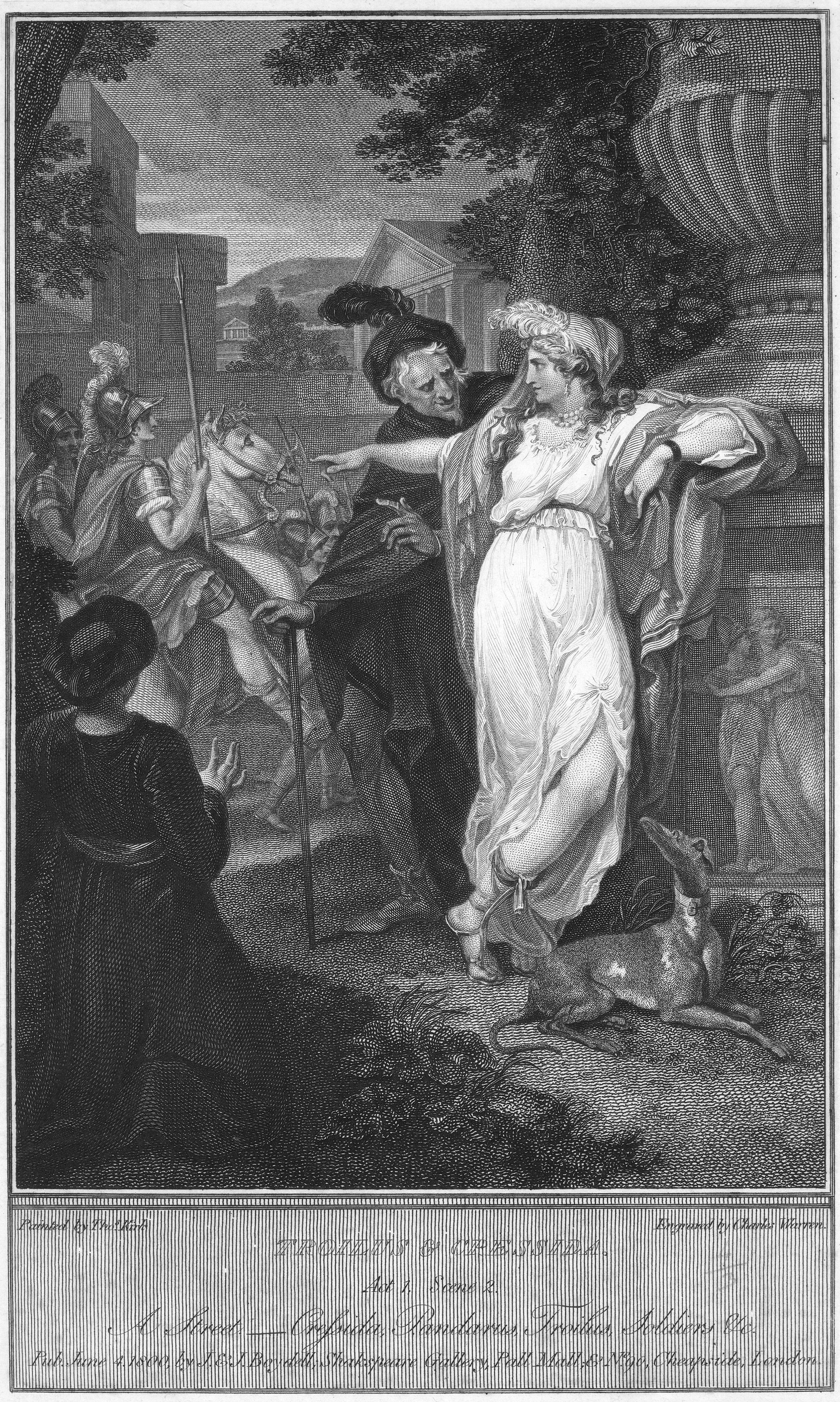
Cressida depicted by Thomas Kirk

Cressida (/ˈkrɛsɪdə/), also rendered Criseida, Cresseid or Criseyde, is a character who appears in many medieval and Renaissance-era retellings of the Trojan War, most notably Geoffrey Chaucer's Troilus and Criseyde and William Shakespeare's Troilus and Cressida. While her character in the later western tradition was developed from Chryseis, a minor figure in Homer's Iliad, they share few similarities.

Cressida is a Trojan and the daughter of Calchas, a seer who defects and allies herself with the Greeks. During the Trojan War, she falls in love with Prince Troilus, the youngest son of Priam, king of Troy. The pair pledge everlasting love, but when Cressida is sent to the Greeks as part of a hostage exchange, she begins an affair with the Greek warrior Diomedes. Cressida has often been portrayed and interpreted as a femme fatale who leads Troilus to ruin.

== Character history ==
The character's name is derived from that of Chryseis, a character who appears in the Iliad but has no connection with Troilus, Diomedes or Calchas. Indeed, the story of Troilus and Cressida does not appear in any Greek legends but was invented by the twelfth century French poet Benoît de Sainte-Maure in the Roman de Troie. The woman in the love triangle is here called not Cressida but Briseida, a name derived from that of Briseis, a different character in the Iliad, who again is neither related to Calchas nor involved in any love affairs with Troilus or Diomedes. Initially, after the Roman appeared, other authors who refer to the story, for example, Azalais d'Altier in her poem Tanz salutz e tantas amors and Guido delle Colonne in his Historia destructionis Troiae, continue to use names derived from that of Briseis.

It is the Italian author and poet Boccaccio who makes the decisive shift in the character's name in Il Filostrato. This poem from the 1330s is the first work dedicated to telling the story of the love triangle rather than to the larger tale of the Trojan War. Geoffrey Chaucer's Troilus and Criseyde is an expanded version of the story based on Boccaccio. Several other authors then took up the tale, including the Scottish poet Robert Henryson in his The Testament of Cresseid, which 'completes' Cressida's story (left unfinished by Chaucer), and William Shakespeare in his play of the Trojan War, Troilus and Cressida.

Cressida has most often been depicted by writers as "false Cressida", a paragon of female inconstancy. As soon as she has betrayed Troilus, she has fulfilled her purpose and the men who have written about her do not mention her again. Such is the case in Benoît, Guido, Boccaccio, Chaucer and Shakespeare. Chaucer's poem, however, at least portrays a more sympathetic Criseyde showing a self-conscious awareness of her literary status: "Alas, of me until the world's end shall be wrote no good song". Henryson's treatment is unusual in that he looks at events after the end of the traditional tale. His poem takes up the repentant Cresseid's story after she has been abandoned by Diomedes and developed leprosy.

Some authors have attempted to exonerate the character by having her choose Troilus over Diomedes. Such is the case in John Dryden's rewriting of Shakespeare in an attempt at "remov[ing] that heap of Rubbish, under which many excellent thoughts lay bury'd". William Walton and Christopher Hassall's 1954 opera Troilus and Cressida did likewise. In both of these cases, Cressida's being true to Troilus is associated with her death as part of the concluding tragic events.

Other modern fiction has introduced further departures from the traditional narrative. Jack Lindsay's novel Cressida's First Lover: A Tale of Ancient Greece explores another area untouched in standard narratives, some of her earlier life.

== Shakespeare ==
Print, from a painting by E. J. Poynter, in The Graphic Gallery of Shakespeare's Heroines (1896)

In William Shakespeare's Troilus and Cressida, Cressida is first introduced in Act 1, Scene 1. Pandarus and Troilus are discussing how the latter's unspoken love for the former's niece, Cressida, is preventing him from performing on the battlefield. She first appears in person in the following scene, where she has a conversation with Pandarus. While the pair is speaking, Troilus walks past, and her uncle attempts to convince Cressida to take him as a lover. However, Cressida teases him, saying she has heard that the Greek warrior Achilles is far more impressive. Once Pandarus exits, Cressida admits in a soliloquy that she does in fact love Troilus, but is too worried to admit her feelings:

Yet I hold off. Women are angels, wooing:
Things won are done, joy's soul lies in the doing.
That she beloved knows nought that knows not this:
Men prize the thing ungained more than it is:
That she was never yet that ever knew
Love got so sweet as when desire did sue.
Therefore this maxim out of love I teach:
"Achievement is command; ungained, beseech."
That though my heart's contents firm love doth bear,
Nothing of that shall from mine eyes appear.

— Troilus and Cressida, Act 1 Scene 2, lines 225–234

She next appears in Act 3, Scene 2, when Pandarus leads her on stage wearing a veil to meet with Troilus. Pandarus then heads back "inside" and the two are left alone. There, Troilus confesses his love for her, and she admits that she feels the same way for him. In a confused speech she battles with her own fate as a woman, even speaking in a collective woman's voice, revealing a greater intelligence than the male characters give her credit for:

I love you now; but till now not so much
But I might master it; in faith, I lie:
My thoughts were like unbridled children grown
Too headstrong for their mother. See, we fools!
Why have I blabbed? Who shall be true to us,
When we are so unsecret to ourselves?
But, though I loved you well, I wooed you not,
And yet, good faith, I wished myself a man,
Or that we women had men's privilege
Of speaking first.

— Troilus and Cressida, Act 3 Scene 2, lines 92–101

Cressida becomes increasingly affected by her own qualities, saying 'I show more craft than love' (line 124). She begs to be allowed to leave, but Troilus and Pandarus want her to stay, so that they can marry to immediate effect. She seems to prophesise her own failings, repeating the word 'false' seven times before Pandarus 'seals' the match. In Act 4 Scene 2 we see the couple on the morning after their first night together. They are euphoric, but Cressida does not want Troilus to leave her, showing an awareness of her own vulnerability in that moment. On line 20, she says 'you men will never tarry' as he begins to contemplate leaving. Pandarus enters and cracks some jokes about how she had now lost her innocence, and Cressida is flustered. Once Troilus and Cressida are dressed, Aeneas visits in a panic to say that for the return of one of Troy's men from the Greeks, Antenor, they must trade Cressida over to Diomedes, a Greek general. Cressida becomes an object to trade, and Troilus does nothing to prevent the sad event, though he is miserable for it. In Act 4 Scene 4 Cressida is informed of the plans to trade her to the Greeks. Troilus gives her his sleeve as a love token and she gives him a glove. Their relationship becomes an inversion of Paris and Helen's. Diomedes enters and Cressida is handed over.

In the following scene we again see Cressida in a less vulnerable state. Although she is now being led through the Greek encampment by Diomedes, surrounded by men, she engages with the men, Ulysses in particular, with defensive banter. Ulysses predicts her behaviour using coarse phrases such as "sluttish spoils". Act 5 Scene 2 is the most poignant scene containing Cressida, and the most memorable. Troilus has crept into the camp and is accompanied by Ulysses, and they watch the scene unfolding between Diomedes and Cressida unnoticed. Thersites is also present and unseen, the clown of dark humour making distasteful comments exaggerating the sexual implications of what he sees. Cressida flirts with Diomedes, yet is occasionally struck by guilt. She appears to lust after him, even giving him Troilus's sleeve as a love token, though quickly tries to retrieve it from him in a struggle, offering her own body in trade. Diomedes insists he will have both. He exits, having planned a return visit. Troilus is mad with jealousy and anger throughout the scene, but Cressida never realises he is close by. Her final lines of the play are:

Troilus, farewell! One eye yet looks on thee,
But with my heart the other eye doth see.
Ah, poor our sex! This fault in us I find,
The error of our eye doth direct our mind:
What error leads must err. O, then conclude
Minds swayed by eyes are full of turpitude.

— Troilus and Cressida, Act 5 Scene 2, lines 122–127

Later, we are told of things that concern her: for example, the letter Troilus receives which he tears up, and Troilus' horse which Diomedes sends to her as a prize after knocking him out of the saddle in battle.

In All's well that ends well act 2 scene 1 line 97 Lafew says: "I am Cressida's uncle that dare leave two together," i.e. the king and Helena who has come to cure him. Cressida's uncle serves as a go-between for Cressida and Troilus.

=== Contemporary criticism ===
Troilus and Cressida has little performance history prior to the 20th century. Cressida's character is as isolated from framing as the rest of the story—we never know how her life ends, there is no "ever after" for her, and even her beginning is mysterious to us. She appears a witty young girl, only to become a serious, thoughtful, and thought-provoking woman in moments of reflection. Carol Rutter explores the reasons why Cressida is so fascinating. She writes "[...] the challenge Shakespeare constructs for this play is to put before us a Cressida, who, like the fair (but dark) lady of the sonnets is, in Eve Sedgwick's memorable term, 'oxymoron militant', a genuine contradiction."

Rutter has much to say on Cressida's self-awareness. Firstly, that Cressida is unique, that she "is something entirely, radically new, the woman who behaves like a man, who betrays the man," secondly, that, "two voices seem to be speaking [...] Where has Cressida learnt this 'instruction'? [...] the speech is neurotic, pragmatic, anti-romantic – yet its form is a sonnet [...] it discloses strategic schizophrenia [...] by this agenda, to win at love, a woman must play false, act double. She must separate instinct from sexual performance [...]".

Juliet Stevenson commented in Rutter's book Clamorous Voices that such roles inspire an actor to "react against the way tradition and prejudice have stigmatised them – Cressida the whore [...] every time they're judged you feel protective. Perhaps too protective. So you might end up playing a Cressida who is above reproach."

The main question as regards Shakespeare's Cressida is centralised around whether she is simply a "whore", or if she is more complex, and worth further attention due to her obvious intelligence and duality.

== In popular culture ==
In The Myth Makers, a 1965 storyline by Donald Cotton in the time-travel–based British science fiction television series Doctor Who, the character Vicki (played by Maureen O'Brien), a teenaged travelling companion of the Doctor, meets Priam, King of Troy who, disliking her name, dubs her Cressida. During the course of the story, Vicki/Cressida falls in love with Priam's son Troilus, and after the fall of Troy elects to stay with Troilus and rebuild the city. The story inverts the traditional fates of Troilus and Cressida, a change made to facilitate the departure of the Vicki character (and actress O'Brien) from the series.

The name Cressida is sometimes given, as a literary allusion, as a first name to faithless characters. In his 1969 novel Clean Straw for Nothing George Johnston's wife Charmian Clift is the basis for the character Cressida Morley; academics Paul Genoni and Tanya Dalziell suggest in their 2018 book Half the Perfect World that it was the impending publication of Johnston's novel, which Clift knew would lay bare her infidelities whilst on the island of Hydra, which prompted her to suicide in 1969. In the 2005 movie Hitch, a flashback scene shows the character of Cressida Baylor (played by Robinne Lee) betray the fidelity of the main character Hitch (played by Will Smith), thus negatively affecting his judgement and attitude toward love and women.

The progressive rock band Cressida is named after the character.

The Toyota Cressida, a mid-size car manufactured until 1992, was named after the character.
