= Geoffrey Chaucer =

English writer (1343–1400)

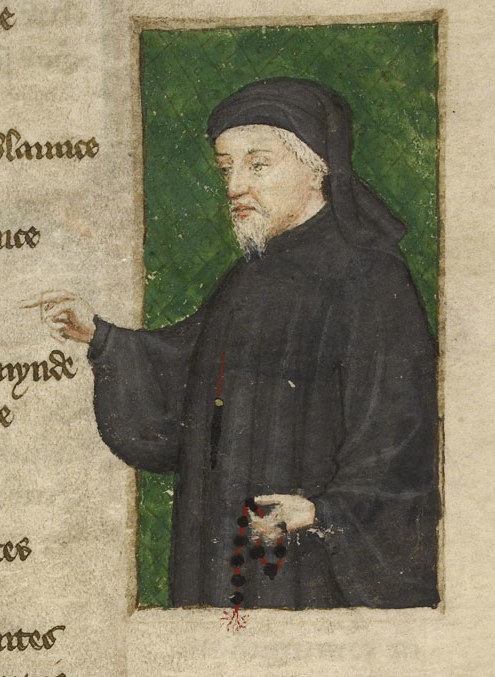
- 1412 portrait
- Born: c. 1343; London, England
- Died: 25 October 1400 (aged 56–57); London, England
- Resting place: Westminster Abbey
- Other names: Geffray Chaucer (orthographical variant); Geffroy Chaucer (orthographical variant)
- Occupations: Author; poet; philosopher; bureaucrat; diplomat
- Era: Plantagenet
- Spouse: Philippa Roet (m. 1366; died 1387)
- Children: 4, including Thomas
- Writing career
- Language: Middle English
- Years active: 1368–1400
- Period: Middle English literature
- Genres: Epic poem; lyric poem; short story; treatise
- Notable work: The Canterbury Tales
- Movement: Precursor to the English Renaissance

Geoffrey Chaucer (/ˈdʒɛfri ˈtʃɔːsər/; JEF-ree CHAW-sər; c. 1343 – 25 October 1400) was an English poet, writer and civil servant best known for The Canterbury Tales. He has been called the 'father of English literature', or alternatively, the 'father of English poetry'. He was the first writer to be buried in what has since become Poets' Corner in Westminster Abbey.

Chaucer also gained fame as a philosopher and amateur astronomer, composing the scientific A Treatise on the Astrolabe for his ten-year-old son, Lewis. He maintained a career in public service as a bureaucrat, courtier, diplomat and member of the Parliament of England, having been elected shire knight for Kent.

Amongst his other works are The Book of the Duchess, The House of Fame, The Legend of Good Women, Troilus and Criseyde, and Parlement of Foules. A prolific writer, Chaucer has been seen as crucial in legitimising the literary use of Middle English at a time when the dominant literary languages in England were still Anglo-Norman French and Latin. His contemporary Thomas Hoccleve hailed him as "the firste fyndere of our fair langage" (i.e., the first one capable of finding poetic matter in English). Almost two thousand English words are first attested in Chaucerian manuscripts.

== Life ==
=== Origin ===
Arms of Geoffrey Chaucer: Per pale argent and gules, a bend counterchanged

Geoffrey Chaucer was born in London, most likely in the early 1340s (by some accounts, including his monument, he was born in 1343), though the precise date and location remain unknown. His great-grandfather Andrew de Chaucer was a tavern keeper, his grandfather Robert Malyn le Chaucer worked as a purveyor of wines, and his father, John Chaucer, rose to become an important wine merchant with a royal appointment. Several previous generations of Geoffrey Chaucer's family had been vintners and merchants in Ipswich. His surname is derived from the French chaucier, which could refer in Middle English to a maker of shoes, boots, or chausses (leggings).

In 1324 his future father, John Chaucer, was kidnapped by an aunt in the hope of marrying the twelve-year-old to her daughter in an attempt to keep the Ipswich property in the family. The aunt was imprisoned and fined £250, now equivalent to about £200,000, suggesting the family was financially secure.

John Chaucer married Agnes Copton, who inherited properties in 1349, including 24 shops in London, from her uncle Hamo de Copton, who is described in a will dated 3 April 1354 and listed in the City Hustings Roll as 'moneyer', apparently employed at the Tower of London. In the City Hustings Roll 110, 5, Ric II, dated June 1380, Chaucer refers to himself as me Galfridum Chaucer, filium Johannis Chaucer, Vinetarii, Londonie, Latin for: "I, Geoffrey Chaucer, son of the vintner John Chaucer, London".

=== Career ===
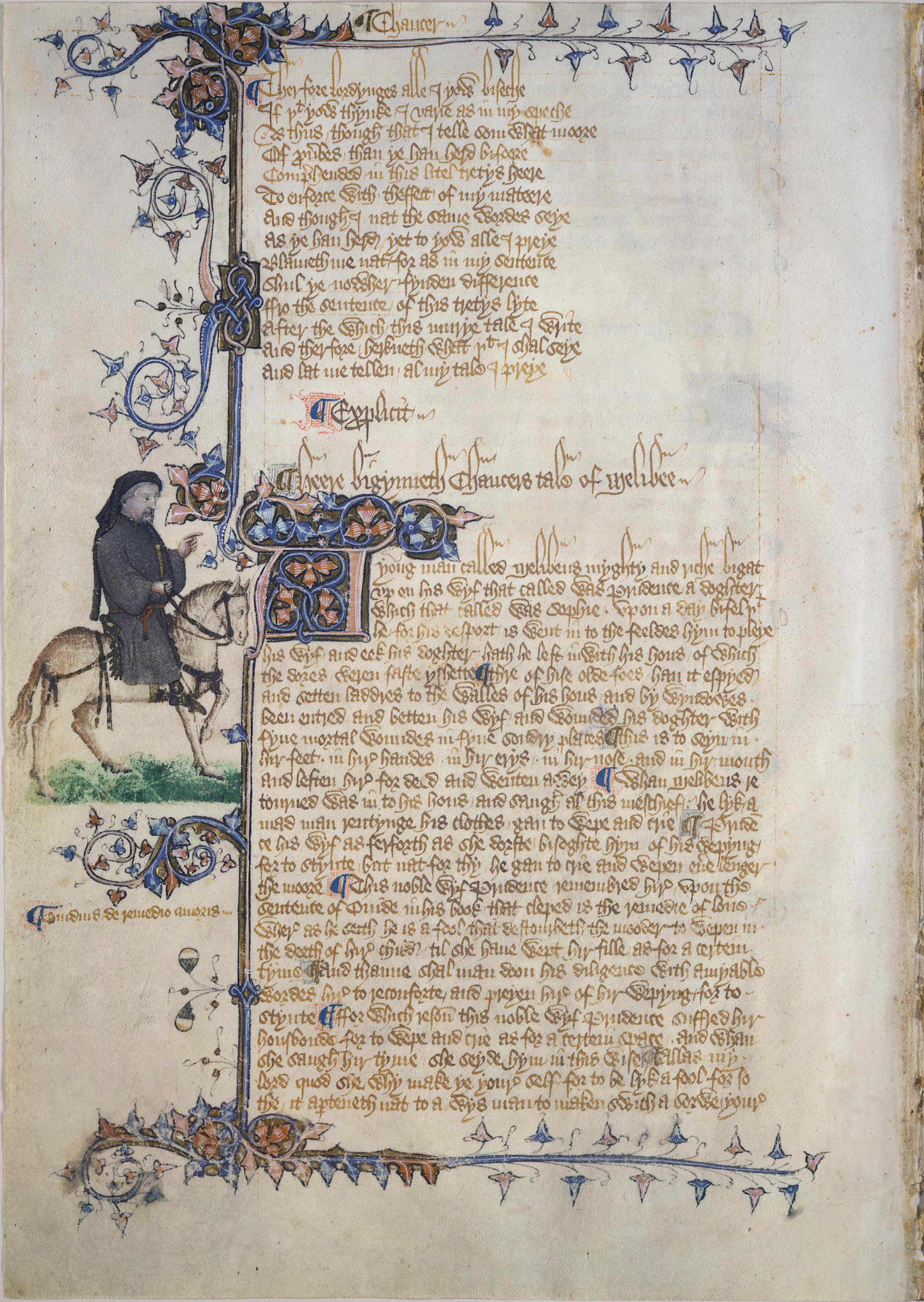
Chaucer as a pilgrim (from the early fifteenth-century Ellesmere manuscript of the Canterbury Tales)

Although records of the lives of Chaucer's contemporaries William Langland and the Gawain Poet are practically non-existent, Chaucer was a public servant whose official life was very well documented. Nearly 500 written items testify to his career. The first of the 'Chaucer Life Records' appears in 1357 in the household accounts of Elizabeth de Burgh, the Countess of Ulster, when he became the noblewoman's page through his father's connections, a common medieval form of apprenticeship for boys into knighthood or prestige appointments. De Burgh was married to Lionel of Antwerp, 1st Duke of Clarence, the second surviving son of Edward III; this position brought the teenage Chaucer into the close court circle, where he was to remain for the rest of his life. He was also employed as a courtier, a diplomat and a civil servant, as well as working for the king from 1389 to 1391 as Clerk of the King's Works.

In 1359, in the early stages of the Hundred Years' War, Edward invaded France. Chaucer travelled with Lionel of Antwerp, Elizabeth's husband, as part of the English army. In 1360 he was captured during the siege of Reims. The king paid £16 for his ransom, equivalent to £14,262 in 2025, and Chaucer was released.

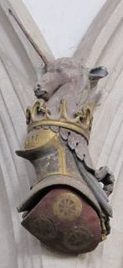
The Chaucer crest: A unicorn's head with canting arms of Roet below: Gules, three Catherine Wheels or (French: rouet = 'spinning-wheel'). Ewelme Church, Oxfordshire; possible funeral helm of his son Thomas Chaucer.

Chaucer's life is uncertain following this period. However he seems to have travelled in France, Spain and Flanders, possibly as a messenger and perhaps undertaking the Way of Saint James pilgrimage to Santiago de Compostela.

Around 1366 Chaucer married Philippa (de) Roet. She was a lady-in-waiting to Edward III's queen, Philippa of Hainault, and a sister of Katherine Swynford, who later (c. 1396) became the third wife of John of Gaunt. It is uncertain how many children Chaucer and Philippa had, but three or four are most commonly cited. His son, Thomas Chaucer, had an illustrious career as chief butler to four kings, envoy to France, and Speaker of the House of Commons. Thomas's daughter Alice married the Duke of Suffolk. Thomas's great-grandson (Geoffrey's great-great-grandson), John de la Pole, Earl of Lincoln, was heir to the throne as designated by Richard III before his deposition. Geoffrey's other children probably included Elizabeth Chaucy, a nun at Barking Abbey, Agnes, an attendant at Henry IV's coronation; and another son, Lewis Chaucer. Chaucer's "Treatise on the Astrolabe" was written for the latter.

According to tradition, Chaucer studied law in the Inner Temple (an Inn of Court) at this time. He became a member of the royal court of Edward III as a valet de chambre, yeoman, or esquire on 20 June 1367, a position which could entail a wide variety of tasks. His wife also received a pension for court employment. He travelled abroad many times, at least some of them in his role as a valet. In 1368, he may have attended the wedding of Lionel of Antwerp to Violante Visconti, daughter of Galeazzo II Visconti, in Milan. Jean Froissart and Petrarch, also notable literary figures, were also in attendance. Around this time, Chaucer is believed to have written The Book of the Duchess, his first major work, in honour of Blanche of Lancaster, the late wife of John of Gaunt who died from the plague in 1369.

The next year, Chaucer travelled to Picardy as part of a military expedition; in 1373 he visited Genoa and Florence. Scholars such as Walter William Skeat, Piero Boitani and Beryl Rowland have suggested that it was during the latter excursions that he came into contact with Petrarch or Boccaccio. They acquainted him with mediæval Italian poetry, whose forms and stories he would later employ. The purposes of a trip in 1377 are unclear, as it was known as a time of conflict. Later documents suggest it was a mission (alongside Jean Froissart) to arrange marriage between the future King Richard II and a French princess, thereby ending the Hundred Years' War. Were this the purpose of their trip, they seem to have been unsuccessful, as no wedding occurred.

In 1378 Richard II sent Chaucer as an envoy (secret dispatch) to the Visconti and Sir John Hawkwood, English condottiere (mercenary leader) in Milan. It has been speculated that it was Hawkwood on whom Chaucer based his character, the Knight, in the Canterbury Tales, for a description matches that of a 14th-century condottiere.

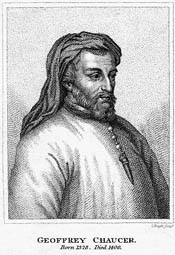
A nineteenth-century depiction of Chaucer

A possible indication that his career as a writer was appreciated came when Edward III granted Chaucer "a gallon of wine daily for the rest of his life" for some unspecified task. This was an unusual grant, but given on a day of celebration, Saint George's Day, 1374, when artistic endeavours were traditionally rewarded, it is assumed to have been for another early poetic work. It is not known which, if any, of Chaucer's extant works prompted the reward, but the suggestion of him as a poet to a king places him as a precursor to later poets laureate. Chaucer continued to collect the liquid stipend until Richard II came to power, after which it was converted to a monetary grant on 18 April 1378.

On 8 June 1374 Chaucer obtained the pivotal appointment as Comptroller of the Customs for the port of London. He was presumably well-received in the occupation: he held the position for twelve years, a lengthy titularship by then. The medievalist David Carlson has described Chaucer's job as "policing the collector ... The operating presumption was that the collector would try to cheat, and the comptroller would try to catch him at it; but at the same time, while the comptroller watched the collector, the Exchequer was watching the comptroller, who was evidently expected to try to cheat too". Chaucer appears to have been close to the Court party in politics; of the 11 men prosecuted for treason by the Lords Appellant in 1388, he was an associate of eight.

His life goes undocumented for much of the next ten years, but it is believed that he wrote (or began) most of his famous works during this period.

On 16 October 1379 Thomas Staundon filed legal action against his former servant Cecily Chaumpaigne and Chaucer, accusing the latter of unlawfully employing Chaumpaigne before her term of service was completed, in violation of the Statute of Labourers. Though eight court documents dated between October 1379 and July 1380 survive the action, the case was never prosecuted. No details survive about Chaumpaigne's service or how she came to leave Staundon's employ for Chaucer's. (Note: Frederick James Furnivall discovered the case in 1873 via a quitclaim filed by Chaumpaigne releasing Chaucer from any legal responsibility for "all manner of actions related to [her] raptus" (Latin: "omnimodas acciones, tam de raptu meo"). Furnivall, Chaucer biographers, and feminist scholars speculated that Chaucer may have raped or abducted Chaumpaigne. However, in 2022, Euan Roger and Sebastian Sobecki discovered two additional documents from the case in the British National Archives, revealing that "raptus" referred to the illegal transfer of service from Staundon's household to Chaucer's and that the case was a labour dispute in which Chaucer and Chaumpaigne were co-defendants. Roger and Prescott commented that "the carefully curated, small-scale world of literary manuscripts...is far removed from the vast scale of government archives...[this discovery] demonstrates that there is more to be found".)

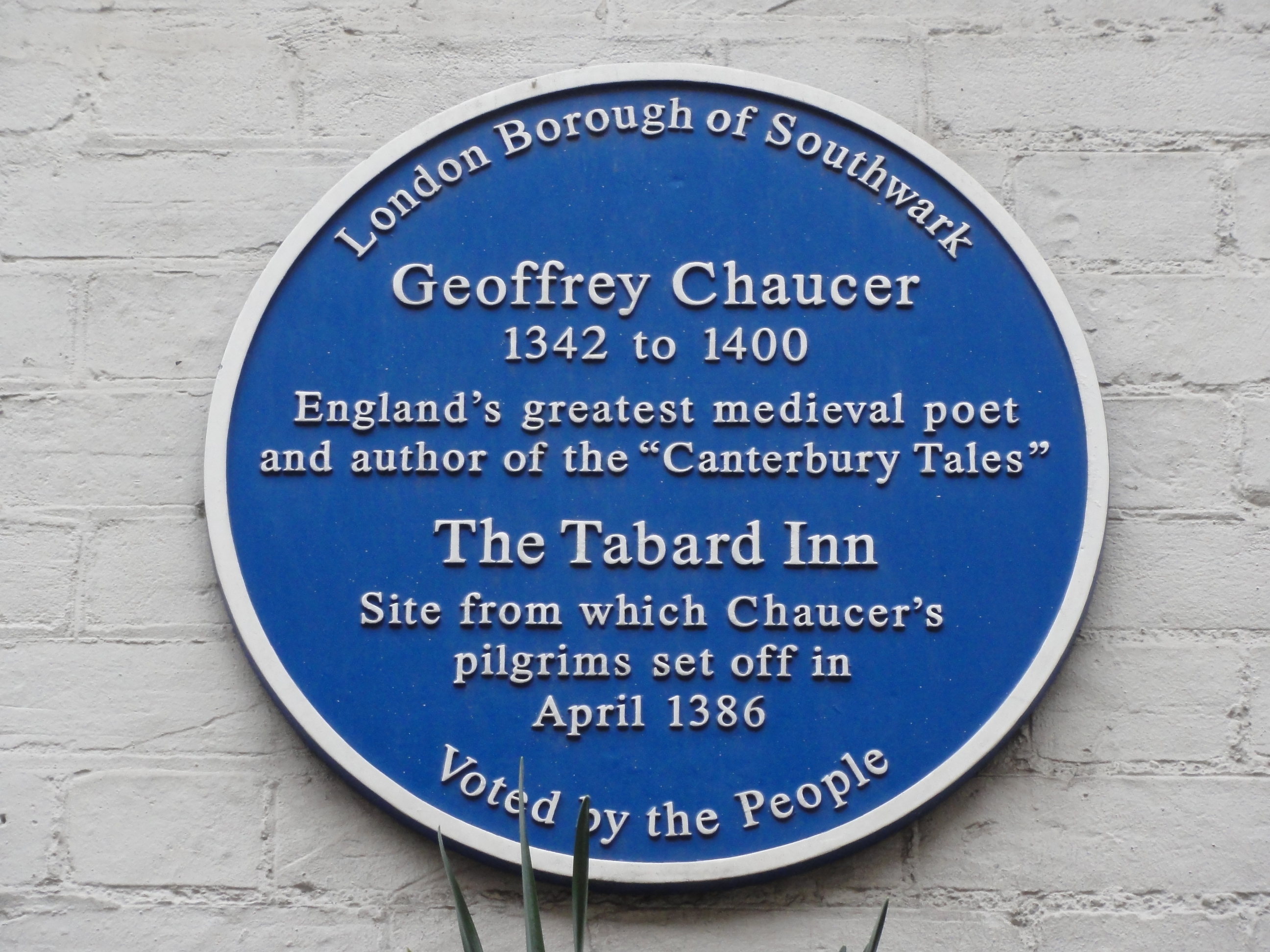
Blue plaque at the site of the Tabard inn in Southwark, London, where in 1386 the pilgrims in The Canterbury Tales set off to visit Canterbury Cathedral

While still working as comptroller, Chaucer appears to have moved to Kent, being appointed as one of the commissioners of peace for Kent at a time when French invasion was a possibility. He is thought to have started work on The Canterbury Tales in the early 1380s. He also became a member of parliament (a knight of the shire) for Kent in 1386 and attended the 'Wonderful Parliament' that year. He appears to have attended most of the 71 days it sat, for which he was paid 24 pounds and nine shillings. On 15 October that year he gave a deposition in the case of Scrope v. Grosvenor. There is no further reference after this date to Philippa, Chaucer's wife. She is presumed to have died in 1387. He survived the political upheavals caused by the Lords Appellants, despite the fact that Chaucer knew some of the men executed over the affair quite well.

On 12 July 1389 Chaucer was appointed the clerk of the king's works, a sort of foreman organising most of the king's building projects. No major works were begun during his tenure, but he did conduct repairs on Westminster Palace, St George's Chapel, Windsor, continued building the wharf at the Tower of London and built the stands for a tournament held in 1390. It may have been a difficult job, but it paid two shillings a day, more than three times his salary as a comptroller. Chaucer was also appointed keeper of the lodge at the King's Park in Feckenham Forest in Worcestershire, which was a largely honorary appointment.

=== Later life ===
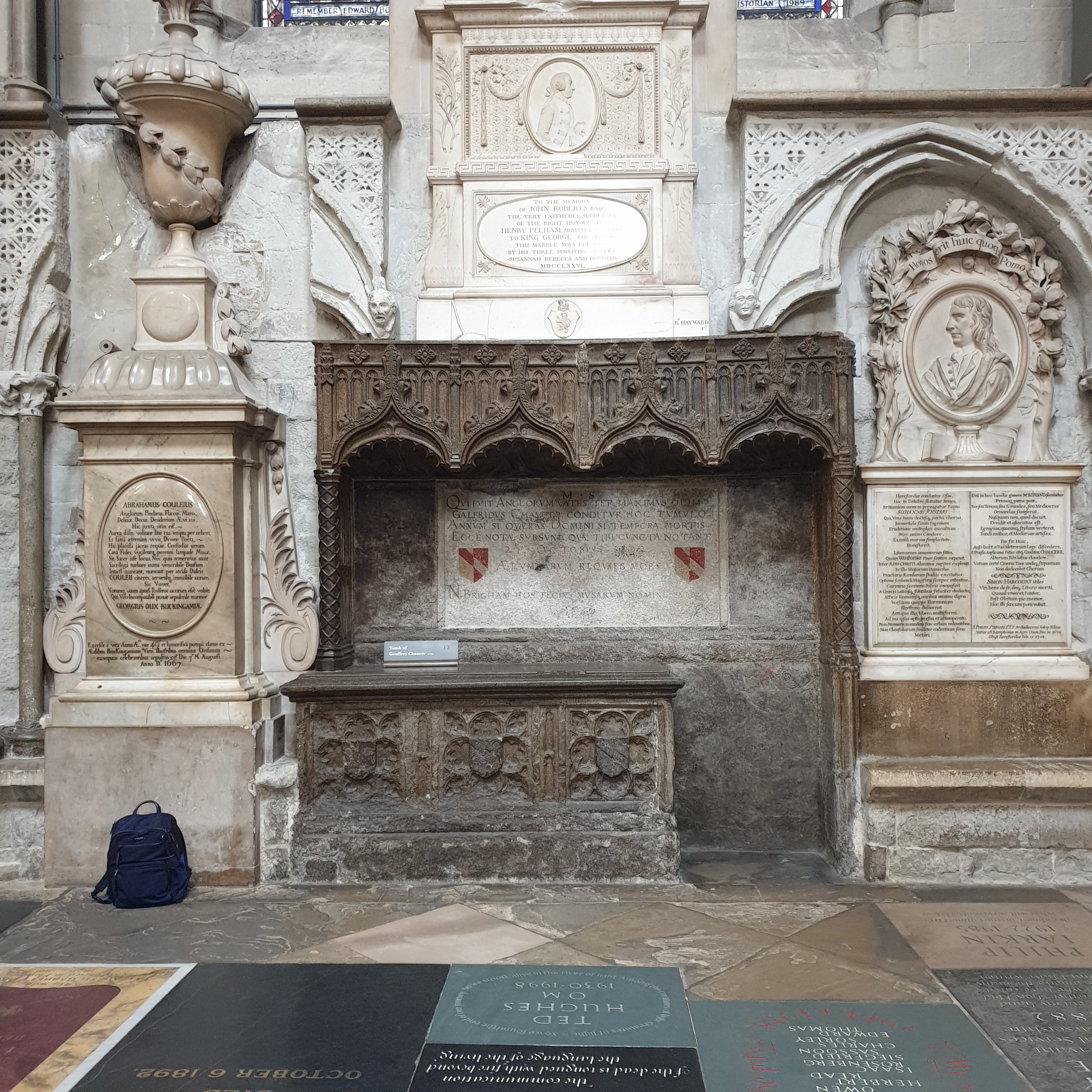
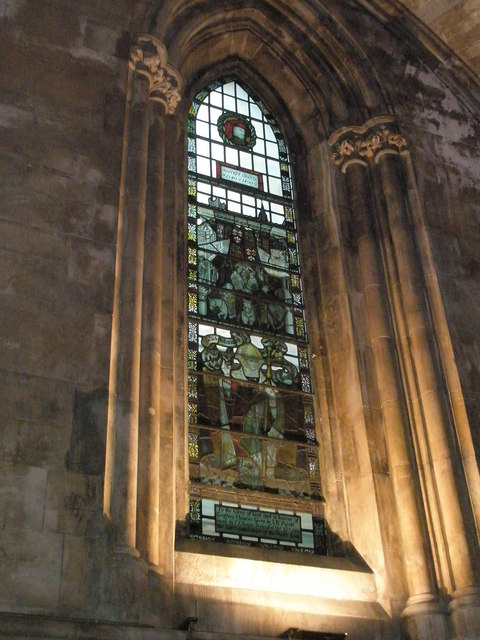
Left: Chaucer's tomb in Poets' Corner, Westminster Abbey, London. He was the first writer to be interred at the Abbey; the Purbeck marble monument was erected in 1556. Right: stained-glass window commemorating Chaucer in the north wall of Southwark Cathedral.

In September 1390, records say that Chaucer was robbed and possibly injured while conducting the business, and he stopped working in this capacity on 17 June 1391. He began as Deputy Forester in the royal forest of Petherton Park in North Petherton, Somerset on 22 June. It involved administering an area which included moorland, cultivated fields, villages and a forest.

Richard II granted him an annual pension of 20 pounds in 1394 (equivalent to £22,238 in 2025), and Chaucer's name fades from the historical record not long after Richard's overthrow in 1399. The last few records of his life show his pension renewed by the new king and his taking a lease on a residence within the close of Westminster Abbey on 24 December 1399. Henry IV renewed the grants assigned by Richard, but The Complaint of Chaucer to his Purse hints that the grants might not have been paid. The last mention of Chaucer is on 5 June 1400, when some debts owed to him were repaid.

Chaucer died of unknown causes on 25 October 1400, although the only evidence for this date comes from the engraving on his tomb, which was erected more than 100 years after his death. There is some speculation that he was murdered by enemies of Richard II or even on the orders of his successor Henry IV, but the case is entirely circumstantial. Chaucer was buried in Westminster Abbey in London, as was his right owing to his status as a tenant of the Abbey's close. In 1556, his remains were transferred to a more ornate tomb, making him the first writer interred in the area now known as Poets' Corner.

== Relationship to John of Gaunt ==
Chaucer was a close friend of John of Gaunt, the wealthy Duke of Lancaster and father of Henry IV, and he served under Lancaster's patronage. Near the end of their lives, Lancaster and Chaucer became brothers-in-law when Lancaster married Katherine Swynford (de Roet) in 1396; she was the sister of Philippa (de) Roet, whom Chaucer had married in 1366.

Chaucer's The Book of the Duchess (also known as the Deeth of Blaunche the Duchesse) was written to commemorate Blanche of Lancaster, John of Gaunt's first wife. The poem refers to John and Blanche in allegory as the narrator relates the tale of "A long castel with walles white/Be Seynt Johan, on a ryche hil" (1318–1319) who is mourning grievously after the death of his love, "And goode faire White she het/That was my lady name ryght" (948–949). The phrase "long castel" is a reference to Lancaster (also called "Loncastel" and "Longcastell"), "walles white" is thought to be an oblique reference to Blanche, "Seynt Johan" was John of Gaunt's name-saint, and "ryche hil" is a reference to Richmond. These references reveal the identity of the grieving black knight of the poem as John of Gaunt, Duke of Lancaster and Earl of Richmond. "White" is the English translation of the French word "blanche", implying that the white lady was Blanche of Lancaster.

=== Poem Fortune ===
Chaucer's short poem Fortune, believed to have been written in the 1390s, is also thought to refer to Lancaster. "Chaucer as narrator" openly defies Fortune, proclaiming that he has learned who his enemies are through her tyranny and deceit, and declares "my suffisaunce" (15) and that "over himself hath the maystrye" (14).

Fortune, in turn, does not understand Chaucer's harsh words to her for she believes that she has been kind to him, claims that he does not know what she has in store for him in the future, but most importantly, "And eek thou hast thy beste frend alyve" (32, 40, 48). Chaucer retorts, "My frend maystow nat reven, blind goddesse" (50) and orders her to take away those who merely pretend to be his friends.

Fortune turns her attention to three princes whom she implores to relieve Chaucer of his pain and "Preyeth his beste frend of his noblesse/That to som beter estat he may atteyne" (78–79). The three princes are believed to represent the dukes of Lancaster, York, and Gloucester, and a portion of line 76 ("as three of you or tweyne") is thought to refer to the ordinance of 1390 which specified that no royal gift could be authorised without the consent of at least two of the three dukes.

Most conspicuous in this short poem is the number of references to Chaucer's "beste frend". Fortune states three times in her response to the plaintiff, "And also, you still have your best friend alive" (32, 40, 48); she also refers to his "beste frend" in the envoy when appealing to his "noblesse" to help Chaucer to a higher estate. The narrator makes a fifth reference when he rails at Fortune that she shall not take his friend from him.

== Religious beliefs ==
Chaucer's works engage heavily with the theme of Christian faith. The figure of the Parson portrays Christianity positively. However, Chaucer also ruthlessly satirises religious professionals whom he dislikes, depicting friars and summoners squabbling and telling scandalous tales about each other, and a shameless conman in the form of the Pardoner.

The Canterbury Tales ends with a section that has come to be known as Chaucer's "Retraction". In full and in translation:

Now pray I to them all that listen to this little treatise or read it, that if there be any thing in it that pleases them, that thereof they thank our Lord Jesus Christ, from whom proceeds all wit and all goodness. And if there be any thing that displeases them, I pray them also that they blame it on the fault of my lack of wit and not to my will, that would much prefer to have said better if I had had cunning. For our book says, "All that is written is written for our doctrine," and that is my intent. Wherefore I beseech you meekly, for the mercy of God, that you pray for me that Christ have mercy on me and forgive me my sins; and namely of my translations and compositions of worldly vanities, as is the book of Troilus; the book also of Fame; the book of the XXV. Ladies; the book of the Duchesse; the book of Saint Valentines day of the Parliament of Birds; the tales of Canterbury, those that tend toward sin; the book of the Lion; and many another book, if they were in my remembrance, and many a song and many a lecherous lyric, that Christ for his great mercy forgive me the sin. But of the translation of Boethius's Consolation of Philosophy, and other books of legends of saints, and homilies, and morality, and devotion, that thank I our Lord Jesus Christ and his blissful Mother, and all the saints of heaven, beseeching them that they from henceforth unto my life's end send me grace to bewail my sins and to study to the salvation of my soul, and grant me grace of true penitence, confession and satisfaction to do in this present life, through the benign grace of him that is king of kings and priest over all priests, that bought us with the precious blood of his heart, so that I may be one of them at the day of doom that shall be saved. Qui cum Patre et Spiritu Sancto vivit et regnat Deus per omnia secula. [He who lives and reigns with the Father and Holy Spirit, God, world without end.] Amen.

Both the sincerity and the authenticity of the "Retraction" have been questioned. One recent edition concludes that "the Retraction ends the Canterbury Tales with a final complexity; repentant or not, Chaucer, as usual, slyly leaves the resolution to the reader".

== Literary works ==
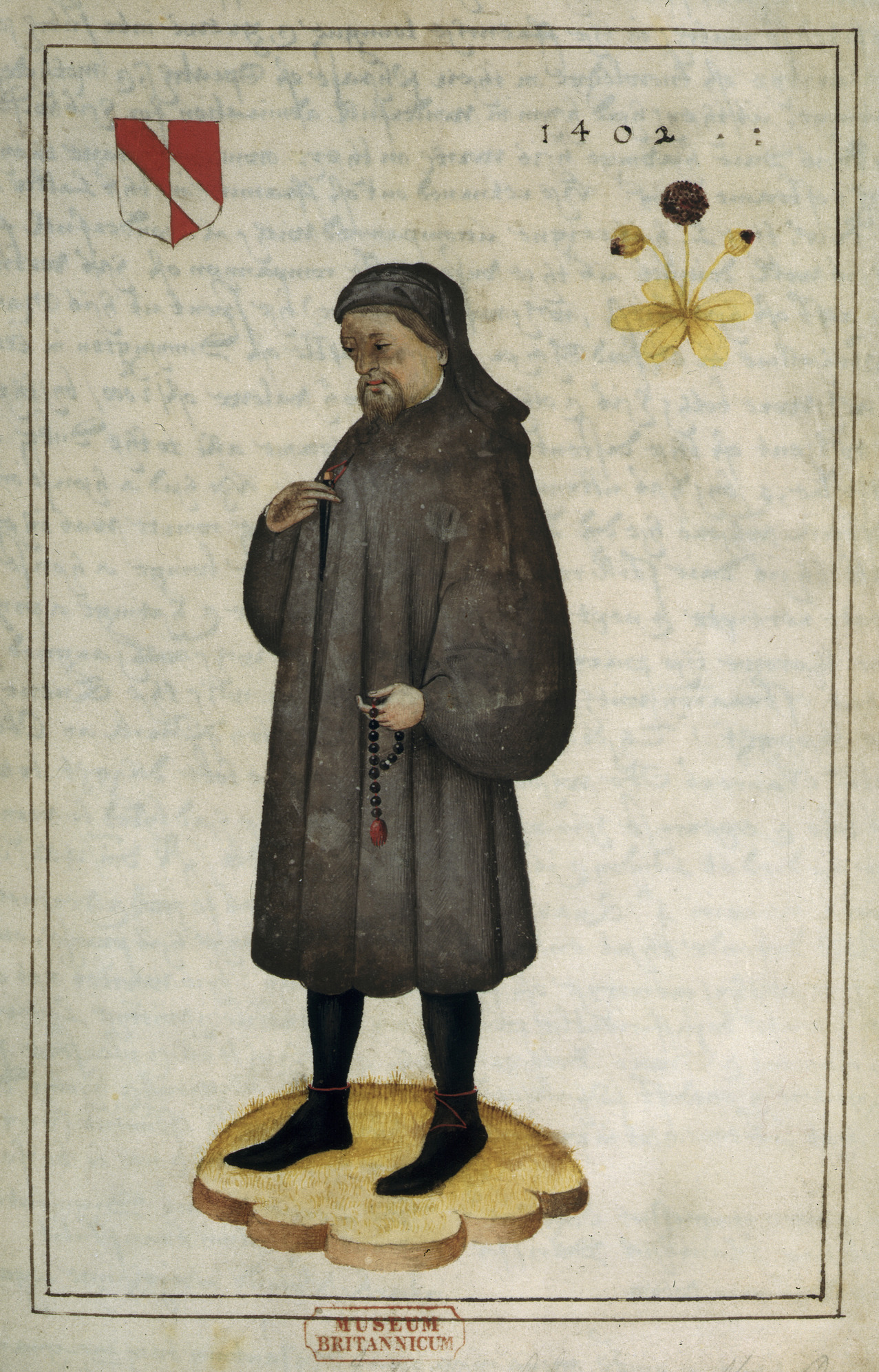
A sixteenth-century portrait of Chaucer. The arms are: Per pale argent and gules, a bend counterchanged.

Chaucer's first major work was The Book of the Duchess, an elegy for Blanche of Lancaster, who died in 1368. Two other early poems were Anelida and Arcite and The House of Fame. He wrote many of his major works in a prolific period when he worked as customs comptroller for London (1374 to 1386). His Parlement of Foules, The Legend of Good Women, and Troilus and Criseyde all date from this time. It is believed that he began The Canterbury Tales in the 1380s.

Chaucer also translated Boethius' Consolation of Philosophy and The Romance of the Rose by Guillaume de Lorris (extended by Jean de Meun). Eustache Deschamps called himself a "nettle in Chaucer's garden of poetry". In 1385 Thomas Usk made glowing mention of Chaucer, and John Gower also lauded him.

His Treatise on the Astrolabe, dedicated to his ten-year-old son Lewis Chaucer, describes the form and use of the astrolabe in detail and is sometimes cited as the first example of technical writing in the English language. It indicates that Chaucer was versed in science in addition to his literary talents. The equatorie of the planetis is a scientific work similar to the Treatise and sometimes ascribed to Chaucer because of its language and handwriting, an identification which scholars no longer deem tenable.

== Influence ==
=== Linguistic ===
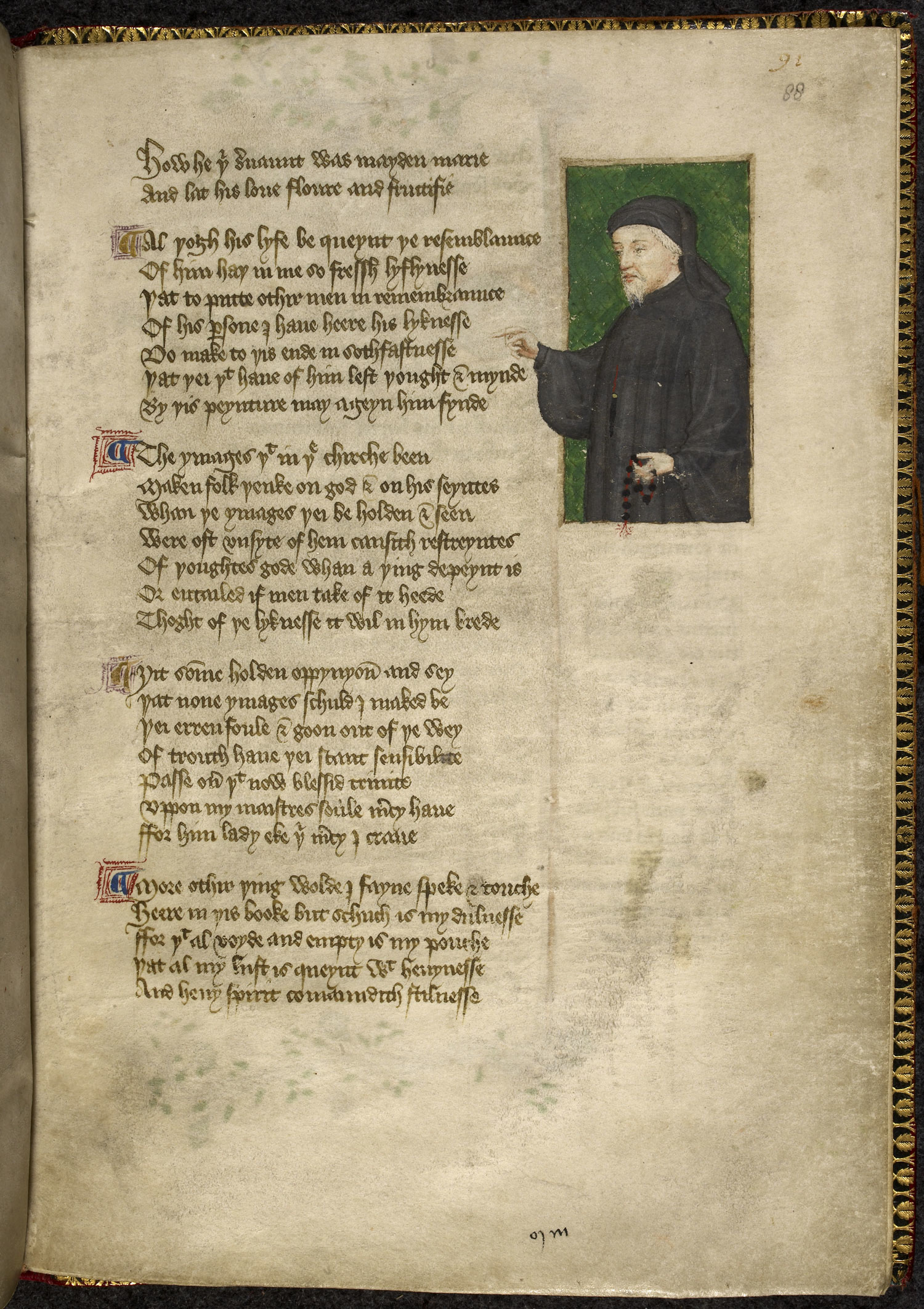
Portrait of Chaucer from a 1412 manuscript by Thomas Hoccleve, who may have met Chaucer

Chaucer wrote in continental accentual-syllabic metre, a style which had developed in English literature since around the twelfth century as an alternative to the alliterative Anglo-Saxon metre. Chaucer is known for metrical innovation: he invented the rhyme royal, and was one of the first English poets to use the five-stress line—a decasyllabic cousin to iambic pentametre—in his work. Only a few anonymous short works employ it before he did. The arrangements of these five-stress lines into rhyming couplets, as first observed in The Legend of Good Women, were much used in his later work, from thereon becoming one of the standard poetic forms in English. His early pioneering in satire is also of importance: the common humorous mechanism, the quaint accent of regional dialect, appears in The Reeve's Tale. Regarded by historians as the first use of dialect as comedic device in English literature, J. R. R. Tolkien regarded it as "dramatic realism".

Along with those of other contemporaneous writers, Chaucer's body of poetry is credited with helping to standardise the London dialect of Middle English from a combination of the Kentish and Midlands dialects. This is probable overstatement; the influence of the court, chancery and bureaucracy – of which Chaucer was a part – remains more salient to the development of Standard English.

Modern English is somewhat distanced from the language of Chaucer's poems, owing to the effect of the Great Vowel Shift sometime after his death. This change in the pronunciation of English, still not fully understood, often encumbers modern audiences reading his work.

The status of the final -e in Chaucer's verse is uncertain: it seems likely that during the period of Chaucer's writing, the final -e was dropping out of colloquial English and that its use was somewhat irregular. This may have been a vestige of the Old English dative singular suffix -e attached to most nouns. Chaucer's versification suggests that the final -e is sometimes to be vocalised and sometimes to be silent; however, this remains a point on which there is disagreement. Most scholars pronounce it as a schwa when it is vocalised.

Besides the irregular spelling, much of the vocabulary is recognisable to the modern reader. Chaucer is also recorded in the Oxford English Dictionary as the first author to use many common English words in his writings. These words were probably frequently used in the language at the time, but Chaucer was the earliest extant manuscript source with his ear for common speech. Acceptable, alkali, altercation, amble, angrily, annex, annoyance, approaching, arbitration, armless, army, arrogant, arsenic, arc, artillery and aspect are just some of almost two thousand English words first attested by Chaucer.

=== Literary ===
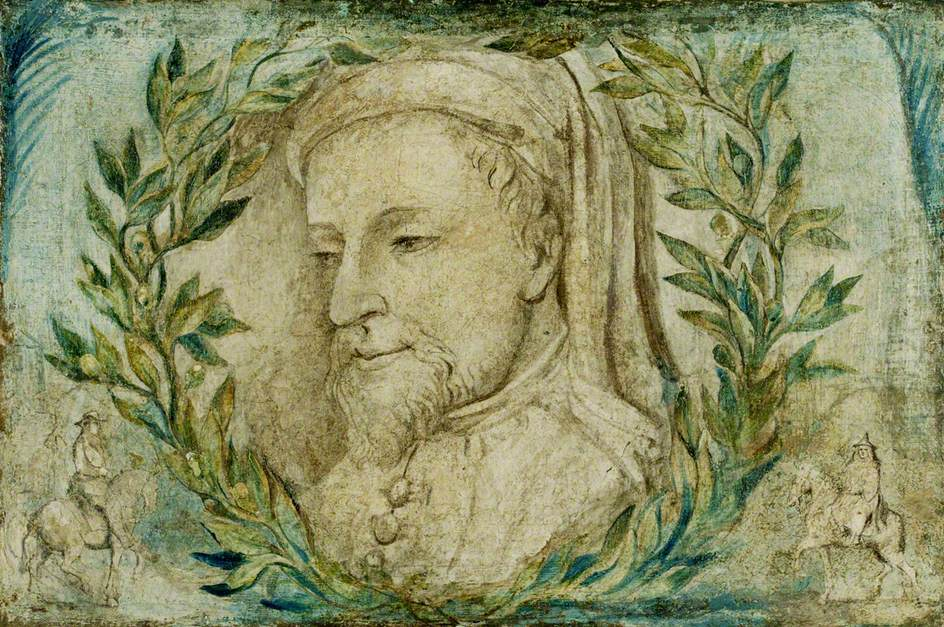
Portrait of Chaucer by William Blake, c. 1800

Widespread knowledge of Chaucer's works is attested by the many poets who imitated or responded to his writing. John Lydgate was one of the earliest poets to write continuations of Chaucer's unfinished Tales. At the same time Robert Henryson's The Testament of Cresseid completes the story of Cressida left unfinished in his Troilus and Criseyde. Many of the manuscripts of Chaucer's works contain material from these poets, and later appreciations by the Romantic era poets were shaped by their failure to distinguish the later "additions" from the original Chaucer.

Writers of the 17th and 18th centuries, such as John Dryden, admired Chaucer for his stories but not for his rhythm and rhyme, as few critics could then read Middle English and the text had been butchered by printers, leaving a somewhat unadmirable mess. It was not until the late 19th century that the official Chaucerian canon, accepted today, was decided upon, largely as a result of Walter William Skeat's work. Roughly seventy-five years after Chaucer's death, The Canterbury Tales was selected by William Caxton as one of the first books to be printed in England.

=== English ===
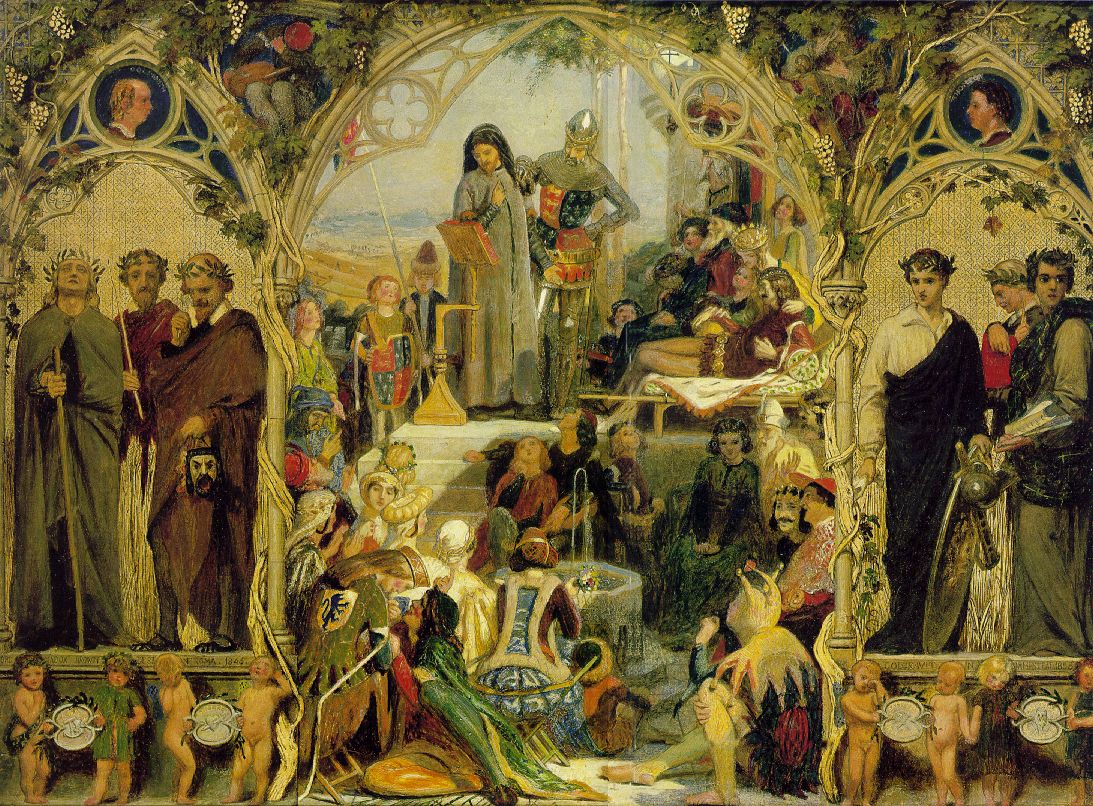
The Seeds and Fruits of English Poetry by Ford Madox Brown (1845): Chaucer stands in the middle (next to Edward the Black Prince), surrounded by various poets including William Shakespeare, John Milton, Lord Byron and Robert Burns

Chaucer is often considered the source of the English vernacular tradition; he championed the English language over the then-dominant use of Latin or French in England in art and the judiciary. His achievement for the language can be seen as part of a general historical trend towards the creation of vernacular literature, after the example of Dante Alighieri, in many parts of Europe. A parallel trend in Chaucer's lifetime was underway in Lowland Scotland through the work of his contemporary John Barbour.

Although Chaucer's language is much closer to the modern vernacular than the text of Beowulf, such that (unlike that of Beowulf) a Modern English speaker well-versed in archaisms may generally understand it, it differs enough that most publications modernise his idiom.

The following excerpt from the prologue of The Summoner's Tale compares Chaucer's text to a modern translation:

| In Middle English | In modern British English |
| This frere bosteth that he knoweth helle, | This friar boasts that he knows hell, |
| And God it woot, that it is litel wonder; | And God knows that it is little wonder; |
| Freres and feendes been but lyte asonder. | Friars and fiends are seldom far apart. |
| For, pardee, ye han ofte tyme herd telle | For, by God, you have ofttimes heard tell |
| How that a frere ravyshed was to helle | How a friar was taken to hell |
| In spirit ones by a visioun; | In spirit, once by a vision; |
| And as an angel ladde hym up and doun, | And as an angel led him up and down, |
| To shewen hym the peynes that the were, | To show him the pains that were there, |
| In al the place saugh he nat a frere; | In all the place he saw not a friar; |
| Of oother folk he saugh ynowe in wo. | Of other folk he saw enough in woe. |
| Unto this angel spak the frere tho: | Unto this angel spoke the friar thus: |
| Now, sire, quod he, han freres swich a grace | "Now sir", said he, "Have friars such a grace |
| That noon of hem shal come to this place? | That none of them come to this place?" |
| Yis, quod this aungel, many a millioun! | "Yes", said the angel, "many a million!" |
| And unto sathanas he ladde hym doun. | And unto Satan the angel led him down. |
| –And now hath sathanas, –seith he, –a tayl | "And now Satan has", he said, "a tail, |
| Brodder than of a carryk is the sayl. | Broader than a galleon's sail. |
| Hold up thy tayl, thou sathanas!–quod he; | Hold up your tail, Satan!" said he. |
| –shewe forth thyn ers, and lat the frere se | "Show forth your arse, and let the friar see |
| Where is the nest of freres in this place!– | Where the nest of friars is in this place!" |
| And er that half a furlong wey of space, | And before half a furlong of space, |
| Right so as bees out swarmen from an hyve, | Just as bees swarm out from a hive, |
| Out of the develes ers ther gonne dryve | Out of the devil's arse there were driven |
| Twenty thousand freres on a route, | Twenty thousand friars on a rout, |
| And thurghout helle swarmed al aboute, | And throughout hell swarmed all about, |
| And comen agayn as faste as they may gon, | And came again as fast as they could go, |
| And in his ers they crepten everychon. | And every one crept into his arse. |
| He clapte his tayl agayn and lay ful stille. | He shut his tail again and lay very still. |

=== Valentine's Day and romance ===
The first recorded association of Valentine's Day with romantic love is believed to be in Chaucer's Parlement of Foules (1382), a dream vision portraying a parliament for birds to choose their mates. This verse honours the first anniversary of the engagement of the fifteen-year-old Richard II of England to fifteen-year-old Anne of Bohemia:

For this was on seynt Volantynys day
Whan euery bryd comyth there to chese his make
Of euery kynde that men thinke may
And that so heuge a noyse gan they make
That erthe & eyr & tre & euery lake
So ful was that onethe was there space
For me to stonde, so ful was al the place.

== Critical reception ==
=== Early criticism ===
"The language of England, upon which Chaucer was the first to confer celebrity, has amply justified the foresight which led him to disdain all others for its sake, and, in turn, has conferred an enduring celebrity upon him who trusted his reputation to it without reserve."

— Thomas Lounsbury

Thomas Hoccleve, a poet who may have met Chaucer, hailed him as "the firste fyndere of our fair langage" and considered him his role model. John Lydgate referred to Chaucer within his own text The Fall of Princes as the "lodesterre (guiding principle) … off our language". Around two centuries later Sir Philip Sidney greatly praised Troilus and Criseyde in his own Defence of Poesie. During the nineteenth and early twentieth century, Chaucer came to be viewed as a symbol of the nation's poetic heritage.

Charles Dickens echoed Chaucer's use of Luke 23:34 from Troilus and Criseyde (Dickens held a copy in his library among other works of Chaucer) in his 1850 novel David Copperfield. G. K. Chesterton wrote: "among the great canonical English authors, Chaucer and Dickens have the most in common".

=== Manuscripts and audience ===
The large number of surviving manuscripts of Chaucer's works is testimony to the enduring interest in his poetry prior to the arrival of the printing press. There survive 83 manuscripts of The Canterbury Tales (in whole or part) alone, along with sixteen of Troilus and Criseyde, including the personal copy of Henry IV. Given the ravages of time, it is likely that these surviving manuscripts represent hundreds since lost.

Chaucer's original audience was a courtly one; they would have included women, as well as men of the upper social classes. Yet, even before his death in 1400, Chaucer's audience had begun to include members of the rising literate, middle and merchant classes. This included many Lollard sympathisers who may well have been inclined to read Chaucer as one of their own.

Lollards were particularly attracted to Chaucer's satirical writings about friars, priests, and other church officials. In 1464, John Baron, a tenant farmer in Agmondesham (Amersham in Buckinghamshire), was brought before John Chadworth, the Bishop of Lincoln, on charges of being a Lollard heretic; he confessed to owning a "boke of the Tales of Caunterburie" among other suspect volumes.

=== Printed editions ===
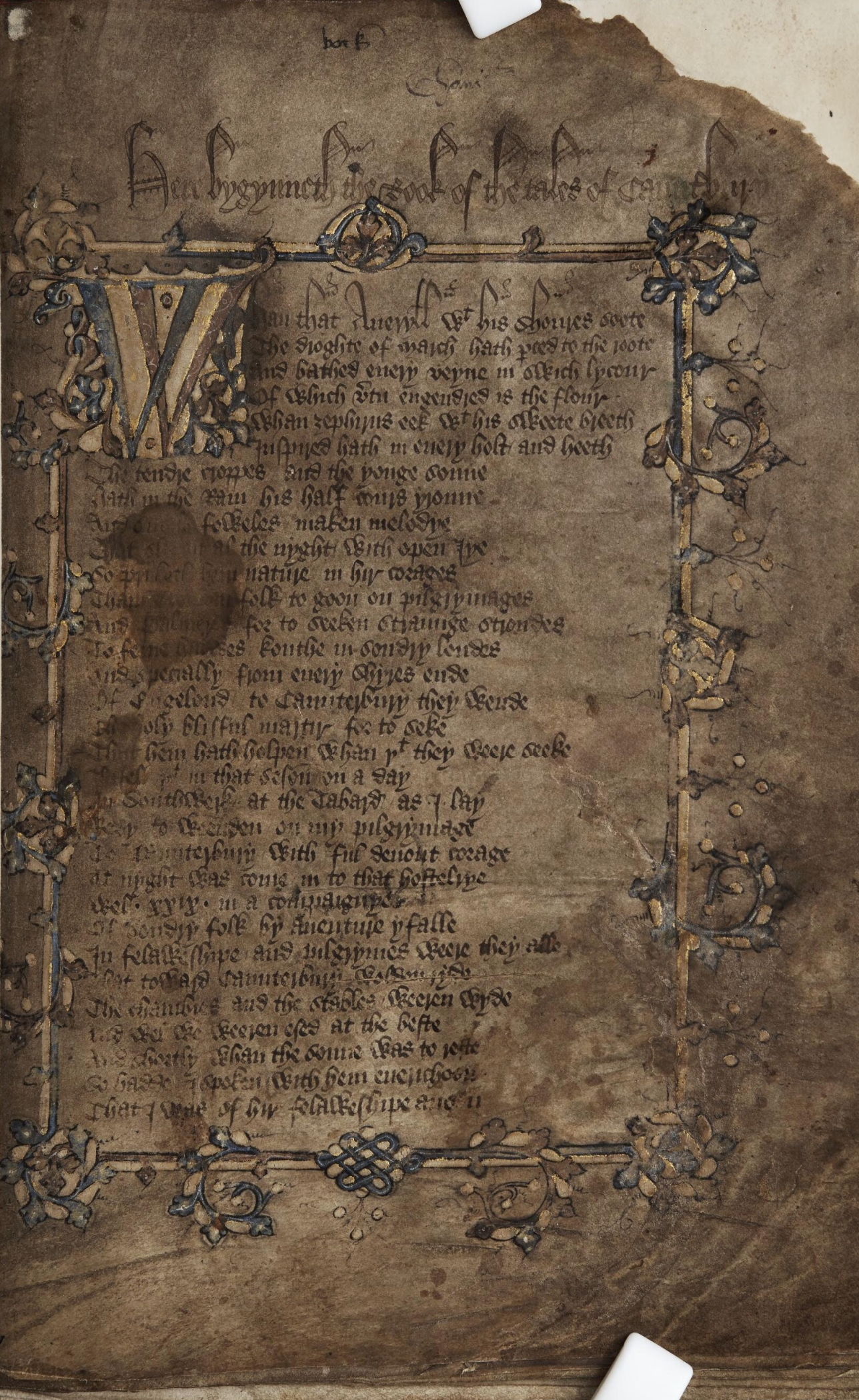
Title page of The Canterbury Tales, c. 1400

The first English printer, William Caxton, was responsible for the first two folio editions of The Canterbury Tales published in 1478 and 1483. Caxton's second printing, by his own account, came about because a customer complained that the printed text differed from a manuscript he knew; Caxton obligingly used the man's manuscript as his source. Both Caxton editions carry the equivalent of manuscript authority. Caxton's edition was reprinted by his successor, Wynkyn de Worde, but this edition has no independent authority.

Richard Pynson, the King's Printer under Henry VIII for about twenty years, was the first to collect and sell something that resembled an edition of the collected works of Chaucer; however, in the process, he introduced five previously printed texts that are now known not to be Chaucer's. (The collection is actually three separately printed texts, or collections of texts, bound together as one volume.)

There is a likely connection between Pynson's product and William Thynne's a mere six years later. Thynne had a successful career from the 1520s until his death in 1546 as chief clerk of the kitchen of Henry VIII, one of the masters of the royal household. He spent years comparing various versions of Chaucer's works and selected 41 pieces for publication. While there were questions over the authorship of some of the material, there is no doubt that this was the first comprehensive view of Chaucer's work. The Workes of Geffray Chaucer, published in 1532, was the first edition of Chaucer's collected works. Thynne's editions of Chaucer's Works in 1532 and 1542 were the first significant contributions to the existence of a widely recognised Chaucerian canon. Thynne represents his edition as a book sponsored by and supportive of the king, who is praised in the preface by Sir Brian Tuke. Thynne's canon brought the number of apocryphal works associated with Chaucer to a total of 28, even if that was not his intention. As with Pynson, once included in the Works, pseudepigraphic texts stayed with those works, regardless of their first editor's intentions.

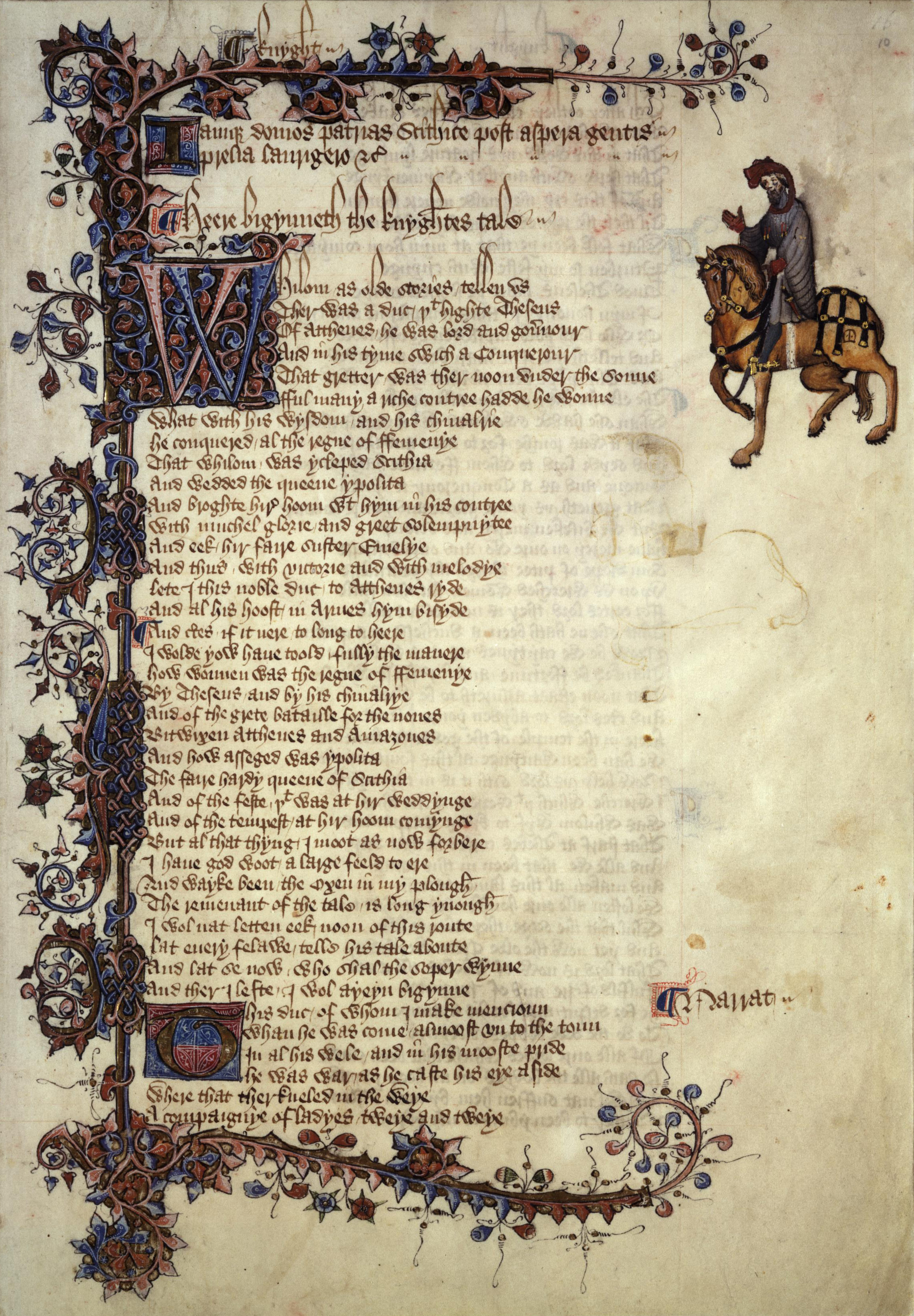
Opening page of The Knight's Tale, the first tale from Canterbury Tales; from the Ellesmere Manuscript held in the Huntington Library in San Marino, California

In the 16th and 17th centuries Chaucer was printed more than any other English author, and he was the first author to have his works collected in comprehensive single-volume editions in which a Chaucer canon began to cohere. Some scholars contend that 16th-century editions of Chaucer's Works set the precedent for all other English authors regarding presentation, prestige and success in print. These editions certainly established Chaucer's reputation, but they also began the complicated process of reconstructing and frequently inventing Chaucer's biography and the canonical list of works which were attributed to him.

The most significant shift in the reception of Chaucer's work was the inclusion of apocryphal medieval texts in early print editions, beginning with Thynne's. By incorporating writings like Testament of Love and The Plowman's Tale, early modern editors recast Chaucer as a proto-Protestant Lollard. As "Chaucerian" works that were not considered apocryphal until the late 19th century, these medieval texts enjoyed a new life, with English Protestants carrying on the earlier Lollard project of appropriating existing texts and authors who seemed sympathetic—or malleable enough to be construed as sympathetic—to their cause. The official Chaucer of the early printed volumes of his Works was construed as a proto-Protestant as the same was done concurrently with William Langland and Piers Plowman.

The famous Plowman's Tale did not enter Thynne's Works until the second 1542 edition. Its entry was surely facilitated by Thynne's inclusion of Thomas Usk's Testament of Love in the first edition. The Testament of Love imitates, borrows from, and thus resembles Usk's contemporary, Chaucer. (Testament of Love also appears to borrow from Piers Plowman.)

Since the Testament of Love mentions its author's part in a failed plot (book 1, chapter 6), his imprisonment, and (perhaps) a recantation of (possibly Lollardism) heresy, all this was associated with Chaucer. (Usk himself was executed as a traitor in 1388.) John Foxe took this recantation of heresy as a defence of the true faith, calling Chaucer a "right Wiclevian" and (erroneously) identifying him as a schoolmate and close friend of John Wycliffe at Merton College, Oxford. (Thomas Speght is careful to highlight these facts in his editions and his "Life of Chaucer".) No other sources for the Testament of Love exist—there is only Thynne's construction of whatever manuscript sources he had.

John Stow (1525–1605) was an antiquarian and also a chronicler. His edition of Chaucer's Works in 1561 brought the apocrypha to more than 50 titles. More were added in the 17th century, and they remained as late as 1810, well after Thomas Tyrwhitt pared the canon down in his 1775 edition. The compilation and printing of Chaucer's works was, from its beginning, a political enterprise, since it was intended to establish an English national identity and history that grounded and authorised the Tudor monarchy and church. What was added to Chaucer often helped represent him favourably to Protestant England.

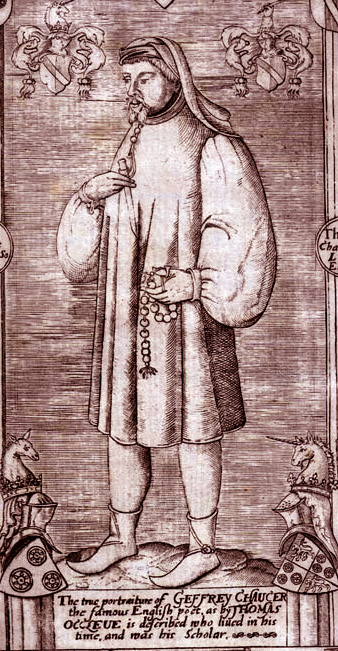
Engraving of Chaucer from Speght's edition. The two top shields display: Per pale argent and gules, a bend counterchanged (Chaucer), that at bottom left: Gules, three Catherine Wheels or (Roet, canting arms, French rouet = "spinning wheel"), and that at bottom right displays Roet quartering Argent, a chief gules overall a lion rampant double queued or (Chaucer) with crest of Chaucer above: A unicorn head

In his 1598 edition of the Works, Speght (probably taking cues from Foxe) made good use of Usk's account of his political intrigue and imprisonment in the Testament of Love to assemble a largely fictional "Life of Our Learned English Poet, Geffrey Chaucer". Speght's "Life" presents readers with an erstwhile radical in troubled times much like their own, a proto-Protestant who eventually came round to the king's views on religion. Speght states, "In the second year of Richard the second, the King tooke Geffrey Chaucer and his lands into his protection. The occasion wherof no doubt was some daunger and trouble whereinto he was fallen by favouring some rash attempt of the common people." Under the discussion of Chaucer's friends, namely John of Gaunt, Speght further explains:

Yet it seemeth that [Chaucer] was in some trouble in the daies of King Richard the second, as it may appeare in the Testament of Loue: where hee doth greatly complaine of his owne rashnesse in following the multitude, and of their hatred against him for bewraying their purpose. And in that complaint which he maketh to his empty purse, I do find a written copy, which I had of Iohn Stow (whose library hath helped many writers) wherein ten times more is adioined, then is in print. Where he maketh great lamentation for his wrongfull imprisonment, wishing death to end his daies: which in my iudgement doth greatly accord with that in the Testament of Loue. Moreouer we find it thus in Record.

Later, in "The Argument" to the Testament of Love, Speght adds:

Chaucer did compile this booke as a comfort to himselfe after great griefs conceiued for some rash attempts of the commons, with whome he had ioyned, and thereby was in feare to loose the fauour of his best friends.

Speght is the source of the famous tale of Chaucer being fined for beating a Franciscan friar in Fleet Street, and also the source of a fictitious coat of arms and family tree. Ironically, Francis Beaumont wrote an introductory apologetic letter in Speght's edition defending Chaucer's unseemly, "low", and bawdy bits from an elite, classicist position.

Francis Thynne noted some of these inconsistencies in his Animadversions, insisting that Chaucer was not a commoner, and he objected to the friar-beating story. Yet Thynne himself underscores Chaucer's support for popular religious reform, associating Chaucer's views with his father William Thynne's attempts to include The Plowman's Tale and The Pilgrim's Tale in the 1532 and 1542 Works.

Alongside Chaucer's Works, the most impressive literary monument of the period is Foxe's Acts and Monuments.... As with the Chaucer editions, it was critically significant to English Protestant identity and included Chaucer in its project. Foxe's Chaucer both derived from and contributed to the printed editions of Chaucer's Works, particularly the pseudepigrapha. Jack Upland was first printed in Foxe's Acts and Monuments, and then it appeared in Speght's edition of Chaucer's Works.

Speght's "Life of Chaucer" echoes Foxe's own account, which is itself dependent upon the earlier editions that added the Testament of Love and The Plowman's Tale to their pages. Like Speght's Chaucer, Foxe's Chaucer was also a shrewd (or lucky) political survivor. In his 1563 edition, Foxe "thought it not out of season … to couple … some mention of Geoffrey Chaucer" with a discussion of John Colet, a possible source for John Skelton's character Colin Clout.

Probably referring to the 1542 Act for the Advancement of True Religion, Foxe said that he

marvel[s] to consider … how the bishops, condemning and abolishing all manner of English books and treatises which might bring the people to any light of knowledge, did yet authorise the works of Chaucer to remain still and to be occupied; who, no doubt, saw into religion as much almost as even we do now, and uttereth in his works no less, and seemeth to be a right Wicklevian, or else there never was any. And that, all his works almost, if they be thoroughly advised, will testify (albeit done in mirth, and covertly); and especially the latter end of his third book of the Testament of Love … Wherein, except a man be altogether blind, he may espy him at the full: although in the same book (as in all others he useth to do), under shadows covertly, as under a visor, he suborneth truth in such sort, as both privily she may profit the godly-minded, and yet not be espied of the crafty adversary. And therefore the bishops, belike, taking his works but for jests and toys, in condemning other books, yet permitted his books to be read.

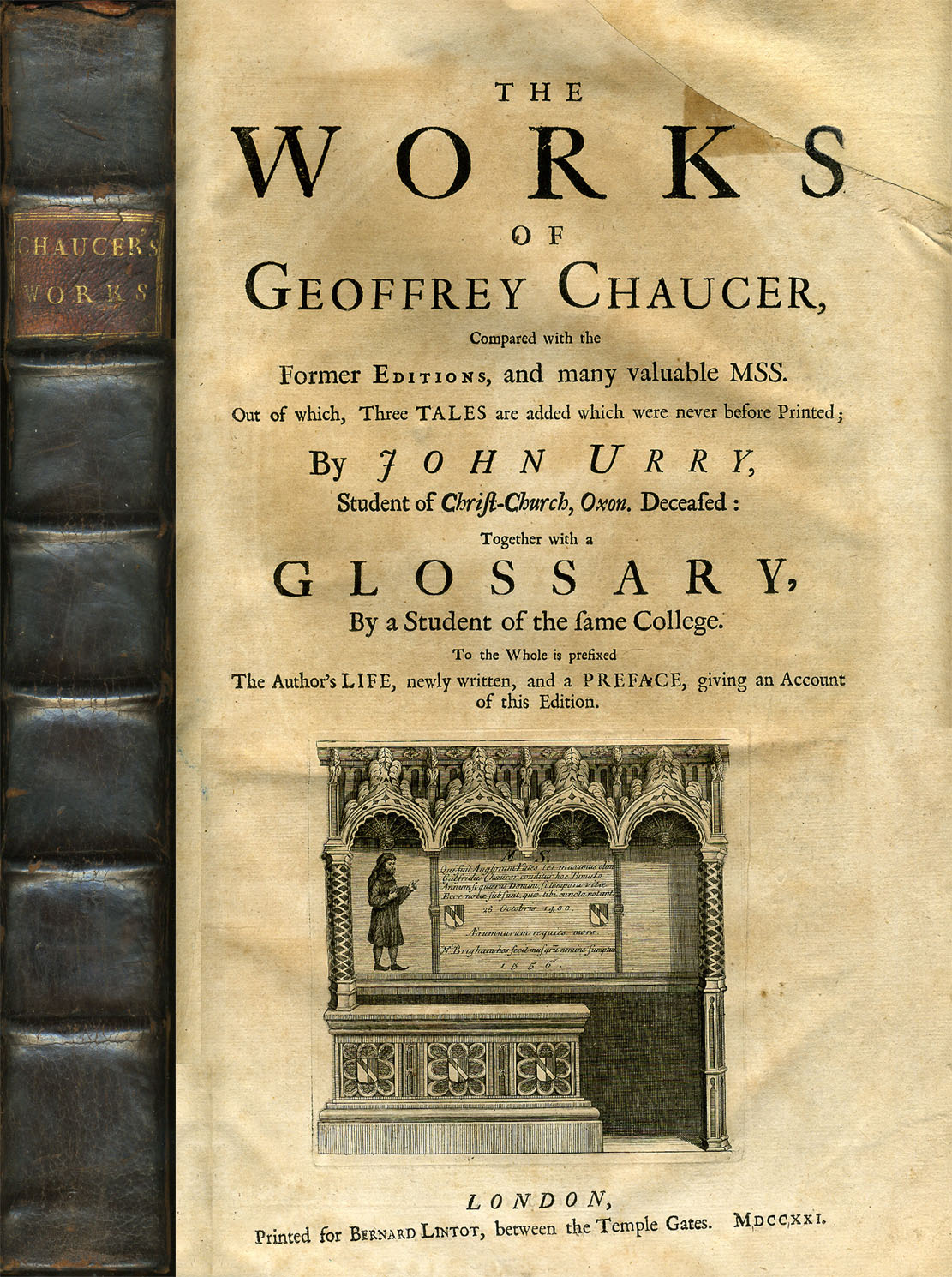
Spine and title page of John Urry's 1721 edition of Chaucer's complete works. It is the first edition of Chaucer to be entirely in Roman type.

It is significant, too, that Foxe's discussion of Chaucer leads into his history of "The Reformation of the Church of Christ in the Time of Martin Luther" when "Printing, being opened, incontinently ministered unto the church the instruments and tools of learning and knowledge; which were good books and authors, which before lay hid and unknown. The science of printing being found, immediately followed the grace of God; which stirred up good wits aptly to conceive the light of knowledge and judgment: by which light darkness began to be espied, and ignorance to be detected; truth from error, religion from superstition, to be discerned.

Foxe downplays Chaucer's bawdy and amorous writing, insisting that it all testifies to his piety. Troubling material is deemed metaphoric, while the more forthright satire (which Foxe prefers) is taken literally.

John Urry produced the first edition of the complete works of Chaucer in a Latin font, published posthumously in 1721. According to the editors, several tales were printed, and for the first time, a biography of Chaucer, a glossary of old English words, and testimonials of author writers concerning Chaucer dating back to the 16th century. According to A. S. G. Edwards,

This was the first collected edition of Chaucer to be printed in Roman type. The life of Chaucer prefixed to the volume was the work of the Reverend John Dart, corrected and revised by Timothy Thomas. The glossary appended was also mainly compiled by Thomas. The text of Urry's edition has often been criticised by subsequent editors for its frequent conjectural emendations, mainly to make it conform to his sense of Chaucer's metre. The justice of such criticisms should not obscure his achievement. His is the first edition of Chaucer in nearly a hundred and fifty years to consult any manuscripts. Additionally, it is the first since that of William Thynne in 1534 to seek systematically to assemble a substantial number of manuscripts to establish his text. It is also the first edition to offer descriptions of the manuscripts of Chaucer's works, and the first to print texts of 'Gamelyn' and 'The Tale of Beryn', works ascribed to, but not by, Chaucer.

=== Modern scholarship ===
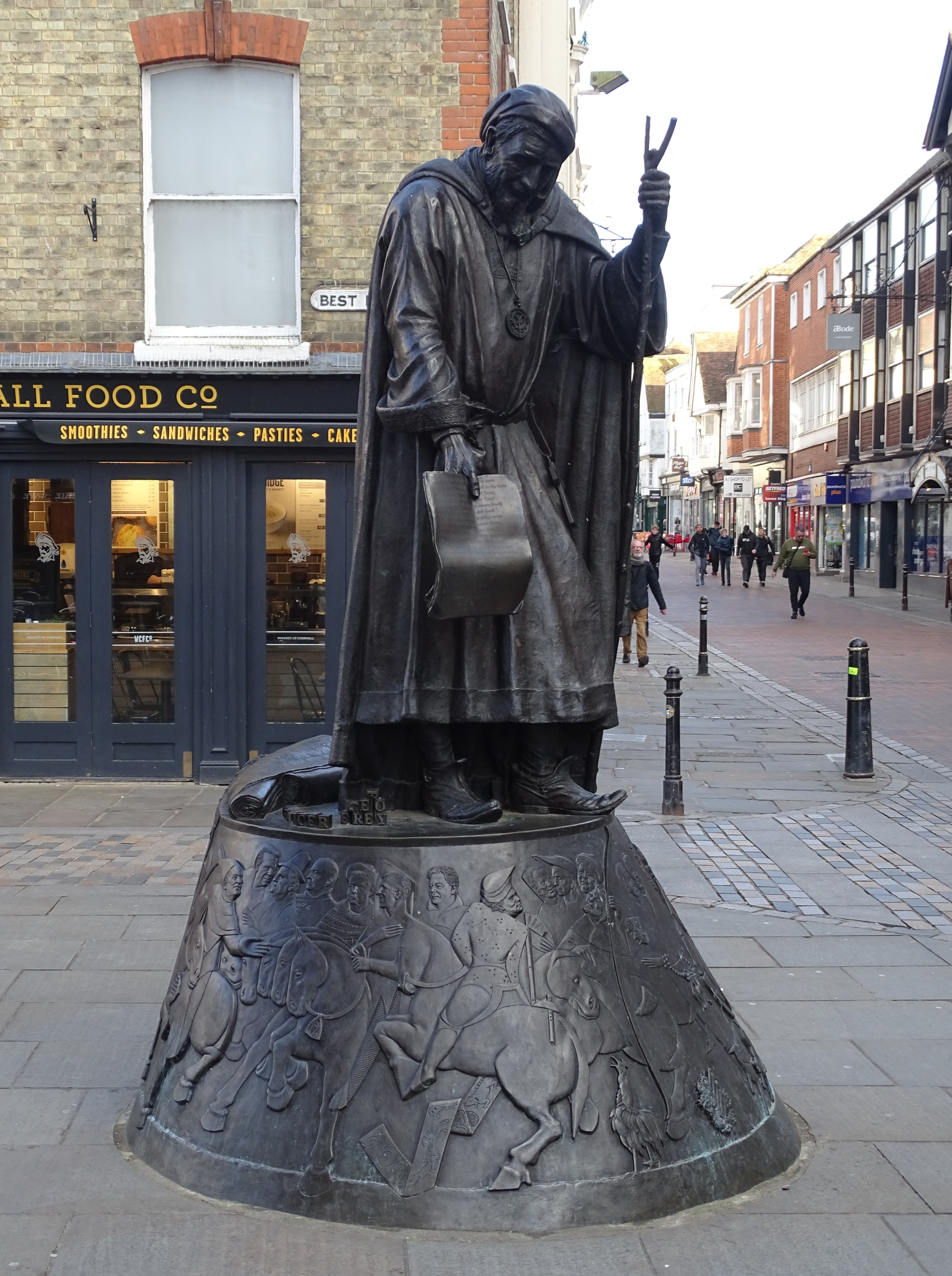
Statue of Chaucer, dressed as a Canterbury pilgrim, on the corner of Best Lane and the High Street, Canterbury

Although Chaucer's works had long been admired, serious scholarly work on his legacy did not begin until the late 18th century, when Thomas Tyrwhitt edited The Canterbury Tales, and it did not become an established academic discipline until the 19th century.

Scholars such as Frederick James Furnivall, who founded the Chaucer Society in 1868, pioneered the establishment of diplomatic editions of Chaucer's primary texts, along with careful accounts of Chaucer's language and prosody. Walter William Skeat, who, like Furnivall, was closely associated with the Oxford English Dictionary, established the base text of all of Chaucer's works with his edition, published by Oxford University Press in 1912. Later editions by John H. Fisher and Larry D. Benson offered further refinements, along with critical commentary and bibliographies.

With the textual issues largely addressed, if not resolved, attention turned to the questions of Chaucer's themes, structure, and audience. The Chaucer Research Project at the University of Chicago began in 1924. The Chaucer Review was founded in 1966 and has maintained its position as the pre-eminent journal of Chaucer studies. In 1994 the literary critic Harold Bloom placed Chaucer among the greatest Western writers of all time, and in 1997 expounded on William Shakespeare's debt to the author.

== List of works ==
The following major works are in roughly chronological order, but scholars still debate the dating of most of Chaucer's output. Works made up of a collection of stories may have been compiled over a long period.

=== Major works ===
- The Book of the Duchess
- The House of Fame
- Anelida and Arcite
- Parlement of Foules
- Troilus and Criseyde
- The Legend of Good Women
- The Canterbury Tales
- A Treatise on the Astrolabe

=== Translations ===
- Translation of Roman de la Rose, possibly extant as The Romaunt of the Rose
- Translation of Boethius' Consolation of Philosophy as Boece

=== Short poems ===
- An ABC
- Chaucers Wordes unto Adam, His Owne Scriveyn (disputed)
- The Complaint unto Pity
- The Complaint of Chaucer to his Purse
- The Complaint of Mars
- The Complaint of Venus
- A Complaint to His Lady
- The Former Age
- Fortune
- Gentilesse
- Lak of Stedfastnesse
- Lenvoy de Chaucer a Scogan
- Lenvoy de Chaucer a Bukton
- Proverbs (disputed)

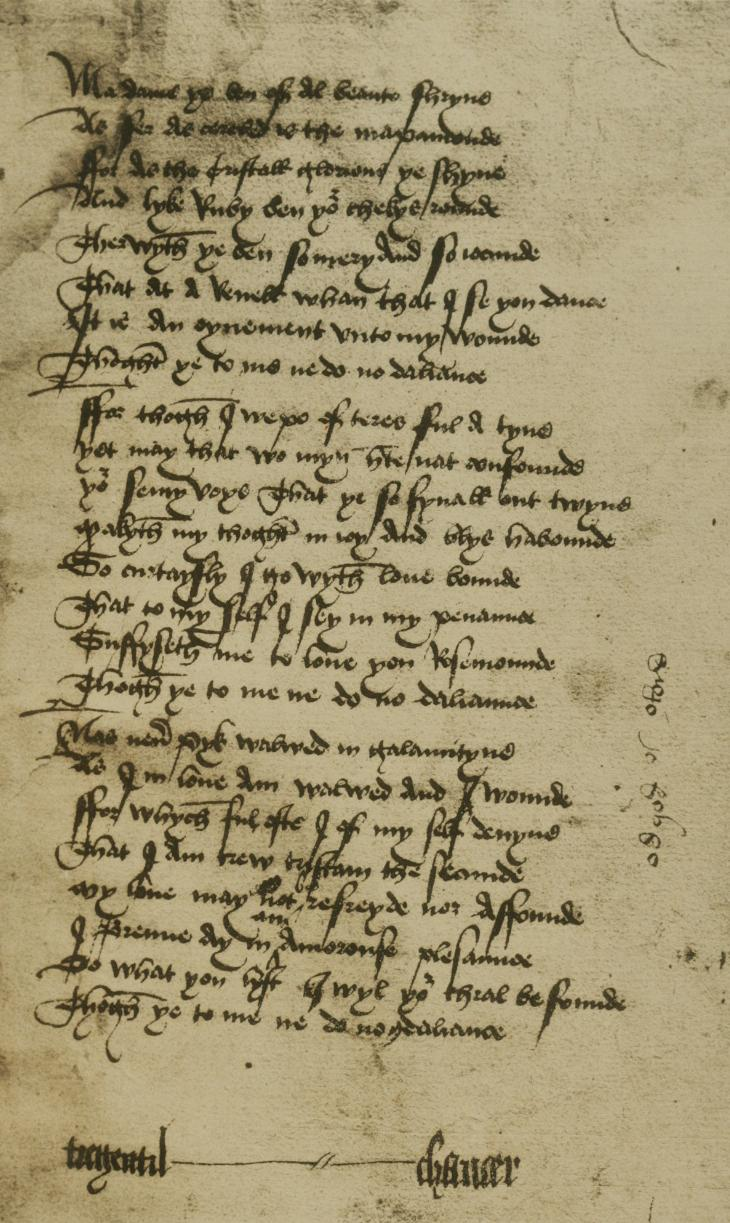
Balade to Rosemounde, 1477 print

- Balade to Rosemounde
- Truth
- Womanly Noblesse (disputed)

=== Poems of doubtful authorship ===
- Against Women Unconstant
- A Balade of Complaint
- Complaynt D'Amours
- Merciles Beaute
- The Equatorie of the Planets – A rough translation of a Latin work derived from an Arab work of the same title. It is a description of the construction and use of a planetary equatorium, which was used in calculating planetary orbits and positions (at the time, it was believed the sun orbited the Earth). The similar Treatise on the Astrolabe, not usually doubted as Chaucer's work, in addition to Chaucer's name as a gloss to the manuscript, are the main pieces of evidence for the ascription to Chaucer. However, the evidence Chaucer wrote such a work is questionable and, thus, is not included in The Riverside Chaucer. If Chaucer had not composed this work, it would have probably been written by a contemporary.

=== Works presumed lost ===
- Of the Wreched Engendrynge of Mankynde, possible translation of Innocent III's De miseria conditionis humanae
- Origenes upon the Maudeleyne
- The Book of the Leoun – "The Book of the Lion" is mentioned in Chaucer's retraction. It has been speculated that it may have been a redaction of Guillaume de Machaut's 'Dit dou lyon,' a story about courtly love (a subject about which Chaucer frequently wrote).

=== Spurious works ===
- The Pilgrim's Tale – written in the 16th century with many Chaucerian allusions
- The Plowman's Tale or The Complaint of the Ploughman – a Lollard satire later appropriated as a Protestant text
- Pierce the Ploughman's Crede – a Lollard satire later appropriated by Protestants
- The Ploughman's Tale – its body is largely a version of Thomas Hoccleve's "Item de Beata Virgine"
- "La Belle Dame Sans Merci" – frequently attributed to Chaucer, but is a translation by Richard Roos of Alain Chartier's poem
- The Testament of Love – actually by Thomas Usk
- Jack Upland – a Lollard satire
- The Floure and the Leafe – a 15th-century allegory

=== Derived works ===
- God Spede the Plough – Borrows twelve stanzas of Chaucer's Monk's Tale

== In popular culture ==
Chaucer is one of the main characters in the 2001 film A Knight's Tale, and is portrayed by Paul Bettany.

== See also ==
- Chaucer (surname)
- Poet-diplomat

== Bibliography ==
- Akbari, Suzanne Conklin; Simpson, James, eds. (2020). The Oxford handbook of Chaucer. Oxford. ISBN 978-019-9582-655.
- Benson, Larry D.; Pratt, Robert; Robinson, F. N., eds. (1987). The Riverside Chaucer (3rd ed.). Houghton-Mifflin. ISBN 978-0-395-29031-6.
- Biggs, David; McGivern, Hugh; Matthews, David; Murrie, Greg; Simpson, Dallas (1999) [1997]. Burton, T. L.; Greentree, Rosemary (eds.). Chaucer's Miller's, Reeve's, and Cook's Tales: An Annotated Bibliography 1900–1992. The Chaucer Bibliographies. Vol. 5. Toronto, Buffalo, and London: University of Toronto Press in association with the University of Rochester. doi:10.3138/9781442672895. ISBN 9781442672895. JSTOR 10.3138/j.ctt2tv0bw.
- Carlson, D. (2004). Chaucer's Jobs. Basingstoke: Macmillan. ISBN 978-1-13703-914-9.
- Crow, Martin M.; Olsen, Clair C. (1966). Chaucer: Life-Records. Oxford: Clarendon Press.
- Ferster, J. (1996). Fictions of Advice: The Literature and Politics of Counsel in Late Medieval England. Philadelphia: University of Pennsylvania Press. ISBN 978-1-51280-552-9.
- Fruoco, Jonathan (2020). Chaucer's Polyphony. The Modern in Medieval Poetry. Berlin-Kalamazoo: Medieval Institute Publications, De Gruyter. ISBN 978-1-5015-1849-2.
- Fruoco, Jonathan, ed. and transl. (2021). Le Livre de la Duchesse: oeuvres complètes (Tome I). Paris: Classiques Garnier, ISBN 978-2406119999.
- Hopper, Vincent Foster (1970). Chaucer's Canterbury Tales (Selected): An Interlinear Translation. Barron's Educational Series. ISBN 978-0-8120-0039-9.
- Hulbert, James Root (1912). Chaucer's Official Life. Collegiate Press, G. Banta Pub. Co. p. 75.
- Life-records of Chaucer. London: Published for the Chaucer Society by K. Paul, Trench, Trubner & Co., 1875–1900.
- Morley, Henry (1883). A First Sketch of English Literature. Harvard University.
- Roger, Euan; Sobecki, Sebastian (2022a). "Geoffrey Chaucer, Cecily Chaumpaigne, and the Statute of Laborers: New Records and Old Evidence Reconsidered". Chaucer Review. 57 (4): 407–437. doi:10.5325/chaucerrev.57.4.0407. S2CID 252866367.
- Skeat, W. W. (1899). The Complete Works of Geoffrey Chaucer. Oxford: Clarendon Press.
- Speirs, John (1951). Chaucer the Maker. London: Faber and Faber.
- Turner, Marion (2019). Chaucer: A European Life. Princeton: Princeton University Press.
- Ward, Adolphus W. (1907). Chaucer. Edinburgh: R. & R. Clark.
