= Piers Plowman tradition =

Works featuring one or more characters from William Langland's poem Piers Plowman

The Piers Plowman tradition is made up of about 14 different poetic and prose works from about the time of John Ball (died 1381) and the Peasants Revolt of 1381 through the reign of Elizabeth I and beyond. All the works feature one or more characters, typically Piers, from William Langland's poem Piers Plowman. (A much larger number of texts, with less obvious connection to Piers Plowman, may also be considered part of the tradition.) Because the Plowman appears in the General Prologue to The Canterbury Tales by Geoffrey Chaucer but does not have his own tale (one of seven such characters), plowman tales are sometimes used as additions to The Canterbury Tales, or otherwise conflated or associated with Chaucer.

As a rule, they satirically reflect economic, social, political, and religious grievances, and are concerned with political decisions and the relation between commoners and king. In these respects they resemble works such as Poem on the Evil Times of Edward II (1321–27), The Song of the Husbandman (c. 1340), Wynnere and Wastoure (c. 1353), and The Parlement of the Three Ages (c. 1375–1400). The Piers Plowman tradition therefore contributed to an emerging early modern "public sphere". Most of the works of the tradition are anonymous; many are pseudepigraphic by authorial design or later misattribution. The distinction between fiction and history in them is often blurred.

== 14th and 15th centuries ==
(Unless otherwise noted, dates given here refer to the year when the work was first written.)

Along with the writings of John Ball, the earliest contributions to the Piers Plowman tradition are extensively associated with the Lollards:

- Pierce the Ploughman's Crede, an anonymous, Lollard, alliterative, anticlerical, satirical poem written c. 1395 and printed in 1553 and 1561.
- The Plowman's Tale, also known as The Complaynte of the Ploughman, a Lollard poem written c. 1400 and printed by itself about 1533-1536 and again about 1548.
- The Praier and Complaynte of the Ploweman unto Christe, a Lollard prose tract and prayer for reform written about 1400, with some sources putting it as early as 1350 or as late as 1450, was printed twice, in about 1531 and 1532.
- Richard the Redeless and Mum and the Sothsegger, both written about 1405, are usually thought to be by the same author and perhaps two parts of a single work. W. W. Skeat attributed them to Langland himself.
- The Crowned King (1415)

Less directly and self-consciously evocative of Piers Plowman are:

- Jack Upland, a Lollard satire written about 1389–1396
- Responsiones ad Questiones LXV and Friar Daw's Reply, two anti-Lollard retorts to Jack Upland
- Upland's Rejoinder, a Lollard retort to Friar Daw's Reply
- I-blessyd Be Cristes Sonde, sometimes wrongly referred to as God Speed the Plough

== 16th and 17th centuries ==
(Note: Unless otherwise noted, dates given here refer to the year when the work was first printed.)

Many of the previously mentioned plowman texts, which first circulated in manuscript, reappeared later in print, often with some degree of intentional alteration and editorializing that aimed at construing them as proto-Protestant . This is true also of the first printed editions of Piers Plowman in 1550 and 1561 by Robert Crowley and Owen Rogers. William Tyndale may have (and was thought by some contemporaries) to have supplied the preface to the printed edition of the Praier and Complaynte, which aroused the critical pen of Thomas More. John Foxe did his part to canonize the same text in four editions of his famous Actes and Monuments from 1570 to 1610. Like Jack Upland, The Plowman's Tale became associated with Geoffrey Chaucer and was added by various editors to four editions of Chaucer's collected works between 1542 and 1602. I Playne Piers which Cannot Flatter, a mixture of parts of The Plowman's Tale and new material added some time after 1540, was printed in 1550 and ascribed to the author of Piers Plowman who was then unknown or identified as either Chaucer, John Wycliffe, or Robert Langland. I Playne Piers was reprinted by the Puritan Martinist writers in the Martin Marprelate Controversy in 1589. It was then retitled, O read me, for I am of great antiquitie . . . I am the Gransier of Martin Mare-prelitte.

There were also many new texts produced in the sixteenth century that may be considered parts of the Piers Plowman tradition, such as Edmund Spenser's The Shepheardes Calendar which makes use of a character named "Piers" and consciously borrows lines from The Plowman's Tale. Spenser's character, Colin Clout, who appears in two of his poems, is also a Piers-like figure derived from John Skelton. John Bale regarded Skelton as a vates pierius - poetic prophet, with pierius perhaps alluding to Piers, the pre-eminent English prophet-poet. Bale was pleased with Skelton's attacks on the clergy and his open breach of clerical celibacy. Colin Clout (1521) is one of Skelton's anti-Wolsey satires where the title character, a vagabond, complains about corrupt churchmen.

Sixteenth-century texts that refer to the poem Piers Plowman or the character "Piers Plowman" include:

- The Banckett of Iohan the Reve unto Peirs Ploughman, Laurens laborer, Thomlyn tailer and Hobb of the hille with others (British Library MS Harley 207) was written c. 1532. In it, Jacke Jolie, a Protestant, quotes reformers, including Martin Luther, on the Eucharist. A Catholic Piers defends the Roman doctrine.
- Jack of the North, an anti-enclosure dialogue written c. 1549.
- A Godly Dyalogue and Dysputacyion Betwene Pyers Plowman and a Popysh Preest concernyng the supper of the lorde (c. 1550)
- Thomas Churchyard’s The Contention...upon David Dycers Dreame (c. 1551-52)
- Possibly by Robert Crowley, Pyers Plowmans Exhortation unto the Lordes, Knightes, and Burgoysses of the Parlyamenthouse (c. 1550)
- George Gascoigne, The Fruites of Warre (1575) and The Steel Glas (1576), uses but complicates the tradition. Piers becomes an ambivalent figure capable of self-interest and vice; he is no longer a pure, idealized character. Gascoigne satirizes corrupt clergy and elites as well as the "innocent" plowman types whose complaints are motivated by the same self-interest. Rampant individualism transcends all social divisions.
- Possibly by Francis Thynne, Newes from the North Otherwise called the Conference between Simon Certain and Pierce Plowman (1579)
- Possibly by William Kempe and Edward Alleyn, A Merry Knack to Know a Knave (1594), a late Elizabethan morality play in which Piers Plowman is introduced by Honesty and complains to the king about unjust landlords. When it was performed on 11 June 1592, a riot broke out in the audience; this led to the City Council's order that all theatres be closed until September. Another play, A knack to know an honest man (1596) is probably a response; it involves shepherds and was printed by John Danter, Thomas Nashe's printer.

Less directly associated with Piers are:

- God Spede the Plough
- A Lytell Geste how the Plowman lerned his Pater Noster (c. 1510), printed by Wynkyn de Worde and in circulation as late as 1560 and 1582. In it a Catholic priest is the figure of right religion while the plowman is an avaricious ignoramus. Perhaps broad sympathy for this point of view explains why Piers Plowman was not printed until 1550.
- Of Gentylnes and Nobylyte: A dyaloge betwene the marchaunt the knyght and the plowman dysputyng who is a verey gentylman and who is a noble man and how men shuld come to auctoryte, compiled in a maner of an enterlude, or the Dialogue of the Gentleman and Plowman... (1525). This is a dramatic work that is often mistitled as the Dialogue of the Gentleman and Plowman. Its printer, John Rastell, or John Heywood may have been the author. In the dialogue, the plowman takes over and wins the debate, arguing for individual merit based on inner virtue. In the process, the plowman critically examines the bases of the wealth of the landed aristocracy.
- A Proper Dialogue Between A Gentleman and a Husbandman (1529 and 1530), mixes fourteenth and fifteenth-century Lollard texts with contemporary Protestant material.
- The Pilgrim's Tale (c. 1530s)
- John Bon and Mast Parson (1547 or 1548)
- Barnabe Googe, Eglogs, Epytaphes and Sonettes (1563)
- The Kalender of Shepardes (c. 1570), translated from the French by Robert Copland.
- A Pedlar's Tale to Queen Elizabeth (1578-90?) A play in which the main character is an itinerant laborer with prophetic, satirical analysis and advice for elites regarding social ills.
- Death and the Five Alls, an illustrated broadside depicting the plowman as the pillar of society.
- A Compendious or Briefe Examination of Certayne Ordinary Complaints, first published in 1581. Reprinted in 1583 as De Republica Anglorum: A Discourse on the Commonwealth of England. Attributed to Sir Thomas Smith as well as William Stafford and John Hales. It discusses history and economic conditions under Edward VI. Depicts a complaining farmer/husbandman in a dialogue with a doctor who tells him to rethink his old-fashioned ideas about the agricultural economy. Outlines English social hierarchy: 1) gentlemen, 2) citizens and burgesses, 3) yeomen, 4) the fourth sort of people who do not rule. Affirms orthodox opinion that it is not for the commons to discuss or influence public matters and policy; they are politically disenfranchised within a paternalistic system which is nevertheless undercut by acknowledgment of their power even as it is denied. The common yeoman is identified as distinct from the rogue; it is the yeoman who forms the basis of English society and economy. Yet he is not to be compared to gentlemen on the basis of wit, conduct or power. The Yeomen are numerous, obedient, strong, able to endure hardship, and courageous. (I.e., they make excellent, loyal, patriotic conscripts.)
- An Almanac for 1582 predicts the commons will be "factious...quarrelous, impatient, and outragious, one envying the estate and degree of another: as the poor the rich, the ploughman the gentleman."
- John Harvey, A Discorsive Problem concerning the Prophecies, How far they are to be valued, or credited, according to the surest rules, and directions in Divinitie, Philosophie, Astrologie and other learning (1588) states, "For how easily might I heer repeate almost infinite examples of villainous attempts, pernitious uprores, horrible mischeefes, slaughters, blasphemies, heresies, and all other indignities, and outrages, desperately committed, and perpetrated through means of such inveterate, and new broched forgeries. . . . neither shal I therefore neede to ransacke Pierce Plowmans satchell; nor to descant upon fortunes, newly collected out of the old Shepherds Kalendar..."
- Richard Harvey, Plaine Percevall the Peace-Maker of England (1590), an unsophisticated man of common-sense, Percevall attacks all the anti-Martinists but purports to settle the controversy.
- Edmund Spenser's The Faerie Queene, books 1-3 (1590) In the first book, the Redcross knight's origins are rich with multiple meanings: as a national symbol, he is St. George, England's patron saint, and Spenser stresses the humble, agricultural origins of the name George (Georgos is Greek for "farmer"). On a more individualized level, Redcrosse represents a radical social mobility, going from the plow to the queen's court. Spenser is no doubt expressing a kind of personal allegory that would resonate with other ambitious men with humble origins, but such mobility also threatens the agrarian order by eroding the fixity of the social hierarchy upheld by the earlier, conservative agrarian complaints:

Thence she thee brought into this faerie Lond,

And in an heaped furrow did thee hyde, Where thee a Ploughman all unweeting fond, As he his toylsome teme that way did guyde, And brought thee up in ploughmans state to byde, Whereof Georgos he thee gave to name; Till prickt with courage, and thy forces pryde, To Faery court thou cam'st to seeke for fame,

And prove thy puissant armes, as seemes thee best became.

- Robert Greene, A Quip for an Upstart Courtier (1592), the basis for a lost play performed by The Chamberlain's Men, Clothbreeches and Velvethose (1600).
- Thomas Nashe, Pierce Pennilesse His Supplication to the Devil (1592)
- Gabriel Harvey, Pierce's Supererogation (1593), a response to Nashe's attacks on Harvey and his brothers.
- Robert Wilson The Cobler's Prophecy (1594), a play.
- Pedler's Prophecie (1595), a play.
- Henry Chettle, Piers Plainnes seaven yeres Prentiship In Arcadia, a picaro Piers talks about his life (much of it spent in London) to Arcadian shepherds in Tempe. He has served as an apprentice under seven bad masters (an occasion for another taxonomy of London life and vices). Giving up on the court as an exception to general corruption, Chettle's Piers follows the precedent from Virgil to Wyatt and Spenser: satisfaction will only be found in pastoral retirement. Like much other late Elizabethan prose, John Lyly's Euphues is an obvious source of inspiration. The influence of other masterpieces of rogue literature is apparent, especially Thomas Nashe's Pierce Pennilesse and The Unfortunate Traveller.

Like Thomas More and Robert Crowley, Bishop Hugh Latimer valued "commune wealth" more than "private commodity." He was an outspoken critic of enclosure, the abuses of landlords, and the aristocrats who lined their pockets through the Dissolution of the Monasteries. Like Crowley, Latimer was able to be especially outspoken when Edward Seymour, 1st Duke of Somerset had controlling influence in the court as Lord Protector of England during part of the minority of Edward VI. A famous sermon of Latimer's that represented preachers as God's plowmen, "The Sermon of the Plowers," was delivered at St. Paul's Cross, 18 January 1548 and was printed that year by John Day. This was the last of four "Sermons on the Plough;" unfortunately the first three are lost. While Latimer's message is spiritual, it has a sharp political edge that also acknowledges the material concerns of people affected by enclosure. Latimer attacks idle clergy as "plowmen" who cause a spiritual famine, and enclosure is used as a metaphor for hindrances to proper preaching. The devil is called the busiest bishop and greatest plowman in England; he is seeding the land with the ritual and ornamental trappings of popery. Latimer himself, through the style of his sermons, typifies the plain, homely and direct speech of Piers and popular Protestantism. Anthony Anderson's The Shield of our Safetie (1581) uses Latimer's figure of the pastor as a plowman but is unwilling to ascribe special virtue to the commons and rural laborers. Godliness is lacking "from top to toe" in England, "from the Nobilitie, to the Plowman and his mate." George Gifford's A Briefe Discourse of Certaine Points of the Religion which is among the Common Sort of Christians (1583) asserts that "it is not for plowmen to meddle with scriptures."

== Trends and influences ==
The early modern dissemination and reception of Visio Willelmi de Petro Ploughman ("William's Vision of Piers Plowman") from the fourteenth to the sixteenth century reveals a great deal about changes in English society and politics. Clearly orthodox Roman Catholic in doctrine but reformist in that it posed social criticism and advocated moral, economic, and political change, the original poem(s)--and the figure of Piers in the popular imagination—were often viewed quite differently.

Piers was open to being appropriated by Lollards and later Protestant reformers. William Tyndale's memorable statement to a "popish priest," recorded in John Foxe' Acts and Monuments, is an echo of Erasmus' Paraclesis, which also resonated with popular images of the pious plowman: "If God spare my life ere many years, I will cause a boy that driveth the plow shall know more of the scripture than thou dost." After nearly two centuries, the plowman tradition of social complaint and satire became more worldly-wise and less ardently idealistic. It became, increasingly, a secular vehicle for complaining about class rivalries and political dissent—and also for containing or restraining such things. What is notable about the Piers/plowman literature of the Elizabethan era is the general absence of the old religious radical who speaks the plain truth for the poor, godly commons against corrupt elites and hypocritical English clergy. In many cases the name of Piers remained, but his vocation was altered; with few exceptions, he was no longer specifically a religious reformer. Criticism of the wealthy and powerful continued, but rather than directly addressing complaints to them and to the monarch and parliament as Edwardians like Crowley, Latimer and Thomas Lever had done, they became the subject of comic, often satiric, popular entertainment. Plays and pamphlets became the vehicle of social analysis, concerned with class identities and rivalries that were rendered with greater complexity and detail than in found in the earlier literature.

After the Elizabethan Religious Settlement, the Piers tradition changed, particularly after censorship laws put into effect in 1551, 1553, and 1559, officially banned discussion of religious matters or matters of state. Other causes were also at work. With the division and collapse of Christendom in the Reformation, the medieval conception of the social hierarchy, as well as Purgatory and Hell, so central to Langland's poem, were vestigial remnants of a passing order. In the Elizabethan era, Piers' Christological aspect became fully detached from his role as the universal commoner, a secular economic man among economic men with clashing interests. At the same time, there was a bifurcation of the original carnivalesque world of Langland's Piers that had common, aristocratic, and divine characters. The moral and apocalyptic aspects of Piers flourished briefly at mid-century but then dissipated along with the idealism of the Edwardian reformers and their vision of a united commonwealth of interdependent estates. Popular literature evoking Piers by name or in spirit began to construe elites as people with whom one may compete and win. Langland's "fair field of folk" became a socioeconomic playing field on which elites are perhaps no less important to the nation than the common people. In this way Langland's Piers and Piers-like figures helped establish an English national identity based on and for the popular rather than the elite culture. This popular self-understanding seems to have flourished especially in the nonconformist Puritan mind where it could be radicalized. In other cases, it could be a basis for statist nationalism

According to the Privy Council, military conscription, which was at a high in the late sixteenth century, gave "great ease and good to the country to be ridd of those kinde of people whoe otherwyse wil be a burthen to the country." Such attempts to channel and appropriate the power of the commoners did not escape their notice. In Pierce Pennilesse, Thomas Nashe wrote, "If they have no service abroad, they will make mutinies at home..." Popular awareness of such strategies to channel the power of the commons toward royal interests did not generate resistance, but offered a chance for the commons to insert their own interests into the transaction. Perhaps this is why in the Elizabethan era, Piers and Piers-like figures began to appear as itinerant laborers and tradesmen: tinkers, cobblers and shoemakers who claimed to represent true Englishness over against effete, pretentious elites. While affirming their loyalty, these humble figures labored to define an English identity from below that was drawn from native, popular traditions going back to Langland and Chaucer. To the extent that the popular opposition between plain and ornate, honest and dissembling was associated with courtiers, (South European) foreignness and Catholicism, the plowman tradition continued to be anti-Catholic and staunchly Protestant.

This popular image of the English commonwealth is often defined in the Elizabethan era in opposition to Catholic nations and "Rome," which are represented as less free and unvirtuous. Hutchins notes that "Even in the most unremittingly absolutist interpretations of Tudor theories of rule, the qualities that Elizabethans claim make a good ruler include dignified concern for the common people" (229). Popular plowman literature constantly reasserts this view: English society is based on its regard for its foundation in the commons. As a sturdy working-class fellow in the popular culture, it is not surprising that Piers never made it into the works of the elite writers who predominate in the English literary canon. Moreover, Piers was even more archaic and parochial than Chaucer, with the added notoriety of political subversiveness and (now illegal) prophecy. University educated, aspiring courtier-writers with poorer, often rural, backgrounds (e.g., Spenser and Harvey) may have been uneasy with a tradition that sometimes cast a cold eye on the lives and ambitions of upwardly mobile urbanites like themselves. In Nashe we find a new Piers, Pierce Pennilesse, who represents the young London malcontent writer who desires but lacks patronage and recognition of his talent. While this literature is far removed from the straightforward religious and political criticisms of Crowley and others, writers like Nashe and Greene were still finding ways to use the old moral-satirical tradition to expose and attack—or just laugh at—vices directly related to contemporary social and political conditions.

== Sources ==
- Aston, Margaret, Lollards and Reformers: Images and Literacy in Late Medieval Religion. London: Hambledon Press, 2003.
- Barr, Helen., ed. The Piers Plowman Tradition. London: Everyman's Library, 1993.
- Dean, James M. "Plowman Writings: Introduction", in Medieval English Political Writings, Kalamazoo, Michigan: Medieval Institute Publications, 1996 – covers Song of the Husbandman, God Spede the Plough, I-blessyd Be Cristes Sonde, and Chaucer's Plowman
- DiMarco, Vincent, Piers Plowman: A Reference Guide Boston: G. K. Hall, 1982.
- Hudson, Anne, "Epilogue: The Legacy of 'Piers Plowman'", in A Companion to Piers Plowman, ed. John A. Alford. Berkeley: University of California Press, 1988. 251–66.
- Rydzeski, Justine, 'Radical Nostalgia in the Age of Piers Plowman: Economics, Apocalypticism, and Discontent' in Studies in the Humanities: Literature-Politics-Society vol 48 Peter Lang, 1999
- Tawney, R. H. Religion and the Rise of Capitalism (1926)
- Tawney, R. H. and Eileen Power, eds. Tudor Economic Documents: Being Select Documents Illustrating the Economic and Social History of Tudor England 3 vols. (1924)
