= The Pilgrim's Tale =

English anti-monastic poem

The Pilgrim's Tale is an English anti-monastic poem. It was probably written c. 1536–38, since it makes references to events in 1534 and 1536 – e.g. the Lincolnshire Rebellion – and borrows from The Plowman's Tale and the 1532 text by William Thynne of Chaucer's Romaunt of the Rose, which is cited by page and line. It remains the most mysterious of the pseudo-Chaucerian texts. In his 1602 edition of the Works of Chaucer, Thomas Speght mentions that he hoped to find this elusive text. A prefatory advertisement to the reader in the 1687 edition of the Works speaks of an exhaustive search for The Pilgrim's Tale, which had proved fruitless

== Background ==
It has been suggested that The Pilgrim's Tale was created as part of a Henrician propaganda campaign, or that it was politically subversive and suppressed as part of Henry VIII's ban on prophecies. (They were deemed felonies without recourse to benefit of clergy. This law was repealed when Edward VI came to power in 1547, but it was reinstated three years later in 1550. The rule was repealed under Mary I and revived in new form by Elizabeth I.) The Pilgrim's Tale both performs and denounces prophesying. After using Isaiah as a prophetic, anticlerical authority, the author of PilgT warns of false prophecies from the devil and rebels such as Nicholas Melton, a leader in the Lincolnshire rebellion of 1536, Perkin Warbeck (1474–1499), a pretender to the crown hanged by Henry VII, and Jack Straw, a leader in the Great Rising of 1381. Later, however, the author exempts Merlin and Bede, since they can be mustered up as anti-Roman Catholic prophets.

== Survival ==
A fragment of The Pilgrim's Tale exists only within The Courte of Venus, which is significant as the first printed anthology of coterie poems. The Courte of Venus itself exists in only three printed fragments whose identities and origins are elusive. It was first printed sometime between 1535 and 1539, probably by Thomas Gybson/Gibson. It was partially reprinted between 1547 and 1549, probably by William Copland as A Boke of Ballettes. It was printed again, probably by Thomas Marshe, in the early 1560s. Marshe's edition uniquely draws upon another source text independent of the other two known printed editions.

No surviving version of The Pilgrim's Tale names its author, but it says its author was an Oxonian, as Chaucer incorrectly claimed to have been in the paratext of the 1602 Speght edition, and it contains numerous references to Chaucer's works. A "comely priest" joins the narrator in criticism of the church, recommending that he read some anticlerical and prognosticatory lines in Chaucer's Romance of the Rose (Benson ed., 7165ff.), which are quoted. The Pilgrim's Tale also alludes to The Wife of Bath's Tale and Arthurian legend in describing a monk whose "mumbling of his holy thinges" banished the faeries and the queen elf but brought in seven worse spirits. Some see in the tale's characterisation of Christ – "and first he dyd yt, and after he taght" – an allusion to Piers Plowman.

== Attribution ==
John Bale attributed The Courte of Venus and The Pilgrim's Tale to Chaucer in his Illustriam maioris scriptores...summarium, noting that he saw a quarto edition of The Courte of Venus that included The Pilgrim's Tale, probably Gibson's printed edition of c. 1536–1540. However, Bale changed the ascription of authorship for Curiam Veneris (his Latin name for The Courte of Venus) to Robert Shyngleton/Singleton ("Robertus Shyngleton, astrorum et theologie peritus, sacerdos, composuit") in his notes in Index Britanniae scriptorum, although his later, 1559 edition of the Illustriam kept it as Chaucer's. It is possible that Shyngleton was the compiler of The Courte of Venus and probably the author of its Prologue (in the Douce fragment) as well as The Pilgrim's Tale. Little is known about Shyngleton, except that he was an Oxford-educated Roman Catholic divine, who may not have graduated. He may have become a Protestant; he was for a time a chaplain to Anne Boleyn, who was sympathetic to the English Protestants. He was tried for treasonable utterances in 1543 and hanged in 1544 with Germain Gardiner and John Larke, an event recorded in John Foxe's Actes and Monuments. Bale recorded that Shyngleton was said to have written a Treatise of the Seven Churches; Of the Holy Ghost; Comment on Certain Prophecies; and Theory of the Earth, which was dedicated to Henry VII and has elsewhere been called Of the Seven Ages of the World. None of these texts exist in print, but Bale wrote that Gibson printed "Shyngleton's De VII Ecclesiis and De Spiritu."

Thomas Wyatt the Elder was also suggested as the author of The Pilgrim's Tale in the sixteenth century, and five of the poems in The Courte of Venus are definitely his. Francis Thynne, adamant that The Pilgrim's Tale is Chaucer's, denied the Wyatt attribution in his Animadversions upon the Annotations and Corrections of Some Imperfections of Impressions of Chaucer's Works... and claimed that his father, William Thynne, prepared a printed version of Chaucer's works including The Pilgrim's Tale, but Henry VIII would not extend his protection to it because of the reaction he expected it would elicit from the bishops. There is no other record of this Thynne edition; some scholars believe it never existed.

Others have speculated that some real Chaucerian poems may have been included in some versions of The Courte of Venus, but those that have survived are not Chaucer's, except perhaps the Prologue, but this is only a remote possibility. Russell Fraser speculates the following: "About the time of Anne Boleyn's fall in 1536, and concurrent with the Lincolnshire rebellion, Sir Thomas Wyatt recast a number of his poems. Wyatt's revisions were secured by Thomas Gybson, and printed soon afterwards as The Court of Venus in a volume with The Pilgrim's Tale. But the Tale was obnoxious to the clergy, and finally to the Crown, and in the suppression of the volume, which probably followed speedily after publication, the Court, because of its unlucky association with the Tale, was also suppressed" (45).

== See also ==
- Piers Plowman tradition
