= The Praier and Complaynte of the Ploweman unto Christe =

Polemical tract published around 1531

The Praier and Complaynte of the Ploweman unto Christe: written not longe after the yere of our Lorde. M. and three hundred is a short (14 pages), anonymous English Christian text, probably written in the late fourteenth or early fifteenth century and first printed in about 1531. It consists of a prose tract, in the form of a polemical prayer, expressing Lollard sentiments and arguing for religious reform. In it, the simple ploughman/narrator speaks on behalf of "the repressed common man imbued with the simple truths of the Bible and a knowledge of the commandments against the mighty and monolithic conservative church". The pastoral-ecclesiastical metaphor of shepherds and sheep is used extensively as a number of criticisms are made about such things as confession, indulgences, purgatory, tithing and celibacy. The Prayer became important in the sixteenth century, when its themes were taken up by proponents of the Protestant Reformation.

== History of the Prayer ==
The Prayer was probably written as a manuscript in the late fourteenth or early fifteenth century, but no manuscript copies survive.

It was first printed by a Protestant printer, Martinus de Keyser, in Antwerp, in about 1531, and then in London, by another Protestant printer, Thomas Godfray, in about 1532, although Godfray's name does not appear in the edition. A preface in both editions, "To the Reader", dates itself 28 February 1531 and claims (undoubtedly in error) that the Prayer was written "not longe after the yere of our Lorde A thousand and thre hundred."

John Bale included the Prayer, under the curious Latin title of Agricolae Praecatione in his bibliographic work, Scriptorum Illustrium maioris Brytannie . . . Catalogus (Basel, 1557–59).

John Foxe included the text of the Prayer (identifying Tyndale as its editor) in his second (1570) edition of Acts and Monuments, but it was deleted in the third (1576) edition, and reinstated in the fourth (1583) and subsequent editions. Foxe's 1570 introduction dates the Prayer to the mid-fourteenth century and claims not to have changed any of it since the antique language gives "credit" to it and its "testimony." Marginal notes explicate the most difficult words as well as the points that square with Protestant attacks on Roman Catholicism.

An edition was edited and reprinted by the University of Toronto Press in 1997.

== Author of the Prayer ==
In 1662, Thomas Fuller attributed the Prayer to "Robert Langland," then supposed by Robert Crowley and Bale to be the author of Piers Plowman, a poem whose author is now usually identified as William Langland). Fuller was familiar with Piers Plowman and with several separate editions of the Prayer, which he believed were printed by Tyndale and Foxe.

The preface to the published edition is signed "W.T.". Parker and others take this to mean that William Tyndale wrote it; Anthea Hume disagrees and suggests George Joye as the writer. Godfrey may indeed have printed the Prayer by or with the approval of Tyndale (as John Foxe indicates) ca.1532-6 in London or in 1531 in Antwerp. Tyndale could have been involved with the first edition, since he is known to have been in Antwerp that year, and Godfrey had printing connections with Tyndale and Antwerp.

== Controversial content ==
The Prayer was highly controversial, owing to its questioning of some of the tenets of the Roman Catholic Church. Thomas More (1478–1535) was probably referring to the Prayer when he attacked the "Ploughmans Prayour" in his preface to his Confutation of Tyndale's Answer (published in 1532 by More's nephew, William Rastell). In 1546, the Prayer was among the books banned by name in England, according to Robert Steele, along with all the works of John Frith, William Tyndale, John Wycliffe, John Bale, Robert Barnes, Miles Coverdale, and others.

The preface to the printed version (by "W.T.") underlines some of the controversial content, for example comparing the Protestant reformers to Christ. Both were attacked as "innovators" when, according to the preface, they were only teaching the true and ancient doctrines. In this way, the Prayer is mustered up as an old proto-Protestant English text showing the truth and putatively traditional basis of Protestant teachings. The text of the Prayer echoes other reformist texts, such as Rede Me and Be Nott Wrothe.

W.T., in his preface, also argues that those in positions of wealth and power are corrupted by self-interest, and only the poor commons can see the truth of scripture. Some of these criticisms are directed toward the king and other rulers; W.T. does explicitly denounce the murder of Archbishop John Fisher, whom the king had executed 1535 for refusing the Oath of Supremacy. Helen White contends that the Prayer contains a "very radical theory of the nature of property".

== See also ==
- Piers Plowman Tradition
- Plowboy trope
