= Skeat =

Skeat or Skeats is a common English family name. The names Skeat, Skeats, Skeates, Skett, Skitt and Skates are derived from the forename Scet or Schett, which is mentioned in Domesday Book.

== History ==
Skeat was originally a given name derived from the Old Norse skjótr, meaning "swift" or "fleet". Ricardus filius (son of) Schet 1166 is mentioned in the Pipe Rolls of Henry II in Norfolk. It is mentioned as a surname in the 1201 Pipe Rolls in Shropshire and in the 1275 Hundred Rolls in Norfolk again. Robert Skeet is mentioned in the Subsidy Rolls of Suffolk for 1327.

== People surnamed Skeat or Skeats ==
- Bob Skeat, bass guitarist in Wishbone Ash
- Ethel Skeat (1865–1939), English paleontologist
- Ernest Willington Skeats (1875–1953), geologist
- Francis Skeat (1909–2000), English glass painter
- Len Skeat, jazz double-bassist
- Theodore Cressy Skeat (1907–2003), paleographer
- Walter William Skeat (1835–1912), philologist and etymologist
- Walter William Skeat (anthropologist) (1866–1953), anthropologist
