= The Simonie =

Middle English poem

The Simonie, also known as Symonie and Couetise, is a Middle English poem on the evil times of the reign of King Edward II.

== Dated to between 1321 and 1330 ==
The poem survives in three versions, probably composed and modified over a century by anonymous authors. The original poem, perhaps not exactly reproduced by any of the surviving texts, has been dated to 1321 by Thomas Wright (1839), to 1327 by J. Aberth (2000), and to 1322–30 by Dan Embree and Elizabeth Urquhart (1991).

== Surviving versions ==
Version A is in Edinburgh, National Library of Scotland, MS Advocates 19.2.1. It is 476 lines long, breaking off in mid-stanza. It can be dated to the 1320s or the 1330s.

Version B is in Oxford, Bodleian Library, MS Bodley 48. It is 413 lines long, but 216 lines have been cut from the manuscript. It can be dated to the 1320s.

Version C is in Cambridge, Peterhouse MS 104. It is 468 lines long, apparently complete. It might be dated to any point up to the date of the manuscript itself—1375–1425.

The three versions vary radically from one another—much more extensively than is usual for a text that has been merely copied and much more chaotically than is plausible for a text revised by its author. Each version has unique inclusions and omissions; only 35 percent of the lines in A are shared by B and C.

== Protests in the aftermath of the Great Famine of 1315–1317 ==
It was a "social protest" poem that arose in the aftermath of the Great Famine of 1315–1317. It clearly targeted the negligences and vices of specific social groups, such as the clergy and nobility, within the context of the failures of the Great Famine and wars of the early 14th century. The tradition of social protest poems in England would later culminate with Piers Plowman – see Piers Plowman tradition for further discussion.

== See also ==
- Pierce the Ploughman's Crede
- Lollards
