= The Plowman's Tale =

Pseudo-Chaucerian text

There are two pseudo-Chaucerian texts called "The Plowman's Tale".

In the mid-15th century a rhyme royal "Plowman's Tale" was added to the text of The Canterbury Tales in the Christ Church MS. This tale is actually an orthodox Roman Catholic, possibly anti-Lollard version of a Marian miracle story written by Thomas Hoccleve called Item de Beata Virgine. Someone composed and added a prologue to fit Hoccleve's poem into Chaucer's narrative frame. This tale did not survive into the printed editions of Chaucer's Works.

The better-known "Plowman's Tale" was included in printed editions of Chaucer's Works. It is a decidedly Wycliffite anti-fraternal tale that was written ca. 1400 and circulated among the Lollards. Sometimes titled The Complaynte of the Plowman, it is 1380 lines long, composed of eight-line stanzas (rhyme scheme ABABBCBC with some variations suggesting interpolation) like Chaucer's "Monk's Tale". There is no clear internal/design connection in "The Plowman's Tale" with Chaucer's Canterbury Tales or Piers Plowman. Anthony Wotton, who was probably the editor of the 1606 edition of "The Plowman's Tale", suggested that "The Plowman's Tale" makes a reference to Jack Upland or, more likely, Pierce the Ploughman's Crede, since the main character in "The Plowman's Tale" says: "Of Freres I haue told before / In a making of a Crede..." (1065–66). The Plowman's Tale also borrows heavily from the Crede.

Some sections of "The Plowman's Tale", such as the prologue, were added in the 16th century to make it fit better as one of Chaucer's tales. The prologue announces that a sermon is to follow in the tale. Instead, a traveller with none of the characteristics of Chaucer's plowman (or any literary plowman of the era) overhears a Pelican and a Griffin debating about the clergy. Most of the lines are the Pelican's, who attacks the typical offences in an evangelical manner, discusses Antichrist, and appeals to the secular government to humble the church. The Pelican is driven off by force but is then vindicated by a Phoenix. The tale ends with a disclaimer wherein the author distinguishes his own views from those of the Pelican, stating that he will accept what the church requires.

The association of this and other texts with Chaucer was possible because Chaucer's "General Prologue" to The Canterbury Tales introduces a Plowman who never receives a tale. This omission seems to have sparked the creativity of others from an early date. In the "General Prologue", the Host jokes about the Plowman's brother, who is the Parson. In some surviving manuscripts the Host suggests that the Parson is a "Lollere". As early as 1400, Chaucer's courtly audience grew to include members of the rising literate, middle-/merchant class, which included many Lollard sympathisers who would have been inclined to believe in a Lollard Chaucer.

== Printed editions and their interpretation ==
The sole surviving manuscript of "The Plowman's Tale" (written in a 16th-century hand) was inserted at the end of The Canterbury Tales in a copy of Thomas Godfrey/Godfray's 1532 printed edition of Chaucer's Works (STC 5068), edited by William Thynne. (This is in PR 1850 1532 cop. 1 at the University of Texas Harry Ransom Center.) According to Thomas Speght, John Stow had a manuscript copy that is now lost. William Thynne's son, Francis Thynne, wrote in his Animadversions that "The Plowman's Tale" was not printed along with the other tales in 1532 because of suppression started by Cardinal Thomas Wolsey (ca. 1475–1529/30). However, Francis Thynne's views are often discounted, largely because he was only an infant when his father was working on his Chaucer editions.

Some scholars have argued that The Plowman's Tale was part of a Henrician propaganda effort. Godfrey was probably working with the King's Printer, Thomas Berthelet, and he was protected by Thomas Cromwell (c. 1485–1540), earl of Essex, who was responsible for the Dissolution of the Monasteries (1536–39). But "The Plowman's Tale" could also be used as criticism against the king, since the Pelican marvels at the ignorance of parliament and of the lords and the king concerning the plight of the commons. In the mildest interpretation, "The Plowman's Tale" makes a bid for the necessity and appropriateness of heeding the concerns of the commons.

"The Plowman's Tale" was successfully printed on its own in an octavo edition by Godfray ca. 1533–36 (STC 5099.5). In 1542, Tyndale's New Testament and other vernacular books were banned – essentially everything printed in English before 1540 – with the exception of "Canterburye tales, Chaucers bokes, Gowers bokes and stories of mennes lieves" according to a royal statute, the Act for the Advancement of True Religion. "The Plowman's Tale" was printed again as a duodecimo volume in London by William Hyll ca. 1548 (STC 5100) as "The Plouumans tale compylled by syr Geffray Chaucher knyght." In the year of the ban it was printed in Thynne's second (1542) edition of Chaucer's Works, under the imprints of William Bonham (STC 5069) and John Reynes (STC 5070).

After 1542, "The Plowman's Tale" appeared in new and reprinted editions of Chaucer's Works based on Thynne's text for some two centuries, during which the Chaucer canon and order of the Canterbury Tales was quite fluid. Thomas Tyrwhitt finally excluded "The Plowman's Tale" from his 1775 edition of the poet's work.

== Associated with Chaucer and Piers Plowman from 1500 to 1700 ==
The king's antiquary (under Henry VIII), John Leland (c. 1506–52), seems to have confused Piers Plowman and "The Plowman's Tale", referring to Petri Aratoris Fabula (Peter/Piers Plowman's Tale) as a Canterbury tale. John Bale similarly included Arator Narratio (Plowman's Tale) in his list of the Canterbury Tales in his Scriptorum Illustrium Maioris Brytanniae . . . Catalogus (Basle, 1557, 1559). Corroborating Francis Thynne, Leland's remarks on The Plowman's Tale are as follows: "But the tale of Piers Plowman, which by the common consent of the learned is attributed to Chaucer as its true author, has been suppressed in each edition, because it vigorously inveighed against the bad morals of the priests" (Commentarii de Scriptoribus Britannicis ed. Anthony Hall. Like Bale's Chaucer, Leland's Chaucer is a reformer and follower of Wycliffe.

John Foxe praised "The Plowman's Tale" in his first (1563) and second (1570) editions of the immensely influential Acts and Monuments. Foxe implies that Chaucer was a proto-Protestant Lollard and assumes he was the author of "The Plowman's Tale". (The Testament of Love and Jack Upland are also mentioned.) The Plowman's Tal was again printed by itself in 1606 by Anthony Wotton. The full title of Wotton's edition reads: "The Plough-mans Tale. Shewing by the doctrine and liues of the Romish Clergie, that the pope is AntiChrist and they his Ministers. Written by Sir Geffrey Chaucer, Knight, amongst his Canterburie tales: and now set out apart from the rest, with a short exposition of the words and matters, for the capacitie and understanding of the simpler sort of Readers."

Edmund Spenser's The Shepheardes Calender (1579) makes references to and borrows from The Plowman's Tale (attributing it to Chaucer), possibly Pierce the Plowman's Crede, and, more obscurely, perhaps to Piers Plowman. Gabriel Harvey's copy of the Speght 1598 edition of Chaucer's Works (BL Additional 42518) summarises The Plowman's Tale with the note "Ecclesiastical abuses."

Sir William Vaughan's Golden Fleece (1626) presents Chaucer as Wycliffe's master and the author of The Plowman's Tale, which is used to give lines to Duns Scotus and Chaucer in a debate between them that centres on the Pope (Is he Antichrist?) just as in the 1606 Wotton edition. This work promotes the colony at Newfoundland over against the vices of contemporary England. Famous historical figures, including Chaucer and Scotus, are brought to the court of Apollo to discuss English society. Apollo ultimately proclaims that all the problems that are exposed will be cured by the Golden Fleece, which is in Newfoundland.

Other seventeenth-century citations of The Plowman's Tale are: Anthony Wotton's A Defense of Mr. Perkins Booke, Called a Reformed Catholike (1606), Simon Birkbeck's The Protestant's Evidence Taken Ovt of Good Records (1635), John Favour's Antiquitie Trivmphing Over Noveltie (1619), and John Milton's Of Reformation (1641) and An Apology Against a Pamphlet (1642).

John Dryden remarks in Fables Ancient and Modern (1700) that Chaucer had "some little Byas toward the Opinions of Wycliff . . . somewhat of which appears in the Tale of Piers Plowman [an interesting conflation of Langland and pseudo-Chaucer]: Yet I cannot blame him for inveighing so sharply against the Vices of the Clergy of his Age: Their Pride, their Ambition, their Pomp, their Avarice, their Worldly Interest, deserv'd the lashes which he gave them, both in that, and in most of his Canterbury Tales." The phrase "inveighed . . . against the clergy" is possibly derived from Leland; similar synopses appear in the editions of Chaucer's Works starting with Thynne. Another eighteenth-century commentator, John Dart, rejected The Plowman's Tale as Chaucer's but still agreed that Chaucer "bitterly inveighs against the Priests and Fryars", although he "expresses his regard for the secular clergy who lived up to their profession".

== See also ==
- Piers Plowman Tradition

== Sources ==
- Bradley, Henry. "The Plowman's Tale." The Athenaeum 3898.12 July 1902: 62.
- Clark, David Paul. "Reaping what was sown: Spenser, Chaucer, and The Plowman's Tale." MA thesis. Iowa State University, 1995.
- Costomeris, Robert. "The Yoke of Canon: Chaucerian Aspects of The Plowman's Tale." Philological Quarterly. 71.2 (1991): 175–198.
- Forni, Kathleen. "The Chaucerian Apocrypha: Did Usk's 'Testament of Love' and the 'Plowman's Tale' Ruin Chaucer's Early Reputation?" Neuphilologische Mitteilungen: Bulletin de la Société Néophilologique [Bulletin of the Modern Language Society, Helsinki, Finland] 98.3 (1997): 261–72.
- ---. The Chaucerian Apocrypha: A Counterfeit Canon. Gainesville: University of Florida Press, 2001.
- Heffernan, Thomas J. "Aspects of Chaucerian Apocrypha: Animadversions of William Thynne's edition of the Plowman's Tale." Chaucer Traditions: Studies in Honor of Derek Brewer. Cambridge: Cambridge University Press, 1990. 155–167.
- Irvine, Annie S. "A Manuscript Copy of The Plowman's Tale." University of Texas Studies in English 12 (1932): 27–56.
- Long, Percy W. "Spenser and the Plowman's Tale." Modern Language Notes 28.8 (1913): 262.
- Patterson, Paul J. "Reforming Chaucer: Margins and Religion in an Apocryphal Canterbury Tale." Book History 8 (2005): 11–36.
- Thorne, J. B. "Piers or Will: Confusion of Identity in the Early Reception of Piers Plowman." Medieum Ævum 60 (1991): 273–84.
- The Plowman's Tale Ed. James Dean. Introduction and Annotated Text. Originally Published in Six Ecclesiastical Satires Kalamazoo, Michigan: Medieval Institute Publications, 1991.
- The Plowman's Tale: The c. 1532 and 1606 Editions of a Spurious Canterbury Tale. Ed. Mary Rhinelander McCarl. New York: Garland Press, 1997.
- The Ploughman's Tale. Ed. Andrew Wawn. PhD Thesis, University of Birmingham, 1969.
- Thynne, Francis. Animadversions uppon the Annotaciouns and Corrections of some Imperfections of Impressions of Chaucers Workes (sett downe before tyme, and nowe) reprinted in the yere of oure lorde 1598. Ed. G. H. Kingsley (1865) EETS OS 9. Rev. edn F. J. Furnivall, 1875. EETS SS 13. Rpt. 1891, 1928 and 1965. Oxford: Oxford University Press, 1965.
- Wawn, Andrew N. "The Plowman's Tale and Reformation Propaganda: The Testimonies of Thomas Godfray and I Playne Piers." Bulletin of the John Rylands Library. 56 (1973): 174–192.
- ---. "The Genesis of The Plowman's Tale." Yearbook of English Studies. 2 (1972): 21–40.
- ---. "The Plowman's Tale." The Spenser Encyclopedia. Gen ed. A. C. Hamilton. Toronto: University of Toronto Press, 1990: 548–49.
- ---. "Chaucer, Wyclif, and the Court of Apollo." English Language Notes 10 (1972–73): 15–20.
