= William of Saint-Amour =

French Christian academic (c. 1200–1272)

William of Saint-Amour was an early figure in thirteenth-century scholasticism, chiefly notable for his withering attacks on the friars.

== Biography ==
William was born in Saint-Amour, Jura, then part of the Duchy of Burgundy, in c. 1200. Under the patronage of the Count of Savoy, he was active at the University of Paris from the 1220s, becoming Master of Arts in 1228. From a reference in a letter by Gregory IX, it is evident that he had become a doctor of Canon law by 1238. By 1250, he had been made master of theology.

The controversy on which his fame rests began in earnest in the 1250s. The gradual encroachment of the newly formed mendicant orders into the university was the immediate cause of this. The secular clergy had previously enjoyed unrivalled teaching privileges at Paris, but the friars presented a serious challenge to their monopoly, gaining a number of prominent lecturing posts: the career of Bonaventure is indicative of the friars' rising stature in academia. The seculars bitterly resented this incursion, and engaged in a prolonged conflict with the friars. According to Matthew Paris' Chronica Majora, this controversy brought the university to a point of near-collapse, 'exposed to danger, owing to the suspension of its lectures and disputations, and the dispersion of many of its scholars...owing to the insults and reproaches of the Preachers and Minors'. Particularly offensive was the friars' desire to increase the number of teaching positions, entirely against established custom. At length the dispute was brought before the papal curia. William had emerged as the mouthpiece of the secular party, and in 1254 he and five other masters directly petitioned Innocent IV. The pope proved sympathetic to their concerns: Innocent duly limited many of the friars' powers, and reduced the number of chairs they could legitimately occupy at the university. This victory, however, was short-lived. Innocent died in the December of the same year, and was replaced by Alexander IV. Alexander was cardinal protector of the Franciscans and therefore unlikely to side with the seculars: he promptly overturned the restrictions imposed by his predecessor, allowing the friars to be readmitted to Paris.

Hostilities resumed immediately, and William began to produce some of his most sustained and vitriolic sermons and treatises. As might be expected, his campaign against the regulars was not tolerated for long. In 1255 Pope Alexander ordered an inquiry into William's orthodoxy, resulting in his suspension from all teaching and administrative duties. In 1256 William produced De periculis novissimorum temporum ("On the Dangers of the Final Days," or "Of the Perils of the Most Recent/Modern Times"), a vicious tirade against the friars, and the culmination of his antifraternal thought. This ridiculed the more extreme eschatological speculations of some friars (e.g., Gerard da Burgo Santo Donnino, author of the Introductorius ad Evangelium Aeternum), who alleged that the fraternal orders would usher in the third and final age of the world, a glorious era of the Holy Spirit. De Periculis implied that the friars would indeed be instrumental in precipitating the end of the world, but only because they would facilitate the coming of the Antichrist. The treatise attracted written opposition from Thomas Aquinas and Albertus Magnus, both Dominican friars, and was examined by a curial committee. Thomas Aquinas wrote Contra Impugnantes to rebut William's charges. In 1257 Alexander ordered William's treatise to be burned: he also excommunicated William, and exiled him from France. Upon Alexander's death in 1266, William returned to Paris, although does not appear to have been reinstated at the university. He died at Burgundy in September 1272.

== Works ==
=== De periculis novissimorum temporum ===
William's major work had an influence far beyond the compass of his own lifetime. It became the fountainhead of a long polemical tradition. Its most important section consists of thirty-nine 'signa' (or forty-one, in some versions) by which 'false Apostles' may be known. Although it is never openly stated, these 'signs' describe the behaviour of friars. The signs are, in order:

I. entry into houses and women's private chambers; II. flattery and deceit; III. refusal to be corrected; IV. boastfulness; V. seeking letters of commendation; VI. preaching without a summons; VII. claiming authority in their own name rather than that of God; VIII. teaching their own traditions rather than the lessons of the gospel; IX. living by begging rather than their own labour; X. rejoicing when praise is given to them rather than to God; XI. preaching for temporal gain; XII. claiming greater authority than parish priests; XIII. extorting goods under pretence of friendship; XIV. arguing against the truth; XV. coercing men to hear or receive them; XVI. defying and enraging secular rulers; XVII. disregarding true prophecies; XVIII. desiring gold and silver from their congregations; XIX. causing discord in the church; XX. not suffering persecution; XXI. ministering to the congregations of parish priests; XXII. obstinacy and pride; XXIII. wishing only to please men; XXIV. desiring luxurious foodstuffs; XXV. preferring the esteem of their neighbours to the grace of God; XXVI. building grand and ornate lodgings; XXVII. prospering from the labour of others while living in idleness; XXVIII. claiming the power to command the Holy Ghost; XXIX. promoting themselves rather than Christ; XXX. participating in secular entertainments; XXXI. dining at the tables of others; XXXII. hatefulness; XXXIII. vengefulness towards all who challenge or question them; XXXIV. preaching only to men already converted to the faith; XXXV. trespassing on other priests' territories; XXXVI. demanding the credit for works God has achieved through them; XXXVII. relying on logic and reason rather than divine revelation; XXXVIII. nepotism; XXXIX. courting worldly support.

William decorates these imputations with various allusions to the Benedictine Rule, the Pauline epistles and Acts of the Apostles. The friars are variously likened to ravening wolves (lupi graves), stealers into people's homes (penetrantes domos), idlers and meddlers (otiosos et curiosos), aimless wanderers (gyrovaguos) and, most recurrently, false preachers (pseudo-praedicatores).

In Penn Szittya's phrase, this set of accusations and themes formed an enduring 'symbolic language', one that persisted among the friars' opponents for the next three centuries. In France, William's attacks were reiterated in the Parisian disputes of 1354, when two prominent bishops delivered diatribes against the friars; they also directly stimulated the satires of Rutebeuf and Jean de Meun. In Ireland, his arguments formed the backbone of Richard Fitzralph's Defensio Curatorum, a much-copied and widely circulated sermon of 1350. In Scotland, Dunbar and Robert Henryson drew on William's motifs; in Germany, the Lutheran pamphleteers Johann Eberlin von Gunzburg and Heinrich Spelt made much use of his ideas. William's work proved especially influential in England, where one of his earliest supporters, a Master Laurence, appears to have been active. The work of Langland, John Gower and Chaucer directly echoes De Periculis, while its key ideas were assimilated into Lollard ideology from Wyclif onwards (see especially Pierce the Ploughman's Crede). William's ideas even re-emerge in the Protestant writings of William Tyndale, John Bale and John Foxe, whose Actes and Monuments quotes De Periculis in its entirety. Although his own struggle against the friars ended in abject failure, William's legacy was thus extremely far-reaching. He powerfully stigmatised one of the dominant factions in the late medieval church, providing generations of critics with an arsenal of ready-made indictments.

== References and external links ==
For a Latin edition and English translation of De Periculis, see: William of Saint-Amour, De periculis novissimorum temporum. Edition, Translation, and Introduction by G. Geltner, Dallas Medieval Texts and Translations 8 (Louvain and Paris: Peeters, 2008). ISBN 978-90-429-2010-1

Jon Robinson of the University of Toronto has made available informal translations of the De Periculis (not based on the translation), two disputed questions, and one sermon, all on his personal web site.

Critical editions of his three extant sermons and his response to Bonaventure's disputed question De mendicitate may be found in Andrew G. Traver, The Opuscula of William of Saint-Amour: The Minor Works of 1255-1256 (Munster: Aschendorff Verlag, 2003) ISBN 3-402-04014-X

Critical editions of his two disputed questions may be found in Andrew G. Traver, 'William of Saint-Amour's Two Disputed Questions De quantitate eleemosynae and De valido mendicante,' Archives d’histoire doctrinale et littéraire du moyen âge 62 (1995): 295–342.

- James Doyne Dawson, 'William of Saint-Amour and the Apostolic Tradition', Mediaeval Studies 40 (1978), pp. 223– 38: online at JSTOR
- Geoffrey Dipple, Antifraternalism and Anticlericalism in the German Reformation: Johann Eberlin von Gunzburg and the Campaign against the Friars, St Andrews Studies in Reformation History (Brookfield: Scolar, 1996), ISBN 1-85928-267-9
- Michel-Marie Dufeil, Guillaume de Saint-Amour et la polémique universitaire parisienne, 1250-1259 (Paris: Picard, 1972)
- John Foxe, Actes and Monuments of matters most speciall and memorable, happenyng in the Church, with an Vniuersall history of the same, wherein is set forth at large the whole race and course of the Church, from the primitiue age to these latter tymes of ours (London: Iohn Daye, 1583), pp. 317–22
- Matthew Paris, English history from the year 1235 to 1273, trans. by J. A. Giles, 3 vols. (London: Henry G. Bohn, 1852–4), III (1854), p. 149: online at Stanford University.
- Penn R. Szittya, 'The Antifraternal Tradition in Middle English', Speculum 52 (1977), pp. 287–313: online at JSTOR
- Penn R. Szittya, The Antifraternal Tradition in Medieval Literature (Princeton: Princeton University Press, 1986), ISBN 0-691-06680-9
- Andrew G. Traver, 'The Forging of an Intellectual Defense of Mendicancy in the Medieval University,' in The Origin, Development, and Refinement of Medieval Religious Mendicancies Ed. Donald Prudlo. (Leiden: Brill, 2011), 157–196.
- Andrew G. Traver, The Opuscula of William of Saint-Amour: The Minor Works of 1255-1256 (Munster: Aschendorff Verlag, 2003), ISBN 3-402-04014-X
- Andrew G. Traver, 'The Place of William of Saint-Amour's Collectiones Catholicae in the Secular/Mendicant Conflict at Paris,' in From Learning to Love: A Tribute Offered to Joseph Goering (Toronto, University of Toronto Press, 2016), 209–232.
- William Turner, 'William of Saint-Amour', The Catholic Encyclopedia: an international work of reference on the constitution, doctrine, discipline and history of the Catholic Church, ed. by Charles George Herberman and others, 15 vols. (New York: Robert Appleton, 1907–12), XV (1912)
- Arnold Williams, 'Chaucer and the Friars', Speculum 28 (1953), pp. 499–513: online at JSTOR
