= William Layton =

William Layton may refer to:

- William Layton (actor), American playwright and actor
- William Layton (by 1514 – 1551 or 1552), MP for Lichfield
- William Layton (MP for Newcastle-under-Lyme), MP for Newcastle-under-Lyme (UK Parliament constituency)
- Bill Layton, English footballer
- Billy Layton, English footballer

== See also ==
- William Leighton (disambiguation)
