= Jack of the North =

Jack of The North identifies an otherwise untitled, short dialogue responding to and supporting anti-enclosure actions in Cambridgeshire in 1549, the year before Kett's Rebellion. The text is printed in Charles Henry Cooper's Annals of Cambridge, which names the source as "Dr. Lamb's Cambridge Documents". The dialogue participants are Jack of the North beyond the style, Robbyn Clowte, Tom of Trompington, Buntynge on the Hyll, Peter Potter, Pyrse Plowman, Symon Slater, Harry Clowte, Whyp Wylliam, and Hodge Hasteler. The two Clowtes and Pyrse Plowman were established poetic personae from John Skelton and William Langland; both would later appear in the poetry of Edmund Spenser.
