= Mum and the Sothsegger =

Fifteenth-century English poem

Mum and the Sothsegger is an anonymous fifteenth-century alliterative English poem, written during the "Alliterative Revival." It is ostensibly an example of medieval debate poetry between the principles of the oppressive figure of Mum ("Silence", as in "to keep mum") and the unruly, wild Sothsegger ("Truth-Speaker", cognate with the modern word "soothsayer").

== Content ==
Beneath the surface of the debate form, the content is primarily that of a medieval satire, meditating on statecraft and attacking state institutions that oppress and exploit the poor. Indeed, this attack on the rich and defence of the poor is a theme found throughout the poem, a typical line being:

Look ye reeche not of the riche and rewe on the poure
That for faute of your fees fallen in thaire pleyntes.

— lines 19–20.

The narrator travels to individual groups to debate the true nature of "Mum" and the "Sothsegger," but instead finds only ignorance (a side-effect of "Mum's" qualities), and discovers that "Mum's" pervasive influence lies at the heart of corruption within the King's advisers, nobles, scholars (clerks), priests, archbishops, friars, mayors, and city councillors.

In its latter stages the poem also includes an extended dream vision (ll. 871–1287), where the idealised Sothsegger king is presented as a beekeeper, exterminating unproductive drones who are intent on stealing the honey created by the other worker bees. This leads the narrator to then debate on medieval dream theory and the value of dreams.

The poem then ends with the narrator consulting a variety of texts and stories, including a collection of "pryvé poyse" (l. 1344) detailing political abuses, a story of Genghis Khan (from the Travels of John Mandeville), a "raggeman rolle" (l. 1565) supposedly composed by The Devil, and a prophecy of Merlin.

== Critical history ==
Due to some similarities with Piers Plowman, it was suggested in the 19th century by W. W. Skeat that William Langland wrote the piece, but this theory is no longer accepted by the academic community.

Mum and the Sothsegger also became heavily intertwined with the fifteenth-century poem Richard the Redeless. Indeed, John Bale (1495–1563), an important early antiquarian, wrongly identified the poem Skeat named Richard the Redeless as "Mum, Soth-segger". This link between the two poems continued to the early 20th century, with Day and Steele declaring in their EETS edition that "the two fragments form part of one larger composition." This assertive opinion has also generally fallen out of favour within the academic community for a more nuanced and cautious belief. As James Dean argues: "The two alliterative fragments do have much in common. They both presume to advise a king, include satirical critiques, and imitate Piers Plowman, by far the most important source for both poems. They both have an intimate knowledge of law and the courts, which has led some to believe that the author or authors were law clerks. Both poems manifest a delight in word play, though this is typical of alliterative poems generally. But the differences are striking as well. Richard the Redeless focuses wholly and exclusively on Richard II and the latter part of his reign, whereas Mum ignores Richard's rule to concentrate exclusively on problems during Henry IV's administration... Richard the Redeless contains specific allusions to events and personalities of Richard II's reign, but this is not the case with Mum... to be a truth teller and name names may have proved too much for him. He prefers more general, satirical attacks to explicit personalities or incidents... It seems best to hold open the possibility that there may be a connection between them, but there may not be.

== See also ==
- Piers Plowman tradition
