= John Bon and Mast Parson =

1547/1548 book by John Day and William Seres

John Bon and Mast Parson is a literary work printed in 1547 or 1548 by John Day and William Seres as the work of "Lucas Shepeherd", possibly a pseudonym.

John Bale uses the alternative names 'Lucas Opilio' and 'Lucas Shepeherd' for the author, who was probably a poet and physician from Colchester in Essex, a friend of Edward Underhill and the author of eight anti-Catholic verse satires (mostly in tetrameter) and one prose satire in the time of King Edward VI. His work attacks the mass, transubstantiation, the feast of Corpus Christi, the Roman Catholic clergy and doctrine, and clerical celibacy. Bishop Stephen Gardiner, William Layton, and Dr Richard Smith are specifically targeted.

Shepherd imitated John Skelton, sharing his "predilection for vigorous colloquial vocabulary, macaronic diction, copious verse catalogues and scatological innuendo", as well as run-on rhymes, alliteration, puns, and sexual innuendo. Shepherd was such a good imitator that several of his poems were misattributed to Skelton.

John Bon led to Shepherd's being jailed, but it was popular at court and earned the compliments of Sir John Gresham. John King describes it as "a memorable fusion of medieval and Lutheran" satire, the latter being represented in the German works of Hans Sachs. The work attacks the feast of Corpus Christi and transubstantiation as the title character, a simple plowman, bests a priest in argumentation about these subjects on the eve of Corpus Christi. King speculates that the publication may have been timed to coincide with the disestablishment of that feast in 1548 by Archbishop Thomas Cranmer.

Shepherd's satires are available in a critical edition by Janice Devereux from the Arizona Center for Medieval and Renaissance Studies.

== See also ==
- Piers Plowman tradition
