= Bertha Marian Skeat =

British schoolmistress (1861–1948)

- Born: 30 December 1861; Dereham
- Died: 2 December 1948 (aged 86); Sedbergh
- Education: Newnham College; University of Zurich
- Known for: founder of school
- Parent(s): Bertha Clara and Walter William Skeat

Bertha Marian Skeat or Bertha Skeat (30 December 1861 – 2 December 1948) was a British writer and schoolmistress.

== Life ==
Skeat was born in East Dereham in 1861. She was the first child of Bertha Clara and Walter William Skeat. She had five siblings including the anthropologist Walter William Skeat. Her father was a philologist. She was a student at Newnham College in Cambridge from 1882 to 1886 where she achieved a first-class examination result in medieval and modern languages.

She then obtained a Cambridge teacher's certificate and a doctorate at the University of Zürich. In 1890 she started teaching as a lecturer at the Cambridge Teaching College for Women. In 1899 she co-founded and became the principal of Baliol School for Girls in Sedbergh. She wrote plays and poems as well as academic textbooks. Her linguistic skills enabled her to create a list of modern English words that contained Anglo-French vowel sounds which was published by the English Dialect Society in 1884. She also wrote a primer and two anthologies for use in teaching English. The school she founded closed in 1932.

Skeat died in Sedbergh unmarried on 2 December 1948. She was buried with her mother and father.

== Works ==
- The Lamentations of Mary Magdalene – a play (1897)
- Atalanta's Race – a play (1907)
- The Crucifixion of Mary, and other Poems (1924)
- Sedbergh Dreams (1930)
