= A Proper Dialogue Between A Gentleman and a Husbandman =

1529 book printed by Hans Luft

A proper dyaloge betwene a Gentilman and a Husbandman eche complaynynge to other their miserable calamite through the ambicion of the clergye was printed in two versions by "Hans Luft" (i.e., Johannes Hoochstraten) of Antwerp in 1529. This book appears in Robert Steele's list of books banned in Henry VIII's reign; Steele refers to it as "Dialogue between gentleman & plowman." While clearly in the Piers Plowman Tradition, Piers does not appear as a character. The first version has a 684 line acrostic poem opening and dialogue that was written in the sixteenth-century invention. Following this, there is an authentic, late fourteenth-century Lollard anti-clerical text, written ca. 1375–85. (It is included in Matthew, ed. The English Works of Wyclif.) To all this, the second version adds another prose tract probably from the late fifteenth century, which argues in favor of vernacular Bible translations.

The dialogue begins with the gentleman lamenting how his class has fallen low and is unable to help the poor, because long ago they were fooled into giving their lands and wealth to the church. The husbandman then argues for confiscating the possessions of a corrupt clergy which preys upon the poor. Belief in purgatory and indulgences is singled out as the favorite swindle of the clergy, who are ultimately to blame for rising rents. The husbandman suggests taking the issue to parliament (the 1529 "Reformation Parliament"), but the gentleman demurs, alluding to Simon Fish's A Supplicacyon for the Beggers and Thomas More's rebuttal and defense of purgatory in The Supplycacyon of Soulys (1529). King John, Sir John Oldcastle, and Humphrey, Duke of Gloucester are listed as good men who came to bad ends for opposing the clergy. Then there is an allusion to the burning of William Tyndale's New Testament in 1526 and Henry V's persecution of Lollards. To defend Lutherans and opposition to clerical possessions from charges of "newfangledness," the husbandman introduces what he takes to be a century-old treatise; i.e., a late-fourteenth-century Lollard text that supports disendowment of the clergy and barring them from secular offices. (The husbandman places it in the time of Richard II.)

Now I promyse the after my iudgement
I haue not hard of soche an olde fragment
Better groundyd on reason with Scripture.
Yf soche auncyent thynges myght come to lyght
That noble men hadde ones of theym a syght
The world yet wolde chaunge perauenture
For here agaynst the clergye cannot bercke
Sayenge as they do thys is a newe wercke
Of heretykes contryued lately.
And by thys treatyse it apperyth playne
That before oure dayes men did compleyne
Agaynst clerkes ambycyon so stately.

The "I" of the husbandman at this point leads into the "I" of the Lollard treatise which is attached at the end with little done to make a transition; it is revised to function as contemporary anti-Roman polemic.

== See also ==
- Dissolution of the Monasteries
- Piers Plowman Tradition
