= Vernon Manuscript =

Late medieval English manuscript

- Bodleian Library
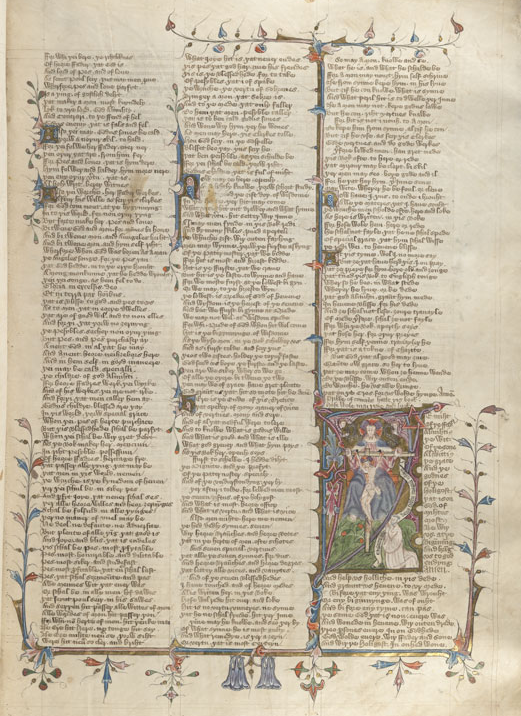
- MS. Eng. poet. a. 1 (Vernon Manuscript) Folio 265r, showing blue columbine flowers, a praying figure in a religious habit and the image of God the Father with Christ on the cross in the interlace that decorates the initial and frames
- Date: c. 1400
- Language(s): Middle English

The Vernon Manuscript (Bodleian Library MS. Eng. poet. a. 1) is a medieval English manuscript, written in the dialect spoken in the English West Midlands around 1400, that is now in the Bodleian Library, to whom it was presented around 1677 by Colonel Edward Vernon. It has been described as "the biggest and most important surviving late medieval English manuscript" and "one of the Bodleian Library’s greatest treasures".

The manuscript is lavishly illustrated and decorated, and includes 370 poetry and prose texts on moral or religious subjects, intended to be read by the pious. It has over 700 pages and weighs 22 kilograms (49 lb). The Bodleian Library estimates that the manuscript was compiled around the final decade of the fourteenth century.

An online exhibition of the manuscript is curated by Professor Wendy Scase of the University of Birmingham. A facsimile and transcription are available commercially.
