= Pierce the Ploughman's Crede =

Medieval alliterative poem

The frontispiece of Reyner Wolfe's edition of Pierce the Ploughman's Crede, printed in 1553

Pierce the Ploughman's Crede is a medieval alliterative poem of 855 lines, lampooning the four orders of friars.

== Textual history ==
Surviving in two complete 16th-century manuscripts and two early printed editions, the Crede can be dated on internal evidence to the short period between 1393 and 1400. The text in British Library MS Royal 18.B.17 appears before a C-text version of Piers Plowman in the same hand; that in Trinity College Cambridge MS R.3.15 is by a clerk in Archbishop Matthew Parker's household, who added Chaucer-related materials before a deficient 15th-century Canterbury Tales manuscript, and the Crede at the end of the manuscript. Additionally, BL MS Harley 78 contains a fragment of the Crede copied c. 1460–70.

The Crede was first printed in London by Reyner Wolfe, and then reprinted for inclusion with Owen Rogers's 1561 reprint of Robert Crowley's 1550 edition of Piers Plowman. The Crede was not printed again until Thomas Bensley's edition in 1814, based on that of 1553, and Thomas Wright's of 1832. The 1553 and 1561 editions were altered to include more anticlericalism and to attack an "abbot" where the original text had "bishop". This latter revision is a conservative one, undoubtedly motivated by the security of attacking a defunct institution following the dissolution of the monasteries rather than an aspect of Catholicism which survived in the Church of England. Nearly all modern critics have agreed that several lines about transubstantiation were removed. This excision was covered with a (perhaps interpolated) passage not found in any of the manuscripts.

The poem exists in several modern editions: Thomas Wright and Walter Skeat produced independent versions in the 19th century; more recently, James Dean has edited the text for TEAMs, and Helen Barr has produced an annotated edition in The Piers Plowman Tradition (London: J.M. Dent, 1993) (ISBN 0-460-87050-5).

== Authorship ==
Some scholars believe it is very likely that the author of the Crede may also be responsible for the anti-fraternal Plowman's Tale, also known as the Complaint of the Ploughman. Both texts were probably composed at about the same time, with The Plowman's Tale being later and drawing extensively on the Crede. The author/speaker of The Plowman's Tale mentions that he will not deal with friars, since he has already dealt with them "before, / In a making of a 'Crede'..." W. W. Skeat believed that The Plowman's Tale and the Crede were definitely by the same person, although they differ in style. Others reject this thesis, suggesting that the author of The Plowman's Tale makes the extra-textual reference to a creed to enhance his own authority.

In the sixteenth and seventeenth centuries, the Crede was usually attributed to Chaucer. The editor of the 1606 edition of The Plowman's Tale, possibly Anthony Wotton, explains his speculations with this gloss: "A Creede: Some think hee means the questions of Jack-vpland, or perhaps Pierce Ploughmans Creede. For Chaucer speaks this in the person of the Pelican, not in his own person." This statement is ambivalent, suggesting that Chaucer could fictionally ("in the person of the Pelican") claim authorship for another text that he may not have actually written (i.e., the Crede), or Chaucer might be referring to one of his own writings (i.e., Jack Upland). Since Jack Upland was definitely (and wrongly) attributed to Chaucer in the 16th century, the editor is likely introducing the possibility of a fictive authorship claim to deal with the possibility that The Plowman's Tale refers to the Crede. In this way the editor may have thought that if Jack Upland is signified by the "crede" reference in The Plowman's Tale, then "Chaucer" is speaking; if the Crede is signified, then it is the "Pelican, not [Chaucer's] own person."

The Crede might also have been attributed to "Robert Langland" (i.e., William Langland) because of its inclusion in the 1561 edition of Piers Plowman, although this edition dropped the preface by Robert Crowley that names Langland. One reader of the 1561 Piers Plowman (which appends the Crede) made notes (dated 1577) in his copy that quote John Bale's attribution of Piers Plowman to Langland ("ex primis J. Wiclevi discipulis Unum") in Bale's Index...Scriptorum. Because of differences in language and his belief that Chaucer lived later than Langland, the reader concludes that the Crede alone (and not Piers Plowman) is Chaucer's.

== Significant contents ==
Like much political or religious poetry of the Alliterative Revival (i.e., Piers Plowman, Mum and the Sothsegger), the poem takes the form of a quest for knowledge. It is narrated by a layman who has memorized nearly all of the rudimentary texts demanded by the Fourth Lateran Council. He can read, and can recite the Ave Maria and Pater Noster proficiently: yet he does not know the Creed. He seeks help from the friars, first turning to the Franciscans, then the Dominicans, followed by the Austin friars and the Carmelites. But rather than learning anything of value, all he hears are imprecations. Each order savagely attacks one of its rival groups of mendicants: the Franciscans denounce the Carmelites; the Carmelites denounce the Dominicans; the Dominicans denounce the Augustines; the Augustines complete this carousel of invective by denouncing the Franciscans. The entire poem seems like an uproarious inversion of cantos xi and xii of Dante's Paradiso: just as Dante has the Dominican Aquinas and the Franciscan Bonaventure lauding one another's orders, so the Crede-poet makes the mendicants exchange abuse.

But all is not entirely lost. As he returns home, the narrator encounters a poor Plowman, dressed in rags and so emaciated that men myyte reken ich a ryb (432). Although starving, the Plowman freely offers the narrator what food he does have. When the narrator tells him of his experiences with the friars, the Plowman launches into a blistering diatribe on the four orders. Recognizing the wisdom of the Plowman's words, the narrator asks him whether he can teach him the Creed. He is glad to do so: the poem ends with the Plowman's recital of the elusive text.

Two features make the Crede particularly worthy of note. Firstly, it is the earliest text to imitate William Langland's Piers Plowman, to which it refers explicitly. The selfless Plowman is of course directly drawn from the earlier work. Perhaps written within eight years of the C-text of Piers Plowman, the Crede thus testifies to the appeal of Langland's more subversive, anticlerical sentiments among some of his early readers. Of course, the Crede-poet only uses Piers Plowman as a launch-pad for his own views. The Crede is markedly more confident than Langland in its opposition to the clergy. The fact that it abandons Langland's dream-vision framework is suggestive of this as if the lay perfection that the Plowman represents has become more achievable in reality. The Crede conflates Piers (here, "Peres") with the author/dreamer of Piers Plowman, thus collapsing that poem's many voices into a single, collective voice of the ideal community. This misprision was a common aspect of Piers Plowman's dissemination. The character of Piers thus escapes from the confines of William Langland's vision and takes on a life, an authority, and an authorial career of his own. As in The Plowman's Tale and The Prayer and Complaint of the Plowman, true religion is the virtue of the poor. The Piers of the Crede is simply a plowman without the Christological aspect of Piers in Langland's poem.

A second, related point of interest is that the Crede is a Lollard production that acknowledges the influence of Walter Map's Latin, anti-monastic "Goliardic" satires, such as "The Apocalypse of Bishop Golias" and "The Confession of Golias." The author of the Crede claims that these works tarnished the monastic orders and brought on the mendicant orders, or else Satan himself founded them. With clear Lollard sympathies, the Crede praises John Wycliffe and as well as Walter Brut who is mentioned concerning his heresy trial. (There were several trials for Brut, a Welsh Lollard, from 1391 to 1393.)

The Crede's content wholly conforms to Lollard views of the friars. Most of the charges against the friars are familiar from other works such as Jack Upland, the Vae Octuplex or Wyclif's Trialogus, and most are ultimately derived from William of Saint-Amour's De Periculis Novissimorum Temporum (1256). As in all Wycliffite satire, the friars are lecherous, covetous, greedy, vengeful, demanding extravagant donations for even the most elementary services. They seek out only the fattest corpses to bury and live in ostentatious houses that are more like palaces than places of worship. They are the children of Lucifer rather than Saint Dominic or St Francis, and follow in the footsteps of Cain, the first treacherous frater. But the fact that the poem's main approach is dramatic rather than didactic or polemic, and its frequent passages of striking physical description, elevate it beyond the vast bulk of antifraternal writing. Elizabeth Salter's charge of empty 'sensationalism' seems highly unjust. The poem's vicious and unremitting attacks are impressively constructed, and even entertaining in their lacerating cynicism. Plus, as von Nolcken and Barr have shown, there is a remarkable subtlety to the poem, as it draws on even the most purely philosophical aspects of Wyclif's system. The opposition between the friars and Piers is finely crafted. While the friars squabble and bicker with one another, the true (i.e., Lollard) Christians form a single unity; at the end of the poem, in the words of Barr, 'the voices of Peres, narrator and poet all merge' into a single 'I':

all þat euer I have seyd soþ it me semeþ,/
And all þat euer I have written is soþ, as I trowe,/
And for amending of þise men is most þat I write
--(836-8).

== See also ==
- Piers Plowman tradition

== References and further reading ==
- Helen Barr, Signes and Sothe: Language in the Piers Plowman Tradition (Cambridge: D.S. Brewer, 1994) ISBN 0-85991-419-4.
- Doyne Dawson, James (1978). "William of Saint-Amour and the Apostolic Tradition". Mediaeval Studies. 40: 223–238. doi:10.1484/J.MS.2.306227.
- Doyle, A. I. (1959). "An Unrecognized Piece of Piers the Ploughman's Creed and Other Work by Its Scribe". Speculum. 34 (3): 428–36. doi:10.2307/2850818. JSTOR 2850818. S2CID 163035289.
- George Kane, "Some Fourteenth-Century 'Political' Poems", in Medieval English Religious and Ethical Literature: Essays in Honour of G. H. Russell, ed. by Gregory Kratzmann and James Simpson (Cambridge: D.S. Brewer, 1986), pp. 82–91. ISBN 0-85991-220-5.
- Ritchie D. Kendall, The Drama of Dissent: The Radical Poetry of Nonconformity, 1380–1590 (Chapel Hill: University of North Carolina Press, 1986) ISBN 0-8078-1700-7
- David Lampe, "The Satiric Strategy of Peres the Ploughman's Crede" in The Alliterative Tradition in the Fourteenth Century, ed. Bernard S. Levy and Paul E. Szarmach (Kent: Kent State University Press, 1981), pp. 69–80. ISBN 0-87338-255-2
- Von Nolcken, Christina (1988). "Piers Plowman, the Wycliffites, and Pierce the Plowman's Creed". The Yearbook of Langland Studies. 2: 71–102. doi:10.1484/J.YLS.2.302952.
- Elizabeth Salter, Fourteenth-Century English Poetry: contexts and readings (Oxford: Clarendon Press, 1984) ISBN 0-19-871102-6.
- Szittya, Penn R. (1977). "The Antifraternal Tradition in Middle English". Speculum. 52 (2): 287–313. doi:10.2307/2850514. JSTOR 2850514. S2CID 162539724.
- Penn R. Szittya, The Antifraternal Tradition in Medieval Literature (Princeton: Princeton University Press, 1986) ISBN 0-691-06680-9.
- Lawrence Warner, 'Owen Rogers and Piers Plowman’s Crede, 1561: A Census of STC 19908', in Later Middle English Literature, Materiality, and Culture: Essays in Honor of James M. Dean, ed. Brian Gastle and Erick Kelemen (Newark: University of Delaware Press, 2018), pp. 189–218.
