= William Leighton (disambiguation) =

William Leighton was a composer and also MP for Much Wenlock.

William Leighton may also refer to:

- William T. Leighton, architect
- William Leighton (Lord Mayor of London), Lord Mayor of London in 1806
- William Allport Leighton, botanist
- William Leighton (Poet), 19th Century writer of Sons of Godwin (1876), Change (1878), Shakespeare's Dream and Other Poems (1881), etc., and manager of a glass factory.
- William Leighton Sr (glassmaker) - glassmaker and chemist who discovered a new formula for soda-lime glass in 1864 that revolutionized the American glassmaking industry

== See also ==
- William Layton (disambiguation)
