= Plowboy trope =

Christian rhetoric and literature

The plowboy trope appears in Christian rhetoric and literature in the form of various bucolic, lowly, pious or even unsavoury characters who would benefit from being exposed to Scripture in the vernacular. The plowboy trope is an anti-elitist trope dating back at least 1600 years.

== Appearances ==
=== Jerome (386) ===
The trope starts with St. Jerome's letter eulogizing the region of Bethlehem, where he lived, remarking on how the local popular songs' lyrics were from the Psalms:

in the village of Christ all is rusticity: and, except for the chanting of psalms, silent. Whereever you turn the ploughman holding his plough sings alleluia, the sweaty reaper rouses himself with psalms, and the vine-dresser sings David. These are the songs of this country; these, in the popular phrase, its love ditties: these the shepherd whistles; they arm the tiller.

— Epistle 46

=== John Chrysostom ===
St. John Chrysostom (c. 400) invokes a related set of characters who can understand Christ's few and plain words to love God and neighbour:

And these things even to a ploughman, and to a servant, and to a widow woman, and to a very child, and to him that appears to be exceedingly slow of understanding, are all plain to comprehend and easy to learn.

— First Homily on Gospel of Matthew

=== Amalarius ===
Amalarius's Liber officialis (c. 830) does not supply a cast of characters, but makes the cantor of the Mass, by analogy, into a ploughman, and so utilizing the trope's the other elements of ploughing, singing and simple sincerity:

The earth is furrowed as the oxen drag the plough when the cantors, drawing their innermost breath, drag forth a sweet voice and present it to the people. They goad their own hearts, as well as the hearts of others, to tears and the confession of sins, as if laying bare the hidden parts of the earth.

— Liber officialis

=== Gerard Zerbolt van Zutphen (1393) ===
Gerard Zerbolt of Zutphen was one of the first of the Brothers of the Common Life at Deventer.

Quocumque te verteris, arator stivam tenens allelujah decantat, sudans messor Psalmis se avocat, et curva attondens vitem falce vinitor aliquid Davidicum canit.

Wherever you turn, the plowman holding the sheaf sings hallelujah, the sweating reaper invokes Psalms, and the vinedresser cutting the vine with a crooked sickle sings something Davidic

— De libris teutonicalibus, 2nd appendix

=== Erasmus of Rotterdam (1516) ===
The opening exhortation of the first edition of Erasmus' Novum Instrumentum omne pleads for vernacular use of the Gospel texts, especially memorized and vocalized versions, and with an emphasis on women:

I wish that even the lowliest women read the gospels and the Pauline Epistles. ...would that, as a result, the farmer sing some portion of them at the plow, the weaver hum some parts of them to the movement of his shuttle, the traveler lighten the weariness of the journey with stories from this source, and that the discussions of all Christians would start from these books.

— Paraclecis

This was expanded in the third edition of 1522 (and re-used in Dominican friar, Marmochino, 1638 Italian Bible's preface):

Some think it offensive to have the sacred books turned into English or French, but the evangelists turned into Greek what Christ spoke in Syriac, nor did the Latins fear to turn the words of Christ into the Roman tongue—that is, to offer them to the promiscuous multitude...Like St. Jerome I think it a great triumph and glory to the cross if it is celebrated by the tongues of all men; if the farmer at the plow sings some of the mystic Psalms, and the weaver sitting at the shuttle often refreshes himself with something from the Gospel. Let the pilot at the rudder hum over a sacred tune, and the matron sitting with gossip or friend at the colander recite something from it.

— Paraclesis

Erasmus combined Jerome and Chrysostom's cast, and added more characters in his Paraphrase of St Matthew (1524):

This was the class from which he chose disciples of the gospel philosophy, not only fishermen and unlettered, but even by nature rather slow to understand, as is apparent from the considerable evidence of the Gospel. ... Let us not keep children from reading the Gospels. ...

Let us reflect on what sort of hearers Christ himself had. Were they not the indiscriminate crowd including the blind, lame, beggars, tax collectors, centurions, craftsmen, women and children? (Note: Erasmus revisited this list in his Ecclesiastes: "The preacher is obliged to minister to the wise and the foolish, to boys and girls, to youths, to men and matrons, to old men and old women, to magistrates and merchants, to sailors and shoemakers, to soldiers and farmers, even to the pimps and prostitutes, for he must serve the high and the low.") Would he be vexed if he were read by those he wanted to hear him? Indeed, if I have my way, the farmer, the smith, the stone-cutter will read him, prostitutes and pimps will read him, (Note: A squeamish Victorian rendered these as "clowns and mechanics") even the Turks will read him. ... They cry that it is an unseemly act if a woman or tanner speaks about Holy Scriptures. But I would rather have some girls speaking about Christ than I would certain teachers. ... the French in French, the English in English, the Germans in German, the Indian in the language of India...

If it be the ploughman guiding his plough, let him chant in his own language the mystic psalms. If it be the weaver sitting at his loom, let him ease his labour by citing in rhythm something from a gospel. For the same let the skipper as he steers his boat give voice. Finally, let a friend or relative recite something from this (paraphrase or gospel) for the matron who sits spinning.

In the same material, Erasmus noted with approval that Jerome encouraged "virgins, wives and widows" to read but spoke against the mangled, unfit interpretations of "the garrulous hag, the delirious old man, the loquacious sophist."

Note the vocal rather than mental emphasis:

I have never said that anyone at all should translate the sacred books into the vernacular, not have I ever myself undertaken such a thing. In fact I frankly confess that it is better for the common people to learn through the spoken voice, viva voce, if a good teacher is available

— Apologia adversus Petrum Sutorem, 1525

A French Carthusian opponent of vernacular translation, Petrus Sutor, in 1524 wrote of the dangers that a woman engrossed in the Scriptures would neglect her domestic duties, and a soldier would be slow to fight.

=== Middle English Plowmen ===
The plowman was independently a literary figure in Middle English poetry with an anti-elitist, anti-simonatical and even political edge. The high societal value of ploughing was given in such songs as I-blessyd Be Cristes Sonde (God spede the plough), and their misfortune in Song of the Husbandman.

Initially this was a solid peasant who could articulate their faith. Chaucer wrote of a good and pious ploughman. Margaret Deanesly quotes a poem (before 1400), of an (illiterate) ploughman, taught orally by the community, going to his annual confession where the priest had to check his knowledge of the Creed and Gospel:

In Lenten times the parson him did shrive:
He said "Sir, canst thou they believe?"
The ploughman said unto the priest
"Sir, I believe in Jesu Christ
which suffered death and harrowed hell,
as I have heard mine elders tell."

At times, the plowman was a religious radical who speaks the plain truth for the poor, godly commons against corrupt elites and hypocritical English clergy. The most famous is the late 13th-century alliterative allegorical poem Piers Plowman. (Note: It has also been suggested as a prototype for the c. 1401 New High German prose work "The Ploughman and Death" (German: Der Ackermann aus Böhmen) which does not participate in the Jerome-Erasmus trope: the plow is a pen, the plowman a writer.) The figure reappears in a work perhaps from the turn of the 15th century, the Lollard satire Piers the Ploughman's Creed; a related work Mum and the Sothsegger features an ancient gardener (c. lines 976.)

In the early Tudor period, the play Gentleness and Nobility features a plowman debating a knight and a merchant, about the social disruption of enclosure.

A Late Middle English or Scots work "The Prayer of the Ploughman", perhaps of Lollard origins, says "a lewd man may serve God as well as a man of religion; though that the ploughman ne may not have so much silver for his prayer, as men of religion."

=== William Tyndale (1520s) ===
The versions attributed to William Tyndale come from a much later report by John Foxe of a squabble at a dinner party and may be apocryphal. There are various versions in circulation:

I defy the Pope and all his laws: and ... if God spared him life, ere many years he [Tyndale] would cause a boy that drives the plough to know more of the Scripture than he [the Catholic priest] did.

— John Foxe Book 8, Acts and Monuments, 1583, p1101

In the name of God, I defy the Pope and all his laws: and ... if God spare my life, ere many years I will cause the boy that drives the plough to know more of God’s law than either you or the Pope.

— Quarterly Review, 1870

The version attributed to Tyndale combined Erasmus' trope of the devout worker with the English popular image of the protesting pious plowman. It maintains the anti-elitist stance, but not characteristic of singing/devotion of the Jerome-Erasmus thread.

Some LDS commentators see Tyndale's purported statement as a prophecy of Joseph Smith, who had been a ploughboy.

=== Rheims New Testament (1582) ===
The Douay–Rheims Bible's preface pointed out that when the scriptures (or New Testament, at least) were written and circulated, the books were never in private, uneducated hands and used casually. In place of that anachronism, it posits what some might consider another: the characteristic Catholic emphasis of a liturgy-centred Christian life, in which scripture is experienced through the liturgy (or the Mass or of the Hours):

(You must not imagine that in the primitive church)...the translated bibles into vulgar tongues were in the hands of every husbandman, arbiter, prentice, boies, girles, mistresse, maid, man: that they were sung, played, alleged, of every tinker, taverner, rhymer, minstrel: that they were for table talk, ale benches, for boats and barges. ... No ...The poore ploughman could then in labouring the ground sing the hymnes and psalms either in known or unknown languages as they heard them in the Holy Church, though they could neither read nor know the sense, meaning, and mysteries of the same. (Note: Note: The passage likely is pointing out that the primitive church in most places initially used Koine Greek, even in Latin-speaking areas such as Rome.)

— Preface, Third Edition, Rheims New Testament (1582)

== Other uses ==
The plowboy trope has also been attributed, perhaps in confusion with Tyndale, to John Wycliff and Martin Luther.

A 16th-century Catholic controversialist Johann Cochlaeus also weighed in:

... even tailors and shoemakers, yea, even women and ignorant persons who had accepted this new Lutheran gospel, and could read a little German, studied it with the greatest avidity as the fountain of all truth. Some committed it to memory, and carried it about in their bosom. In a few months such people deemed themselves so learned that they were not ashamed to dispute about faith and the gospel not only with Catholic laymen, but even with priests and monks and doctors of divinity.

A modern variant, with a different singing motif, is

In October 1536, at only 42 years of age, Tyndale's one-note voice was silenced as he was tied to the stake, strangled by the executioner, and then consumed in the fire. But because of his vernacular English translation, the song itself swelled into a mighty British chorus of chambermaids, cobblers, and, yes, even plowboys.

In Hilary Mantel's fiction Wolf Hall, her character Thomas Cromwell adopts the antagonistic mode of Tyndale:

"The sheep farmers are grown so great that the little man is knocked off his acres and the plowboy is out of house and home. In a generation these people can learn to read. The plowman can take up a book."
