= God Spede the Plough =

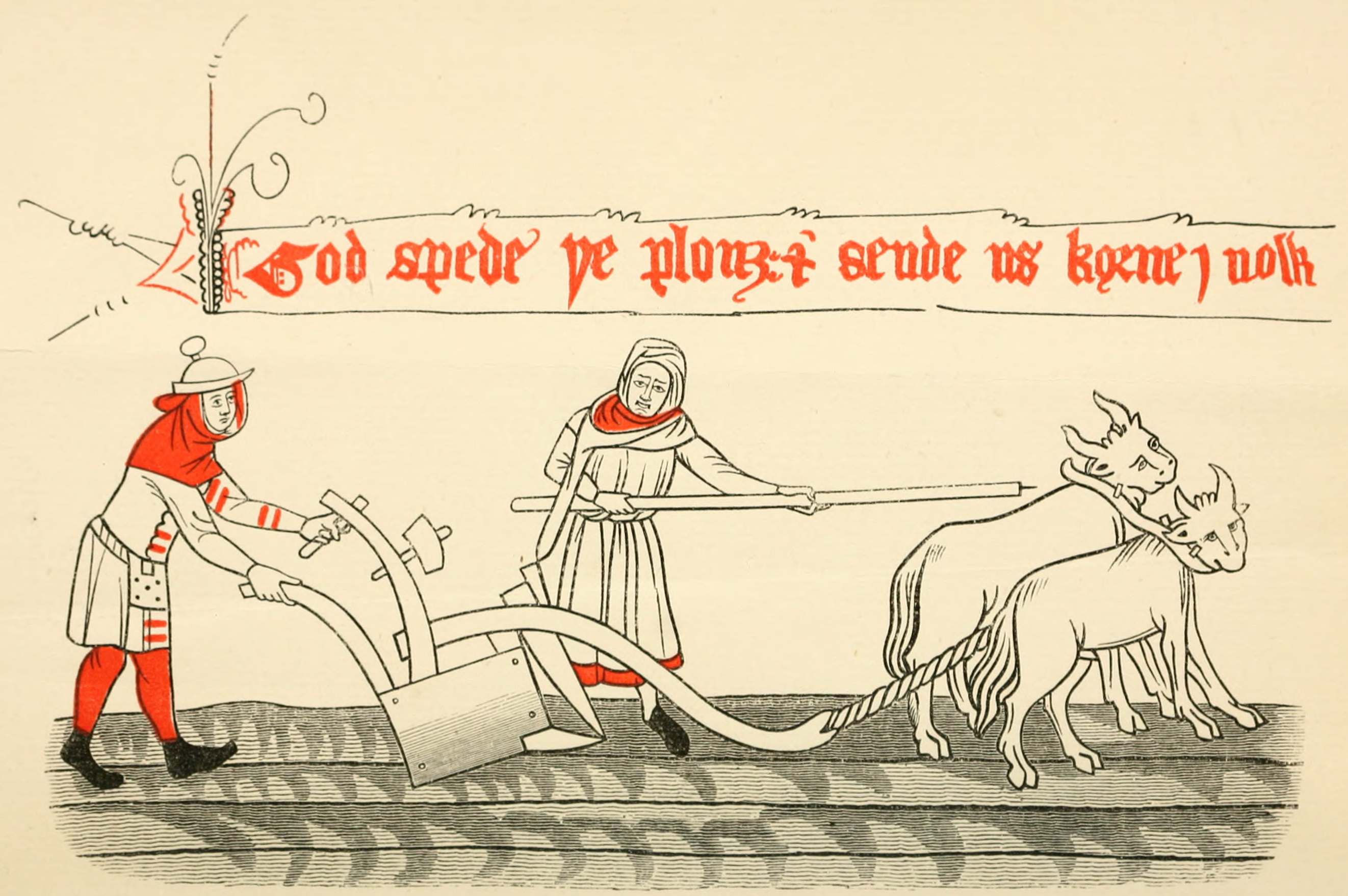
Piers Ploughman Decoration

"God Spede the Plough" is an early 16th-century manuscript poem that borrows twelve stanzas from Geoffrey Chaucer's Monk's Tale. It is a short satirical complaint listing the various indolent members of the clergy who will demand a share of the ploughman's harvest, rendering his work futile.

The work contains a possible allusion to the First Epistle to the Corinthians 9:10: "...when the ploughman ploughs and the thresher threshes, they ought to do so in the hope of sharing the harvest". This verse is used by St Paul in an argument that the food and other basic needs of the Apostles ("we [who] have sown spiritual seed among you") should be supplied by the laity of the early Christian church. The poem also deprecates taxation and issues the same sort of complaint as that found in the Second Shepherds' Play.

== See also ==
- Piers Plowman tradition
