= Richard the Redeless =

Fifteenth-century English poem

Richard the Redeless ("Richard without counsel") is an anonymous fifteenth-century English alliterative poem that critiques Richard II's kingship and his court, seeking to offer Richard retrospective (or even posthumous) advice, following his deposition by Henry IV in 1399. The poet claims that "Richard has been poorly advised, his kingdom mismanaged, his loyal subjects ill-served." The author believes that the advice he imparts will be of great aid to any guiding the kingdom in future years. The poem also contains elements of satire, especially towards court manners and clothing fashions.

== Critical history ==
The history of Richard the Redeless has become heavily intertwined with another fifteenth-century poem, Mum and the Sothsegger. Indeed, John Bale (1495–1563), an important early antiquarian, identified what Skeat named Richard the Redeless as "Mum, Soth-segger". This link between the two poems continued to the early 20th century, with Day and Steele declaring in their EETS edition that "the two fragments form part of one larger composition." This assertive opinion has also generally fallen out of favour within the academic community for a more nuanced and cautious belief. As James Dean argues: "The two alliterative fragments do have much in common. They both presume to advise a king, include satirical critiques, and imitate Piers Plowman, by far the most important source for both poems. They both have an intimate knowledge of law and the courts, which has led some to believe that the author or authors were law clerks. Both poems manifest a delight in word play, though this is typical of alliterative poems generally. But the differences are striking as well. Richard the Redeless focuses wholly and exclusively on Richard II and the latter part of his reign, whereas Mum ignores Richard's rule to concentrate exclusively on problems during Henry IV's administration... Richard the Redeless contains specific allusions to events and personalities of Richard II's reign, but this is not the case with Mum... to be a truth teller and name names may have proved too much for him. He prefers more general, satirical attacks to explicit personalities or incidents... It seems best to hold open the possibility that there may be a connection between them, but there may not be."

== See also ==
- Piers Plowman tradition
