= Walter William Skeat (anthropologist) =

English anthropologist (1866–1953)

Walter William Skeat (14 October 1866 – 24 July 1953) was an English anthropologist. He made a name for himself mainly with his pioneering investigations into, and writings on, the ethnography of the Malay Peninsula.

== Early life ==
Skeat was born in Cambridge in England. He was the son of Walter William Skeat the elder, philologist and Professor of Anglo-Saxon at the University of Cambridge. His sister was the headteacher Bertha Marian Skeat.

Skeat the younger attended Highgate School from 1879 to 1885 and won a scholarship to Christ's College, Cambridge where he studied classics and received an MA degree in 1891. He then entered the Straits Settlements civil service in Selangor, a state in what is now Malaysia.

== Career ==
Skeat began to study both the urbanised Malay people living near the coast and the aboriginal tribes dwelling inland. He prepared his first book in the years leading up to 1899, when he began to mount expeditions to the interior to study the anthropology and ethnography of Malays in areas beyond any marked European influence. His friend and associate Charles Otto Blagden saw the book through publication; it dealt with Malay magic and appeared in 1900.

Skeat and Blagden subsequently produced Skeat's major work, Pagan Races of the Malay Peninsula in 1906.

Because of his travels in the Malay interior, Skeat became too seriously ill to remain in the British Colonial Service, so he retired to London. In 1914, he became a lecturer at the British Museum.

== Death ==
Skeat retired in 1932 and died in London on 24 July 1953.

== Works ==
- Malay magic : being an introduction to the folklore and popular religion of the Malay Peninsula (1900)
- Pagan races of the Malay Peninsula (1906)
- The past at our doors : or, The old in the new around us /by Walter W. Skeat (1913)
