= Wendy Scase =

Wendy Scase is Emeritus Geoffrey Shepherd Professor of Medieval English Literature at the University of Birmingham. Her research interests include medieval manuscript production and use; histories of literacy; and relations between medieval literature and law, politics, and religion.

== Education & Career ==
Scase is a specialist in medieval English language and literature.

Scase began her academic career as an undergraduate in English and American Literature at the University of Kent. She then moved to Oxford where she took an MPhil in English Medieval Studies 1100–1500, followed by a DPhil. From 1987 to 1990 she held a British Academy Post-doctoral Fellowship (PDF) at the University of Oxford to study medieval religious and polemical literature.

Following completion of her PDF she took up a post lecturing in English at the University of Hull, where she founded the Hull Centre for Medieval Studies in 2008. In 1999 she took up the Geoffrey Shepherd chair in Medieval English Literature at the University of Birmingham.

She was director of the Vernon Manuscript Project (in collaboration with the Bodleian Library, Oxford), and the Electronic Catalogue of Vernacular Manuscript Books of the Medieval West Midlands project. She was also a partner in the Manuscripts Online project.

Scase is founding co-editor of New Medieval Literatures, with Rita Copeland (University of Pennsylvania) and David Lawton (Washington University in St. Louis). She was previously a general editor for the Medieval Texts and Cultures of Northern Europe book series published by Brepols. She served as a member of the editorial board of the journal Speculum.

Scase held a Leverhulme Trust Major Research Fellowship 2016–2019 for the project “Crafting English Letters: A Theory of Medieval Scribal Practice”.

Scase is an affiliate of the Angus McIntosh Centre for Historical Linguistics, University of Edinburgh. She is a key collaborator in the Early Modern Graphic Literacies Project, University of Turku.

== Select Bibliography ==
- 1989: Piers Plowman and the New Anticlericalism. Cambridge Studies in Medieval Literature 4. Cambridge University Press (repr. 2007)
- 2007: Literature and Complaint in England, 1272–1553. Oxford University Press
- 2007: (ed.) Essays in Manuscript Geography: Vernacular Manuscripts of the English West Midlands from the Conquest to the Sixteenth Century, Brepols
- 2010: Late Fourteenth-Century Poetry (Chaucer, Gower, Langland and their Legacy). In (ed. M. S. C. O’Neill) The Cambridge History of English Poetry. Cambridge University Press
- 2011: The Making of the Vernon Manuscript: The Production and Contexts of Oxford, Bodleian Library, MS Eng. poet.a.1, Early Book Society Texts and Transitions: Studies in the History of Manuscripts and Early Printed Books. Brepols
- 2012: (ed.) The Vernon Manuscript: A Facsimile Edition, Bodleian Digital Texts 3. Bodleian Library
- 2013: Latin Composition Lessons, Piers Plowman, and the Piers Plowman Tradition. In (eds. Frank Grady and Andrew Galloway) Answerable Style: The Idea of the Literary in Medieval England. Ohio State
- 2022: Visible English: Graphic Culture, Scribal Practice, and Identity, c. 700-1550. Utrecht Studies in Medieval Literacy 54. Brepols
