= The Monk's Tale =

Part of the Canterbury Tales

"The Monk's Tale" is one of the Canterbury Tales by Geoffrey Chaucer.

The Monk's tale to the other pilgrims is a collection of 17 short stories, exempla, on the theme of tragedy. The tragic endings of these historical figures are recounted: Lucifer, Adam, Samson, Hercules, Nebuchadnezzar, Belshazzar, Zenobia, Pedro of Castile, Peter I of Cyprus, Bernabò Visconti, Ugolino of Pisa, Nero, Holofernes, Antiochus, Alexander the Great, Julius Caesar, and Croesus.

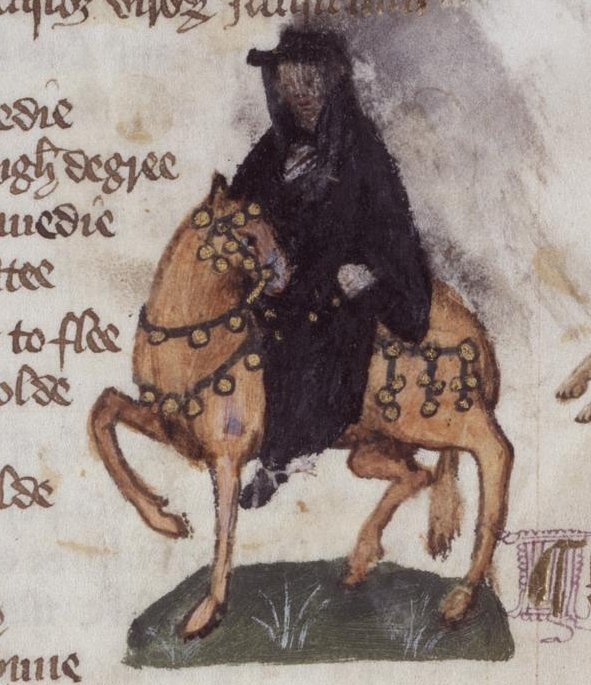
The Monk's Tale

Some literary critics believe that a large portion of the tale may have been written before the rest of the Canterbury Tales and that the four most contemporary figures were added at a later point. A likely dating for this hypothetical first draft of the text would be the 1370s, shortly after Chaucer returned from a trip to Italy, where he was exposed to Giovanni Boccaccio's Concerning the Falls of Illustrious Men, as well as other works such as the Decameron. The tragedy of Bernabò Visconti must have been written after 1385, the date of the protagonist's death. The basic structure for the tale is modeled after the Boccaccio's Illustrious Men, while the tale of Ugolino of Pisa is retold from Dante's Inferno.

The Monk, in his prologue, claims to have a hundred of these stories in his cell, but the Knight stops him after only 17, saying that they have had enough sadness. The order of the stories within the tale is different in several early manuscripts, and if the more contemporary stories were at the end of his tale, Chaucer may wish to suggest that the Knight has another motivation for interrupting than sheer boredom. In line 51 of the General Prologue, it is said of the Knight that: "At Alisaundre he was, whan it was wonne". If the Knight were at the capture of Alexandria, then the implication is that he was probably part of the crusade organised by Peter I of Cyprus and that the reader should presume that hearing of the tragedy of his former military commander is what prompts him to interrupt the monk.

== Themes ==
The form of tragedy depicted in "The Monk's Tale" is not that argued in Aristotle's Poetics, but rather "the medieval idea that the protagonist is victim rather than hero, raised up and then cast down by the workings of Fortune."

The text, despite the Monk's insistence upon a strict, homogeneous definition of tragedy, presents as equally tragic a series of tales that diverges considerably in content, tone, and form. For example, the structure and matter of the tales of Ugolino and Nero are, effectively, mirror images of one another. Chaucer's intention may be to have the Monk present his literary dogma and overly strict generic classifications in such a way that they appear to the reader to be unconvincing.

== Style ==
The metrical form of "The Monk's Tale" is the most complex of all the pilgrims', an eight-line stanza with rhyme scheme ABABBCBC. Usually, a strong, syntactical link exists between the fourth and fifth lines, which some literary theorists feel prevents the stanza from breaking in half. This metrical style gives an elevated, spacious tone to "The Monk's Tale" that is not always evidenced in the diction. In fact, the language is often simple and direct except in those instances of moralizing, whether discussing God or Fortune, when the vocabulary becomes weightier.

== See also ==
- God Spede the Plough
