= Jack Upland =

14th century polemical

Jack Upland or Jack up Lande (c. 1389–96?) is a polemical, probably Lollard, literary work which can be seen as a "sequel" to Piers Plowman, with Antichrist attacking Christians through corrupt confession. Jack asks a "flattering friar" (cf. Piers Plowman's "Friar Flatterer") nearly seventy questions attacking the mendicant orders and exposing their distance from scriptural truth.

Two extant works respond to Jack's questions: Responsiones ad Questiones LXV (before 1396) and Friar Daw's Reply (Digby 41, c. 1420). The latter text blasts John Wycliffe as one of history's major heretics. Responding to Friar Daw, an unknown author wrote Upland's Rejoinder, which survives in Digby 41, in the margins surrounding Friar Daw's Reply. Upland's Rejoinder intensifies the level of invective: Daw is said to recruit the young sons of true-living plowmen to become (paradoxically) "worldly beggars," apostates against true rule, and sodomites. Jack Upland was printed by itself in an octavo edition c. 1536–40 by John Gough (STC 5098). John Foxe's Acts and Monuments (1563, 1570) reprinted Jack Upland and attributed it to Geoffrey Chaucer. Thomas Speght's 1602 edition of Chaucer's Works (STC 5080) included Jack Upland. In 1968 P.L. Heyworth published all three works, Jack Upland, Friar Daw's Reply, and Upland's Rejoinder in an Oxford University Press edition..The three works also appear in the 1972 unpublished doctoral dissertation "The Origins of Subversive Literature in English," by John Roger Holdstock, for the University of California, Davis.

== See also ==
- Piers Plowman tradition
