= Thomas Speght =

English schoolmaster and editor

Thomas Speght (died 1621) was an English schoolmaster and editor of Geoffrey Chaucer.

== Life ==
He was from a Yorkshire family, and matriculated as a sizar of Peterhouse, Cambridge in 1566, graduating B.A. in 1570, and M.A. in 1573. At Cambridge he was supported by a scholarship from Lady Mildred Cecil. He went to London, and became a schoolmaster.

According to the epitaph on the tomb of his son Lawrence, Speght as schoolmaster was a "paragon".

== Works ==
In 1598 Speght edited the works of Chaucer. He had the assistance of John Stow the chronicler, and built on Stow's Chaucer edition of 1561. He included a glossary, and an influential biography of Chaucer, as well as annotations. He included works now not associated with Chaucer.

=== First Chaucer edition (1598) ===
The full title of his edition ran: The Workes of our Antient and learned English Poet, Geffrey Chaucer, newly Printed. In this Impression you shall find these Additions: (1) His Portraiture and Progenie Shewed. (2) His Life collected. (3) Argument to euery Booke gathered. (4) Old and Obscure Words explained. (5) Authors by him cited declared. (6) Difficulties opened. (7) Two Bookes of his neuer before printed (i.e. his Dreame and The Floure and the Leafe), published London, folio 1598.

The volume was dedicated to Sir Robert Cecil. Some copies were published by George Bishop, and others by Thomas Wight. A prefatory letter, addressed to the editor in 1597, by Francis Beaumont (d. 1624) of West Goscote, Leicestershire, supplied "a judicious apology for the supposed levities of Chaucer". Neither the Dreame nor The Floure and the Leafe is now thought to be connected to Chaucer.

=== Second Chaucer edition (1602) ===
Meanwhile Francis Thynne, whose father William Thynne had published a 1532 edition of Chaucer, was preparing notes for a commentary on the poet's works. On the publication of Speght's edition, Thynne abandoned his project and criticised Speght's performance in a long manuscript letter of Animadversions addressed to Speght and dedicated to Sir Thomas Egerton. The manuscript went to the Bridgwater library, was first printed in 1810 by Henry John Todd in his Illustrations of Gower and Chaucer (pp. 1–83), and was reprinted for the Early English Text Society in 1865 (new edit. 1875). When a reprint of Speght's edition of Chaucer was called for in 1602, he used Thynne's assistance, acknowledged in the preface, with also notes and corrections supplied by John Stow.

The second edition bore the title: The Workes of our Ancient and learned English Poet Geoffrey Chaucer newly printed. To that which was done in the former Impression thus much is now added: (1) In the life of Chaucer many things inserted. (2) The whole Worke by old Copies reformed. (3) Sentences and Prouerbes noted. (4) The Signification of the old and obscure words prooued. (5) The Latine and French not Englished by Chaucer translated. (6) The Treatise called Jacke Vpland against Friers: and Chaucer's A.B.C. called La Prière de nostre Dame, at this Impression added, published London, folio 1602.

The volume was again dedicated to Sir Robert Cecil. The Treatise called Jacke Vpland is not by Chaucer, but Chaucer's A B C is a genuine work. A later edition, with John Lydgate's Siege of Thebes, appeared in 1687.

=== Other works ===
Speght also contributed Latin commendatory verses to Abraham Fleming's Panoplie of Epistles (1576) and to John Baret's Alvearie (1580).

== Family ==
Speght married Anne, whose surname may have been Hill, and they had a family of at least 11, with three sons and eight daughters. They lived near Cripplegate, in a house by the chapel of St James in the Wall, where Speght taught. This house and school were surveyed in 1612 by Ralph Treswell, as the property belonged to the Clothworkers' Company.

Speght's son Laurence accompanied Sir Paul Pindar on his embassy to Constantinople, and was on 10 March 1639 granted in reversion the office of surveyor-general of the customs. He was buried at Clopton, Northamptonshire. Humfrey Dyson (died 1633) the book collector married one of the daughters.

Rachel Speght the poet, daughter of the Calvinist cleric James Speght, may have been a relation; James Speght, D.D., of Christ's College, Cambridge (son of John Speght of Horbury, Yorkshire), published in 1613 A briefe demonstration who have and of the certainty of their salvation that have the spirit of Christ. Thomas Speght's will mentions a brother James, who has been identified tentatively with the cleric.

== Notes ==
Attribution

This article incorporates text from a publication now in the public domain: Lee, Sidney, ed. (1898). "Speght, Thomas". Dictionary of National Biography. Vol. 53. London: Smith, Elder & Co.
