= Walter William Skeat =

British philologist (1835–1912)

The Reverend Walter William Skeat FBA
- Deacon
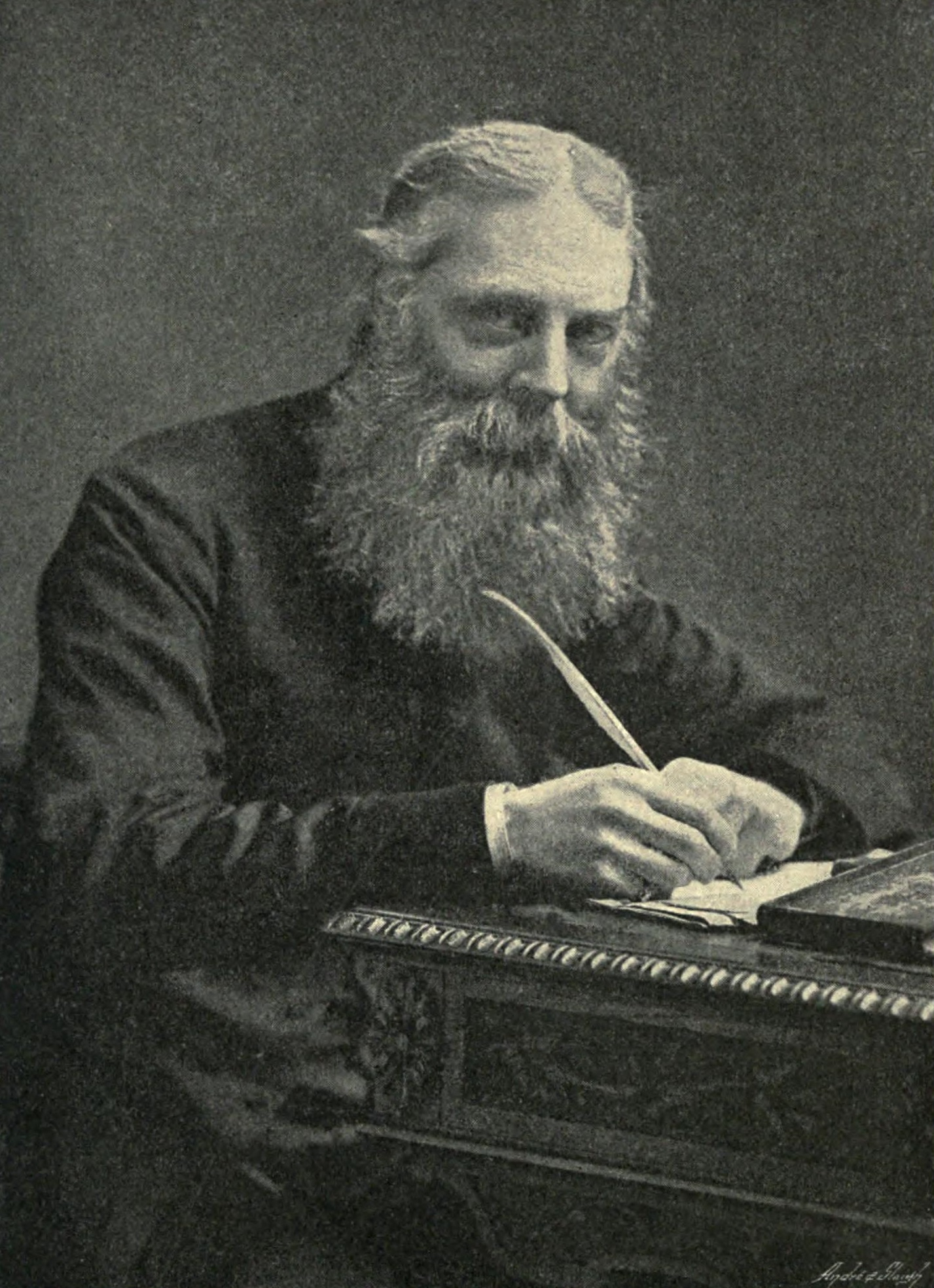
- Skeat at his writing desk, no later than 1895
- Church: Anglican
- Province: Canterbury
- Diocese: Ely

Personal details
- Born: 21 November 1835 London, England
- Died: 6 October 1912 (aged 76) Cambridge, England
- Spouse: Bertha Clara (m. 1860)
- Children: Bertha Marian Skeat; Walter William Skeat (Note: Skeat's anthropologist son has the same name as his father.)
- Education: Christ's College, Cambridge
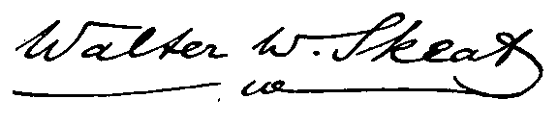
- Signature

Walter William Skeat FBA (21 November 1835 – 6 October 1912) was a British philologist and Anglican deacon. The pre-eminent British philologist of his time, he was instrumental in developing the English language as a higher education subject in the United Kingdom.

== Life ==
Skeat was born in London to architect William Skeat, of Perry Hill, Sydenham, later of Mount Street, Park Lane, City of Westminster, and his wife Sarah, daughter of Timothy Bluck. The Skeat family were a branch of an ancient Surrey family, and were resident in the parish of St George Hanover Square since the 1700s. He was educated at King's College School (Wimbledon), Highgate School, and Christ's College, Cambridge. He became a fellow at Christ's College in July 1860.

In 1860 Skeat was ordained an Anglican deacon and married Bertha Clara. In December 1860, he became a curate at East Dereham, where he served during 1861 and most of 1862. From 1862 to 1863, Skeat served as the curate at Godalming, Surrey. In October 1864, he returned to Cambridge University as a mathematics lecturer, a position he held until 1871.

Skeat soon developed an interest in the history of the English language. In 1870, Skeat and Henry Bradshaw collaborated on an edition of Geoffrey Chaucer for the University of Oxford. However, the project fell through when Bradshaw failed to keep his commitment. In 1894, Skeat published a six-volume edition of Chaucer; a supplementary volume, Chaucerian Pieces, was published in 1897.

In 1878 Skeat was elected the Elrington and Bosworth Professor of Anglo-Saxon at Cambridge. He completed Mitchell Kemble's edition of the Anglo-Saxon Gospels, and did work both in Old English and the Gothic language. Skeat is best known for his work in Middle English, and for his standard editions of Chaucer and William Langland's Piers Plowman.

Skeat was the founder and only president of the English Dialect Society from 1873 to 1896. The society's purpose was to collect materials for the publication of The English Dialect Dictionary. The society was dissolved in 1897.

Skeat is buried at the Ascension Parish Burial Ground in Cambridge.

Skeat's wife, Bertha Clara, born 6 February 1840, died 15 July 1924, is buried with him, as is a daughter Bertha Marian Skeat who was a writer and headmistress. His son was the anthropologist Walter William Skeat. His grandsons include the noted palaeographer T. C. Skeat and the stained glass painter Francis Skeat.

== Work ==
=== Etymology, lexicography, and toponymic studies ===
In pure philology, Skeat's principal achievement was his An Etymological Dictionary of the English Language (4 parts, 1879–1882; rev., and enlarged, 1910). While preparing the dictionary, he wrote hundreds of short articles on word origins for the London-based journal Notes and Queries.

Skeat also coined the term ghost word and was a leading expert in this subject. Skeat was also a pioneer of toponymy. His major publications in this field include:

- A Concise Dictionary of Middle English (1888), in conjunction with A. L. Mayhew
- "A Glossary of Tudor and Stuart Words" (1914) with A. L. Mayhew
- The place-names of Cambridgeshire (1901)
- Place-names of Huntingdonshire (1902)
- Place-names of Hertfordshire (1904)
- Place-names of Bedfordshire (1906)
- Place-names of Berkshire (1911)
- Place-names of Suffolk (1913)

=== Editions ===
- The Holy Gospels in Anglo-Saxon, Northumbrian, and Old Mercian Versions (1871)
- Chaucer's A Treatise on the Astrolabe (1872)
- Piers Plowman in three parallel texts (1886)
- The Complete Works of Geoffrey Chaucer (1894–97)

Skeat edited works for the Early English Text Society:

- Bruce of John Barbour
- Pierce the Ploughman's Crede
- Havelok the Dane
- William of Palerne

For the Scottish Text Society:

- Skeat edited The Kingis Quair,
- Skeat published an edition (2 vols., 1871) of Chatterton, with an investigation of the sources of the obsolete words used by Chatterton.
- Skeat published an edition of Chaucer in one volume for general readers
- Skeat published an edition of Chaucer's A Treatise on the Astrolabe, with an expert commentary.

Skeat produced what is still the main edition of Ælfric of Eynsham's Lives of the Saints; the edition includes translations which were largely the work of two women referred to as Mss Gunning and Wilkinson, who were credited in the preface to his edition.

=== Teaching ===
According to A. J. Wyatt, Skeat "was not a great teacher ... he left the teaching to those who had learned from him" – i.e. Wyatt himself and Israel Gollancz – "his teaching was episodic. Yet his lectures were eagerly followed by the fit though few; they were always interesting when least utilitarian, when he forgot examinations and syllabuses, and poured forth from the quaint storehouse of his motley memory things new and old."

Skeat's pedagogical works include:

- Specimens of English from 1394 to 1597 (1871)
- Specimens of Early English from 1298 to 1393 (1872), in conjunction with Richard Morris
- Principles of English Etymology (2 series, 1887 and 1891)
- A Student's Pastime (1896), a volume of essays
- The Chaucer Canon (1900)
- A Primer of Classical and English Philology (1905)

== International relations ==
Skeat was one of the very few scholars in English studies who had sufficient expertise to compete with the state-employed and tenured colleagues from German universities.

Like Henry Sweet, Skeat regarded Geoffrey Chaucer and other medieval English authors as part of his national heritage and objected to German scholars publishing works on them. At one point, Skeat exclaimed that even though he was "...to some extent disqualified, as being merely a native of London, in which city Chaucer himself was born," he should be able to contribute scholarship on Chaucer without perceived German interference.
