= William Layton (by 1514 – 1551 or 1552) =

English politician

William Layton (by 1514 – 1551 or 1552), of Harrow, Middlesex, was an English politician.

He was a Member (MP) of the Parliament of England for Lichfield in 1547.
