= William Langland =

Middle English poet (c. 1330 – c. 1386)

"Langland's Dreamer": from an illuminated initial in a Piers Plowman manuscript held at Corpus Christi College, Oxford

William Langland (/ˈlæŋlənd/; Latin: Willielmus de Langland; c. 1330 – c. 1386) is the presumed author of a work of Middle English alliterative verse generally known as Piers Plowman, an allegory with a complex variety of religious themes. The poem translated the language and concepts of the cloister into symbols and images that could be understood by a layman.

== Life ==
Little is known of Langland himself. It seems that he was born in the West Midlands of England around 1330, according to internal evidence in Piers Plowman. The narrator in Piers Plowman receives his first vision while sleeping in the Malvern Hills (between Herefordshire and Worcestershire), which suggests some connection to the area. The dialect of the poem is also consistent with this part of the country. Piers Plowman was written c. 1377, as the character's imagination says he has followed him for "five and forty winters."

A fifteenth-century note in the Dublin manuscript of Piers Plowman says that Langland was the son of Stacy de Rokayle.

Langland is believed to have been born in Cleobury Mortimer, Shropshire, although Ledbury, Herefordshire, and Great Malvern, Worcestershire also have strong claims to being his birthplace. There is a plaque to that effect in the porch of Cleobury Mortimer's parish church, which also contains a memorial window, placed in 1875, depicting the Piers Plowman vision. Langland is thought to have been a novice of Woodhouse Friary located nearby.

There are strong indications that Langland died in 1385 or 1386. A note written by "Iohan but" (John But) in a fourteenth-century manuscript of the poem (Rawlinson 137) makes direct reference to the death of its author: "whan this werke was wrouyt, ere Wille myte aspie/ Deth delt him a dent and drof him to the erthe/ And is closed vnder clom" ("once this work was made, before Will was aware/ Death struck him a blow and knocked him to the ground/ And now he is buried under the soil"). According to Edith Rickert, John But himself seems to have died in 1387, indicating that Langland died shortly before this date. Nonetheless some scholars believe Langland was the author of a 1399 work, Richard the Redeless.

Most of what is believed about Langland has been reconstructed from Piers Plowman. The C text of the poem contains a passage in which the narrator describes himself as a "loller" or "idler" living in the Cornhill area of London, and refers to his wife and child, who are respectively named Katherine and Nicolette. It also suggests that he was well above average height and made a living reciting prayers for the dead in chantries at St Paul's Cathedral. However, the distinction between allegory and reality in Piers Plowman is blurred, and the entire passage, as Wendy Scase observes, is reminiscent of the false confession tradition in medieval literature (also seen in the Confessio Goliae and in Jean de Meun's Roman de la Rose).

A similar passage in the final Passus of the B and C texts provides further ambiguous details on the poet's wife and his torments by Elde (Old Age), including baldness, gout, and impotence. This may indicate that the poet had reached middle age by the 1370s, but the accuracy of the passage is called into question by the conventional nature of the description (see, for instance, Walter Kennedy's "In Praise of Aige" and The Parliament of the Three Ages) and the fact that it occurs near the end of the poem, when Will's personal development is reaching its logical conclusion.

The detailed and highly sophisticated religious knowledge displayed in the poem indicates that Langland had some connection to the clergy, but the nature of this relationship is uncertain. The poem shows no obvious bias towards any particular group or order of churchmen, but is even-handed in its anticlericalism. This makes it difficult to align Langland with any specific order. He is probably best regarded, John Bowers writes, as a member of "that sizable group of unbeneficed clerks who formed the radical fringe of contemporary society ... the poorly shod Will is portrayed 'y-robed in russet' traveling about the countryside, a crazed dissident showing no respect to his superiors". Malcolm Godden has proposed that he lived as an itinerant hermit, attaching himself to a patron temporarily and exchanging writing services for shelter and food.

Robert Crowley's 1550 edition of Piers Plowman promoted the idea that Langland was a follower of John Wycliffe. However, this conclusion is challenged by early Lollard appropriation of the Plowman figure (see, for instance, Pierce the Ploughman's Crede and The Plowman's Tale). It is true that Langland and Wycliffe shared many concerns: Both questioned the value of indulgences and pilgrimages, promoted the use of the vernacular in preaching, attacked clerical corruption, and even advocated disendowment. However, these topics were widely discussed throughout the late 14th century and were not specifically associated with Wycliffe until after the presumed time of Langland's death. Also, as Pamela Gradon observes, at no point does Langland echo Wycliffe's characteristic teachings on the sacraments.

== Attribution ==
The attribution of Piers Plowman to Langland rests principally on the evidence of a manuscript held at Trinity College, Dublin (MS 212). This manuscript ascribes Piers Plowman to Willielmi de Langland, son of Stacy de Rokayle, "who died in Shipton-under-Wychwood, a tenant of the Lord Spenser in the county of Oxfordshire". Other manuscripts name the author as Robert or William Langland, or Wilhelms W. (most likely shorthand for William of Wychwood).

The poem itself also seems to point to Langland's authorship. At one point, the narrator remarks: "I have lived in londe [...] my name is longe wille" (B XV.152). This can be taken as a coded reference to the poet's name, in the style of much late-medieval literature (see, for instance, Villon's acrostics in Le Testament). However, it has also been suggested that medieval scribes and readers may have understood this line as referring to a "William Longwille", the pseudonym used by a Norfolk rebel in 1381.

Although there is little other evidence, Langland's authorship has been widely accepted since the 1920s. It is not, however, entirely beyond dispute, as 21st century work by Stella Pates and C. David Benson has demonstrated.

== See also ==
- Pearl Poet
- Piers Plowman

== Sources ==
- John M. Bowers, "Piers Plowman and the Police: notes towards a history of the Wycliffite Langland," Yearbook of Langland Studies 6 (1992), pp. 1–50.
- Malcolm Gradon, The Making of Piers Plowman (London: Longman, 1990). ISBN 0-582-01685-1
- Edith Rickert, "John But, Messenger and Maker," Modern Philology 11 (1903), pp. 107–17.
- Wendy Scase, Piers Plowman and the New Anticlericalism (Cambridge: Cambridge University Press, 1989). ISBN 0-521-36017-X.
