= Piers Plowman =

Middle English poem by William Langland

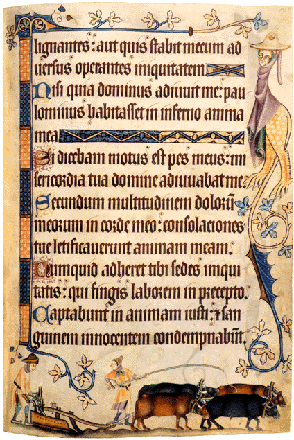
Page from the 14th-century Luttrell Psalter, showing drolleries on the right margin and a ploughman at the bottom

Piers Plowman (written c. 1370–86; possibly c. 1377) or Visio Willelmi de Petro Ploughman (William's Vision of Piers Plowman) is a Middle English allegorical narrative poem by William Langland. It is written in unrhymed, alliterative verse divided into sections called passus (Latin for "step").

Like the Pearl Poet's Sir Gawain and the Green Knight, Piers Plowman is considered by many critics to be one of the greatest works of English literature of the Middle Ages, preceding and even influencing Chaucer's Canterbury Tales. Piers Plowman contains the first known reference to a literary tradition of Robin Hood tales.

Three distinct versions of the poem exist, which scholars refer to as the A-, B-, and C-texts. The B-text is the most widely edited and translated version; it revises and extends the A-text by over 4000 lines.

Also, a Z-text of Piers Plowman, discovered in the 1980s, is composed of elements from the A and C versions. The Z-text is not distinctly authorial (critics have suggested it may be of scribal production), thus its authorship is greatly contested.

== Summary ==
The poem, a mix of theological allegory and social satire, concerns the narrator/dreamer's quest for the true Christian life in the context of medieval Catholicism. This journey takes place within a series of dream visions; the dreamer seeks, among other things, the allegorical characters Dowel ("Do-Well"), Dobet ("Do-Better"), and Dobest ("Do-Best"). The poem is divided into passus ('steps'), the divisions between which vary by version.

The following summary is based on the B-version of the poem.

=== Vision 1 ===
Prologue: The poem begins in the Malvern Hills between Worcestershire and Herefordshire. A man named Will (which can be understood either simply as a personal name or as an allegory for a person's will, in the sense of 'desire, intention') falls asleep and has a vision of a tower set upon a hill and a fortress (donjon) in a deep valley; between these symbols of heaven and hell is a 'fair field full of folk', representing the world of humankind. A satirical account of different sections of society follows, along with a dream-like fable representing the King as a cat and his people as rodents who consider whether to bell the cat.

Passus 1: Holy Church visits Will and explains the tower of Truth, and discusses Truth more generally.

Passus 2: Will sees Lady Mede ('payment') and finds out about her planned marriage to False.

Passus 3: Lady Mede travels to the royal court; the King proposes she marry Conscience; but Conscience denounces her.

Passus 4: Conscience and Reason convince the King not to marry Mede to False. Will wakes up.

=== Vision 2 ===
Passus 5: Will falls back to sleep. Reason gives a sermon to the Field of Folk and the people decide to repent. The Seven Deadly Sins make confession and in penance attempt to go on pilgrimage to St Truth. They get lost, and Piers Plowman makes his first appearance: he will help the penitents if they help him plough his half-acre.

Passus 6: Piers and the penitents plough the half-acre. Some people refuse to work, and Hunger punishes them until they work. But once Hunger has been sated, the people return to idleness.

Passus 7: Eventually, Truth sends Piers a pardon for the penitents' sins; its main content is 'Do well and have well and God shall have your soul' and 'Do evil and have evil, and expect nothing other than that after your death, the Devil shall have your soul'. When challenged on the pardon's validity by a priest, Piers angrily tears it in two. Will is awakened by their arguing and, musing on his dreams, decides to seek ‘Do-wel’.

=== Vision 3 ===
Passus 8: Will's search for Dowel begins. He enters into a disputation with Friars. He then falls asleep once more and meets Thought. Thought instructs Will in 'Do well, do better, do best'. Practical interpretation of what these concepts mean is to be provided by Wit.

Passus 9: There is an extended allegory featuring Dowel and the Castle of Flesh, exposing the need for people to be governed by their 'Inwit'. The text discusses poverty and marriage. Wit makes further inroads to understanding Dowel, as active virtue.

Passus 10: Will meets Wit's wife, Dame Study. She complains to Will about his ignorance. Will then proceeds to Clergy and Scripture to learn more about Dowel. He considers what use scholarship might have in helping him achieve salvation.

Passus 11: Scripture complains about Will's lack of self-knowledge. Angered, Will (who is already dreaming) goes to sleep and has a dream-within-a-dream in which he meets Fortune. He serves her into old age, but she abandons him. Will learns about the salvation of the Emperor Trajan and the power of love. Kynde ('character, natural disposition, nature', here understood as an aspect of God) shows Will the world. Will has an argument with Reason: Reason, Will concludes, does not do enough to keep people from sin; but Reason disagrees. Will awakes from the dream-within-a-dream. He now meets Imaginatif, who advises Will to be patient.

Passus 12: Imaginatif teaches Will, bringing together and improving his understanding of earlier discussions in the poem. Imaginatif emphasises the need for humility and the importance of Grace.

=== Vision 4 ===
Passus 13: Will awakens and then falls back to sleep; he dreams of sharing a feast with Conscience, Scripture, Clergy and Patience; he encounters a greedy Doctor of Divinity (who later shows disdain for love) and as well as eating actual food also dines on spiritual food. Piers the Plowman offers a definition of Do Well, Do Better and Do Best. Then Conscience and Patience meet Haukyn the Active Man, who wears a coat of Christian faith which is, however, soiled with the Seven Deadly Sins.

Passus 14: Conscience teaches Haukyn to seek forgiveness and do penance; Patience teaches Haukyn about the merits of embracing poverty. Haukyn cries out for God's mercy, which awakens Will.

=== Vision 5 ===
Passus 15: Will finds himself alienated from the waking world, but Reason helps him to go back to sleep, whereupon Will meets Anima ('spirit'). Anima tells Will off for his pride in wanting to know too much, but goes on to talk about charity, in particular how the Church should care for its flock, but how its priests and monks do not always fulfil this duty. Talking to Anima, Will starts to conclude that Piers the Plowman is Christ. Will realises that he needs to switch from searching for Dowel to searching for Charity.

Passus 16: Will falls into another dream-within-a-dream, this time about the Tree of Charity, whose gardener is Piers the Plowman. Will participates in a re-enactment of the Fall of Man and then has a vision of the life of Christ; when this reaches the point where the Devil is defeated, Will wakes up from the dream-within-a-dream. Will goes looking for Piers and meets Faith/Abraham, who is himself searching for Christ.

Passus 17: Next, Will meets Hope/Moses, characterised by the tablets of law, who is also in search of Christ. Will learns about the Good Samaritan, the prospect of salvation, and the importance of Love. He wakes up.

=== Vision 6 ===
Passus 18: Will sleeps again, and experiences the climactic section of Piers Plowman. He experiences Love and the intersection of human and divine time. Will witnesses Christ/the Good Samaritan/Piers Plowman riding into Jerusalem and Christ's crucifixion. He then witnesses the Four Daughters of God (Truth, Justice, Mercy, Peace) in debate; the Harrowing of Hell; and Redemption.

Will wakes again, and now exhorts his family to hear Mass.

=== Vision 7 ===
Passus 19: During the mass, Will falls back to sleep and meets Conscience once more. Conscience recounts the life and Passion of Christ and how Piers/Peter was given his power by Grace/Christ. Will finds out about Pentecost; once more sees Piers as a ploughman, and witnesses Pride attacking Unity/Holy Church. He wakes up and records his dream.

=== Vision 8 ===
Passus 20: While awake, Will meets Need. He falls asleep again and now dreams of the Antichrist. Kynde sends Old Age, Death, and Pestilence, to chastise people: Will is attacked by Old Age. He witnesses Holy Church undermined by a hypocritical Friar. Conscience goes on pilgrimage to seek Piers the Plowman, and calls on Grace for help—whereupon Will wakes up.

== Title and authorship ==
It is now commonly accepted that Piers Plowman was written by William Langland, about whom little is known. This attribution rests principally on the evidence of an early-fifteenth-century manuscript of the C-text (see below) of Piers held at Trinity College, Dublin (MS 212), which ascribes the work to one man, called 'Willielmus de Langlond':

Memorandum quod Stacy de Rokayle pater willielmi de Langlond qui stacius fuit generosus & morabatur in Schiptoun vnder whicwode tenens domini le Spenser in comitatu Oxoniensi qui predictus willielmus fecit librum qui vocatur Perys ploughman.

Translation:

It should be noted that Stacy de Rokayle was the father of William de Langlond; this Stacy was born and dwelt in Shipton-under-Wychwood, a tenant of the Lord Spenser in the county of Oxfordshire. The aforesaid William made the book which is called Piers Plowman.

Other manuscripts also name the author as "Robert or William Langland", or "Wilhelmus W." (which could be shorthand for "William of Wychwood").

The attribution to William Langland is also based on internal evidence, primarily a seemingly autobiographical section in Passus 5 of the C-text of the poem. The main narrator of the poem in all the versions is named Will, with allegorical resonances clearly intended, and Langland (or Longland) is thought to be indicated as a surname through apparent puns; e.g., at one point the narrator remarks: "I have lyved in londe... my name is longe wille" (B.XV.152). This could be a coded reference to the poet's name, in the style of much late-medieval literature. New evidence suggests that this reverse cryptogram was read as "Will Long Will" by contemporary scribes and that the rebels of 1381 used this name as a pseudonym alongside the name "Piers Plowman". Langland's authorship, however, is not entirely beyond dispute, as recent work by Stella Pates and C. David Benson has demonstrated. In their work, "The Langland Myth", they claim there is not enough evidence to suggest that Langland is, in fact, the author, but instead that it is the work of a man by the name of William de la Rokele.

In the sixteenth century, when Piers was first printed, authorship was attributed by various antiquarians (such as John Bale) and poets to John Wycliffe and Geoffrey Chaucer, amongst others. Some sixteenth- and seventeenth-century persons regarded the poem as anonymous, and/or associated it with texts in the plowman tradition of social complaint, particularly the Chaucerian pseudepigrapha The Ploughman's Tale and Pierce the Ploughman's Crede. (The latter was appended to Owen Rogers' 1560 edition of Piers Plowman, a degraded version of Robert Crowley's 1550 editions.) The character of Piers himself had come to be considered by many readers to be in some sense the author.

The first printed editions by Crowley named the author as "Robert Langland" in a prefatory note. Langland is described as a probable protégé of Wycliffe. With Crowley's editions, the poem followed an existing and subsequently repeated convention of titling the poem The Vision of Piers [or Pierce] Plowman, which is in fact the conventional name of just one section of the poem.

Some medievalists and text critics, beginning with John Matthews Manly, have posited multiple authorship theories for Piers, an idea which continues to have a periodic resurgence in the scholarly literature. Between two and five authors are suggested, depending on how authorship is defined. Also, scholars like Charlotte Brewer suggest that scribes and their supervisors be regarded as editors with semi-authorial roles in the production of early modern texts like Piers Ploughman.

== The text ==
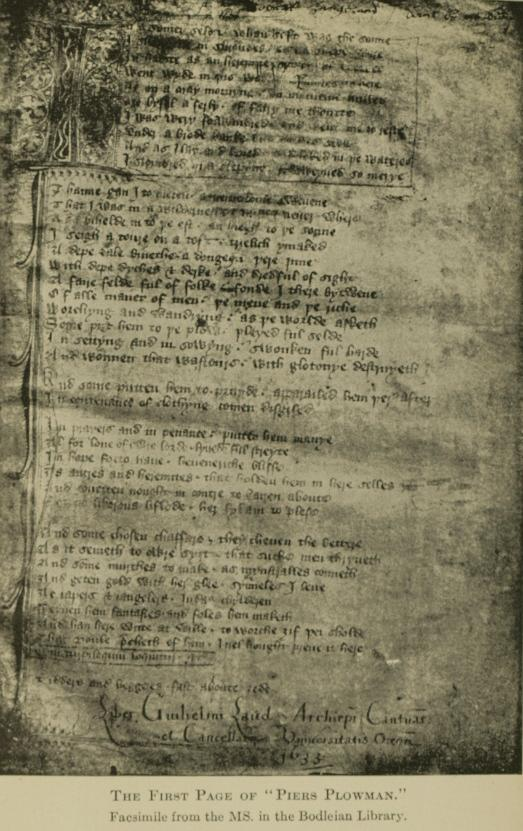
Image of the opening of Piers Plowman from manuscript Laud misc. 581 in the Bodleian Library

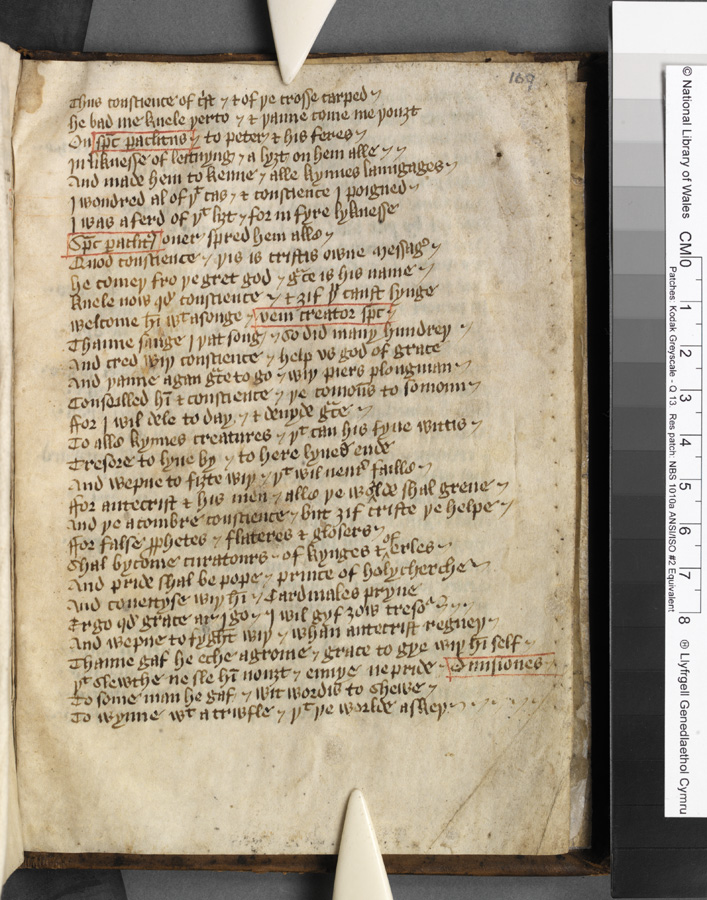
Piers Plowman from the early-15th century manuscript in the National Library of Wales

Piers Plowman is considered to be one of the most analytically challenging texts in Middle English textual criticism. There are 50–56 surviving manuscripts, some of which are fragmentary. None of the texts is known to be in the author's own hand, and none of them derive directly from any of the others.

All modern discussion of the text revolves around the classifications of W. W. Skeat. Skeat argued that there are as many as ten forms of the poem, but only three are to be considered authoritative—the A, B, and C-texts—although the definition of "authoritative" in this context is problematic. According to the three-versions hypothesis, each version represents different manuscript traditions deriving from three distinct and successive stages of authorial revision. Although precise dating is debated, the A, B, and C texts are now commonly thought of as the progressive (20–25 years) work of a single author.

According to the three-versions hypothesis, the A-text was written c. 1367–70 and is the earliest. It breaks off, apparently unfinished, at Book 11, and Book 12 is written by another author or interpolator. The poem runs to about 2,500 lines. The B-text (Warner's ur-B text) was written c. 1377–79; it revises A, adds new material, and is three times the length of A. It runs to about 7,300 lines. The C-text was written in the 1380s as a major revision of B except for the final sections.

There is some debate over whether the poem can be regarded as finished or not. It entails additions, omissions, and transpositions; it is not significantly different in size from B. Some scholars see it as a conservative revision of B that aims at disassociating the poem from Lollardy and the religious and political radicalism of John Ball during the Great Rising of 1381. (Ball appropriated Piers and other characters in the poem for his own verses, speeches, and letters during the Rising.) There is little actual evidence for this proposal, and much against it.

Skeat believed that the A-text was incomplete and based his editions on a B-text manuscript (Oxford, MS. Laud Misc. 581) that he wrongly thought was probably a holograph. Modern editors following Skeat, such as George Kane and E. Talbot Donaldson, have maintained the basic tenets of Skeat's work: there were three final authorial texts, now lost, that can be reconstructed, albeit imperfectly and without certainty, by rooting out the "corruption" and "damage" done by scribes.

The Kane, Kane-Donaldson, and Russell-Kane editions of the three versions, published by the Athlone Press, have been controversial, but are considered among the most important accomplishments in modern editorial work and theory in Middle English. A. V. C. Schmidt has also published a parallel edition of A, B, C and Z; the second volume containing a full critical apparatus indicating his editorial decisions was finally published in 2008, long after the first volume fell out of print.

A. G. Rigg and Charlotte Brewer hypothesized the existence of a Z-text predecessor to A which contains elements of both A and C. The Z-text is based on Oxford MS. Bodley 851, which Rigg and Brewer edited and published. It is the shortest version, and its authenticity is disputed. Ralph Hanna III has disputed the Rigg/Brewer approach based on codicological evidence and internal literary evidence; consequently, the Z-text is now more commonly viewed as a scribal corruption of A with C elements. More recently, Lawrence Warner has shown that what was thought of as B in fact incorporates matter produced as part of the C-revision: if B circulated before C, it looked nothing like what previous editors had assumed.

== Editorial, publication and reception history ==
=== 14th–15th centuries ===
John Ball, a priest involved as a leader in the Great Rising of 1381 (also known as the Peasants' Revolt), included Piers and other characters in his writings. If Piers Plowman already had perceived associations with Lollardy, Ball's appropriations from it (assuming he was not referring to a folk character also appropriated by Langland) enhanced his and its association with the Lollards as well. The real beliefs and sympathies at work in Langland's poem and the revolt remain, for this reason, mysterious and debatable. New evidence suggests that in Norfolk the rebels of 1381 had access to the B version of the text and that they used the author-persona's name - Will Long Will - as a pseudonym.

No doubt because of Ball's writings, the Dieulacres Abbey Chronicle account of the revolt refers to Piers, seemingly as a real person who was a leader with Ball in the revolt. Similarly, early in the history of the poem's dissemination in manuscript form, Piers is often treated as the author of the poem. Since it is hard to see how this is credible to those who read the poem, perhaps the idea was that Piers was a mask for the author. Or, as the ideal character of the poem, Piers might be seen as a kind of alter-ego for the poet that was more important to his early readers than the obviously authorial narrator and his apparent self-disclosures as Will. Ironically, Will's name and identity were substantially lost.

In some contemporary chronicles of the Rising, Ball and the Lollards were blamed for the revolt, and Piers began to be associated with heresy and rebellion. The earliest literary works of the Piers Plowman tradition follow in the wake of these events, although they and their sixteenth-century successors are not anti-monarchical or supportive of rebellion. Like William Langland, who may have written the C-text version of Piers Plowman to disassociate himself from the Rising, they look for the reform of the English church and society by the removal of abuses in what the authors deem a restorative rather than an innovative project.

The first recorded owner of a copy of Piers Plowman was the Irish judge Walter de Brugge, who died in 1396.

=== 16th–18th centuries ===
The most conspicuous omissions from William Caxton's press were the Bible and Piers Plowman. Robert Crowley's 1550 editions of Piers Plowman present the poem as a proto-Protestant goad to the reformation of religion and society. In the passus summaries in the second and third editions, Crowley emphasizes material in the poem warning of political instability and widespread corruption when the king is a child (as was then the case). Crowley may have made small attempts to remove or soften single references to transubstantiation, the Mass, purgatory, and the Virgin Mary as a mediator and object of devotion (although almost a dozen references to purgatory remain, as well as three significant references to Mary). He actually added a line to his second and third editions that clearly refers to Marian intercession (F1r).

After 1550, it was not printed again until 1813 except for Owen Rogers' 1561 edition—an inexpensive imitation Crowley's text. The few people who mention Piers Plowman before 1700 usually attribute it to someone other than Langland, and often it is unclear whether they are referring to Langland's poem or one of the many other texts circulating in print as part of the Piers Plowman tradition, particularly The Ploughman's Tale. Since Piers was conflated with the author and dreamer-narrator of the poem at an early date, "Piers Plowman" or a Latin equivalent is often given as the name of the author, which indicates unfamiliarity with, or disbelief of, Crowley's preface.

When Langland's poem is mentioned, it is often disparaged for its barbarous language. Similar charges were made against Chaucer, but he had more defenders and was already well established as a historical figure and "authority." Despite the work of Bale and Crowley, Langland's name appears to have remained unknown or unaccepted since other authors were suggested after Crowley's editions. Sometimes "Piers Plowman" was referred to as the author of the poem, and when writers refer to a list of medieval authors, they will often mention "Piers Plowman" as an author's name or a substitute for one. One gets the overall impression that Langland and Piers Plowman had less existence as author and text than did the fictional figure of Piers, whose relationship to a definite authorial and textual origin had been obscured much earlier.

Samuel Pepys owned a copy of Piers Plowman. Milton cites "Chaucer's Ploughman" in "Of Reformation" (1641) when he is discussing poems that have described Constantine as a major contributor to the corruption of the church. The end of Piers Plowman, Passus 15, makes this point at length—but it is also made briefly in one stanza in The Ploughman's Tale (ll. 693–700). In "An Apology for a Pamphlet ..." Milton refers to The Vision and Crede of Pierce Ploughman, which might mean one or both of these texts. Perhaps it refers to Rogers' 1561 edition which put them together. Henry Selden (1622) appears to have read the poem closely enough to admire it for its criticism of the church as well as its judgment and invention. John Weever (1631) also names Robert Langland, as does David Buchanan (1652). Buchanan, however, makes Langland a Scot and attributes other works to him aside from Piers Plowman.

Thomas Fuller (1662) bases his remarks about Langland on Selden and Bale, emphasizing Langland's putative proto-Protestant status. Fuller also notes that The Praier and Complaynte of the Ploweman unto Christe was "first set forth by Tindal, since, exemplified by Mr. Fox." Since the language of this text is similar to that of Piers Plowman, Fuller attributes it to Langland as well. Thomas Dudley, father of Anne Dudley Bradstreet (1612–72), brought a copy of Crowley's Piers Plowman to America. Alexander Pope (1688–1744) owned a copy of Rogers' reprint of Crowley's edition of Piers Plowman with the Crede appended, and Isaac D'Israeli (1766–1848) wrote in his Amenities of Literature that Pope had "very carefully analyzed the whole" of the latter text. D'Israeli also mentions Lord Byron's (1788–1824) praise for Piers Plowman.

=== 19th–21st centuries ===
With its old language and alien worldview, Piers Plowman fell into obscurity until the nineteenth century. Barring Rogers, after Crowley, the poem was not published in its entirety until Thomas Whitaker's 1813 edition. It emerged at a time when amateur philologists began the groundwork of what would later become a recognized scholarly discipline. Whitaker's edition was based on a C-text, whereas Crowley used a B-text for his base.

With Whitaker, a modern editorial tradition began, with each new editor striving to present the "authentic" Piers Plowman and challenging the accuracy and authenticity of preceding editors and editions. Then, as before in the English Reformation, this project was driven by a need for a national identity and history that addressed present concerns, hence analysis and commentary typically reflected the critic's political views. In the hands of Frederick Furnivall and W. W. Skeat, Piers Plowman could be, respectively, a consciousness-raising text in the Working Man's College or a patriotic text for grammar school pupils. Piers Plowman has often been read primarily as a political document. In an 1894 study, J. J. Jusserand was primarily concerned with what he saw as the poem's psychological and sociopolitical content—as distinct from the aesthetic or literary—in a dichotomy common to all modern humanistic studies.

In "Le temps des laboureurs. Travail, ordre social et croissance en Europe (XIe-XIVe siècle)" (Albin Michel 2012) historian of medieval labour Mathieu Arnoux devotes particular attention to "Piers Plowman" in a breakthrough attempt to identify theological causes for the growth of agricultural production from the 11th century to the 14th century.

According to the historian Christopher Dawson, the poem represents “a precious and almost unique record” of medieval religious culture in the minds of the masses as opposed to that of the courts or of the schools and universities. Langland’s poem “is a voice from the underworld of the common people, speaking their language, using their imagery and sharing their ideals”.

== Related texts ==
Many subsequent texts – at least 14 – use characters from Piers Plowman, most often Piers himself. Many more texts were written with similar themes and characters, though not directly borrowing from Piers Plowman, until around the end of the 16th century. Conversely, Piers Plowman was preceded by and contemporary with a number of similar works in the 14th and 15th centuries. Together, these are referred to as the "Piers Plowman tradition".

== Editions ==
- Kane, George, gen. ed. Piers Plowman: The A Version (Kane, ed.; rev. ed. London: Athlone, 1988); Piers Plowman: The B Version (Kane and Donaldson, eds.; rev. ed. London: Athlone, 1988); Piers Plowman: The C Version (George Russell and Kane, eds.; London: Athlone, 1997).
- Pearsall, Derek, ed. William Langland. Piers Plowman: A New Annotated Edition of the C-Text (Exeter, UK: University of Exeter Press, 2008) (Exeter Medieval Texts and Studies).
- Schmidt, A. V. C., Piers Plowman: A Parallel-Text Edition of the A, B, C, and Z Versions (3 vols.; Kalamazoo: Medieval Institute, 2011).
- Vaughan, Míċeál F., Piers Plowman: The A Version (Baltimore: Johns Hopkins University Press, 2011).

== Modernizations ==
- Donaldson, E. Talbot, Piers Plowman: the Donaldson translation (Norton Critical Editions, new ed. 2006).
- Economou, George, William Langland's Piers Plowman: The C version (Philadelphia: University of Pennsylvania Press, 1996).
- Peter Sutton, Piers Plowman: A Modern Verse Translation (Jefferson, NC: McFarland, 2014) ISBN 978-0786495030
- Calabrese, Michael (2020). Piers Plowman : the A version. Washington, D.C.: The Catholic University of America Press. ISBN 9780813233437.

== Adaptations ==
In 2017, a UK theatre production of the poem was developed by Tom Chivers, under the moniker 'Fair Field'. It included an exhibition at the National Poetry Library and a series of podcasts published by the Guardian.

In 2023, Eloise Peniston adapted and directed a Middle English performance of the Trinity B Text at St Edmund Hall. ‘

== See also ==
- Allegory in the Middle Ages
- Plowboy trope
