= List of subjects and tales in Confessio Amantis =

This index is based on Macaulay's marginal notations, which are a running analysis of the contents of the Confessio Amantis, a 33,000-line Middle English poem by John Gower. These have been used for subdivisions of the work in order to break it into smaller, more usable units and to serve as a very rough index of contents.

Some changes from the Harvard version have been made for Wikipedia purposes.

- links to the Wikipedia version of Gower's stories have been added.
- spelling of names follows Gower rather than modern usage. (This facilitates searching within CA.)

== Prologue ==
- Design of the Book; Dedication Pro.1-92
- Temporal Rulers Pro.93-192
- The Church Pro.193-498
- The Commons; Man the cause of Evil Pro.499-584
- Nebuchadnezzar's Dream; The Empires of the World; The latest Time Pro.585-848
- Division the Cause of Evil Pro.848-1088

== Book I ==
- Love rules the world; example of the author Bk1.1-92
- Author's woful Case; His Complaint to Cupid and Venus; The Fiery Dart; Venus Queen of Love; Genius, the priest of Love Bk1.93-202
- The Lover's Shrift Bk1.203-288
- The Five Senses; Seeing Bk1.289-332
- Tale of Acteon Bk1.333-388.
- The Tale of Medusa Bk1.389-435
- Hearing; Prudence of the Serpent Bk1.436-480
- Tale of the Sirens Bk1.481-529
- The Sins of the Eye and Ear Bk1.530-574
- The Seven deadly Sins; Pride; Five Ministers of Pride; i. Hypocrisy; Hypocrisy of Lovers Bk1.575-760
- Tale of Mundus and Paulina Bk1.761-1076
- The Trojan horse Bk1.1077-1189
- Hypocrisy in Love Bk1.1190-1234
- Inobedience Bk1.1235-1342
- Murmur and Complaint Bk1.1343-1406
- Tale of Florent Bk1.1407-1882
- Surquidry or Presumption Bk1.1883-1976
- Tale of Capaneus Bk1.1977-2020
- The Trump of Death Bk1.2021-2274
- Tale of Narcissus Bk1.2275-2358
- Presumption of Lovers Bk1.2359-2398
- Avantance or Boasting Bk1.2399-2458
- Tale of Albinus and Rosemund Bk1.2459-2680
- Vain-glory Bk1.2681-2717
- The Lover's Confession Bk1.2718-2784
- Nabugodonosor's Punishment Bk1.2785-3042
- Humility Bk1.3043-3066
- Tale of the Three Questions Bk1.3067-3402
- Humility Bk1.3403-3446

== Book II ==
- Envy; Sorrow for another man's Joy Bk2.1-96
- Tale of Acis and Galatea Bk2.97-220
- Joy for another man's Grief Bk2.221-290
- The Travellers and the Angel (Greed and Jealousy) Bk2.291-382
- Detraction; Detraction of Lovers Bk2.383-586
- Tale of Constance Bk2.587-1612
- Demetrius and Perseus Bk2.1613-1878
- False-Semblant Bk2.1879-2144
- Deianire and Nessus Bk2.2145-2326
- Supplantation Bk2.2327-2458
- Geta and Amphitrion Bk2.2459-2500
- Tale of the False Bachelor Bk2.2501-2802
- Pope Boniface Bk2.2803-3049
- Joab and Ahitophel Bk2.3085-3094
- Nature of Envy Bk2.3095-3161
- Charity and Pity Bk2.3162-3186
- The Tale of Constantine and Sylvester Bk2.3187-3530

== Book III ==
- Ire or Wrath; Melancholy Bk3.1-142
- Tale of Canace and Machaire Bk3.143-360
- Tiresias and the Snakes Bk3.361-394
- Melancholy Bk3.395-416
- Cheste Bk3.417-638
- Patience of Socrates Bk3.639-730
- Jupiter, Juno, and Tiresias Bk3.731-767
- Cheste Bk3.768-782
- Phebus and Cornide Bk3.783-817
- Jupiter and Laar Bk3.818-842
- Hate Bk3.843-972
- King Namplus and the Greeks Bk3.973-1088
- Contek and Homicide; Contek within the Heart Bk3.1089-1200
- Tale of Diogenes and Alexander; Bk3.1201-1311
- Contek Bk3.1312-1330
- Pyramus and Thisbe Bk3.1331-1494
- The Lover's Confession; Danger; More haste worse than speed Bk3.1495-1684
- Tale of Phebus and Daphne Bk3.1685-1728
- Fool-haste Bk3.1729-1756
- Athemas and Demephon Bk3.1757-1884
- Tale of Orestes Bk3.1885-2200
- Lawful Homicide Bk3.2201-2250
- Evil of War Bk3.2251-2362
- Alexander and the Pirate Bk3.2363-2438
- Wars and Death of Alexander Bk3.2439-2484
- Are Crusades Lawful? Guilt of Homicide; Bk3.2485-2558
- Peleus Bk3.2547-2557
- A Strange Bird; Mercy Bk3.2559-2638
- Tale of Telaphus and Teucer Bk3.2639-2774

== Book IV ==
- Sloth; Lachesse Bk4.1-76
- Eneas and Dido Bk4.77-146
- Ulixes and Penolope Bk4.147-233
- Grossteste Bk4.234-243
- The Foolish Virgins Bk4.254-260
- Lachesse Bk4.261-312
- Pusillanimity Bk4.313-370
- Pymaleon and the Statue Bk4.371-450
- Tale of Iphis Bk4.451-538
- Forgetfulness Bk4.539-730
- Demephon and Phillis Bk4.731-886
- Negligence Bk4.887-978
- Tale of Phebus Bk4.979-1034
- Tale of Icarus Bk4.1035-1082
- Idleness Bk4.1083-1244
- Tale of Rosiphelee Bk4.1245-1446
- Idleness in Love Bk4.1447-1504
- Tale of Jephtha's Daughter Bk4.1505-1614
- Lovers must approve themselves in arms Bk4.1615-1687
- Arguments to the Contrary Bk4.1688-1770
- The Confessor replies Bk4.1771-1814
- Tale of Nauplus and Ulysses Bk4.1815-1900
- Examples of Prowess; Protheselai Bk4.1901-1934
- Saul Bk4.1935-1962
- Education of Achilles Bk4.1963-2023
- Prowess Bk4.2024-2044
- Tale of Hercules and Achelons Bk4.2045-2134
- Penthesilea Bk4.2135-2164
- Philemenis; Eneas Bk4.2147-2199
- Gentilesse Bk4.2200-2291
- Effects of Love; Love contrary to Sloth Bk4.2292-2362
- Uses of labour; discoverers and inventors Bk4.2363-2456
- Alchemy Bk4.2457-2530
- The Three Stones of the Philosophers Bk4.2457-2603
- The First Alchemists Bk4.2602-2632
- Letters and Language Bk4.2633-2700
- Somnolence Bk4.2701-2759
- The Lover's Wakefulness Bk4.2760-2890
- Dreams Bk4.2891-2926
- Tale of Ceix and Alceone Bk4.2927-3123
- Sleeping and Waking Bk4.3124-3186
- The Prayer of Cephalus Bk4.3187-3316
- Argus and Mercury Bk4.3317-3388
- Tristesse or Despondency Bk4.3389-3514
- Tale of Iphis and Araxarathen Bk4.3515-3712

== Book V ==
- Avarice Bk5.1-140
- Tale of Midas Bk5.141-362
- The Punishment of Tantalus Bk5.363-397
- Avarice Bk5.402-428
- Jealousy of Lovers Bk5.398-634
- Tale of Vulcan and Venus Bk5.635-746
- Belief of the Chaldeans Bk5.746-783
- Belief of the Egyptians Orus, Typhon and Isirus Bk5.784-834
- Belief of the Greeks Bk5.835-1496
- Birth of Venus Bk5.843-859
- Conception of Romus and Remus Bk5.883-914
- Apollo Bk5.915-936
- Mercury Bk5.916-952
- Vulcanus Bk5.953-966
- Eolus Bk5.967-980
- Neptune Bk5.981-1004
- Pan Bk5.1005-1042
- Bachus Bk5.1043-1058
- Esculapius Bk5.1059-1082
- Hercules Bk5.1083-1102
- Pluto Bk5.1083-1132
- Sibeles Bk5.1133-1152
- Juno Bk5.1155-1188
- Minerve Bk5.1189-1219
- Cereres Bk5.1221-1244
- Diana Bk5.1245-1276
- Proserpina Bk5.1277-1302
- Nereïdes Bk5.1336-47
- Origin of Idol Worship Bk5.1497-1590
- Belief of the Jews Bk5.1591-1736
- The Christian Faith Bk5.1737-1970
- Coveitise Bk5.1971-2020
- Tale of Virgil's Mirror Bk5.2031-2224
- Coveitise Bk5.2225-2272
- Tale of the Two Coffers Bk5.2273-2390
- Tale of the Beggars and the Pasties Bk5.2391-2441
- Coveitise of Lovers Bk5.2442-2642
- Tale of the King and his Steward's Wife Bk5.2643-2858
- False Witness and Perjury Bk5.2859-2960
- Tale of Achilles and Deidamia Bk5.2961-3218
- Perjury Bk5.3219-3246
- Tale of Jason and Medea Bk5.3247-4242
- Tale of Frixus and Hellen Bk5.4243-4382
- Usury Bk5.4383-4572
- Love Brokerage; Tale of Echo; Bk5.4573-4670
- Parsimony Bk5.4671-4780
- Tale of Babio and Croceus Bk5.4781-4884
- Ingratitude Bk5.4885-4936
- Tale of Adrian and Bardus Bk5.4937-5162
- Ingratitude Bk5.5163-5230
- Tale of Theseus and Ariadne Bk5.5231-5504
- Ravine Bk5.5505-5550
- Tale of Tereus Bk5.5551-6074
- Robbery Bk5.6075-6144
- Neptune and Corone Bk5.6145-6224
- Tale of Calistona Bk5.6225-6358
- Virginity; Chastity of Valentinian Bk5.6359-6492
- Stealth and Michery Bk5.6493-6542
- Stealth of Lovers Bk5.6543-6712
- Tale of Leucothoe Bk5.6713-6896
- Tale of Hercules and Faunus Bk5.6807-6960
- Sacrilege Bk5.6961-7031
- Sacrilege of Lovers Bk5.7032-7194
- Tale of Paris and Helen Bk5.7195-7590
- Sacrilege of Lovers; Divisions of Avarice Bk5.7591-7640
- Prodigality and Largesse Bk5.7641-7760
- Prodigality of Lovers Bk5.7761-7844

== Book VI ==
- Gluttony; Drunkenness; Bk6.1-75
- Love-Drunkenness Bk6.76-324
- Jupiter's Two Tuns Bk6.325-390
- Prayer; Bacchus in the Desert Bk6.391-466
- Love Drunkenness; Tristram Bk6.467-484
- Marriage of Pirithous Bk6.485-536
- Galbus and Vitellius Bk6.537-616
- Delicacy; Bk6.617-664
- Love-Delicacy; Delicacy Bk6.665-974
- Dives and Lazarus Bk6.975-1150
- Delicacy of Nero Bk6.1151-1227
- Love-Delicacy Bk6.1228-1260
- Sorcery and Witchcraft Bk6.1261-1390
- Tale of Ulysses and Telegonus Bk6.1391-1788
- Tale of Nectanabus Bk6.1789-2366
- Zoroaster; Saul and the Witch; Magic to be Eschewed Bk6.2366-2440

== Book VII ==
- The Education of Alexander; Three Parts of Philosophy Bk7.1-72
- Theoric (Theology) Bk7.73-134
- Physics Bk7.135-144
- Mathematics Bk7.145-202
- Creation of the Four Elements Bk7.203-392
- The Four Complexions of Man Bk7.393-489
- The Soul of Man Bk7.490-520
- The Division of the Earth Bk7.521-632
- Astronomy Bk7.633-684
- Planets and Signs Bk7.685-720
- The Planets Bk7.721-954
- The Signs Bk7.955-1280
- The Fifteen Stars Bk7.1281-1438
- Aldebaran VII.1310-1318
- Pliades VII.1320-1327
- Algol VII.1328 VII.1328-1336
- Alhaiot VII.1337-1344
- Canis maior VII.1345-1354
- Canis minor VII.1355-1362
- Regulus VII.1363-1370
- Ala Corvi VII.1371-1378
- Alaezel VII.1379-1386
- Almareth VII.1387-1392
- Venenas VII.1393-1400 Benenais
- Alpheta Bk7.1401-1408
- Cor Scorpionis Bk7.1409-16
- Botercadent Bk7.1417-1424
- tail of Scorpio Bk7.1425-32
- Authors of the Science of Astronomy Bk7.1439-1506
- Rhetoric Bk7.1507-1640
- Practicique; Five Points of Policy Bk7.1641-1710
- The First Point of Policy; Truth Bk7.1711-1782
- King, Wine, Woman, and Truth Bk7.1783-1984
- Daires Bk7.1783-1984
- Tale of Alcestis Bk7.1917-1949
- The Second Point of Policy. Liberality Bk7.1985-2060
- Tale of Julius and the Poor Knight Bk7.2014-2057
- Tale of Julius and the Poor Knight Bk7.2061-2114
- Antigonus and Cinichus Bk7.2115-
- Discretion in Giving Bk7.2115-2130
- Prodigality of Kings Bk7.2131-2176
- Flatterers Bk7.2177-2216
- Tale of Diogenes and Aristippus Bk7.2217-2317
- Flattery Bk7.2318-2354
- The Roman Triumph Bk7.2355-2411
- The Emperor and his Masons Bk7.2412-2448
- Caesar's Answer Bk7.2449-2490
- Flatterers of a King Bk7.2491-2526
- Ahab and Micaiah Bk7.2527-2694
- Justice Bk7.2695-2764
- Justice of Maximin Bk7.2765-2782
- Gaius Fabricius Bk7.2783-2832
- The Emperor Conrad Bk7.2833-2844
- The Consul Carmidotirus Bk7.2845-2888
- Example of Cambyses Bk7.2889-2916
- Lycurgus and his Laws Bk7.2917-3028
- The First Lawgivers Bk7.3029-3061
- Kings must keep the Laws Bk7.3062-3102
- The Fourth Point of Policy; Pity Bk7.3103-3162
- Troian Bk7.3142-3162
- The Jew and the Pagan in Stafford MS not in Fairfax
- The Tale of Codrus Bk7.3163-3214
- Pompeie and the King of Armenia Bk7.3215-3248
- Cruelty Bk7.3249-3266
- Cruelty of Justinian and Leontius Bk7.3267-3294
- Cruelty of Siculus Bk7.3295-3340
- Dionysius and his Horses Bk7.3341-3354
- Lichaon Bk7.3355-3386
- Nobleness of the Lion Bk7.3387-3416
- Spertachus and Thamaris Bk7.3417-3513
- Mercy must be without Weakness Bk7.3514-3552
- The Mountain and the Mouse Bk7.3553-3593
- There is a time for War Bk7.3594-3626
- Story of Gideon Bk7.3627-3806
- Saul and Agag Bk7.3807-3845
- David and Joab Bk7.3846-3890
- Solomon's Wisdom Bk7.3891-3944
- The Courtiers and the Fool Bk7.3945-4026
- Folly of Roboas Bk7.4027-4146
- Wisdom in a King's Council Bk7.4147-4166
- Mercy and Justice Bk7.4167-4214
- Anthonius Bk7.4181-4188
- The Fifth Point of Policy. Chastity Bk7.4215-4312
- Evil Example of Sardana Pallus Bk7.4313-4343
- Barbarus Bk7.4331-4344
- David Bk7.4344-4360
- Cyrus and the Lydians Bk7.4361-4405
- The Counsel of Balaam Bk7.4406-4468
- Evil Example of Solomon Bk7.4469-4514
- Division of His Kingdom Bk7.4515-4573
- Anthonie Bk7.4574-4592
- Tarquin and his son Aruns Bk7.4593-4753
- The Rape of Lucrece Bk7.4754-5130
- Tale of Virginius Bk7.5131-5306
- Tobias and Sara Bk7.5307-5365
- Chastity Bk7.5366-5438

== Book VIII ==
- Lechery; The Origins of Mankind Bk8.1-66
- Laws of Marriage Bk8.67-198
- Examples of Incest; Caligula; Ammon Bk8.199-222
- Lot and his Daughters; Incest Bk8.223-270
- Apollonius of Tyre Bk8.271-2018
- The Lover requires Counsel Bk8. 2029–2062
- The Confessor replies Bk8. 2150–2148
- The Controversy Bk8. 2149–2216
- The Supplication Bk8.2217-2300
- Venus replies to the Supplication Bk8.2301-2376
- Venus replies to the Supplication (continued) Bk8.2377-2439
- The Companies of Lovers Bk8.2440-2744
- Cupid and the Lover; Bk8.2745-2787
- The Fiery Dart withdrawn Bk8.2788-2807
- The Healing of Love; The Absolution Bk8.2809-2897
- Leave-taking of Venus Bk8.2899-2970
- Author Prays for the State of England; Bk8.2971-2994
- Evil of Division in the Land Bk8.2995-3053
- The Duty of a King Bk8.2971-3105
- The Book Completed Bk8.3106-3137
- Farewell to Earthly Love; Heavenly Love Bk8.3138-3172

== Gower's Revisions ==
- Design of the Book; Dedication CAvarPro.24*-92*
- Virginity; example of Valentinianus introduced CAvar5.6395*-6439*
- Tale of Lucius and the Statue CAvar5.7016*-7210*
- Example of Dante CAvar7.2329*-2342*
- Pity; example of Alexander CAvar7.3149*-3180*
- Tale of the Jew and the Pagan CAvar7.3207*-3360*
- Leave-taking of Venus CAvar8.2941*-2970*
- Author prays for the King; The King commended CAvar8.2971*-3043*
- The Author presents his Book to the King CAvar8.3044*-3069*
- Farewell to Earthly Love; Heavenly Love CAvar8.3070*-3114*

== Sources ==
- Confessio Amantis at Project Gutenberg (based on Macaulay 1901)
- Macaulay facsimile edition includes Introduction, Marginal notations and Notes
- G.C.Macaulay, ed. (1899). Vol 2:The complete works of John Gower. first half of Confessio Amantis(to V.1970)
- G.C.Macaulay, ed. (1899). Vol 3:The complete works of John Gower. second half of Confessio Amantis (from V.1970)

== Other Reading ==
- George L. Hamilton (1912). "Some Sources of the Seventh Book of Gower's "Confessio Amantis"". Modern Philology. 9 (3 (Jan., 1912)). University of Chicago Press: 323–346. doi:10.1086/386864. JSTOR 432439.
