= Mirour de l'Omme =

Poem written in french by John Gower

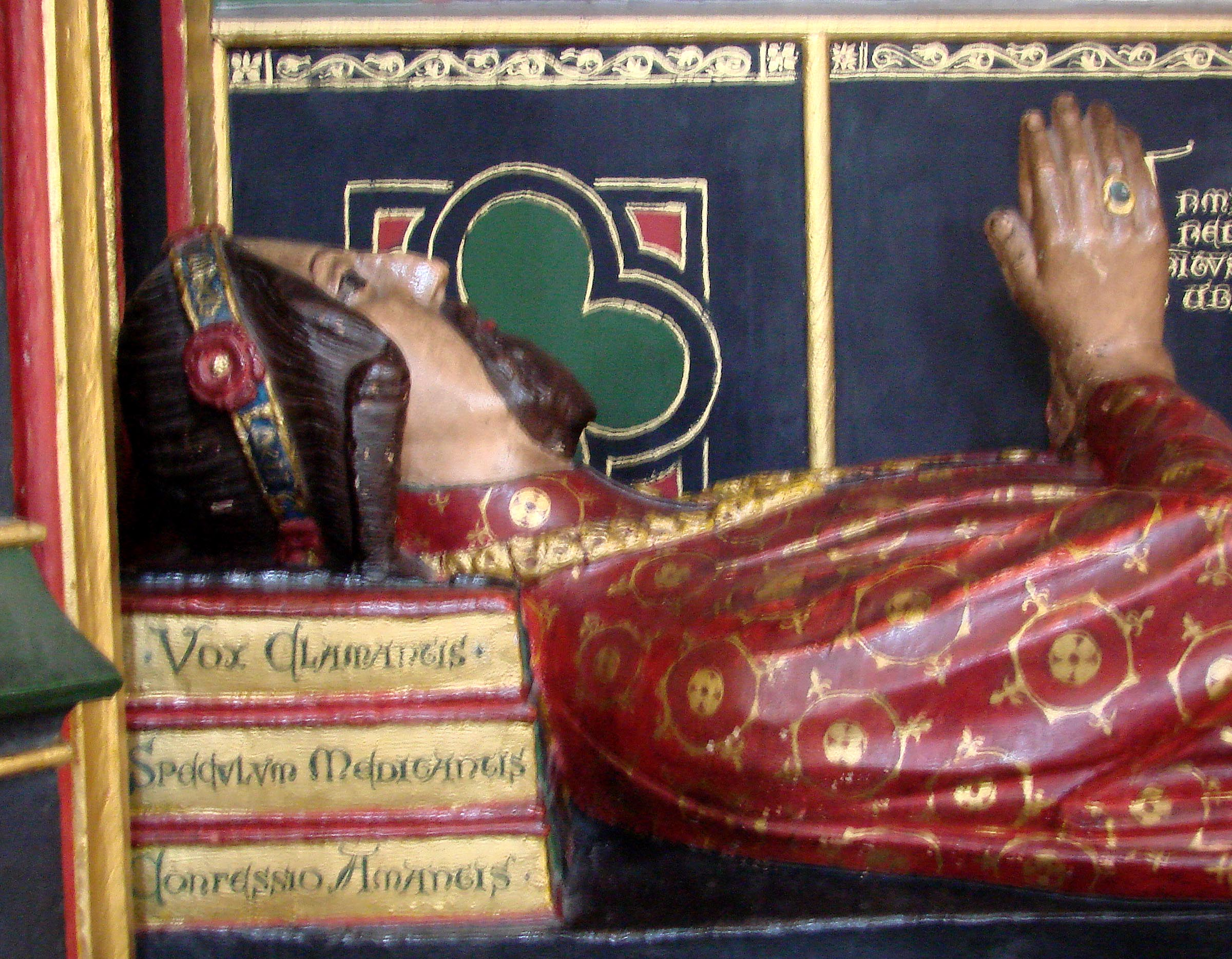
Detail from tomb of John Gower in Southwark Cathedral, Southwark, London, England. The head of the effigy rests on three books. Gower wrote Vox Clamantis in Latin, Speculum Meditantis in French and Confessio Amantis in English. Photographed by Karen Townsend in 2006.

Mirour de l'Omme ("the mirror of mankind") (also Speculum Hominis), which has the Latin title Speculum Meditantis ("mirror of meditation"), is an Anglo-Norman poem of 29,945 lines written in iambic octosyllables by John Gower (c. 1330 – October 1408). Gower's major theme is man's salvation. Internal evidence (no mention of Richard II) suggests that composition was completed before 1380. G. C. Macaulay discovered the only manuscript in the Cambridge University Library. Only part of the poem survives; the conclusion has been lost.

== Summary ==
The union of the Devil and Sin produces the seven daughters: Pride, Envy, Ire, Sloth, Avarice, Gluttony and Lechery. Reason and Conscience are unable to save mankind from the daughters and their granddaughters. In the second third of Mirour, God sends the seven Virtues who have granddaughters who oppose the Devil's forces. Much of the final third is an "extensive examination of the corruption of the Three Estates of society -- Church, State and Workers. Everyone is tainted." Repentance requires the intercession of the Virgin. The conclusion of the poem has been lost.

== Literary merit ==
Macaulay starts with: "it would be absurd to claim for it a high degree of literary merit, but it is nevertheless a somewhat noticeable and interesting performance". He then praises it for its design and thoroughness. R. F. Yeager compares this poem to Milton's poems. Mirour is "not easy, either to read or always to appreciate". The magnitude of vision and Gower's creative eclecticism make the Mirour unique.

== Choice of language ==
Yeager gives two quite different reasons for the poem being written in French. When composition started in the 1360s, Anglo-Norman was an important language in the court of Edward III. Gower was writing for the moral instruction of the king and his court. Existing Anglo-Norman literature leaned toward romance (although Duke Henry's Le Livre de Seyntz Medicines was an exception); English literature was moralistic. Gower followed a "bait and switch" strategy to attract readers looking for a romance. After the death of Edward III he was probably resident at St Mary Overie. This priory was an Augustinian institution where Anglo-Norman was spoken. Benedictine and Augustinian houses produced "acceptable alternatives to popular literature". "Gower could well have felt himself moved to provide for his new associates with a pen as well as pounds sterling."

== Importance ==
Mirour is the basis for the claim for that Gower was a major innovator of form. Gower is sometimes credited with a major innovation in poetic form. Chaucer "left it to Gower to invent the iambic tetrameter, and to later centuries of poets to solve the problems of its potential monotony; he himself merely polished the traditional Middle English short line." Fisher pointed that lines 26482 foresaw the Peasants' Revolt with "startling clarity". The centre section is an example of estate satire.

Gower considered Mirour to be his first major work. It is described in a recurring colophon composed in 1390.

== Translation ==
Gower, John (30 June 1992). Mirour de L'omme: (The Mirror of Mankind). Translated by William Burton Wilson. Michigan State University Press. p. 411. ISBN 978-0937191170.
