= The Pattern of Painful Adventures =

1576 prose novel

The Pattern of Painful Adventures (1576) is a prose novel. A later edition, printed in 1607 by Valentine Simmes and published by Nathaniel Butter, was a source for William Shakespeare's play Pericles, Prince of Tyre. There was at least one intermediate edition, around 1595.

It was a translation by Lawrence Twine of the tale of Apollonius of Tyre from John Gower's Confessio Amantis (in Middle English verse). It is also said to be translated from a French version. William Henry Schofield stated that Shakespeare used both sources.
