= Journalistic translation =

Journalistic translation is the type of translation used notably in newspapers. Journalistic translation research, JTR, also known as news translation, is a fairly new area of research in translation studies. The first research about it was conducted in the mid-2000s, but translations started appearing in newspapers as early as the 17th century.

== Context ==
The first news texts circulated in handwritten form and so few of these early texts still exist today. The first ‘newspapers’ were called avvisi, a word of Italian origin. Translation was, and still is, an integral part of journalism, in order for the public to be made aware of influential events happening in the world. For example, during the First and Second World Wars, journalistic translation was the way in which people were informed about the battles taking place in Europe and the Middle East.

== Journalistic translation in England during the 17th century about war ==
When the first newspapers appeared in England, they were translations from Latin, German and French. The Corante, which was also a translation of texts published in other parts of Europe, was imitating the Dutch model as they were mostly published in Amsterdam, Alkmaar and The Hague. It is said to be the first newspaper printed in England.

The London Gazette 19418

=== The London Gazette ===
At the end of the 17th century, The London Gazette published news about wars in Spain as well as the marriage of the Queen of Spain. For instance, in 1693, the Gazette wrote a report on the Battle of Landen in Flanders, where they expressed the tragic outcome of the human lives lost at war.

In 1698 and 1699, The London Gazette reported on the Papists; (a disagreement between the Emperor and the Pope in 1698 and the appointment of the Great Inquisitor in Spain in 1699).

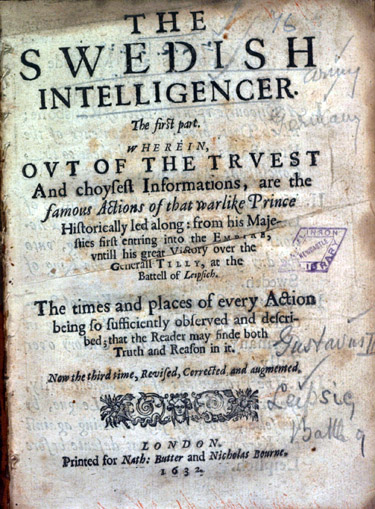
Proof of journalistic translation

=== The Swedish Intelligencer ===
Another example of journalistic translation was the newspaper The Swedish Intelligencer, created by William Watts. Published in London between 1632 and 1633, the paper referenced the sources of its translation. For example, the news writer clearly acknowledged his sources, which were for the most part of Dutch origin. In order to save money on the costs of production, the texts were known to have very few interpersonal editors.

=== Other examples ===
Some of the translators of continental pamphlets were religious refugees who came primarily from France. French Huguenots, who fled persecution, acted as translators.

On March 11, 1702, the first issue of The Daily Courant consisted of purely translations of one French paper along with two Dutch papers. The meaning behind the texts were clearly depicted as anti-Catholic.
