= Pirates and Emperors =

1986 book by Noam Chomsky

Pirates and Emperors, Old and New: International Terrorism in the Real World is a 1986 book by Noam Chomsky, titled after an observation by St. Augustine in City of God, proposing that what governments coin as "terrorism" in the small simply reflects what governments utilize as "warfare" in the large. Yet, governments coerce their populations to denounce the former while embracing the latter. In the City of God, St. Augustine tells the story

Indeed, that was an apt and true reply which was given to Alexander the Great by a pirate who had been seized. For when that king had asked the man what he meant by keeping hostile possession of the sea, he answered with bold pride, "What do you mean by seizing the whole earth; because I do it with a petty ship, I am called a robber, while you who does it with a great fleet are styled emperor".

This story also appears in John Gower's Confessio Amantis III.2363–2438 and in a poem by François Villon.

The book was republished by Haymarket Books in April 2015.
