= Sebastian Sobecki =

Medievalist (b. 1973)

- Occupations: Professor of Later Medieval English Literature, University of Toronto
- Awards: Morton W. Bloomfield Fellowship, Harvard University (2022); Visiting Fellowship, Magdalen College, University of Oxford (2021); H.P. Kraus Fellowship in Early Books and Manuscripts, Yale University (2019); Visiting Fellowship, All Souls College, University of Oxford (2016); John Hurt Fisher Prize, John Gower Society (2016); Andrew W. Mellon Foundation Fellowship, Huntington Library (2015); Professorship of Old Germanic (by courtesy), University of Groningen (2011)

Academic background
- Education: University of Cambridge

Academic work
- Discipline: Medieval and Tudor Literature, 1350-1600
- Institutions: University of Toronto, McGill University, University of Groningen
- Website: https://www.english.utoronto.ca/people/directories/all-faculty/sebastian-sobecki

Sebastian Sobecki (born 1973) is a medievalist specialising in English literature, history, and manuscript studies.

== Biography ==
Sobecki is professor of later medieval English literature at the University of Toronto. Prior to that, he was professor of medieval English literature and culture at the University of Groningen, the oldest chair (founded in 1886) for English literature in the Netherlands. At Groningen he also held by courtesy the Professorship of Old Germanic, established in 1881. Having received his education at the University of Cambridge, Sobecki became an assistant professor at McGill University before being appointed at Groningen. He works on late medieval English literature, particularly on literary history; handwriting, archives, and manuscripts; authorship and literary culture; law and literature; political writing and intellectual history; and travel and global medieval literature. Sobecki was awarded the John Hurt Fisher Prize by the John Gower Society and has held fellowships from Harvard University, Yale University, All Souls College Oxford, Magdalen College Oxford, and the Huntington Library.

Sobecki has written widely on medieval and early modern topics, and his articles have appeared in leading journals, including Speculum, English Literary History, Studies in the Age of Chaucer, Renaissance Studies, The English Historical Review, The Chaucer Review, The Library, New Medieval Literatures, and The Review of English Studies. Together with Michelle Karnes (University of Notre Dame), Sobecki is the editor of the periodical Studies in the Age of Chaucer. Sobecki is also editing Medieval Travel Writing: A Global History (Cambridge University Press).

He has made a number of important archival discoveries, such as identifying John Gower's autograph hand, finding a letter written for Margery Kempe's son, locating rebels linked to Piers Plowman, revealing the author (John Peyton) of the earliest English description of Poland, and demonstrating connections between tax records and the General Prologue to Geoffrey Chaucer's Canterbury Tales. Together with Euan Roger of the UK's National Archives, he published two new life records that show that Chaucer and Cecily Chaumpaigne were not on opposing sides of the law in the spring of 1380 but co-defendants in a labour dispute. Sobecki is also the voice behind the popular video recording of John Skelton's 'Speke Parott'.

== Selected publications ==
- The Case of Geoffrey Chaucer and Cecily Chaumpaigne: New Evidence, issue of Chaucer Review 57:4 (2022) (with Euan Roger)
- An Edition of Miles Hogarde's A Mirroure of Myserie (New York: Punctum, 2021) ISBN 9781953035530
- Last Words: The Public Self and the Social Author in Late Medieval England (Oxford: Oxford University Press, 2019 ISBN 9780198790785, 9780198790778
- The Cambridge Companion to Medieval Law and Literature (Cambridge: Cambridge University Press, 2019) (with Candace Barrington) ISBN 9781316632345
- Medieval English Travel: A Critical Anthology (Oxford: Oxford University Press, 2019) (with Anthony Bale) ISBN 9780192848604, 9780198733782
- A Critical Companion to John Skelton (Cambridge: D.S Brewer, 2018) (with John Scattergood) ISBN 9781843845133
- Our Sea of Islands: New Approaches to British Insularity in the Late Middle Ages, issue of Postmedieval 7:4 (2016) (with Matthew Boyd Goldie)
- Unwritten Verities: The Making of England’s Vernacular Legal Culture, 1463-1549, ReFormations: Medieval and Early Modern (Notre Dame, IN: University of Notre Dame Press, 2015) ISBN 9780268041458
- The Sea and Englishness in the Middle Ages: Maritime Narratives, Identity, and Culture (Cambridge: D.S. Brewer, 2011) ISBN 9781843842767
- The Sea and Medieval English Literature, Studies in Medieval Romance (Cambridge: Brewer, 2008) ISBN 9781843841371
- —— (1 July 2024). "Quo vadis, Adam Pinkhurst? Scripts, Scribes, and the Limits of Paleography: A Response Essay". Speculum. 99 (3): 780–804. doi:10.1086/730765. ISSN 0038-7134.
