= Catherine Carter =

Catherine Carter (born 1967 in Maryland) is an American poet, scholar, and educator. She is the author of poetry collectionsThe Memory of Gills (2006), The Swamp Monster at Home (2012), Larvae of the Nearest Stars (2019), and By Stone and Needle (2024). Her poetry is noted for its ecological focus, use of both myth and science, and accessible formal craft.

== Career ==
Carter is a professor of English at Western Carolina University. In 2021 she was the recipient of the UNC Board of Governor's Award for Excellence in Teaching.

Her book By Stone and Needle won the 2025 L. E. Phillabaum Poetry Award.

In 2025, Carter co-translated, with medievalist Brian Gastle, the first complete modern English verse translation of John Gower's 33,000-line Middle English poem, the Confessio Amantis.

== Books ==
- The Memory of Gills (LSU Press, 2006) ISBN 9780807131763
- The Swamp Monster at Home (LSU Press, 2012) ISBN 9780807142806
- Larvae of the Nearest Stars (LSU Press, 2019) ISBN 9780807169889
- By Stone and Needle (LSU Press, 2025) ISBN 9780807185070

== Awards and honors ==
- 2007 North Carolina Literary and Historical Society's Roanoke-Chowan Award for Poetry for The Memory of Gills
- 2009 Randall Jarrell Award, North Carolina Writers’ Network for “Toast”
- 2009 “Adam and Steve” Best American Poetry 2009
- 2013 First place Still: The Journal poetry contest for “Woolly Adelgid”
- 2014 Winner of Jacar Press’ Chapbook Contest for Marks of the Witch
- 2014 North Carolina Poetry Society's Poet Laureate Award for “Day of the Dead”
- 2018 James Applewhite Poetry Contest Winner, North Carolina Literary Review for “Womb-room”
- 2020 First-place Western NC Poetry Contest for “When You Tell Me I'm Being Racist”
- 2025 L. E. Phillabaum Poetry Award for By Stone and Needle
- 2025 Fisher Award for significant contribution to the field of John Gower Studies for The Lover's Confession: A Translation of John Gower's ‘Confessio Amantis’
