= Vox Clamantis =

Latin poem by John Gower

- by John Gower
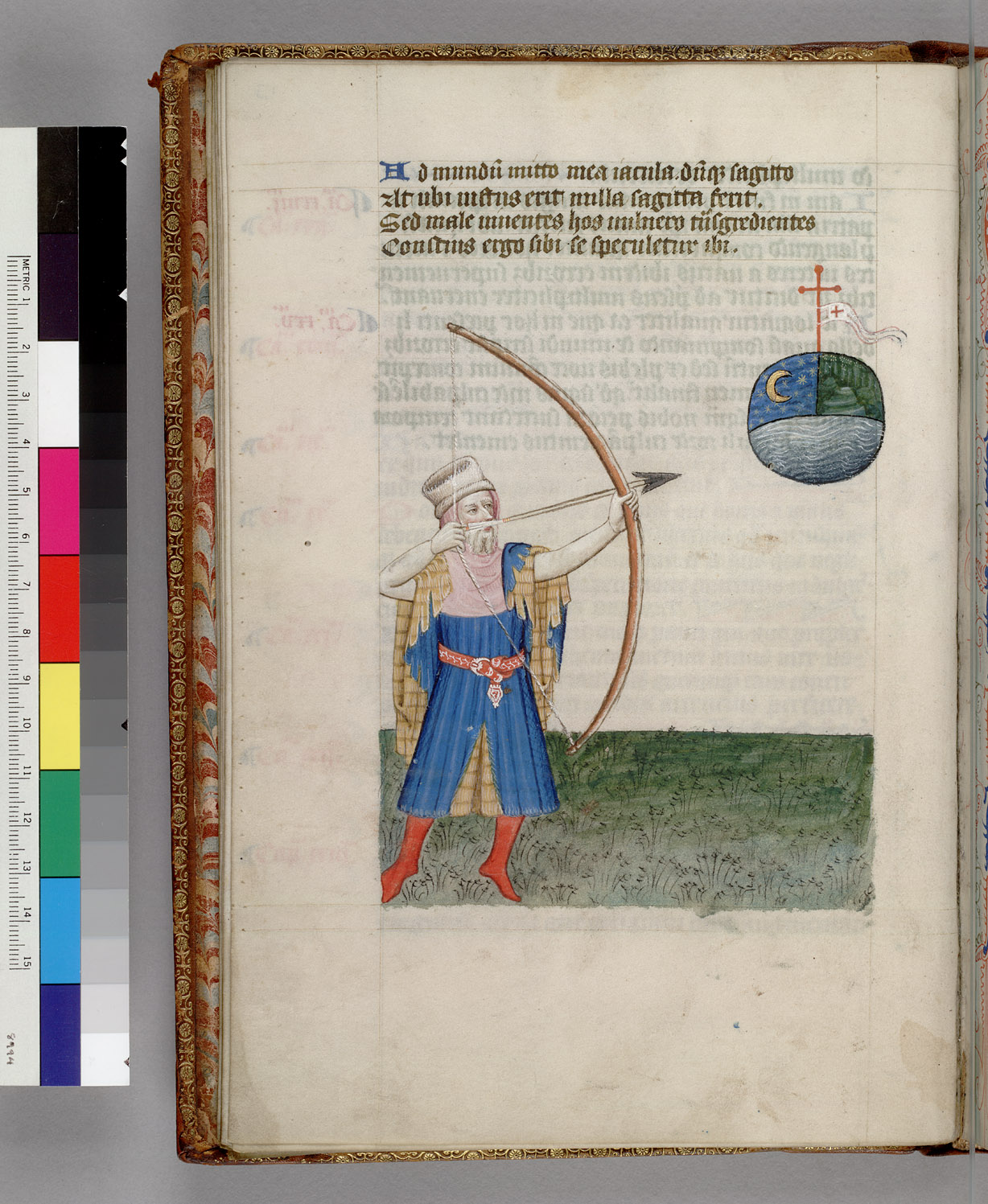
- Archer represents Gower; Globe segments are clergy, knights, peasantry.
- Translator: John Dryden; Henry Howard, Earl of Surrey; Seamus Heaney; Allen Mandelbaum; Robert Fitzgerald; Robert Fagles; Frederick Ahl; Sarah Ruden
- Written: 1370s–1400s
- First published in: 1400s
- Country: England
- Language: Latin
- Subject(s): Peasant's Revolt, English society
- Genre: Dream vision
- Meter: Elegiac couplet
- Publication date: 1370s–80s
- Media type: Manuscript
- Lines: 10,265

Vox Clamantis ("the voice of one crying out") is a Latin poem of 10,265 lines in elegiac couplets by John Gower (1330 – October 1408). The first of the seven books is a dream vision giving a vivid account of the Peasants' Rebellion of 1381. Macaulay described the remaining books: "The general plan of the author is to describe the condition of society and of the various degrees of men, much as in the latter portion of the Speculum Meditantis." Fisher concludes that books II–V were written in the 1370s while the author was writing similar passages in Mirour de l'Omme.

== Versions ==
Wickert divides the manuscripts into two groups: A-text (Macaulay's "initial version," Fisher's "b-version") and B-text (Macaulay's "final version," Fisher's "c-version"). The A-text for Book VI condemns the advisors of a young King Richard; the corresponding B-text condemns "the king's corrupt and corrupting young associates." There is a unique manuscript (MS Laud (Misc) 719 SC10601) which omits the Visio and numbers the books I–VI. Fisher calls this the a-version. Both Wickert and Fisher agree that the existence of this manuscript is strong evidence that the bulk of Vox was written before the Peasants' Revolt.

== Genre and purpose ==
Book One is a dream-vision. Galloway claims the Gower's use of dream-vision contributed to the demolition of the form. He cites only two instances of dream-vision in the fifteenth century. "Gower's reassessment of the dream-vision form throughout his career progressively and caustically dissolve its claims to revealing suprahuman powers, while using the form to explore the connections between human thought and interpretation and human needs and appetites."

Most critics cite the remaining books as an example of estate satire where the author complains about various problems in society. "This universal voice, the voice of the Old Testament prophets, is the mode of perception and expression that distinguishes medieval complaint from classical satire." Wickert disagrees and argues that these books have the form of a medieval sermon described in Luke 3:7–9.

Fisher summarizes: "What distinguishes Gower's views from those of many of his contemporaries, and places him among the progressive thinkers of this day, is his emphasis upon legal justice and regal responsibility for all the estates, defined in terms of "le biencoomue," "bonus communi," or "the common good," depending on the language in which be happened to be writing" Wickert asks the rhetorical question: "Did Gower achieve his goal?" Mirour included a call for soul-searching. Vox attempted to explain the signs of the times. The poem did not cause changes in society. "After the removal of the immediate danger, the homilist exhorted deaf ears."

== Sources ==
Several scholars have remarked on the quantity of quotations and adaptions from other authors in Vox. Macaulay observed "His knowledge of Ovid seems to have been pretty complete, for he borrows from almost every section of his works with the air of one who knows perfectly well where to turn for what he wants". Fisher observes that in Vox the borrowed lines "do not express any experience or sentiment taken from Ovid. ... The quotations come from such a variety of contexts and are so tailored to fit their position that if the passage [in the Vox] has any meaning, it must be that of the immediate author". Most of the borrowings in Vox appear in Visio Anglie. Fisher counted 327 lines borrowed or adapted from a total of 2150 for a ratio of about one in seven.

Gower acknowledged one source: "Peter of Riga wrote what I have written in his Aurora, and he will be a true witness and authority in this case. Paul Beichner identified several passages which were taken from the Aurora. Macaulay also found borrowings "from the poem of Alexander Neckam De Vita Monachomm, from the Speculum Stultorum, or from the Pantheon, so that in many places the composition is entirely made up of such borrowed matter variously arranged and combined. This is evidently a thing to be noted, because if the author, when describing (for example) the vices of monasteries, is found to be merely quoting from Alexander Neckam, we cannot attach much value to his account as a picture of the manners of his own time." In addition to the major sources listed above, Pouzet believes other material found in the library of the priory St Mary Overie may have influenced Gower. Gower was familiar with Brunetto Latini's Li Livres dou Trésor. Shrank suggests that portraying the rebels as lower forms was derived from Cicero's claims about civilized societies in De Inventione.

== Structure and content ==
All books are divided into chapters. Each chapter is preceded by a prose heading which summarizes the chapter. Three books have prologues.

=== Book I Visio Anglie ===
The Visio has 2150 lines describing the Peasants' Revolt of 1381. The horrors of 1381 are described in allegorical form and the rebels are condemned. Gower recounts the events of the revolt in "the form of a personal nightmare". Both Visio and Chronica "represent a thorough re-creation of historical events, reordered and recombined so as to fulfill the poet's own artistic vision and political purpose." Cornelius remarked that "Visio Anglie is distinguished from [other] chronicles, however, by Gower's unbridled fictive imagination, beside which the inventions of Walsingham and Froissart appear tame." Wickert divides Book I into three sections:

- Beast Vision (Chapters 2–12; first week of June)
- Troy Vision (Chapters 13–15; 13–14 June)
- Ship Vision and Epilogue (Chapters 16–21; 13–15 June)

==== Prologue ====
Gower provides a traditional prologue by stating the author, subject and purpose. Wickert traced this back to Honorius of Autun's commentary on the Song of Solomon. The author is identified by a cryptogram. Purpose and subject are covered by:

For I shall write nothing in order that I might be praised, and my performance does not intend that I should have a care for my future reputation. I shall enter the recent misfortunes that my country has exhibited, for it is a worthy labor to report the deeds of one's native land.

Wickert made several comments about the Prologue and Chapter 1. This is followed by a twelve line passage with several references to tears. The passage is emotional but only in the antepenultimate line does the word timor (fear) appear. "Thus Gower establishes an important coupling of sorrow and fear for the entire vision". Chapter One begins with a description of a spring day and segues into darkness where the dream begins. The daylight start is in the literary tradition of early Chaucer and others. In Biblical tradition, bad news tends to arrive at night. Therefore, Gower was obliged to dream by night.

==== Beast Vision (Chapters 2–12; first week of June) ====
The revolting peasants are transformed into asses, oxen, swine, dogs, cats, foxes, birds, flies and frogs. The typical model in Chapters 2–6 is that the rabble are transformed into rebellious domestic animals. These animals neglect their normal role of pulling a plow or pursuing a stag. There are usually references to classical animals of that species such as the bulls of Colchis and Minos. There may be one especially fearsome individual such as fire-breathing boar of Chapter 4. The animals have insatiate hunger and terrify people. Exodus 8 supplied the frogs and flies. Chapters 9 and 11 associate specific animals, such as the jackdaw, with the leaders of the revolt. Chapter 10 predicts universal ruin. The rebellious peasants are equated to the companions of Ulysses who were transformed to beasts by Circe. Isaiah is incorrectly cited as the source of Gog and Magog, rather than Ezekiel. The arms borne by the rebels are detailed in Chapter 12.

Novak is more sympathetic to the peasants than was Gower. She observes that the revolt was predicted in Book Five, Chapter 9. Some other chroniclers of the Revolt such as Froissart and Henry Knighton gave voice to the rebels. Wat Tyler "speaks out of character, as an enemy to his own cause" in Chapter 9. "Gower cannot enter into their characters any more than he can write a speech for a pig or a goose."

Wickert summarized the Beast Vision: Both the individuality and the limitation of Gower's talent are shown in the Beast Vision. Describing the Peasants' Revolt as an animal uprising could have been a significant artistic achievement. Only the rebelling peasants become animals. The free men do not. For this and other reasons this vision is not a beast allegory. Man without reason sins against the divine and natural order; thus a social revolution is also a rebellion against a divine institution. The rebels are possessed by demons and thus condemned to eternal damnation. "Gower is not writing a class critique, ... but a harsh condemnation which divinely sanctions every action against the peasantry. This is understandable ... but in no way accords with the attitude that Gower adopts in the following books of the Vox Clamantis and in Mirrour de l'Omne.

==== Troy Vision (Chapters 13–15; 13–14 June) ====
The legend of Britain's founding by Brutus of Troy was known to Gower's readers. Three important people are hidden behind Trojan figures (Queen Mother=Hecuba; Richard II=Priam; Archbishop Simon Sudbury=Helenus). Gower suggests that New Troy (Britain) might share the fate of the historic Troy. Chapter 14 contains an accurate description of the beheading of the Archbishop of Canterbury. The Trojan image is abandoned in Chapter 15 which emphasizes the rapacity of the peasants. There is some exaggeration particularly when Gower falsely claims: "in their madness they reckoned a church and a brothel as one and the same.".

==== Ship Vision (Chapters 16–19; 13–15 June) ====
Chapter 17 introduces the ship as a metaphor for the Tower where the royal party had sought refuge. Wickert observed that the prayer to Christ is a substitute for a classical invocation to Neptune when starting a voyage. The ship is not particularly safe as it is beset by violent storms. The description of the storm and the panic of the captain draws heavily upon the account of Ceyx and Alycone told in Ovid's Metamorphoses, A Christian prayer follows which is answered in the next chapter. Chapter 19 describes the bloody end of Wat. In Chapter 20, the drifting ship finally arrives in a harbor which is "more oppressive than Scylla". The dreamer meets an old man who has a rather pessimistic view of lawless, quarrelsome Britain.

Wickert offers several reasons for abandoning the Troy metaphor. Most obvious is that Aeneas and his descendant Brutus came to a much better end than did the city of Troy. She supplies other examples of the ship as metaphor for the state especially the poem "Seldom seen is soon forgot" In this poem Edward III and his son steer the ship, the Duke of Lancaster is the hull and the common people provide the mast. Chapter 18 introduces a monster worse than Scylla and Charybdis. The dreamer reflects that his sufferings were caused by his own sin. Wickert observes that this is the Augustinian view of the prodigal son. The City of God Book XI section 28 expresses this view. Wickert observes: "The idea of peace as the unrealized and unrealizable longing of the poet suffuses the entire Visio. It is expressed by pax, concodia, amor. The dreamer yearns for peace but a celestial voice advises him to stoically accept perpetual strife on this world. This yearning for peace cannot be satisfied because for the Christian author the soul can never find peace in this world. Not can he find peace in the sense of John 14:27 and 16:33. What Gower has the heavenly voice say is strikingly inadequate and can in no way stand as a solution to the problem.".

==== Epilogue (Chapter 21) ====
The dreamer awakens, he thanks God and Mary. The revolting oxen of Chapter 3 have returned to their yokes. Further revolts are predicted. The dreamer apologizes for the length of the dream and says he is compelled to write it all down.

=== Book II Prologue ===
Macaulay observes this is a short prologue to the following books. Gower argues that the problems of the day are the result of sin rather than fortune. Man should have faith and accept its divine order. Hodgson observed the complaints presented in Books III through V are not original. Wyclif and others made these complaints about the three estates throughout the 14th century. Chaucer, William Langland and Gower presented stock material in poetic form.

=== Book III Clergymen ===
The conduct of various clergymen especially prelates including the pope is criticized. Priests are also accused of misconduct. Of the 29 chapters only Chapter 27 states that some priests have honour. Fisher made two comments on Book Three. The fact that the shortcomings of the clerics themselves receive such disproportionate attention in the Vox is merely another evidence of its clerical audience. Fisher compared the criticism of Book III with similar passages in Mirour. The tone here is "much more legalistic". The remedy is to subject the clergy to the laws of laymen.

=== Book IV Religious Orders ===
Book IV deals with the failings of various religious orders including monks, Canons regular, nuns, and mendicant friars. Hodgson observes that Chaucer's Friar Huberd in GP 208–269 manages to commit all the sins described by Gower in Chapters 16–23. Chapter 5 begins with the commonplace: "The sea is the proper habitat of a live fish, and the monastery is the right home for a monk." Contrast with description of the Monk in General Prologue 177–181:

He yaf not of the text not a pulled hen
That saith that hunters been not holy men,
Ne that a monk, whan he is reccheless,
Is likened til a fish that is waterless
(This is to sayn, a monk out of his cloistre);

=== Book V Knights, Peasant & Townsmen ===
Knights, peasants and town-dwellers are discussed here. The first chapter looks back to past when a knight performed his deeds for justice rather than for fame. Several chapters condemn knights who are dominated by love for single women. Condemnation of courtly love which Gower considers adulterous is deferred to Book VII. Chapter 6 begins with a paragraph in praise of good women but segues into a long condemnation of bad women. Chapters 7 and 8 return to praise of the good knight who defends other classes and acts for honor rather than love, money or fame.

Agricultural workers are criticized in Chapters 9 and 10 as lazy, greedy and complaining. Stockton notes Gower reworked Genesis 3:19 to obtain "O sinner, the sweat and toil of the world be thine; in them shalt thou eat thy bread." Gower argues for divinely ordained labour as alternative to the popular verse:

When Adam delved and Eve span,
Who was then the gentleman?

Chapter 9 contains the passage which foreshadows the Revolt of 1381. The unruly serf is compared to a weed in a field of grain. "Unless it is struck down first, the peasant race strikes against freemen, no matter what nobility or worth they possess.". Like weeds they should be removed.

Wickert observes: "Of course, one does not expect sympathies for the agricultural worker, be he bound or free, in a country squire of the time – even before the Peasants' Revolt." Subsequent chapters decry the sins of urban workers and money lenders. Novak counted fifty chapters discussing faults of the clergy versus five chapters on workers. Chapter 15 begins with a condemnation of a mayor who "kindles malice among his fellow citizens". John Northampton who "was popular with the poorer classes" is the most probable object of Gower's disapprobation. The final chapter censors the talebearer who "utters many slanders in abuse of people".

=== Book VI Lawyers & Advice for a Prince ===
The first three chapters are a condemnation of lawyers. Stockton observed: "Chapter 2, which is written with real feeling, ironically places Gower on the same side as the peasants, who hated lawyers and attacked them in the Great Revolt." Scholars are divided on how Gower obtained his legal knowledge. His translator observed: "The first four chapters of Book VI should effectively dispose of the conjecture that Gower was a lawyer. He condemns them uncompromisingly." Meindl argues that Gower only condemns false lawyers. Fisher observes that Gower "emphasizes legal justice and regal responsibility".

What Wickert calls the "Mirror for a Prince" runs from Chapter 7 to Chapter 18. Much of the advice is created from contemporary truisms and thus not need a systematic foundation. The king must govern himself and be governed by law. Much of the advice is a conventional catalog of virtues.

The damage to a kingdom which can be inflicted by a wicked leader is discussed in Chapter 7. The pleas for justice lacks conceptual clarity and is permeated with ideas from the Bible and Cicero's De re publica Bad counsel from elders given to the boy king was condemned in the first version. The final version blames youthful comrades instead. Ayers asserts the praise of the Black Prince's foreign exploits in Chapter 13 contradicts the notion of Gower as a pacifist follower of Christ. Fisher takes a more balanced view than Ayers. The account of the earlier English successes on the Continent takes on a heroic ring, but Gower concludes that the Black Prince's real accomplishment was that he kept the peace at home: “The land was quiet under that great prince; no sword terrorized those whom his hand protected” . So, while “there is a time for war and a time for peace” , love is a king's best weapon: “Omnia vincit amor, amor est defensio regis” .

The original version (A-text) of Book VI held the boy king blameless for the problems of the kingdom. Gower uses the phrase "high court" which Fisher interprets as a reference to Arundel and the Suffolk. When Chronica Tripertita was added in 1397, the introduction and the conclusion were extensively revised. "The King always had an obdurate heart" is the foundation of the revisions. The king is accused of erratic application of the law.

=== Book VII 1–8 Sundry Sins ===
This sermonizing summary of the preceding five books begins with a reinterpretation of Nebuchadnezzar's dream of a statue (Daniel 2:31–44) comprising gold, brass, iron and clay segments. In Chapter 2 Gower associates the iron of the statue with misers. A rich man who lacks charity is condemned. The Chapter 3 associates clay with lechery. Stockton observes this is the only place where courtly love (a major theme in Confessio) is mentioned in Vox. Chapter 8 introduces an idea which Fisher considers a major theme. Man as a "microcosm whose sin taints the cosmos" can be traced back to fourth Lateran Council. This theme first appears in Mirour.

=== Book VII 9–19 Seven Deadly Sins & Decay of a Corpse ===
Chapters 9–17 associate different aspects of the decay of a corpse with the seven deadly sins. The mediation on death which occurs in chapters 9–19 is unusual in medieval literature. Wickert knows of only one other example. The personal and social benefits of righteousness are discussed in Chapters 21 & 22. Chapter 23 summarizes this treatise on the worldly estates.

=== Book VII 24–25 Patriotic Conclusion ===
Gower's "deep love for England" is displayed in Chapter 24. He laments the nations's decay due to sin. Chapter 25 is the author's apology. The contents are attributed to the "voice of the people" rather than the author's ideas. The A-text ended with:

I am worse than all men; but may the founder
of the world grant me relief through a priest. Amen

The B-text replaces this couplet with a prose transition to Cronica Tripertita. Macaulay observed that conclusion has been altered to be a fitting form of introduction for the Chronica Tripertita which comes in as an appendix added in later years.

== Chronica Tripertita ==
Chronica Tripertita is a 1,062 line Latin poem in leonine hexameter. It was published in the manuscripts of Wickert's B-text. Fisher summarizes the content as "Lancastrian propaganda under the guise of history." Three parts deal with different historical events.

The first part treats the events of 1387–1388 (Merciless Parliament). "Instead of calling his historical personages by name, Gower follows the literary convention of using heraldic terms, especially those based upon the names of birds and animals." "the King's party are throughout called greedy, treacherous plotters, and the Appellants model Englishmen."

The second part skips to 1397 where Richard exacted his revenge.

The final parts describes the events of 1399 when Henry supplanted Richard as king. "Gower ... approaches his material directly, with no allegory in his way."

== Explication ==
Vox Clamantis in Deserto ("A voice of one crying in the wilderness") alludes to the Vulgate translation of the Gospel of Mark 1:1–3 and of the Gospel of John 1:22–23 (where the voice is that of John the Baptist), quoting the Book of Isaiah 40:3. The account of this sermon in Luke 3:1–14 provided the outline for Gower's original Vox Clamantis (without Visio).

== Translations ==
- David R. Carlson (ed.). John Gower: Poems on Contemporary Events: The Visio Anglie (1381) and Cronica tripertita (1400). Translated by A.G. Rigg. Pontifical Institute of Mediaeval Studies. verse, Books II–VII omitted
- Stockton, Eric William (1962). The Major Latin Works of John Gower. Seattle: University of Washington Press. pp. 503. prose, includes Chronica Tripertita
- Meindl, Robert J. (2016). "Vox Clamantis Translations". Gower Translation Wiki. Gower Project. verse, Book VI only
- Meindl, Robert J., Mark T. Riley and R.F. Yeager (2025) Vox Clamantis by John Gower: "The Voice of One Crying". Cambridge: D.S. Brewer. verse, Books I–VII, includes Epistle to Arundel.
- The Norton Anthology Introduction Online Books III–V (abridged)
