= Nathaniel Butter =

English publisher (died 1664)

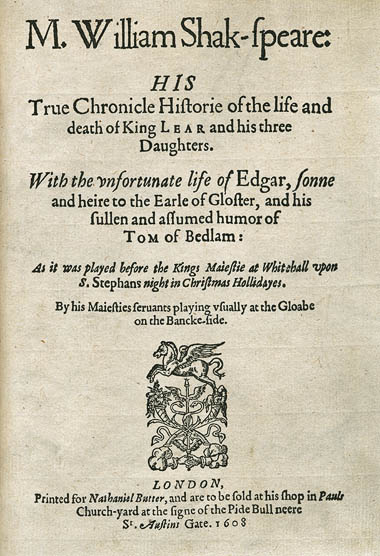
Title page of Shakespeare's King Lear as published by Nathaniel Butter in 1608.

Nathaniel Butter (died 22 February 1664) was a London publisher of the early 17th century. As the publisher of the first edition of Shakespeare's King Lear in 1608, he has also been regarded as one of the first publishers of a newspaper in English.

== Beginnings ==
Nathaniel Butter was the son of a Thomas Butter, a bookseller; the son followed the father's profession. Nathaniel became a "freeman" (a full member) of the Stationers Company on 20 February 1604, and registered his first title before the end of that year. In his career, Butter concentrated on bookselling and publishing; as was a common practice in his era, he commissioned printers to print his books, and worked with most of the printers of his generation.

== Drama ==
King Lear was entered into the Stationers' Register on 26 November 1607, by Butter and colleague John Busby. The first quarto edition of the play was published the following year, printed by Nicholas Okes, with Butter listed as publisher. Busby appears to have dropped out of the enterprise prior to publication.

Scholars have given Butter's volume intense scrutiny, since it, along with the contrasting First Folio text of the play, is crucial to the "textual problem" of King Lear. Q1 of Lear was the first play printed in Okes' shop; the origin and nature of the manuscript text that underlay the printed version is a matter of uncertainty.

The case of King Lear Q1 grew complicated in 1619, when William Jaggard reprinted the play, apparently without Butter's permission, in his cryptic False Folio affair. This problematic second quarto was issued with the false date of 1608 and the false inscription "Printed for Nathaniel Butter." Butter's London shop was at the sign of the Pied Bull, and the title page of his genuine 1608 Q1 is marked "to be sold at his shop in Pauls Church-yard at the signe of the Pide Bull neere St. Austins Gate." To differentiate between Butter's genuine 1608 Lear edition and Jaggard's false one, scholars have termed Butter's volume "the Pide Bull edition" after its title page inscription.

In addition to Shakespeare's play, Butter published a range of other playbooks. One of these was the first quarto of The London Prodigal, one of the plays of the Shakespeare Apocrypha. The title page of Butter's 1605 edition assigns the play to Shakespeare – an attribution universally rejected by scholars and critics.

Similarly problematic was Butter's edition of Thomas Heywood's play about Queen Elizabeth, If You Know Not Me, You Know Nobody. Butter registered Part 1 of the play on 5 July 1605, and Part 2 on 14 September of the same year, and published the two parts in separate quartos in 1605 and 1606 respectively. In his 1612 prose work An Apology for Actors, Heywood complained that Butter's text of his play had been pirated from the theatre, by an audience member who recorded the play in shorthand – one of the few indications that such practices occurred in the era of English Renaissance drama. Heywood's complaint did not prevent Butter from reprinting both texts, repeatedly, into the early 1630s.

Butter published various other plays, including:

- the first quarto of Samuel Rowley's When You See Me You Know Me (1605)
- Thomas Dekker's The Whore of Babylon (1607)
- Fulke Greville's closet drama Mustapha (1609)
- Dekker's The Honest Whore, Part 2 (1630)
- the third and fourth quartos of Heywood's The Rape of Lucrece (1630, 1638).

He also published Dekker's prose work The Bellman of London (1608), and the 1607 second edition of Lawrence Twine's The Pattern of Painful Adventures, a source for Shakespeare's Pericles, Prince of Tyre.

On 21 May 1639, Butter left the playbook business: he transferred all his copyrights to plays to fellow stationer Miles Fletcher, and for the remainder of his career concentrated primarily on the news.

== Controversy ==
17th-century stationers not infrequently got themselves in trouble with the strict censorship rules of the Stuart monarchy, resulting in fines, or, in rare cases, imprisonment. Butter got into significant trouble when he published a quarto pamphlet criticizing the 1619 accession of the new Holy Roman Emperor, Ferdinand II, titled A Plain Demonstration of the Unlawful Succession of Ferdinand II, Because of the Incestuous Marriage of His Parents (1620). This document, printed for Butter by William Stansby, falsely claimed to be printed "at the Hague" to avoid trouble – a gesture that proved fruitless. (In the complex religious politics of the time, radical Protestants and Puritans were hostile to Ferdinand, and the Stuarts were hostile to Puritans.) The London authorities pursued the matter vigorously: by the spring of 1622 Butter was petitioning to be released from prison, pleading for mercy on behalf of himself, his pregnant wife, and their three children. The printer Stansby followed Butter into custody, and in petitions of his own he blamed the whole affair on Butter. The petitions of both men were successful, and they were released, after short incarcerations, to continue their careers.

== News ==
Until Butter's historical era, news in England was transmitted primarily in manuscript form; early circulating news manuscripts – rather like hand-written newspapers, available by subscription from the earliest news services – were becoming more common in Butter's generation, and Butter himself was actively involved in their creation and dissemination. He also printed pamphlets on topical and controversial subjects, like the Calverley murders that were dramatized in A Yorkshire Tragedy, as well as international reporting like News from Spain and News from Sweden. Butter's shop at the Pied Bull was itself a kind of early news agency; news correspondent (in the literal sense) John Pory sent and received his communications from there, and news-conscious customers came in to find the latest tracts and pamphlets.

The next step in the evolution of the modern newspaper occurred at the start of the 1620s, when a group of London publishers and printers began disseminating printed news sheets based on the Dutch style of news bulletin, called a "coranto," that was a recent innovation at the time. This group included Butter, Thomas Archer, Edward Allde, Bartholomew Downes, William Newberry, and William Shefford, with Archer and Butter as apparently the most prominent participants. Archer was jailed for printing corantos without permission in 1621 – but in the same year a license to publish the news bulletins was issued to an "N. B.," most probably Butter. All of the extant copies of the Corante, the "earliest English newspaper" (1621), bear the initials "N. B."

On 23 May 1622, Butter published the first edition of a periodical variously called News from Most Parts of Christendom or Weekly News from Italy, Germany, Hungaria, Bohemia, the Palatinate, France and the Low Countries. "From its miscellaneous contents and periodicity of production, it is regarded as the true forerunner of the English newspaper." In 1624, Butter partnered with colleague Nicholas Bourne to continue publishing the Certain News of the Present Week, or, more succinctly, the Weekly News. Butter's innovation of a regular printed news journal caused an explosion of imitators, most of which were far more sporadic, temporary, and ephemeral than Butter's effort. "Nathaniel Butter's Weekly News was the first English newspaper which appeared duly numbered like our newspapers of the present day."

(The Weekly News was printed as a small quarto-sized pamphlet or booklet, in contrast to the earlier single-sheet corantos. These "newsbooks" remained the dominant form until the mid-1660s, when the more modern newspaper format appeared. Butter's periodical reported only foreign news; for which they subscribed.)

Butter's achievement was controversial in its time; among other hostile responses, one critic, playing on Butter's name, referred to his publications as "Batter" that "besmear each public post and church door...." Ben Jonson in particular was hostile and dismissive toward the new enterprise, and ridiculed Butter in his 1625 play The Staple of News. In a nice irony, Jonson borrowed the plot for his play from The London Prodigal, issued a generation earlier by Butter. Jonson's play, seasoned with "butter" puns, caricatures Butter as Cymbal, the head of the news agency the Staple of News. Jonson also mocked the nascent news industry in his 1620 masque News from the New World Discovered in the Moon.

In the early 1630s, Butter and Bourne reached the peak of their success with newsbooks selling well as a result of the successes of Gustavus Adolphus's campaign. They additionally began a news magazine series called 'The Swedish Intelligencer' that ran successfully under variant titles to 1634. Their enterprise was controversial, however: in October 1632, their weekly publication was banned all "gazettes and pamphlets of news from foreign parts." (In their mere existence, news reports of the combat of the Thirty Years' War were seen as implicit criticisms of the royal policy of neutrality.) In 1638 they were granted a patent from King Charles I for the publication of news and history, in return for a £10 annual donation toward the upkeep of St. Paul's Cathedral. Butter remained committed to reporting news of the war – until the start of the English Revolution in 1642.

Butter's publications often carried verbose titles, like A True Relation of a late very famous Sea-fight, made betwixt the Spaniard and the Hollander in Brasil, for many days together: Wherein the odds was very great, which made the success doubtful, but at last the Hollander got the Victory (1640).

== Miscellaneous works ==
Among the varied products of Butter's enterprise, his editions of George Chapman's translations of Homer – the Iliad in 1611, and the Odyssey in 1614 – stand out.

And in his long career, Butter published a wide range of other material: from joke books like The Cobbler of Canterbury (1608), to Tobias Gentleman's England's Way to Win Wealth, and to Employ Ships and Mariners (1614), to religious works like Abraham Darcy's The Original of Idolatries (1624), to polemics like Joseph Hall's An Humble Remonstrance to the High Court of Parliament (1640) – and virtually everything in between.

After 1642, Butter declined into obscurity. According to his terse 1664 obituary, "Nath: Butter an old stationer, died very poore."
