= John Hurt Fisher =

John Hurt Fisher (October 26, 1919 – February 17, 2015) was an American literary scholar, English professor, and medievalist, who specialized in the study of Geoffrey Chaucer and John Gower.

== Early life and education ==
John Hurt Fisher was born in 1919 in Lexington, Kentucky. His father was Commodore Bascom Fisher, a schoolteacher, and his mother was Franke (née Sheddan) Fisher.

Fisher grew up and attended elementary school in Iran, where his father served as an educational missionary for the United Presbyterian Church. He received his B.A. from Maryville College in Tennessee (1940), and his M.A. and Ph.D. degrees from the University of Pennsylvania (1942, 1945).

== Career ==
Fisher's first teaching appointment was as an assistant at the University of Pennsylvania (1942–45). After receiving his Ph.D. he taught at New York University (1945–55, 1962–72); Duke University (1955–60); Indiana University (1960–62). From 1972 to 1988 he was the John C. Hodges Professor of English at the University of Tennessee (1972–88), and was the head of their English Department from 1976 to 1978. He was a visiting professor at New York University in 1990 and at University of Texas at San Antonio in 1996.

He served as executive secretary and president of the Modern Language Association; as executive secretary he was involved in the visa application process for Carlos Fuentes, who had been denied entrance to the U.S., and was instrumental in the foundation of the Association of Departments of English. He was president of the New Chaucer Society, which he co-founded in 1974. He was a Fellow of the Medieval Academy of America and was elected vice-president (1985–86) and president (1987); he also served as President of the Fellows (1993–1996).

The South Atlantic Modern Language Association has an award in his honor, as does the John Gower Society. Loyola University Chicago awarded him an L.H.D. in 1970, and Middlebury College a Litt.D. in that same year. He was made a Professor Emeritus at the University of Tennessee. Joseph Trahern edited a Festschrift in his honor, Standardizing English: Essays in the History of the English Language in Honor of John Hurt Fisher (University of Tennessee Press, 1989).

== Scholarly contributions ==
Fisher contributed greatly to the study of Chaucer and Gower. He is one of the critics to argue that Chaucer's The Wife of Bath's Tale is based on Gower's The Tale of Florent. His John Gower, Moral Philosopher and Friend of Chaucer (1964) was described as a "definitive life" and a "landmark work".

== Selected bibliography ==
- The Tretyse of Loue (EETS old series 223, 1955)
- John Gower, Moral Philosopher and Friend of Chaucer (1963)
- The Complete Poetry and Prose of Chaucer (1977; third edition, with Mark Allen, 2012)
- The Importance of Chaucer (1992)
- The Emergence of Standard English (1996)
- "The Wife of Bath's Prologue and Tale" (2012), edited for the Variorum Chaucer with Mark Allen

== Personal life ==
Fisher married Jane Elizabeth Law in 1942; they had one son and two daughters. He died in Knoxville, Tennessee, at the age of 95 in 2015.
