= Andrew Chertsey =

English translator

Andrew Chertsey (fl. 1508–1532) was an English translator, now known for the devotional collection The craft to lyve well and to dye.

== Works ==
He undertook several translations into English of French devotional books for Wynkyn de Worde. The following are attributed to him:

- A Lytell treatyse called the Lucydarye, Wynkyn de Worde, London, 1508?, from a French version of the Elucidarius of Honorius Augustodunensis.
- Ihesus. The Floure of the Commaundementes of God, with many examples and auctorytees extracte and draw as well of Holy Scryptures as other doctours and good auncyente faders, the whiche is moche utyle and profytable unto all people, Wynkyn de Worde, London, 1521.
- A Goostly Treatyse of the Passyon of Christ, with many devout cōtemplacions, examples, and exposicyons of ye same, in prose and verse, Wynkyn de Worde, London, 1532. This book is stated to have been translated by Chertsey in 1520. A poetical prologue by Robert Copland is prefixed, in which Chertsey is stated to have translated many other books. Two of these volumes Copland describes as dealing with The Sevyn Sacraments, another was entitled Of Christen men the ordinary, and a fourth The craft to lyve well and to dye. Of this last work alone is anything now known. Caxton printed a book with the same title about 1491, consisting of his own translated extracts from a French work. But in 1506 Wynkyn de Worde published a complete translation of the same French work, and for this Chertsey assumed responsibility. Thomas Warton states that George Ashby was probably the author of some of the books ascribed by Copland to Chertsey, but evidence is lacking.

Chertsey's translation of the Second Lucidaire, a fourteenth-century prose adaptation of the Elucidarium (or Elucidarius), is over-literal, producing syntactical patterns and grammatical agreements (between nouns and adjectives, for example) which deviate from normal idiomatic English usage. A discussion is available in: Morrison, Stephen, ed., "The Middle English Lucydarye", Textes Vernaculaires du Moyen Âge, vol. 12 (Turnhout: Brepols, 2013).
