= Association of Departments of English =

American professional organization

The Association of Departments of English (ADE) is an American professional organization under the auspices of the Modern Language Association.

The ADE was founded by Warner Rice (then English chair at the University of Michigan), with the cooperation of John Hurt Fisher, then Executive Secretary of the MLA. Rice wished to create a forum in which English department administrators could share information; by 1995 more than a thousand English departments had joined the organization. The MLA later added an Association of Departments of Foreign Languages, with a similar aim, though Eugene Eoyang argued, in Coat of Many Colors (1996), that ethnocentrism is the only reason for the existence of dual organizations.

Its annual journal, the ADE Bulletin, publishes "articles and surveys dealing with professional, pedagogical, curricular, and departmental issues" for "English educators, scholars, and administrators in postsecondary institutions". Faculty members of member departments have access to the MLA's Job Information List. In 1985 it published A Checklist and Guide for Reviewing Departments of English, which provided information and ways to (self-)evaluate departments.
