= Russell Peck (scholar) =

American medievalist (1933–2023)

Russell A. Peck (December 17, 1933 – February 20, 2023) was an American medievalist, scholar of medieval literature, and author. At the time of his retirement in 2014, he was John Hall Deane Professor of English at the University of Rochester, where he began teaching in 1961.

== Education and early career ==
After a childhood in Wyoming and an undergraduate education at Princeton University, Peck earned a Ph.D. in English from Indiana University in 1963, writing a dissertation on number symbolism in the works of Geoffrey Chaucer. He was a visiting professor at the University of Hull, England, from 1967 to 1968.

== Career ==
Peck wrote extensively on medieval literature, folklore, cognitive theory, and pedagogy; he shaped the field of medieval literature by founding the Middle English Text Series in 1990. He also edited several important works of Middle English Literature, including a comprehensive three-volume edition of John Gower's Middle English Confessio Amantis. He taught at the University of Rochester from 1961 to 2014, facilitating the foundation of the Rossell Hope Robbins Library and leading an annual winter theater course in London for over twenty years.

== Awards ==
His research was supported by the Guggenheim Foundation and the National Endowment for the Humanities. In 2014, an Artistic Directorship at the University of Rochester was endowed in honor of Peck and his wife, Ruth; it is currently held by Nigel Maister. In 2015, he was awarded the Robert L. Kindrick-CARA Award for Outstanding Service to Medieval Studies by the Medieval Academy of America.
