= Petrus Riga =

French poet

Petrus Riga (c. 1140 – 1209) was a French poet. He is known for his work Aurora, which is a commentary on the Bible with emphasis on allegorical and moral interpretation. Although it has been called the verse Bible of the Middle Ages it is not just a collection of versified paraphrases.

Peter was a canon of Reims Cathedral, and wrote many works. He was an influence on John Gower. Vox Clamantis contains several passages taken from Aurora. Gower cites Riga as an authority in Book III Chapter 25.
