= George Ashby (poet) =

Member of the Parliament of England

George Ashby (c. 1390–1475) was an English civil servant and poet.

== Life ==
He was born about 1390, and was from Warwickshire. He was Clerk of the Signet, first to Henry VI from the beginning of his reign, and afterwards to Margaret of Anjou, in whose service he evidently travelled abroad. Margaret named him steward of Warwick in 1446. In 1459 he was in Parliament, as member for the borough of Warwick.

Between the summer and 28 September 1462, Ashby started a term in the Fleet Prison to which he was probably confined by the Yorkist conquerors of Henry VI, who was deposed in 1461. Prior to that, the poet would seem to have directed some part of the education of the young Edward of Westminster, Prince of Wales, Henry VI's son.

He appears to have owned an estate named 'Breakspeares' in Harefield, Middlesex. Ashby died on 20 February 1475, and was buried at Harefield. His son John was also a signet clerk under Henry VI and died in 1496. A grandson George was clerk of the signet to Henry VII and Henry VIII, and died on 5 March 1515.

== Works ==
His earliest extant poem, Complaint of a Prisoner in the Fleet, written in English and preserved in manuscript at Trinity College, Cambridge, describes him as a prisoner in the Fleet, and begins with a 'prohemium vnius Prisonarii.' The poem was composed between some time after Michaelmas 1462 and 24 March 1463.

For Prince Edward's use Ashby prepared two English poetical treatises that may have been designed as one poem: one entitled De Activa Pollecia Principis, which opens with an address to 'Maisters Gower, Chaucer, and Lydgate,' and the second called Dicta et Opiniones Diversorum Philosophorum, with translations into English verse. The combined work, Ashby states, was produced when he had attained the age of eighty. The sole manuscript containing these works, Cambridge University Library MS Mm.4.42, passed from the library of John Moore, Bishop of Ely about 1700, to the Cambridge University Library. This manuscript was a holograph written entirely by Ashby.

According to Thomas Warton, Ashby was likewise the translator into English of several French manuals of devotion, ascribed by Robert Copland to Andrew Chertsey in his prologue to Chertsey's Passyon of our Lord Jesu Christ (printed by Wynkyn de Worde in 1520): but no authority is given for this statement. None of Ashby's works are known to have been printed.
