= Corante =

First newspaper printed in England

Corante: or, Newes from Italy, Germany, Hungarie, Spaine and France was the first newspaper printed in England. The earliest of the seven known surviving copies is dated 24 September 1621 (although John Chamberlain is on record as having complained about them in August), and the latest is dated 4 November that year.

As with its predecessors, of which the earliest surviving copy is Pieter van den Keere's The new tydings out of Italie are not yet com from 2 December 1620, the Corante was translated from a Dutch coranto (hence the name) into English, and – as the result of a 1586 edict from the Star Chamber – carried no news about England. Unlike those predecessors, however, the Corante was printed locally, instead of being a Dutch import; in fact, the Corante's existence was the result of a request from James I that Dutch authorities cease coranto exports.

Early issues of the Corante are thought to have appeared as early as the spring of 1621; in September that year, Thomas Archer, a printer in London, was arrested for distributing corantos without a license, and his printing press was shut down. Archer was released shortly thereafter, as "a license to print (corantos) and sell them, honestly translated out of the Dutch" had been purchased by an individual identified solely by the initials "N.B."; these initials, thought to belong to book publisher Nathaniel Butter, or to Butter's contemporary Nicholas Bourne, appear on all surviving copies.

== See also ==
- History of British newspapers
