= Pericles, Prince of Tyre =

Play written in part by William Shakespeare

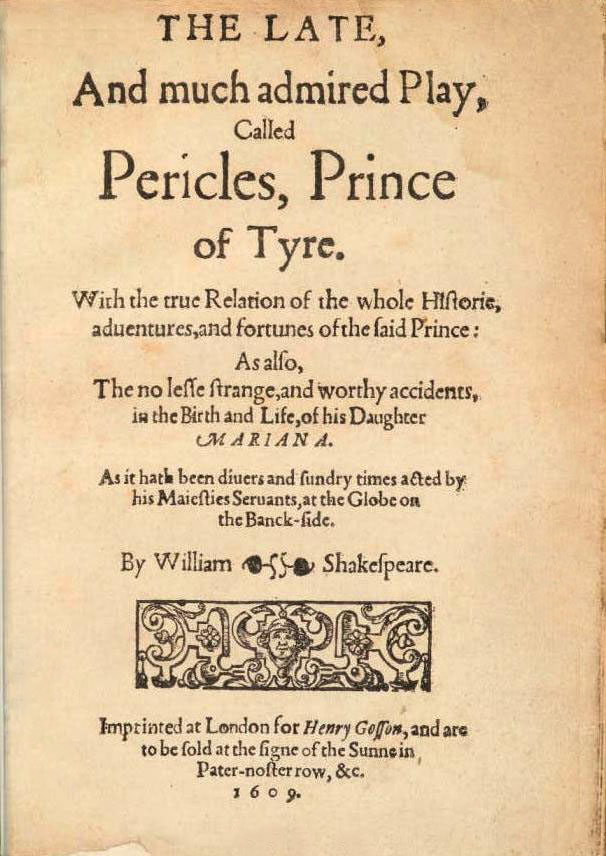
The 1609 quarto edition title page

Pericles, Prince of Tyre is a Jacobean play written at least in part by William Shakespeare and included in modern editions of his collected works despite questions over its authorship, as it was not included in the First Folio. It was published in 1609 as a quarto, was not included in Shakespeare's collections of works until the third folio, and the main inspiration for the play was Gower's Confessio Amantis. Various arguments support the theory that Shakespeare was the sole author of the play, notably in DelVecchio and Hammond's Cambridge edition of the play, but modern editors generally agree that Shakespeare was responsible for almost half the play — 827 lines — the main portion after scene 9 that follows the story of Pericles and Marina. (Note: E. g., DelVecchio & Hammond, Gossett, Warren, and Mowat.) Modern textual studies suggest that the first two acts, 835 lines detailing the many voyages of Pericles, were written by a collaborator, who may well have been the victualler, panderer, dramatist and pamphleteer George Wilkins. Wilkins published The Painful Adventures of Pericles Prince of Tyre which is the prose version of the story, and drew from Lawrence Twines' The Pattern of Painful Adventures. Pericles was one of the seventeen plays that were in print during Shakespeare's life, and was reprinted five times between 1609 and 1635.

== Characters ==
- Antiochus – king of Antioch
- Pericles – Prince of Tyre
- Helicanus and Escanes – two lords of Tyre
- Simonides – king of Pentapolis
- Cleon – governor of Tarsus
- Lysimachus – governor of Mytilene
- Cerimon – a lord of Ephesus
- Thaliard – a lord of Antioch
- Philemon – servant to Cerimon
- Leonine – servant to Dionyza
- Marshal
- A Pandar (male owner of a brothel)
- Boult – The Pandar's servant
- The Daughter of Antiochus
- Dionyza – wife to Cleon
- Thaisa – daughter to Simonides, Pericles' wife
- Marina – daughter to Pericles and Thaisa
- Lychorida – nurse to Marina
- A Bawd (female owner of a brothel)
- Diana
- Gower as Chorus
- Lords, Knights, Gentlemen, Sailors, Pirates, Fisherman, and Messengers

== Synopsis ==
John Gower introduces each act with a prologue. The play opens in the court of Antiochus, king of Antioch, who has offered the hand of his beautiful daughter to any man who answers his riddle; but those who fail shall die.

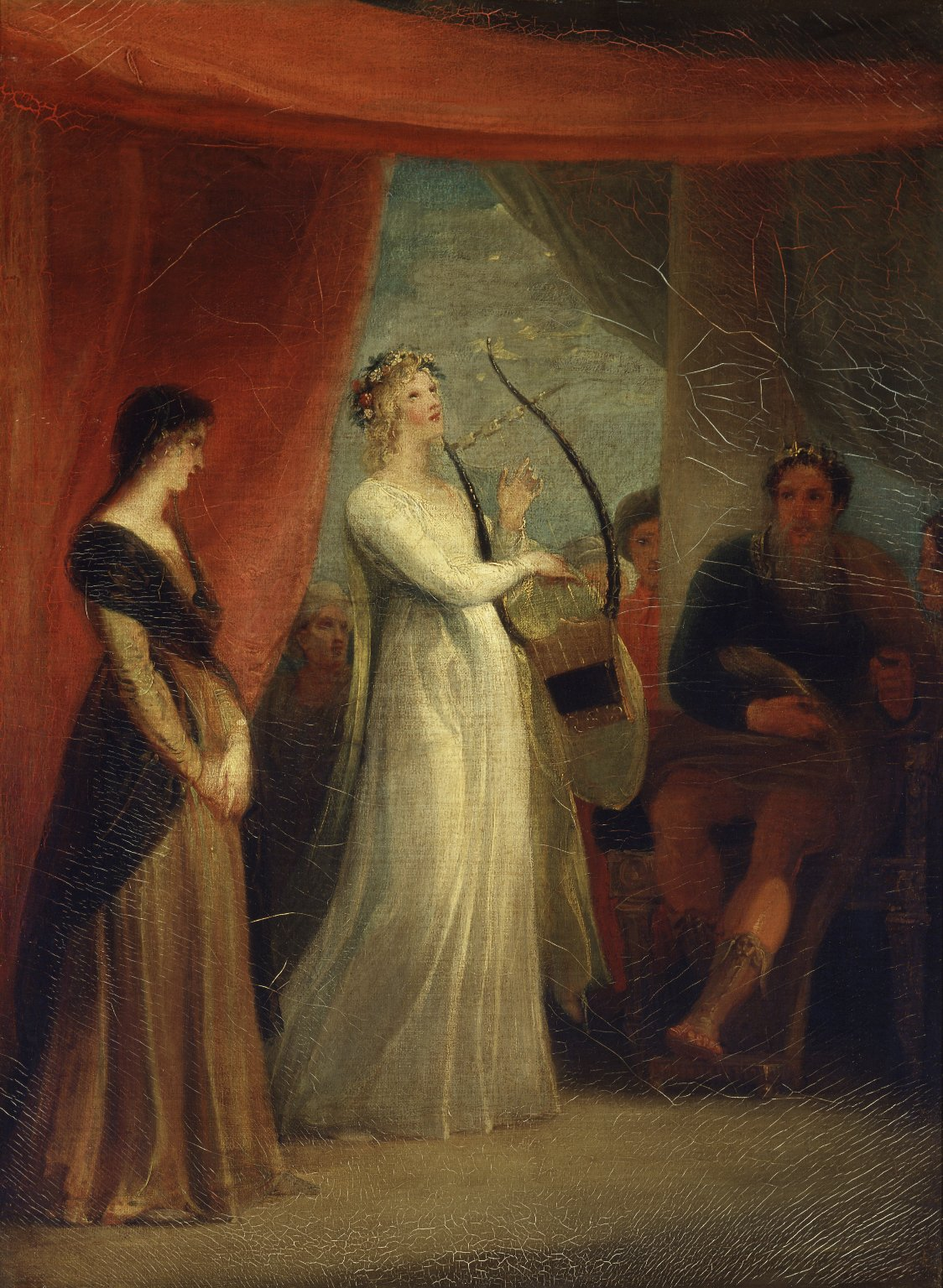
Marina singing before Pericles, Thomas Stothard, 1825

I am no Viper, yet I feed
On mother's flesh which did me breed:
I sought a husband, in which labour,
I found that kindness in a father;
He's father, son, and husband mild,
I mother, wife; and yet his child:
How they may be, and yet in two,
As you will live resolve it you.

Pericles, the young Prince (ruler) of Tyre in Phoenicia (Lebanon), hears the riddle, and instantly understands its meaning: Antiochus is engaged in an incestuous relationship with his daughter. If he answers incorrectly, he will be killed, but if he reveals the truth, he will be killed anyway. Pericles hints that he knows the answer, and asks for more time to think. Antiochus grants him forty days, and then sends an assassin after him. However, Pericles has fled the city in disgust.

Pericles returns to Tyre, where his trusted friend and counsellor Helicanus advises him to leave the city, for Antiochus surely will hunt him down. Pericles leaves Helicanus as regent and sails to Tarsus, a city beset by famine. The generous Pericles gives the governor of the city, Cleon, and his wife Dionyza, grain from his ship to save their people. The famine ends, and after being thanked profusely by Cleon and Dionyza, Pericles continues on.

A storm wrecks Pericles' ship and washes him up on the shores of Pentapolis. He is rescued by a group of poor fishermen who inform him that Simonides, King of Pentapolis, is holding a tournament the next day and that the winner will receive the hand of his daughter Thaisa in marriage. Fortunately, one of the fishermen drags Pericles' suit of armour on shore that very moment, and the prince decides to enter the tournament. Although his equipment is rusty, Pericles wins the tournament and the hand of Thaisa (who is deeply attracted to him) in marriage. Simonides initially expresses doubt about the union, but soon comes to like Pericles and allows them to wed.

A letter sent by the noblemen reaches Pericles in Pentapolis, who decides to return to Tyre with the pregnant Thaisa. Again, a storm arises while at sea, and Thaisa appears to die giving birth to her child, Marina. The sailors insist that Thaisa's body be set overboard in order to calm the storm. Pericles grudgingly agrees, and decides to stop at Tarsus because he fears that Marina may not survive the storm.

Luckily, Thaisa's casket washes ashore at Ephesus near the residence of Lord Cerimon, a physician who revives her. Thinking that Pericles died in the storm, Thaisa becomes a priestess in the temple of Diana.

Pericles departs to rule Tyre, leaving Marina in the care of Cleon and Dionyza.

Marina grows up more beautiful than Philoten the daughter of Cleon and Dionyza, so Dionyza plans Marina's murder. The plan is thwarted when pirates kidnap Marina and then sell her to a brothel in Mytilene. There, Marina manages to keep her virginity by convincing the men that they should seek virtue. Worried that she is ruining their market, the brothel rents her out as a tutor to respectable young ladies. She becomes famous for music and other decorous entertainments.

Meanwhile, Pericles returns to Tarsus for his daughter. The governor and his wife claim she has died; in grief, he takes to the sea.

Pericles' wanderings bring him to Mytilene where the governor Lysimachus, seeking to cheer him up, brings in Marina. They compare their sad stories and joyfully realise they are father and daughter. Next, the goddess Diana appears in a dream to Pericles, and tells him to come to the temple where he finds Thaisa. The wicked Cleon and Dionyza are killed when their people revolt against their crime. Lysimachus will marry Marina.

== Sources ==
The play draws upon two sources for the plot. The first is Confessio Amantis (1393) of John Gower, an English poet and contemporary of Geoffrey Chaucer. This provides the story of Apollonius of Tyre. The second source is the Lawrence Twine prose version of Gower's tale, The Pattern of Painful Adventures, dating from c. 1576, reprinted in 1607.

A third related work is The Painful Adventures of Pericles by George Wilkins, published in 1608. But this seems to be a "novelization" of the play, stitched together with bits from Twine; Wilkins mentions the play in the Argument to his version of the story – so that Wilkins' novel derives from the play, not the play from the novel. Wilkins, who with Shakespeare was a witness in the Bellott v. Mountjoy lawsuit of 1612, has been an obvious candidate for the author of the non-Shakespearean matter in the play's first two acts; Wilkins wrote plays very similar in style, and no better candidate has been found.

The choruses spoken by Gower were influenced by Barnabe Barnes's The Diuils Charter (1607) and by The Trauailes of the Three English Brothers (1607), by John Day, William Rowley, and Wilkins.

== Date and text ==
Most scholars support 1607 or early 1608 as most likely, which accords well with what is known about the play's likely co-author, George Wilkins, whose extant literary career seems to span only three years, 1606 to 1608. The only published text of Pericles, the 1609 quarto (all subsequent quartos were reprints of the original), is manifestly corrupt; it is often clumsily written and incomprehensible and has been interpreted as a pirated text reconstructed from memory by someone who witnessed the play (much like theories surrounding the 1603 "bad quarto" of Hamlet). The play was printed in quarto twice in 1609 by the stationer Henry Gosson. Subsequent quarto printings appeared in 1611, 1619, 1630, and 1635; it was one of Shakespeare's most popular plays in his own historical era. The play was not included in the First Folio in 1623; it was one of seven plays added to the original Folio thirty-six in the second impression of the Third Folio in 1664. William Jaggard included Pericles in his 1619 False Folio.

The editors of the Oxford and Arden editions of Pericles accept Wilkins as Shakespeare's collaborator, citing stylistic links between the play and Wilkins's style that are found nowhere else in Shakespeare. The Cambridge editors reject this contention, arguing that the play is entirely by Shakespeare and that all the oddities can be defended as a deliberately old-fashioned style; however, they do not discuss the stylistic links with Wilkins's work or any of the scholarly papers demonstrating contrary opinions. If the play was co-written or revised by Wilkins, this would support a later date, as it is believed Wilkins' career as a writer spanned only the years 1606–8. The 1986 Oxford University Press edition of the Complete Works and the subsequent individual edition include a "reconstructed text" of Pericles, which adapts passages from Wilkins' novel on the assumption that they are based on the play and record the dialogue more accurately than the quarto.

The play has been recognised as a probable collaboration since 1709, if not earlier. In that year Nicholas Rowe wrote, "there is good Reason to believe that the greatest part of that Play was not written by him; tho' it is own'd, some part of it certainly was, particularly the last Act." Rowe here seems to be summarising what he believes to be a consensus view in his day, although some critics thought it was either an early Shakespeare work or not written by him at all. Wilkins has been proposed as the co-author since 1868. In 1919, H. Dugdale Sykes published a detailed comparison of numerous parallels between the first half of Pericles and four of Wilkins's works, but he thought that Wilkins's novelisation of the play preceded its composition. Many other scholars followed Sykes in his identification of Wilkins, most notably Jonathan Hope in 1994 and MacDonald P. Jackson in 1993 and 2003. In 2002, Prof. Brian Vickers summarised the historical evidence and took the Cambridge editors to task for ignoring more than a century of scholarship.

== Analysis and criticism ==
Critical response to the play has traditionally been mixed. In 1629, Ben Jonson lamented the audiences' enthusiastic responses to the play:

No doubt some mouldy tale,
Like Pericles; and stale
As the Shrieve's crusts, and nasty as his fish—
Scraps out of every dish
Throwne forth, and rak't into the common tub

— Ben Jonson, Ode (to Himself)

In 1660, at the start of the Restoration when the theatres had just re-opened, Thomas Betterton played the title role in a new production of Pericles at the Cockpit Theatre, the first production of any of Shakespeare's works in the new era. Gary Taylor credits Betterton's performance in Pericles for the addition of Shakespeare's play to the theatrical repertoire in the mid-seventeenth century.

After Jonson and until the mid-twentieth century, critics found little to like or praise in the play. For example, nineteenth-century scholar Edward Dowden wrestled with the text and found that the play "as a whole is singularly undramatic" and "entirely lacks unity of action." The episodic nature of the play combined with the Act Four's lewdness troubled Dowden because these traits problematised his idea of Shakespeare. Dowden also banished Titus Andronicus from the canon because it belonged to "the pre-Shakespearean school of bloody dramas".

T. S. Eliot found more to admire, saying of the moment of Pericles' reunion with his daughter: "To my mind the finest of all the 'recognition scenes' is Act V, sc. i of that very great play Pericles. It is a perfect example of the 'ultra-dramatic', a dramatic action of beings who are more than human... or rather, seen in a light more than that of day."

The New Bibliographers of the early twentieth century Alfred W. Pollard, Walter Wilson Greg, and R. B. McKerrow gave increased attention to the examination of quarto editions of Shakespearean plays published before the First Folio (1623). Pericles was among the most notorious "bad quartos". In the second half of the twentieth century, critics began to warm to the play. After John Arthos' 1953 article "Pericles, Prince of Tyre: A Study in the Dramatic Use of Romantic Narrative," scholars began to find merits and interesting facets within the play's dramaturgy, narrative and use of the marvelous. And, while the play's textual critics have sharply disagreed about editorial methodology in the last half-century, almost all of them, beginning with F. D. Hoeniger with his 1963 Arden 2 edition, have been enthusiastic about Pericles. Other more recent critics have been Stephen Orgel (Pelican Shakespeare), Suzanne Gossett (Arden 3), Roger Warren (Reconstructed Oxford), and Doreen DelVecchio and Antony Hammond (Cambridge).

Harold Bloom said that the play works well on the stage despite its problems, and even wrote, "Perhaps because he declined to compose the first two acts, Shakespeare compensated by making the remaining three acts into his most radical theatrical experiment since the mature Hamlet of 1600–1601."

== Performance history ==
The Venetian ambassador to England Zorzi Giustinian and the French diplomat Antoine Lefèvre de la Boderie saw a play titled Pericles. Giustinian was in London from 5 January 1606 to 23 November 1608. As far as is known, there was no other play with the same title that was acted in this era; the usual assumption is that this must have been Shakespeare's play. The title page of the play's first printed edition states that the play was often acted at the Globe Theatre, which was most likely true.

The earliest performance of Pericles known with certainty occurred in May 1619, at Court, "in the King's great chamber" at Whitehall. The play was also performed at the Globe Theatre on 10 June 1631. A play called Pericles was in the repertory of a recusant group of itinerant players arrested for performing a religious play at Goulthwaite Hall in Yorkshire in 1609; however, it is not clear if they performed Pericles, or if theirs was Shakespeare's play.

John Rhodes staged Pericles at the Cockpit Theatre soon after the theatres re-opened in 1660; it was one of the earliest productions, and the first Shakespearean revival, of the Restoration period. Thomas Betterton made his stage debut in the title role. Yet the play's pseudo-naive structure placed it at odds with the neoclassical tastes of the Restoration era. It vanished from the stage for nearly two centuries, until Samuel Phelps staged a production at Sadler's Wells Theatre in Clerkenwell in 1854. Phelps cut Gower entirely, satisfying his narrative role with new scenes, conversations between unnamed gentlemen like those in The Winter's Tale, 5.2. In accordance with Victorian notions of decorum, the play's frank treatment of incest and prostitution was muted or removed.

Walter Nugent Monck revived the play in 1929 at his Maddermarket Theatre in Norwich, cutting the first act. This production was revived at Stratford after the war, with Paul Scofield in the title role.

=== Modern revivals ===
The play has risen somewhat in popularity since Monck, though it remains extraordinarily difficult to stage effectively, an aspect played with in Paris Belongs to Us (filmed 1957–1960).

- In 1958, Tony Richardson directed the play at the Shakespeare Memorial Theatre in Stratford. The scene design, by Loudon Sainthill, unified the play; the stage was dominated by a large ship in which Gower related the tale to a group of sailors. Geraldine McEwan played Marina; Richard Johnson was Pericles; and Mark Dignam was Simonides. Angela Baddeley was the Bawd. The production was a success; it was later viewed as a model for "coherent" or thematically unified approaches, in contrast to the postmodern or disintegrative approaches of the seventies and eighties.
- The 1969 production by Terry Hands at Stratford also received favourable reviews. The set was almost bare, with a hanging replica of Leonardo da Vinci's Vitruvian Man above a bare stage. Hands also introduced extensive doubling, which has since become a staple of productions of this play. Emrys James played Gower (as a Welsh bard) and Helicanus. Susan Fleetwood doubled Thaisa and Marina (with Susan Sheers playing Marina when the two characters appear together in the final scene). Ian Richardson played the title role. For the performances on the nights of the Apollo landing, Hands added a special acknowledgment of the event to Gower's lines.
- Ron Daniels directed the play in 1979 at The Other Place, an unlikely venue for such an expansive play. Daniels compensated for the lack of space by canny use of lighting and offstage music and sound effects. Peter McEnery played Pericles; Julie Peasgood was Marina. Griffith Jones was Gower.
- The play was among those adapted for the BBC Television Shakespeare series and was first transmitted on 8 December 1984. The play was opened out so as to deal with the various locations and time intervals and was given a thoughtful and moving interpretation. Mike Gwilym played Pericles, Amanda Redman was Marina and Juliet Stevenson was Thaisa. It was directed by David Jones.
- In 1989, David Thacker directed the play at the Swan. The production was centred on a grid-covered trap suspended in air; the brothel scenes were played below, as in a basement; the shipboard scenes were played on and around the grid. Rudolph Walker was Gower, dressed as a bureaucrat; Nigel Terry played Pericles, and Suzan Sylvester and Sally Edwards were Marina and Thaisa, respectively.
- Productions in the 1990s differed from earlier productions in that they generally stressed the dislocation and diversity inherent in the play's setting, rather than striving for thematic and tonal coherence. As early as 1983, Peter Sellars directed a production in Boston that featured extras dressed as contemporary American homeless people; devices such as these dominated English main stages in the nineties. Phyllida Lloyd directed the play at the Royal National Theatre in 1994. The production used extensive doubling. Kathryn Hunter played Antiochus, Cerimon, and the Bawd. The production made extensive use of the mechanised wheel in the theatre to emphasise movement in time and space; however, the wheel's noise made some scenes difficult to hear, and some critics disparaged what they saw as pointless gimmickry in the staging.
- Adrian Noble's 2002 production at the Roundhouse (his last before leaving the RSC) stressed diversity in another way. Responding to critical interest in Orientalism, Noble accentuated the multicultural aspects of the play's setting. Ray Fearon took the title role to Lauren Ward's Thaisa; Kananu Kirimi played Marina. Brian Protheroe was Gower. In an echo of the music played during the interval of the 1619 Whitehall performance, Noble featured belly dancing and drumming during the intermission of his production.
- Mary Zimmerman directed Pericles at Washington, D.C.'s Shakespeare Theatre Company for their 2004–05 Season. The production transferred to Chicago's Goodman Theatre in 2006.
- The Hudson Shakespeare Company of New Jersey mounted the play in two separate productions in their annual Shakespeare in the Parks series, directed by Jon Ciccarelli (2006) and Noelle Fair (2014) respectively. Both directors noted the 2002 Adrian Noble production as a direct influence on their productions utilizing diversely ethnic casts and set in Mediterranean locales. Ciccarelli's production took a more historical and literary slant on the story using Gower as a direct story teller of the action in medieval costume vs. the Greek/Turkish garb of the main cast. Fair's production took a more dream like approach using a variety of international music and devised movement pieces to convey the Gower dialogue.
- Joseph Haj directed several productions of Pericles from 2008 to 2016: at the PlayMakers Repertory Company in Chapel Hill, North Carolina, in 2008; at the Oregon Shakespeare Festival in 2015; and at the Guthrie Theater in Minneapolis, Minnesota, in 2016—his inaugural production as artistic director of that institution.
- The 2015 Shakespeare's Globe production directed by Dominic Dromgoole used a minimal set within the tiny, candlelit Sam Wanamaker Playhouse. Sheila Reid played Gower and James Garnon played Pericles. The production was noted for its humor.
- Cesear's Forum, Cleveland's minimalist theatre company at Playhouse Square, deconstructed the play in an adaptation entitled Perhaps, Pericles. Four actors in search of Shakespeare was the nub of this 2013 production.
- There have been four important productions of "Pericles" mounted at The Stratford Festival in Stratford, Canada. In 1973 there was a production directed by Jean Gascon that was repeated in 1974; there were later productions, respectively in 1986, 2003, and the latest in 2015. Both the 1973 and 1974 productions had the same cast, headed by Stratford stars, Nicholas Pennel and Martha Henry; the 1986 production was directed by Richard Ouzounian and starred Geraint Wyn Davies and Goldie Semple; the 2003 production was directed by Leon Rubin and starred Jonathan Goad; and in 2015 the director was Scott Wentworth and starred Evan Buliung. The 2015 production was filmed by CBC Television for the Shakespearean film series CBC Presents the Stratford Festival.
- The Theatre for a New Audience in New York City staged a production in early 2016 directed by Trevor Nunn with Christian Camargo as Pericles. Nunn utilized a generally bare stage but with more elaborate and ornate costuming from different eras and cultures. Nunn shifted some scenes around and brought in prose text from George Wilkins' Pericles story (thought to be the co-author of this play with Shakespeare) in order to improve the pace and clarity of the story. The production included folk songs and dances interwoven throughout the play as was often done in the original Shakespeare productions.
- The 2016 Guthrie Theater production directed by Joseph Haj was a collaboration with the Oregon Shakespeare Festival. Unlike most scholars, Haj believes that the play was written entirely by Shakespeare, calling it "deep" and "mature". Rather than an elaborate set, the play uses visual projections on a large screen; this is particularly effective for the shipwreck scene and the "literal wall of water... coming right at you.". Musicians effectively set the mood, create tension, and underscore the theme.
- The BBC has broadcast two radio adaptations of the play: one in 2005 starring Tom Mannion as Pericles and one in 2017 with Willard White as Gower, Paapa Essiedu as Pericles and Adjoa Andoh as Dionyza/Lychorida.
- In August 2019, Dan Dawes directed a stripped back, multi-roling production of the play for the company Idle Discourse, which focused heavily on bold storytelling and physical comedy. The production initially ran at London's Upstairs at the Gatehouse in Highgate before transferring to the Baroque Palace Theatre in the Palace of Valtice, Czech Republic, the following month. Tom Grace starred as Pericles, Adam Elms as Gower, and Lauren Cornelius as Marina.
- In 2020, members of Mary Baldwin University's MFA company model performed the show as part of Fireside Shakespeare Company's 2020–2021 season. Directed by Millie Koncelik, the show was a small-scale production in which five actors portrayed all the characters. Due to the restraints of the pandemic, the production was masked and socially distanced. As part of the show's concept, each of the five actors in turn performed one of Gower's choruses throughout the show.
- In December 2022, The Shakespeare Theatre Company Academy produced a version adapted by Alec Wild and Gregory Keng Strasser and directed by Strasser in repertory with All's Well That End's Well at Theatre XX.
- The Royal Shakespeare Company have completed a July–September 2024 run of Pericles at Stratford-upon-Avon, and this production has gone on tour to Chicago Shakespeare Theater from 20 October to 8 December 2024. The production is directed by Tamara Harvey with Alfred Enoch as Pericles.
