= Estate satire =

Estate satire is a genre of writing from 14th-century medieval literary works. The three medieval estates were the clergy (those who prayed), the nobility (those who fought), and the peasantry (those who labored). These estates were the major social classes of the time. The traditional estates were specific to men (although the clergy also included nuns); women were considered a class in themselves, the best-known example being Geoffrey Chaucer's Wife of Bath. Estate satire praised the glories and purity of each class in its ideal form, but was also used as a window to show how society had gotten out of hand. The Norton Anthology of English Literature describes the duty of estate satires: "They set forth the functions and duties of each estate and castigate the failure of the estates in the present world to live up to their divinely assigned social roles."

The First Estate, the Church, consisted of those who ran the Catholic church and part of the country. They were the recipients of the tithe or the 10% tax given to the Church.

The Second Estate was the nobility or aristocracy, including royalty but not including the King. They were never taxed but could collect taxes from the Third Estate, and had other special privileges.

The Third Estate, the Commons, was the largest, consisting of around 98% of the population. The commons included everyone who did not belong to the first two estates, primarily rural peasants and the urban bourgeois or middle class. They had none of the privileges or luxuries that the first two estates enjoyed, although the rise of capitalism in the late 14th century resulted in the bourgeois gaining relatively more power.

Among 14th-century English authors, John Gower, William Langland, and Geoffrey Chaucer were three of the most prominent writers of the time to include estate satire in their works. Gower was aggressive in his approach; Chaucer was more subtle and more successful, making himself to be the fool of the joke and subverting many of the conventions of the genre. Several Medieval authors used estate satire to express their disgust towards the hypocrisy of the three estates and their supposedly virtuous ways.
