= John Gower =

English writer and poet (c.1330–1408)

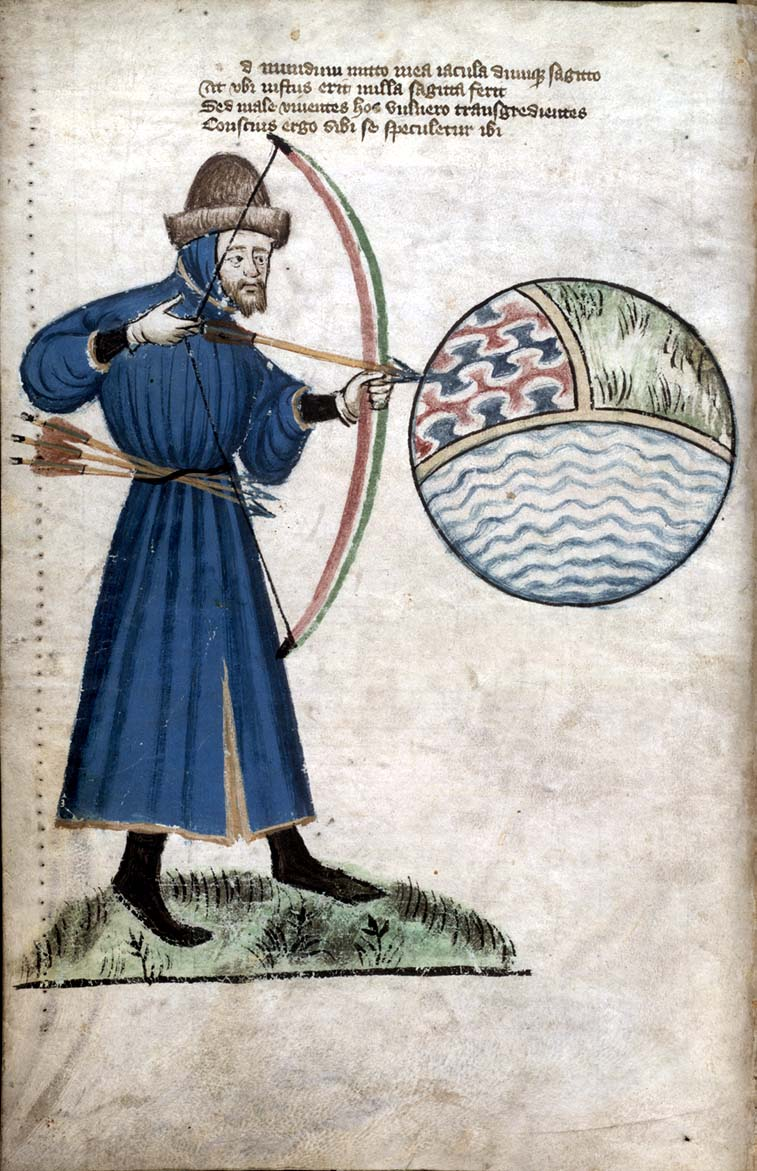
John Gower shooting the world, a sphere of earth, air, and water (from a manuscript of his works ca. 1400). The text reads: Ad mundum mitto mea iacula dumque sagitto At ubi iustus erit nulla sagitta ferit Sed male viventes hos vulnero transgredientes Conscius ergo sibi se speculetur ibi (As I shoot I send at the world these my bolts And where the just shall be no arrow may hit But those living wicked lives, the transgressors I aim to harm Thus may in this work those conscious amongst you observe themselves as they truly are)

John Gower (/ˈɡaʊ.ər/; c. 1330 – October 1408) was an English poet, a contemporary of William Langland and the Pearl Poet, and a personal friend of Geoffrey Chaucer. He is remembered primarily for three major works—the Mirour de l'Omme, Vox Clamantis, and Confessio Amantis—three long poems written in French, Latin, and English respectively, which are united by common moral and political themes.

== Life ==
Few details are known of Gower's early life. He was probably born into a family which held properties in Kent and Suffolk. Stanley and Smith use a linguistic argument to conclude that "Gower’s formative years were spent partly in Kent and partly in Suffolk". Southern and Nicolas conclude that the Gower family of Kent and Suffolk cannot be related to the Yorkshire Gowers because their coats of arms are drastically different. Macaulay and other critics have observed that he must have spent considerable time reading the Bible, Ovid, Secretum Secretorum, Petrus Riga, Speculum Speculationum, Valerius Maximus, John of Salisbury, and others.

He once met Richard II. In the prologue of the first recension of the Confessio Amantis, he tells how the king, chancing to meet him on the Thames (probably circa 1385), invited him aboard the royal barge, and that their conversation then resulted in a commission for the work that would become the Confessio Amantis. Later in life his allegiance switched to the future Henry IV, to whom later editions of the Confessio Amantis were dedicated. Much of this is based on circumstantial rather than documentary evidence, and the history of revisions of the Confessio Amantis, including the different dedications, is yet to be fully understood.

The source of Gower's income remains a mystery. He may have practised law in or around London. George Campbell Macaulay lists several real estate transactions to which Gower was a party. Macaulay's Introduction to the French Works suggests that Gower may have been a dealer in wool. This is based on remarks from Mirour d l'Omme line 25360ff. From 1365 he received ten pounds' rent for the manor of Wygebergh in Essex. From 1382 until death he received forty pounds per annum from selling Feltwell in Norfolk and Moulton in Suffolk. In 1399 Henry IV granted him a pension, in the form of an annual allowance of two pipes (= 1 tun = 240 gallons) of Gascony wine. Carlson estimates the value of the two pipes as 3 to 4 pounds wholesale or 8 pounds retail.

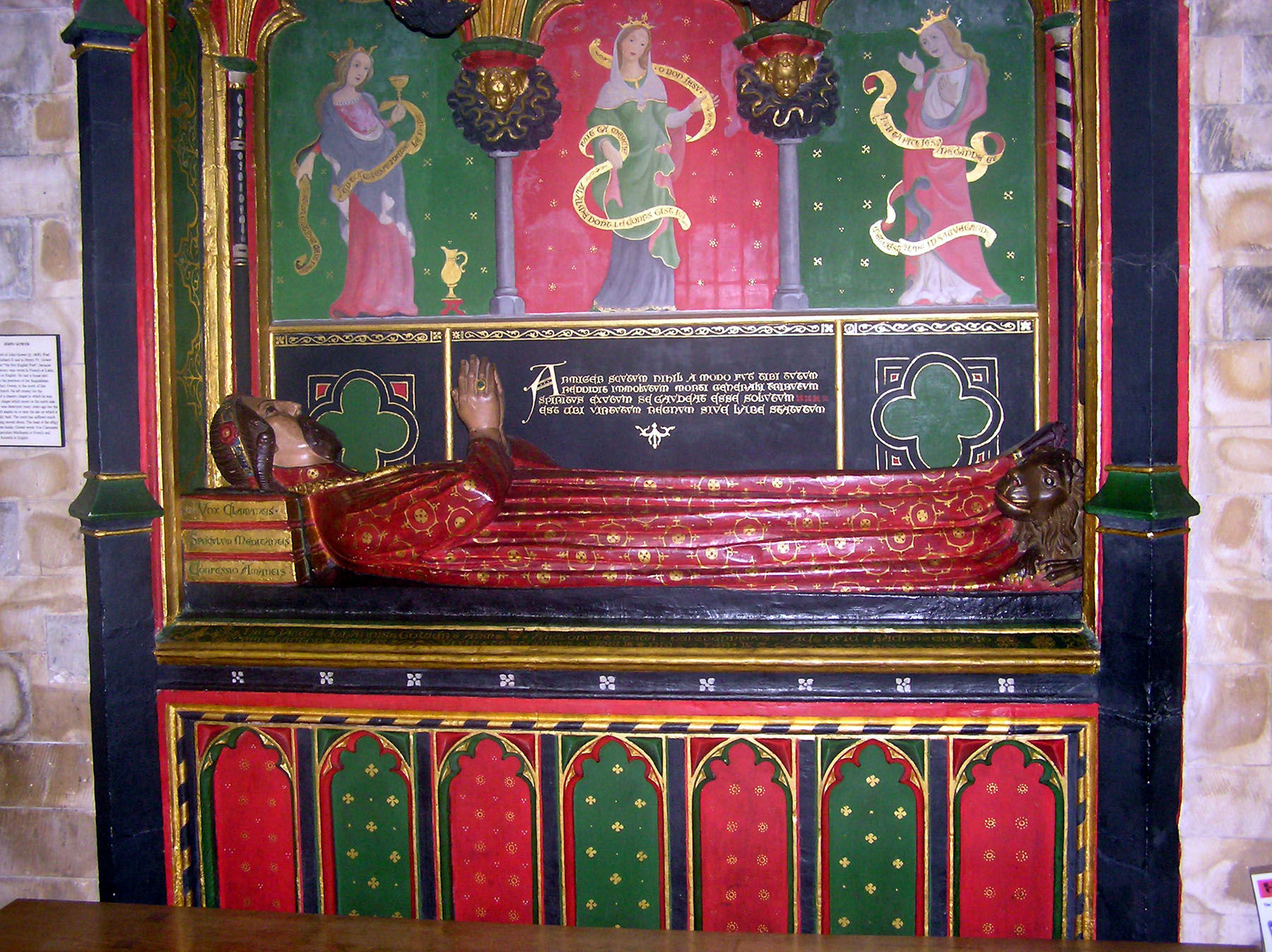
The tomb of John Gower in Southwark Cathedral

Gower's friendship with Chaucer is also well documented. When Chaucer was sent as a diplomat to Italy in 1378, Gower was one of the men to whom he gave power of attorney over his affairs in England. The two poets also paid one another compliments in their verse: Chaucer dedicated his Troilus and Criseyde in part to "moral Gower", and Gower reciprocated by placing a speech in praise of Chaucer in the mouth of Venus at the end of the Confessio Amantis (first recension VIII.2950-70). The Introduction to the Man of Law's Tale (lines 77–89) contains an apparent reference to Gower's tales of Canacee and Tyro Appolonius. Tyrwhitt (1822) believed that this offended Gower and led to the removal of Venus’ praise of Chaucer. Twentieth-century sources have more innocent reasons for the deletion.

At some point during the middle 1370s, he took up residence in rooms provided by the Priory of St Mary Overie (now Southwark Cathedral). In 1398, while living here, he married, probably for the second time: his wife was Agnes Groundolf, who survived him. In his last years, and possibly as early as 1400, he became blind.

After his death in 1408, Gower was interred in an ostentatious tomb in the Priory church (now Southwark Cathedral), where it remains today.

Macaulay provides much information and speculation about Gower. Some of his conclusions are inferences drawn from the trilingual writings of Gower. Where possible he draws upon legal records and other biographers.

== Works ==
Gower's verse is by turns religious, political, historical, and moral—though he has been narrowly defined as "moral Gower" ever since Chaucer graced him with the epithet. His primary mode is allegory, although he shies away from sustained abstractions in favour of the plain style of the raconteur.

His earliest works were probably ballades in Anglo-Norman French, some of which may have later been included in his work the Cinkante Ballades. The first work which has survived is in the same language, however: it is the Speculum Meditantis, also known by the French title Mirour de l'Omme, a poem of just under 30,000 lines, containing a dense exposition of religion and morality. According to Yeager "Gower's first intent to write a poem for the instructional betterment of king and court, at a moment when he had reason to believe advice about social reform might influence changes predictably to take place in an expanded jurisdiction, when the French and English peoples were consolidated under a single crown."

Gower's second major work, the Vox Clamantis, was written in Latin. The first book has an allegorical account of the Peasants' Revolt which begins as an allegory, becomes quite specific and ends with an allusion to William Walworth’s suppression of the rebels. Gower takes the side of the aristocracy but the actions of Richard II are described by "the captain in vain endeavoured to direct the ship’s course".Subsequent books decry the sins of various classes of the social order: priests, friars, knights, peasants, merchants, lawyers. The last two books give advice to King Richard II and express the poet's love for England. As Gower admits, much of Vox Clamantis was borrowed from other authors. Macaulay refers to this as "schoolboy plagiarism" Peter classifies Mirour and Vox as "complaint literature" in the vein of Langland.

His third work is the Confessio Amantis, a 30,000-line poem in octosyllabic English couplets, which makes use of the structure of a Christian confession (presented allegorically as a confession of sins against Love) as a narrative frame within which a multitude of individual tales are told. Like his previous works, the theme is very much morality, even where the stories themselves have a tendency to describe rather immoral behaviour. One scholar asserts that Confessio Amantis "almost exclusively" made Gower's "poetic reputation."

Fisher views the three major works as "one continuous work" with In Praise of Peace as a capstone. There is "movement from the courtly tone of the Cinkante Balades to the moral and philosophical tone of the Traitie." Leland (ca 1540) states "that the three works were intended to present a systematic discourse upon the nature of man and society":

They provide as organized and unified a view as we have of the social ideals on England upon the eve of the Renaissance. This view may be subsumed under the three broad headings: individual VIRTUE, legal JUSTICE, and the administrative responsibility of the KING. The works progress from the description of the origins of sin and the nature of the vices and virtues at the beginning of the Mirour de l'omme, through consideration of social law and order in the discussion of the three estates in the Mirour and Vox Clamatis, to a final synthesis of royal responsibility of Empedoclean love in the Confessio Amantis.

In later years Gower published a number of minor works in all three languages:

- the Cinkante Ballades, a series of French ballades on romantic subjects. Yeager (2011) argues that these sonnets were composed throughout Gower's lifetime.
- the English poem In Praise of Peace "is a political poem in which Gower, as a loyal subject of Henry IV, approves his coronation, admires him as the saviour of England, dilates on the evil of war and the blessing of peace, and finally begs him to display clemency and seek domestic peace" Fisher argued that it was "Gower's last important poem. It sums up the final twenty years of both his literary career and his literary achievement."
- short Latin works on various subjects with several poems addressed to the new Henry IV. According to Yeager (2005) "his final metered thoughts were in Latin, the language that Gower, like most of his contemporaries, associated with timeless authority."

Critics have speculated on which late work triggered the royal wine allowance mentioned in the Life section. Candidates are Cronica tripertita, In Praise of Peace, O Recolende or an illustrated presentation copy of Confessio with dedication to Henry IV. According to Meyer-Lee "no known evidence relates the collar or grant [of wine] to his literary activity."

== Prediction of the Peasants' Revolt ==
When Wickert was attempting to date Vox Clamantis Books Two to Seven, she found two passages which predict the revolt. One is Mirour which uses the metaphor of the stinging nettle to predict the impending catastrophe. The second is the final couplet of Vox Clamantis Book Five Chapter 10. This predicts trouble in a short time. Gower's warnings and call for reform were ignored both before and after the events of 1381.

== Chaucer influence ==
Chaucer used octosyllabic lines in The House of Fame but eschewed iambic rhythm. He "left it to Gower to invent the iambic tetrameter, and to later centuries of poets to solve the problems of its potential monotony; he himself merely polished the traditional Middle English short line."

Fisher concludes that they were living near each other in the period 1376 to 1386. They influenced each other in several ways:

1. They imported Italian models and learned "to count beats in such a way as to produce a regular number of syllables." This led via Mirour to the iambic tetrameter of Confessio and Chaucer's pentameter.
2. After 1376 both poets turned from love poetry to more serious topics. For Gower this was the "moralistic social complaint in the Mirour d l'omme and Vox Clamatis, while Chaucer wrestled more painfully in the House of Fame and Parliament of Fowls with the relation between the style and substance of courtly poetry and social satire."
3. Gower "took the risk of composing in English only after Chaucer had achieved success and fame with Troilus and Criseyde."
4. Most of the individuals in the General Prologue are members of classes criticized in Mirour and Vox Clamantis. Chaucer has omitted the higher ranks of the secular and clerical hierarchies. The language and the introduction of satire are the invention of Chaucer.
5. Gower is criticized in the Introduction to The Man of Law's Tale. Some commentators have interpreted these remarks to indicate a breach between the two poets. Fisher interprets them and along with the details of the Tale as a friendly competition between two poets.

== Manuscripts ==
Sebastian Sobecki's discovery of the early provenance of the trilingual Trentham manuscript reveals Gower as a poet who was not afraid to give Henry IV stern political advice. Sobecki also claims to have identified Gower's autograph hand in two manuscripts.

== Critical reception ==
Gower's poetry has had a mixed critical reception. In the 16th century, he was generally regarded alongside Chaucer as the father of English poetry. In the 18th and 19th centuries, however, his reputation declined, largely on account of a perceived didacticism and dullness, along with the perception that Gower was a servile follower of the Lancastrian regime. Thus the American poet and critic James Russell Lowell claimed Gower "positively raised tediousness to the precision of science". After publication of Macaulay's edition (1901) of the complete works, he has received more recognition, notably by C. S. Lewis (1936), Wickert (1953), Fisher (1964), Yeager (1990) and Peck (2006). However, he has not obtained the same following or critical acceptance as Geoffrey Chaucer.

== List of works ==
- Mirour de l'Omme, or Speculum Hominis, or Speculum Meditantis (French, c.1376–1379)
- Vox Clamantis (Latin, c.1377–1381)
- Confessio Amantis (English, c.1386–1393)
- Traité pour Essampler les Amants Marietz (French, 1397)
- Cinkante Balades (French, 1399–1400)
- Cronica Tripertita (Latin, c.1400)
- In Praise of Peace (English, c.1400)

== See also ==
- Pericles, Prince of Tyre, a play co-written by Shakespeare, based on a story from Confessio Amantis and featuring Gower as the Chorus
- Characters named Gower appear in Henry IV Part II and Henry V but there is no reason to associate these characters with the poet.
- John Gower is the hero of A Burnable Book and The Invention of Fire, first two of a 14th-century thriller series by Bruce Holsinger.
