= Confessio Amantis =

1389 poem written by John Gower

- by John Gower
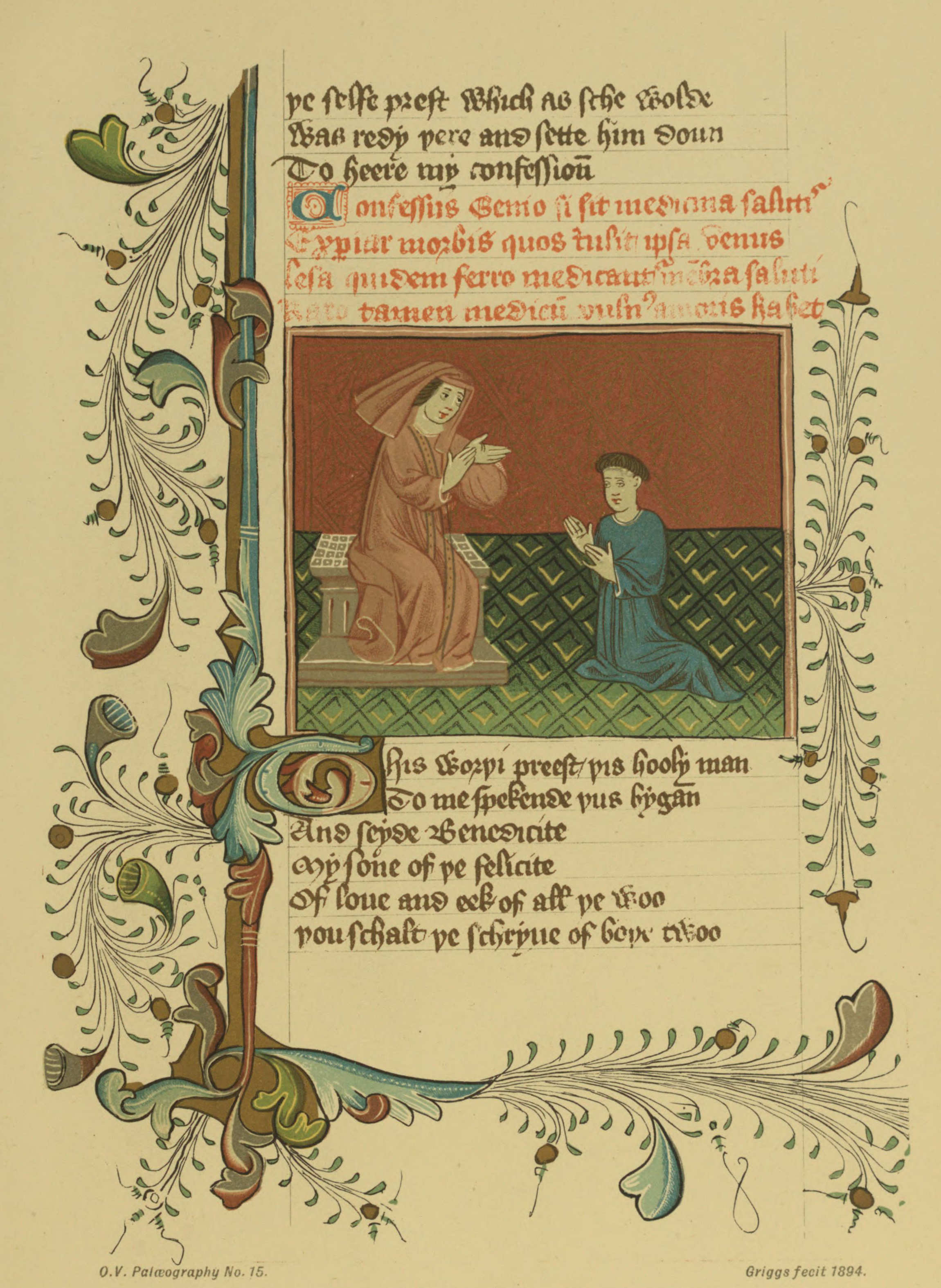
- The author and the Priest of Venus, from an MS of the Confessio Amantis ca. 1399
- Original title: Confessio Amantis (The Lover's Confession)
- Written: 1390
- Country: England
- Language: Middle English
- Meter: Octosyllable
- Lines: 33,000

Full text
- Confessio Amantis at Wikisource

Confessio Amantis ("The Lover's Confession") is a 33,000-line Middle English poem by John Gower, which uses the confession made by an ageing lover to the chaplain of Venus as a frame story for a collection of shorter narrative poems. According to its prologue, it was composed at the request of Richard II. It stands with the works of Chaucer, Langland, and the Pearl poet as one of the great works of late 14th-century English literature. The Index of Middle English Verse shows that in the era before the printing press it was one of the most-often copied manuscripts (59 copies) along with The Canterbury Tales (72 copies) and Piers Plowman (63 copies).

In genre it is usually considered a poem of consolation, a medieval form inspired by Boethius' Consolation of Philosophy and typified by works such as Pearl. Despite this, it is more usually studied alongside other tale collections with similar structures, such as the Decameron of Boccaccio, and particularly Chaucer's Canterbury Tales, with which the Confessio has several stories in common.

== Textual history ==
Composition of the work probably began circa 1386, and the work was completed in 1390. The prologue of this first recension recounts that the work was commissioned by Richard II after a chance meeting with the royal barge on the River Thames; the epilogue dedicates the work to Richard and to Geoffrey Chaucer, as the "disciple and poete" of Venus. This version of the work saw widespread circulation, perhaps due to its royal connections (Peck 2000), and was the most popular of Gower's works, with at least 32 of the 49 surviving manuscripts of the Confessio containing this version.

The subsequent history is complicated and not entirely certain. Much revision took place, some of it by Gower and some probably by individual scribes. What follows is the conventional history as formulated by Macaulay (1901:xxi). The true story is probably somewhat more complicated (see e.g. Watt 2003:11–13 for an overview of recent work).

According to Macaulay (1901:xxii), a second recension was issued in about 1392, with some significant changes: most notably, most references to Richard are removed, as is the dedication to Chaucer, and these are replaced with a new dedication to Henry of Lancaster, the future Henry IV. It has naturally been commonly assumed that this reflects a shift in the poet's loyalties, and indeed there are signs that Gower was more attached to Henry's party from this period; but while he did attack Richard later in the decade, there is no evidence that these early changes indicate any particular hostility towards either Richard or Chaucer (Peck 2000), and it has been argued that the revision process was not politically motivated at all, but begun rather because Gower wished to improve the style of the work (Burrows 1971:32), with the dedications being altered as a purely secondary matter. Pearsall (2004:94) assigns a "dubious status" to Macaulay's ‘second recension’ and has other comments on Macaulay's account of the text.

A third and final recension was published in 1393, retaining the dedication to Henry. While only a few manuscripts of this version survive, it has been taken as representing Gower's final vision for the work, and is the best-known version, having served as the basis of all modern editions.

== Style ==
Gower's previous works had been written in Anglo-Norman French and Latin. It is not certain why he chose to write his third long poem in English; the only reason Gower himself gives is that "fewe men endite In oure englyssh" (prol.22–23). It has been suggested that it was the influence of Chaucer, who had in part dedicated his Troilus and Criseyde to Gower, that persuaded him that the vernacular was a suitable language for poetry, and the influence of Chaucer's Legend of Good Women has been detected in the Confessio (Macaulay 1908:sec 23).

With the exception of a 74 line letter "unto cupid and to venus" in Book VIII, Gower did not adopt the new pentameter with which Chaucer had recently been experimenting, and which was in the 15th century to become the standard metre for English rhyme. He retained instead the octosyllabic line that had previously been the standard form for English poetry, and wrote it in couplets, rather than in the stanzas he had employed in his previous works. Gower characterised his verse in the Confessio as the plain style.

This decision has not always met with appreciation, the shorter lines being sometimes viewed as lending themselves to monotonous regularity, but Gower's handling of the metre has usually been praised. Macaulay (1901:xvi, 1908:sec 33) finds his style technically superior to Chaucer's, admiring "the metrical smoothness of his lines, attained without unnatural accent or forced order of words". The work's most enthusiastic advocate was C. S. Lewis, who, though admitting that the work can be "prosaic" and "dull" in places, identifies a "sweetness and freshness" in the verse and praises its "memorable precision and weight" (Lewis 1936:201). Not all assessments have been so positive: Burrow (1971:31) describes it as "not so much plain as threadbare", and notes that the selective quotations of previous critics have served to draw attention to sections that are better poetry, but unrepresentative of the work as a whole.

== Language ==
Gower's language differs from the London dialect in which Chaucer wrote. Samuels and Smith (1988:15) observed that there are several ways in which his language differs from that of Chaucer.

One group suggests a Kentish influence:

1. contracted 3rd person singular present indicative verbs, used to a far greater extent than in Chaucer, e.g.
2. ie-spellings as the reflex (modern form) of OE ē, ēo, and OF ē e.g. The principal area for these spellings is W Essex and W Kent.
3. selver ‘silver’ a Southern and SW Midlands form.
4. soster ’sister’ : primarily Kentish and South-Western.
5. þerwhiles (þat), "while" : Kentish, with a narrow belt from there into the South Midlands, including earlier London texts.

Another group is definitely East Anglian:

1. boþen ‘both’ found in Norfolk, Suffolk and an area in the W Midlands.
2. ȝoue ‘given’: primarily an Eastern form.
3. ) -h- as in myhte, hyhe, yhen

Gower's family owned land in SW Suffolk (Kentwell Hall) and had associations with NW Kent (Brabourne?).(Lee in DNB) Thus "Gower’s dialect is essentially based on the two regional dialects of Kent and Suffolk, not that of London, as Macaulay(1901:cxxx, 1908:sec 32) thought."

Some well known differences between Chaucer and Gower are explained by conclusion that Gower is associated with Kent and Suffolk.

1. The treatment of reflexes of OE ỹ : Chaucer uses i, y normally but e occasionally in rhyme. Gower’s practice is the opposite -e more commonly in mid-line, but i, y in rhyme. …
2. The present participle: Gower’s form, -ende, was a minor variant in Kent where the main form was -ynde, and in the mid-fourteenth-century London dialect where the main form was -ande. Chaucer, who must equally have grown up using some form in -nde (-ande or -ende), adopted the more progressive -ynge, but Gower’s persistence with -ende can be explained only by reference to the Suffolk stratum in his language.

Smith (2004:65) concludes that despite these regional features "Gower was evidently part of the linguistic community of late-fourteenth-century London." Gower's vocabulary is educated, with extensive use of French and Latin loans, some of them apparently original; for example, the Confessio is the earliest work in which the word "history" is attested in English (OED also Middle English Dictionary). That the work was aimed at a similarly educated audience is clear from the inclusion of Latin epigraphs at the start of each major section.

== Structure and argument ==
The Confessio is divided into a prologue and eight books, which are divided thematically. The narrative structure is overlaid on this in three levels: the external matter, the narrative frame, and the individual tales which make up the bulk of the work.

=== External matter ===
The external matter comprises the prologue, which spills over briefly into the start of Book 1 and an epilogue at the end of Book 8. Unlike the bulk of the Confessio, these have much in common with Gower's previous works (Pearsall 1966:475). In the prologue he details at some length the numerous failings he identifies in the three estates (government, church, and people) of his time. This section ends with an account of the dream of Nebuchadnezzar (which draws on a similar passage in the Vox Clamantis), identifying the statue's feet of iron mixed with clay with the medieval world that Gower perceives as hopelessly divided and in danger of imminent collapse. Tens of thousands of lines later, the epilogue returns to these concerns, again touching on the matters Gower believes each estate needs most urgently to attend to.

In this context, the plan of the work given in the prologue is one of the most-quoted passages of the poem:

Bot for men sein, and soth it is,
That who that al of wisdom writ
It dulleth ofte a mannes wit
To him that schal it aldai rede,
For thilke cause, if that ye rede,
I wolde go the middel weie
And wryte a bok betwen the tweie,
Somewhat of lust, somewhat of lore...

(prol.12–19)

This is essentially what he does; the external matter and parts of the narrative frame, together with some long digressions (most notably the whole of Book 7, discussed below) make up the "lore", while the majority of the tales are wholly concerned with "lust".

=== Narrative frame ===
The frame story as such is easily summarised. The narrator of this section, conventionally referred to as Amans or the Lover, wanders through a forest in May, as medieval lovers typically do, and despairs at his lack of success. He invokes Venus and Cupid, who promptly appear and demand to know the reason for his sorrow. Upon being told that he is on the verge of dying from love, Venus insists that he be shriven, and summons her chaplain Genius to hear his confession. When at last Genius pronounces Amans absolved of all his sins against love, Venus cures him of his infatuation.

As the work's title implies, therefore, the bulk of the work is devoted to Amans' confession. This broadly follows the pattern of Christian confessions of the time. Genius leads Amans through the seven deadly sins, interpreting them in the context of the courtly love tradition. He explains the various aspects of each one with exempla, and requires Amans to detail any ways in which he has committed them. The design is that each book of the poem shall be devoted to one sin, and the first six books follow the traditional order for the first six sins: pride, envy, wrath, sloth, avarice, and gluttony.

At this point, however, Gower breaks his form and digresses: at the end of Book 6 Amans requests that Genius give him a break from the confession and teach him wisdom instead, and Genius responds in Book 7 by discoursing at length on the education given by Aristotle to Alexander the Great. In Gower's hands this becomes a treatise on good kingship, and it is in this book that it is most obvious how the work is intended to answer the royal commission. This notwithstanding, the digression, and the consequent flaw in an otherwise strict plan, is the most frequently criticised aspect of the poem's structure (see e.g. Pearsall 1966:476).

Book 8 returns to the confession. According to the traditional system, the final sin should be lechery, but since this can hardly be considered a sin against Venus, the topic of the final book is narrowed to the single perversion of incest. Though this is one sin Amans is innocent of, Genius contrives to fill a book nonetheless by telling the longest and best-known story in the Confessio, namely Apollonius of Tyre (VIII.271–2008).

=== The tales ===
The treatment given to individual stories varies widely. The Apollonius is nearly 2,000 lines long, but at the other extreme, the distinction between tale and allusion is hard to define; for example, summaries of the story of Troilus and Criseide appear in three places (II.2456–2458, IV.7597–7602, VIII.2531–2535), but none can really be described as a "tale". It follows that it is hard to produce a definite figure for the number of tales in the Confessio. Even excluding the very shortest, however, there are over 100 individual stories (Macaulay 1908:sec 24), making them more numerous than the strict 100 of the Decameron, and much more so than the Canterbury Tales or the Legend of Good Women.

None of Gower's tales are original. The source he relies on most is Ovid, whose Metamorphoses was ever a popular source of exempla; others include the Bible and various other classical and medieval writers, of whom Macaulay (1908:sec 29) lists Valerius Maximus, Statius, Benoît de Sainte-Maure (the Roman de Troie), Guido delle Colonne (Historia destructionis Troiae), Godfrey of Viterbo, Brunetto Latini, Nicholas Trivet, the Romans des sept sages, the Vita Barlaam et Josaphat, and the Historia Alexandri Magni.

The best-known tales are those that have analogues in other English writers, since these are often studied for comparison. These include the Apollonius, which served as a source for the Shakespearean Pericles, and the tales shared with Chaucer, such as the tales of Constance (II.587–1603, also told by the Man of Law) and Florent (I.1407–1875, also told by the Wife of Bath).

== Reception ==
The Confessio was apparently popular in its own time; its 49 surviving manuscripts suggest a popularity about halfway between Chaucer's Canterbury Tales (80 copies) and Troilus and Criseyde (16 copies). Macaulay (1900: vii) claims that it was the first English book to be translated into a foreign language. Nonetheless, Gower, perhaps more than any poet of his period, has suffered through his close association with Chaucer, who as the preeminent maker of the English Middle Ages overshadows his peers in the same way that Shakespeare dominates the turn of the 17th century. And despite this apparent popularity, critical reactions to the work have often been unfavourable.

In the fifteenth century, Gower and Chaucer were invariably regarded together as the founders of English poetry. John Lydgate praised "Gower Chaucers erthly goddes two", The Kingis Quair was dedicated to "Gowere and chaucere, that on the steppis satt/ of rethorike", and George Ashby called Chaucer, Gower and Lydgate "premier poetes of this nacion" (quoted by Fisher, 1965: 3).

The first known criticism is an apparent reference in Chaucer's 'Man of Law's Prologue': the eponymous Man, praising Chaucer, observes that

no word ne writeth he
Of thilke wikke ensample of Canacee
That loved hir owene brother synfully—
Of swiche cursed stories I say fy!—
Or ellis of Tyro Appollonius,
How that the cursed kyng Antiochus
Birafte his doghter of hir maydenhede,
That is so horrible a tale for to rede

(Canterbury Tales, II.77–84: Bradley et al. 1988)

Both these examples are references to the Confessio (Canace is III.143–336), and it has sometimes been thought that this passage was the direct cause of the removal of the dedication to Chaucer from the later editions of the work (see "Textual History" above). This veiled criticism of the Confessio's immoral stories is not necessarily inconsistent with Chaucer's famous dubbing of his friend "Moral Gower"; that passage, in Chaucer's Troilus, was likely written before Gower even began the Confessio.

Later generations have been equally unkind. The influential assessment of Puttenham (1589:50) found Gower's English verse inadequate in every respect:

Gower [...] had nothing in him highly to be commended, for his verse was homely and without good measure, his wordes strained much deale out of the French writers, his ryme wrested, and in his inuentions small subtilitie: the applications of his moralities are the best in him, and yet those many times very grossely bestowed, neither doth the substance of his workes sufficiently aunswere the subtiltie of his titles.

By the 19th century, the Confessio was regarded by some as an established "monument of dulness and pedantry" (quoted by Coffman 1945:52). While Macaulay (1901:x-xxi, 1908:sec 28) was cautiously appreciative, his contemporary Crawshaw (1907:61) attributed to the work "a certain nervelessness or lack of vigor, and a fatal inability to understand when he had said enough". Even C.S. Lewis, who has been quoted above admiring the style of the work, was unconvinced by its structure, describing the epilogue as "a long and unsuccessful coda" (Lewis 1936:222).

Gower has also been given his share of appreciation. A 15th-century treatise printed by Caxton describes "his bookes, called Confessionalle" as

Ful of sentence / set ful fructuosly
That hym to rede / shal gyue you corage
He is so ful of fruyt, sentence and langage

(Book of Curtesye, 327–329: Furnivall 1868)

In some cases he is praised and damned at once; Jonson (1640) considers him dangerously attractive, and liable to damage young writers who might be tempted to imitate his style:

...beware of letting them taste Gower, or Chaucer at first, lest falling too much in love with Antiquity, and not apprehending the weight, they grow rough and barren in language onely

Peck (2000) interprets this as unambiguous praise. And even the structure of his work has been declared perfect by some: Coffman (1945:58) argues that

[it] has a large integrity and unity based on a defense of [Gower's] ethical scheme for the universe... Gower tells in the Prologue exactly what he is going to do. He does it well. It is worth doing. And he recapitulates in the Epilogue.

Watt (2003:11) sums up the divided critical reactions as "reflecting ... the complexity of both the poem itself, which invites conflicting interpretations and contradictory reactions, and its textual history".

== Legacy ==
To his contemporaries, Gower's work was generally as well known as the poetry of Chaucer: Caxton printed Gower's work alongside Chaucer's, and Gower became part of the early canon of English literature. But it was Chaucer's works which became the model for future poets, and the legacy of the Confessio has suffered as a result. It is hard to find works that show signs of direct influence: the only clear example is Shakespeare's Pericles, where the influence is conscious borrowing: the use of Gower's characteristic octosyllabic line for the character of Gower himself. The story of the brazen head, here associated with Robert Grosseteste, were later associated with his disciple Roger Bacon.

While not of immense importance as a source for later works, the Confessio is nonetheless significant in its own right as one of the earliest poems written in a form of English that is clearly recognizable as a direct precursor to the modern standard, and, above all, as one of the handful of works that established the foundations of literary prestige on which modern English literature is built.
