= George Campbell Macaulay =

English Classical scholar (1852–1915)

- Born: 6 August 1852; Hodnet, Shropshire, England
- Died: 6 July 1915 (aged 62)
- Spouse: Grace Mary Conybeare
- Children: 2 sons, 4 daughters
- Parent: Rev. Samuel Herrick Macaulay (father)

George Campbell Macaulay (6 August 1852 – 6 July 1915), also known as G. C. Macaulay, was a noted English classical scholar. His daughter was the fiction writer Rose Macaulay.

== Family ==
Macaulay was born on 6 August 1852, in Hodnet, Shropshire, England, the eldest son of Rev. Samuel Herrick Macaulay (son of Aulay Macaulay), who was a Rector in Hodnet. Their family was descended, in the male-line, from the Macaulay family of Lewis. (Note: Rev. Samuel Herrick Macaulay was the son of John Heyrick Macaulay (1799–1840). John Heyrick Macaulay was the son of Rev. Aulay Macaulay (1758–1819), vicar of Rothley, Leicestershire.) In 1878, George Campbell Macaulay married Grace Mary Conybeare, the daughter of Rev. W. J. Conybeare. Together the couple had two sons and four daughters. Their second child, Rose Macaulay (born 1881), an English author, was appointed as a DBE in 1958.

== Education, career, later life ==
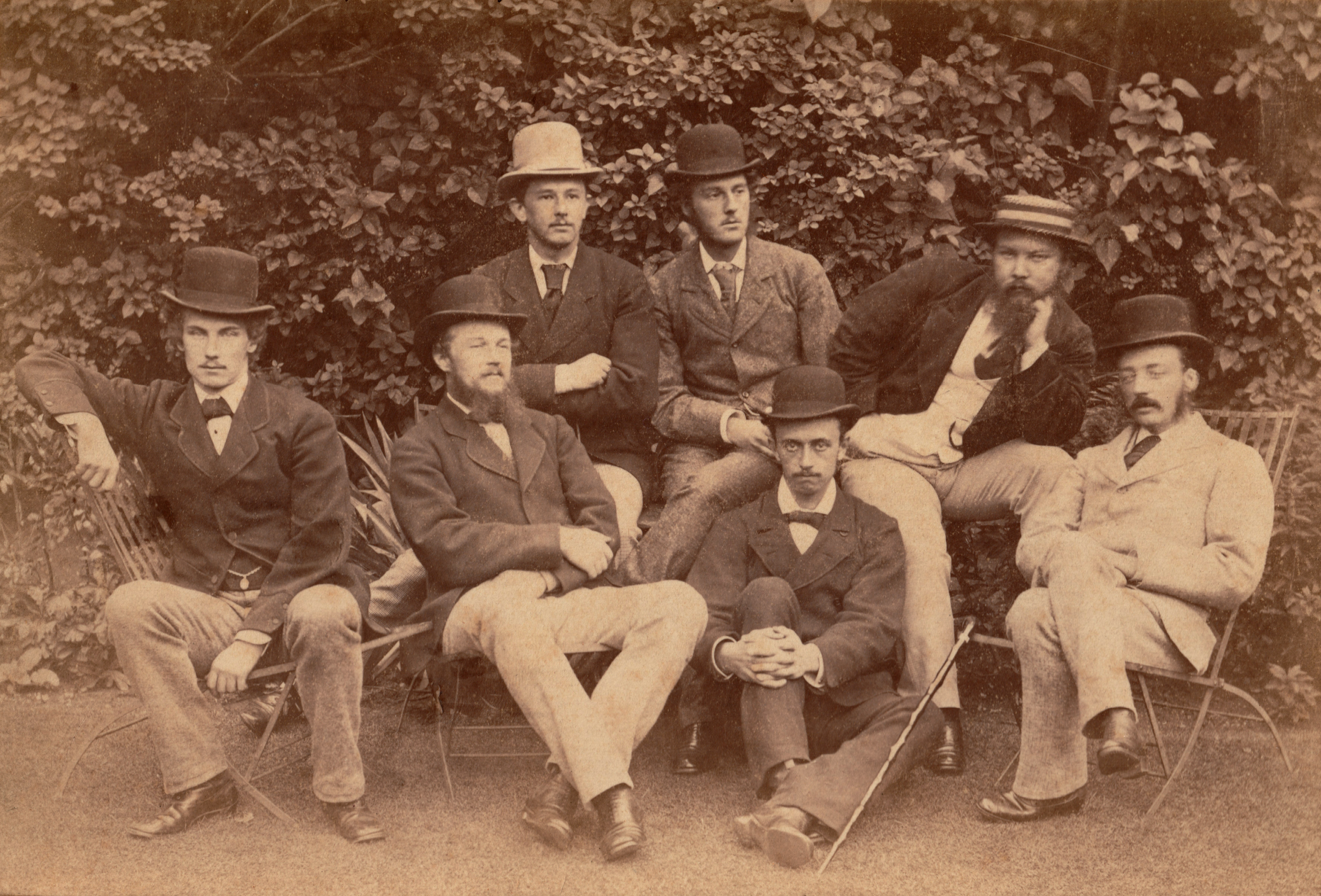
Macaulay in 1873 (far left), Shakespeare Society, Trinity College, Cambridge

Macaulay was educated at Eton and Trinity College, Cambridge. Macaulay was also a Fellow of Trinity College, Cambridge, and from 1878 to 1887 Assistant Master at Rugby School. From 1901 to 1907, he was the Professor of English Language and Literature at University College of Wales, at Aberystwyth. In 1905, he lectured on English at Cambridge. Macaulay was the editor of the Modern English Review (English Department). For a time, he and his young family lived in Varezze, a fishing village in Italy, due to a female family member's poor health. He also resided at Southernwood, Great Shelford, Cambridgeshire, and died there on 6 July 1915.

== Publications ==
Macaulay had a number of publications, of which the following can be freely read and downloaded at the Internet Archive.

- Herodotus (1890). Macaulay, G. C. (ed.). The History of Herodotus, translated into English. Vol. 1. London: Macmillan and Company.
- Herodotus (1890). Macaulay, G. C. (ed.). The History of Herodotus, translated into English. Vol. 2. London: Macmillan and Company.
- Tennyson, Alfred (1892). Macaulay, G. C. (ed.). Gareth and Lynette, with introduction and notes. London: Macmillan and Company.
- Tennyson, Alfred (1893). Macaulay, G. C. (ed.). The Holy Grail. London: Macmillan and Company.
- Tennyson, Alfred (1895). Macaulay, G. C. (ed.). Guinevere. London: Macmillan and Company.
- Herodotus (1896). Macaulay, G. C. (ed.). Herodotus: Book III. London: Macmillan and Company.
- Arnold, Matthew (1896). Macaulay, G. C. (ed.). Poems by Matthew Arnold, selected and edited. London: Macmillan and Company.
- Macaulay, G. C., ed. (1899). The Complete Works of John Gower, edited from the manuscripts with introductions, notes, and glossaries. Vol. 1. Oxford: The Clarendon Press. French Works
- Macaulay, G. C., ed. (1901). The Complete Works of John Gower, edited from the manuscripts with introductions, notes, and glossaries. Vol. 2. Oxford: The Clarendon Press. first half of Confessio Amantis(to V.1970)
- Macaulay, G. C., ed. (1901). The Complete Works of John Gower, edited from the manuscripts with introductions, notes, and glossaries. Vol. 3. Oxford: The Clarendon Press. second half of Confessio Amantis (from V.1970)
- Macaulay, G. C., ed. (1902). The Complete Works of John Gower, edited from the manuscripts with introductions, notes, and glossaries. Vol. 4. Oxford: The Clarendon Press. Gower biography and Latin Works
- Froissart, Jean (1908). Macaulay, G. C. (ed.). The Chronicles of Froissart. Bourchier, John. London: Macmillan and Company. ISBN 978-0-585-04908-3.
- Macaulay, G. C., ed. (1908). James Thomson. London: Macmillan and Company.
- Macaulay, George Campbell (1883). Francis Beaumont: A Critical Study. London: Kegan Paul, Trench & Company.
