= Il Filostrato =

Poem by Giovanni Boccaccio

"Il Filostrato" is a poem by the Italian writer Giovanni Boccaccio, and the inspiration for Geoffrey Chaucer's Troilus and Criseyde and, through Chaucer, the Shakespeare play Troilus and Cressida. It is itself loosely based on Le Roman de Troie, by 12th-century poet Benoît de Sainte-Maure.

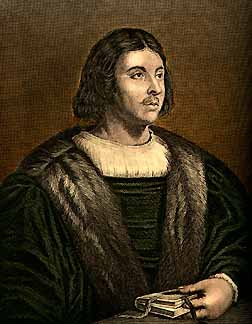
Giovanni Boccaccio

Il Filostrato is a narrative poem on a classical topic written in "royal octaves" (ottava rima) and divided into eight cantos. The title, a combination of Greek and Latin words, can be translated approximately as "laid prostrate by love". The poem has a mythological plot: it narrates the love of Troilo (Troilus), a younger son of Priam of Troy, for Criseida (Cressida or Criseyde), daughter of Calcas (Calchas).

Although its setting is Trojan, Boccaccio's story is not taken from Greek myth, but from the Roman de Troie, a twelfth-century French medieval re-elaboration of the Trojan legend by Benoît de Sainte-Maure known to Boccaccio in the Latin prose version by Guido delle Colonne (Historia destructionis Troiae).

The plot of the Filostrato can be read as a roman à clef of Boccaccio's love of "Fiammetta". Indeed, the proem suggests it. The atmosphere of the poem is reminiscent of that of the court of Naples, and the psychology of the characters is portrayed with subtle notes. There is no agreement on the date of its composition: according to some, it may have been written in 1335, whereas others consider it to date from 1340.

Boccaccio also used the name "Filostrato" for one of the three men occurring in the character of narrators in The Decameron.

== Plot summary ==
Calcas, a Trojan prophet, has foreseen the fall of the city and joined the Greeks. His daughter, Criseida, is protected from the worst consequences of her father's defection by Hector alone.

Troilo sees the lovelorn glances of other young men attending a festival in the Palladium. But almost immediately he sees a young widow in mourning. This is Criseida. Troilo falls in love with her but sees no sign of her similar feelings in him, despite his efforts to attract attention by excelling in the battles before Troy.

Troilo's close friend Pandaro (Pandarus), a cousin of Criseida, senses something is distressing him. He calls on Troilo, finding him in tears. Eventually Pandarus finds out the reason and agrees to act as go-between. Troilo, with Pandaro's help, eventually wins Criseida's hand.

During a truce, Calcas persuades the Greeks to propose a hostage exchange: Criseida for Antenor. When the two lovers meet again, Troilo suggests elopement, but Criseida argues that he should not abandon Troy and she should protect her honour. Instead she promises to meet him in ten days' time.

The Greek hero Diomedes, supervising the hostage exchange, sees the parting looks of the two lovers and guesses the truth. But he falls in love with Criseida, and seduces her. She misses the appointment with Troilo who dreams of a boar which he recognises as a symbol of Diomede. Troilo rightly interprets the dream to mean that Cressida has switched her affections to the Greek. But Pandaro persuades him that this is his imagination. Cressida, meanwhile, sends letters that pretend a continuing love for Troilo.

Troilo has his fears confirmed when his brother Deífobo (Deiphobus) returns to the city with the clothes that he has snatched in battle from Diomedes; on the garment is a clasp that belonged to Criseida.

Troilo, infuriated, goes into battle to seek out Diomedes, killing a thousand men. He and Diomedes fight many times, but never manage to kill each other. Instead Troilo's life and his suffering are ended by Achilles.
