= Laud Troy Book =

Anonymous Middle English poem dealing with the background and events of the Trojan War

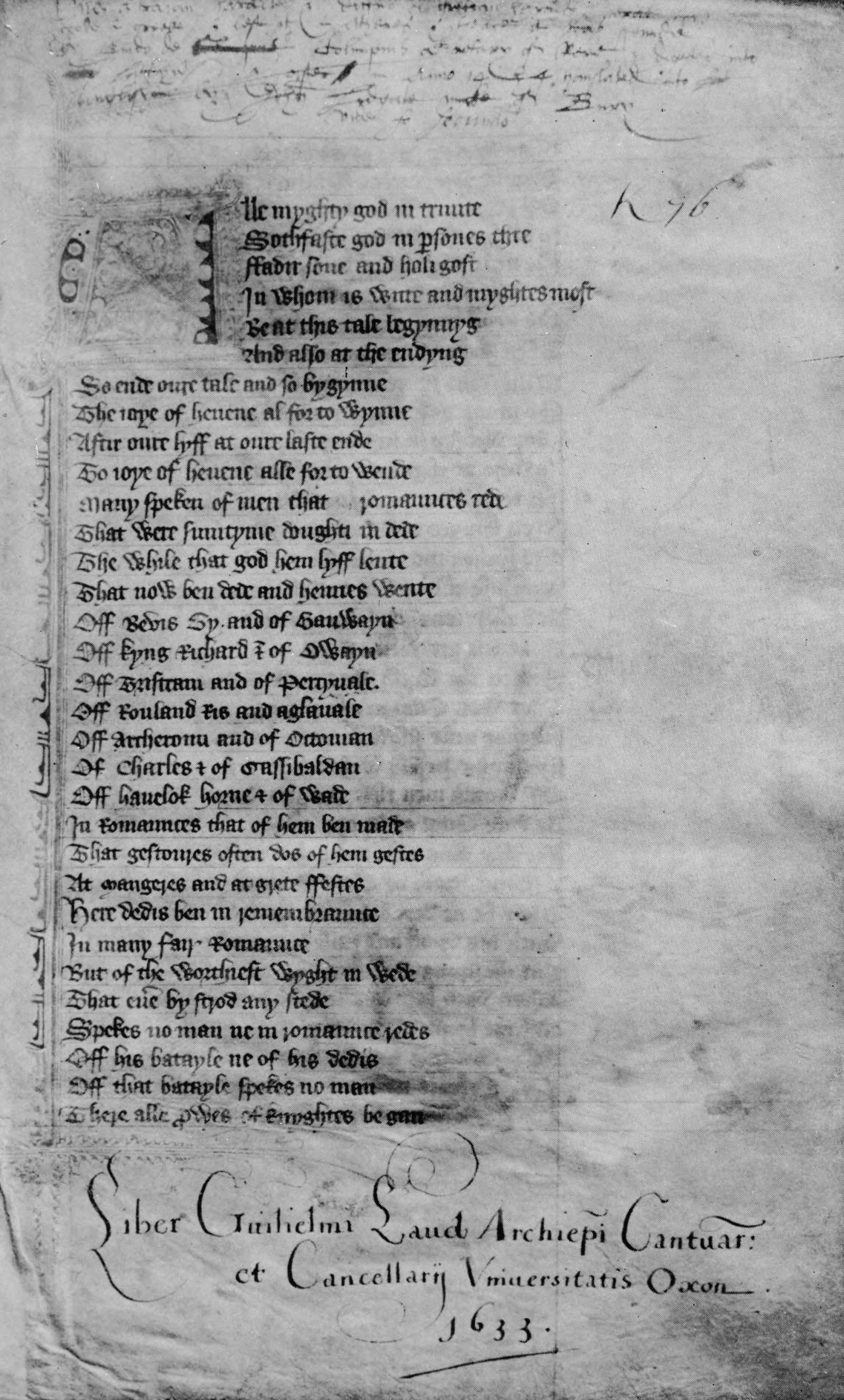
First page of the Laud Troy Book, with William Laud's ownership inscription at bottom

The Laud Troy Book is an anonymous Middle English poem dealing with the background and events of the Trojan War. Dating from around 1400 and consisting of 18,664 lines of rhyming tetrameter couplets, the untitled poem has been given a name reflecting the former ownership, by Archbishop William Laud, of the unique manuscript (Oxford, Bodleian Library MS Laud Misc. 595) in which it is found.

Based on the prose Historia destructionis Troiae of Guido delle Colonne, the Laud Troy Book recasts the tale of the fall of Troy as a chivalric romance, with Hector as the principal heroic figure. According to J. A. W. Bennett,

The epic tale has been transposed into the military modes and manners of the fourteenth century. ... The appeal must have been chiefly to a knightly audience that would respond to the sharply realized scenes, so like those that Froissart was at this very time setting down in the chronicles of the Anglo-French wars ...

Bennett also notes that "the speeches are energetic and dramatic. ... The language is homely, the similes are unhackneyed ...". Helen Phillips attributes the energetic quality of the poem to the oral, minstrel-like style of the poet, calling it "literature very much conducted as speech, in narrative as much as in dialogue, a style which both conveys and naturalizes its ancient history for an English lay, non-scholarly audience".

Although it has been characterized as "quite untouched by any breath of true poesy" (by R. K. Root) and "rough, often deficient in grammar" (by Dorothy Kempe), it has also been called "the most interesting of the Troy romances". R. M. Lumiansky offers the following judicious assessment of the poem:

Imagery from numerous sources is abundant and effectively used. Despite its great length, the poem is attractively presented and moves forward rapidly. One would, however, have difficulty considering it an outstanding literary accomplishment.

== Editions ==
- The Laud Troy Book: A Romance of About 1400 A.D., Now First Edited from the Unique MS. (Laud Misc. 595) in the Bodleian Library, Oxford, ed. J. Ernst Wülfing, Early English Text Society, Original Series 121, 122 (London: Kegan Paul, Trench, Trübner, 1902–03)

=== Modern English version ===
- The "Laud Troy Book": The Forgotten Troy Romance, trans. D. M. Smith, The Troy Myth in Medieval Britain 3 (2019) ISBN 978-1694627957

== See also ==
- The Seege of Troye
- Troy Book
