= Roman de Troie =

Epic poem by Benoît de Sainte-Maure

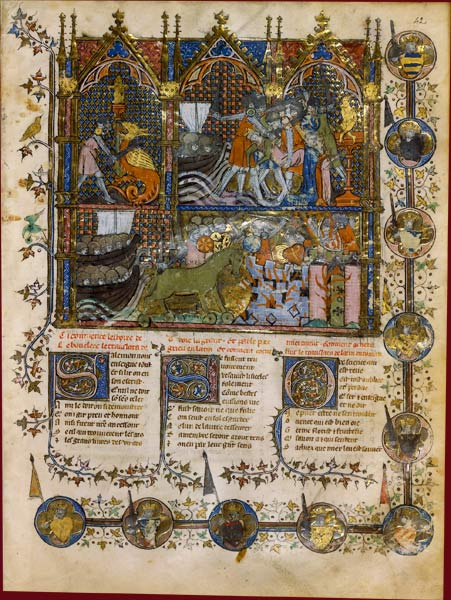
Miniature from a 14th-century manuscript of Le Roman de Troie.

Le Roman de Troie (The Romance of Troy) by Benoît de Sainte-Maure, probably written between 1155 and 1160, is a 30,000-line epic poem, a medieval retelling of the theme of the Trojan War. It inspired a body of literature in the genre called the roman antique, loosely assembled by the poet Jean Bodel as the Matter of Rome. The Trojan subject itself, for which de Sainte-Maure provided an impetus, is referred to as the Matter of Troy.

Le Roman de Troie influenced the works of many in the West, including Chaucer and Shakespeare. In the East it was translated into Greek as The War of Troy (Ο Πόλεμος της Τρωάδος), by far the longest medieval Greek romance. Of medieval works on this subject, only Guido delle Colonne's Historia destructionis Troiae was adapted as frequently. Benoît's sources for the narrative were the Latin recensions of Dictys and Dares, and some material from the all-but-lost Latin recension that is represented now only in part, in a single, fragmentary manuscript, the Rawlinson Excidium Troie in the Bodleian Library at the University of Oxford.

The audience for Benoît's famous poem consisted of aristocrats for whom this retelling (and the romans antiques in general) served a moral purpose: it was a "mirror for princes" within the larger didactic genre of mirror literature. To fulfil this audience's expectation that heroic characters should be lovers in accordance with the principles of courtly love, Benoît invented the story of the young Trojan prince Troilus's love for the daughter of Calchas, the priestly defector to the Greeks. After she is handed over to her father during a hostage exchange, she is successfully wooed by the Greek warrior Diomedes. This love triangle would be the central subject of a number of later works. In the Roman, the daughter of Calchas is called Briseida, but she is better known under a different name, becoming Criseida in Boccaccio's Il Filostrato, Criseyde in Chaucer, Cresseid in Robert Henryson's The Testament of Cresseid, and ultimately Cressida in Shakespeare's Troilus and Cressida.

The dedication of the poem, to a "riche dame de riche rei", generally believed to be Eleanor of Aquitaine, consort of Henry II, is buried deep within it, interpolated in the narrative. It serves to date the poem to the years before Eleanor's imprisonment by Henry in 1173.
