= R. K. Gordon =

Robert Kay Gordon (1887–1973) was an English scholar of medieval and early modern English literature and administrator at the University of Alberta in Canada.

In 1913, having graduated from both, the University of Toronto and Oxford, Gordon became administrator at the University of Alberta. In 1936 he was appointed as head of the Department of English and became a fellow of the Royal Society of Canada the same year. Between 1943 and 1945, he was elected Dean of the Faculty of Arts and Science. He retired from the university in 1950. His colleagues included F. M. Salter, E. Sonet and D. E. Cameron.

Gordon is quoted extensively in The Book of Imaginary Beings by Jorge Luis Borges. In the entry describing the Fastitocalon, Borges includes an extended quote from R.K. Gordon's Anglo Saxon Bestiary.

== Selected works ==
Gordon published widely in his field of English literature, displaying a wide range of interest, from Old English poetry and Chaucer to the Scottish novelists Sir Walter Scott and John Galt.

- 1918 (ed. with E. K. Broadus). English Prose from Bacon to Hardy. London. Anthology, available from the Internet Archive
- 1920. John Galt. Toronto. Available from the Internet Archive
- 1922. The Song of Beowulf. Translation into English prose. New York. Available from the Internet Archive
- 1925. Scott's "Tales of a Grandfather". New York: Dutton.
- 1926. Anglo-Saxon Poetry. London and New York. Translations of selected Old English poems. Gordon's translation of The Seafarer available online.
- 1964 (ed.). The Story of Troilus: as told by Benoît de Sainte-Maure, Giovanni Boccaccio, Geoffrey Chaucer, Robert Henryson. New York: Dutton. Versions of the Troilus legend by Benoît de Sainte-Maure, Giovanni Boccaccio, Geoffrey Chaucer and Robert Henryson.
