= Troy Book =

Middle English poem by John Lydgate

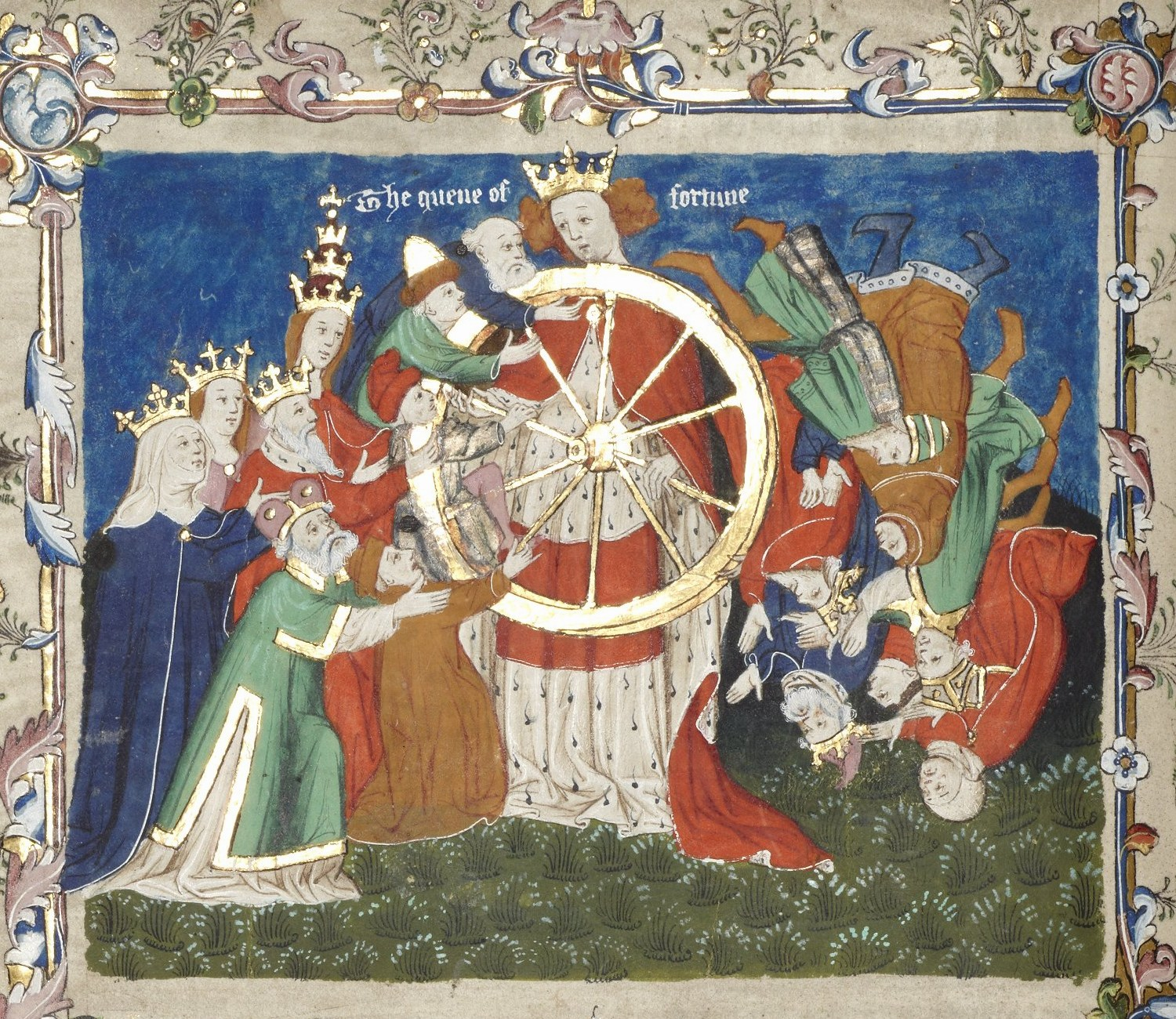
The Queen of Fortune holds the Wheel of Fortune, from an early manuscript of Troy Book

Troy Book is a Middle English poem by John Lydgate relating the history of Troy from its foundation through to the end of the Trojan War. It is in five books, comprising 30,117 lines in ten-syllable couplets. The poem's major source is Guido delle Colonne's Historia destructionis Troiae.

== Background ==
Troy Book was Lydgate's first full-scale work. It was commissioned from Lydgate by the Prince of Wales (later Henry V), who wanted a poem that would show the English language to be as fit for a grand theme as the other major literary languages,

Ywriten as wel in oure langage
As in Latyn and in Frensche it is.

Lydgate tells us that he began writing the poem at four o'clock on the afternoon of Monday, 31 October 1412; he completed it in 1420.

It has been argued that Lydgate intended Troy Book as an attempt to outdo Chaucer's Trojan romance Troilus and Criseyde, and certainly the frequent recurrence of tributes to Chaucer's excellence as a poet is a notable feature of the poem. The poem emphasizes the disastrous results of political discord and militarism, and also presents the conventional medieval themes of the power of Fortune to influence earthly affairs and the vanity of worldly things.

== Publication ==
Troy Book survives in 23 manuscripts, testifying to the popularity of the poem during the 15th century. It was printed first by Richard Pynson in 1513, and second by Thomas Marshe in 1555. A modernized version sometimes attributed to Thomas Heywood, called The Life and Death of Hector, appeared in 1614. Troy Book exercised an influence on Robert Henryson, Thomas Kyd, and Christopher Marlowe, and was one of Shakespeare's sources for Troilus and Cressida.

== Criticism ==
Modern critics have generally made moderate claims for Troy Book’s literary merit. Antony Gibbs judged the poem to be of uneven quality, adding that "its couplet form indulges Lydgate's fatal garrulity." Douglas Gray found some good writing to praise, and particularly singled out the eloquence and pathos of some of Lydgate's rhetorical laments, descriptions, and speeches.

== Reference edition ==
The reference edition of Troy Book is that by Henry Bergen, published as volumes 97, 103, 106 and 126 of the Early English Text Society Extra Series between 1906 and 1935. An excellent, abridged online edition of the "Troy Book" with substantial glosses to aid modern readers is available from the Middle English Texts Series, edited by Robert R. Edwards.

== Modern renditions ==
Two self-published modernised versions of Troy Book are available:

- John Lydgate's Troy Book: A Middle English Iliad (The Troy Myth in Medieval Britain Book 1) by D M Smith (2019 Kindle) - complete
- John Lydgate Troy Book: The Legend of the Trojan War by D.J. Favager (2019 Kindle) - complete

== Sources ==
- Gray, Douglas (1970). "Later Poetry: The Courtly Tradition". In Bolton, W. F. (ed.). The Middle Ages. Sphere History of Literature in the English Language, Volume 1. London: Sphere. ISBN 9780872261259.
- Gray, Douglas (2004). "Lydgate, John (c.1370–1449/50?)". Oxford Dictionary of National Biography (online ed.). Oxford University Press. doi:10.1093/ref:odnb/17238. (Subscription, Wikipedia Library access or UK public library membership required.)
- Jones, Terry; et al. (2004) [2003]. Who Murdered Chaucer? A Medieval Mystery. London: Methuen. ISBN 0413759202.
- Lydgate, John (1998). Edwards, Robert R. (ed.). Troy Book: Selections. Kalamazoo: Medieval Institute Publications. ISBN 9781879288997.
- Simpson, James (2004) [1986]. "Chaucer's Presence and Absence, 1400-1550". In Boitani, Piero; Mann, Jill (eds.). The Cambridge Companion to Chaucer. Cambridge: Cambridge University Press. ISBN 0521894670.
- Simpson, James (2009). "John Lydgate". In Scanlon, Larry (ed.). The Cambridge Companion to Medieval English Literature 1100-1500. Cambridge: Cambridge University Press. ISBN 9780521602587.
