= Historia destructionis Troiae =

13th century Sicilian prose narrative

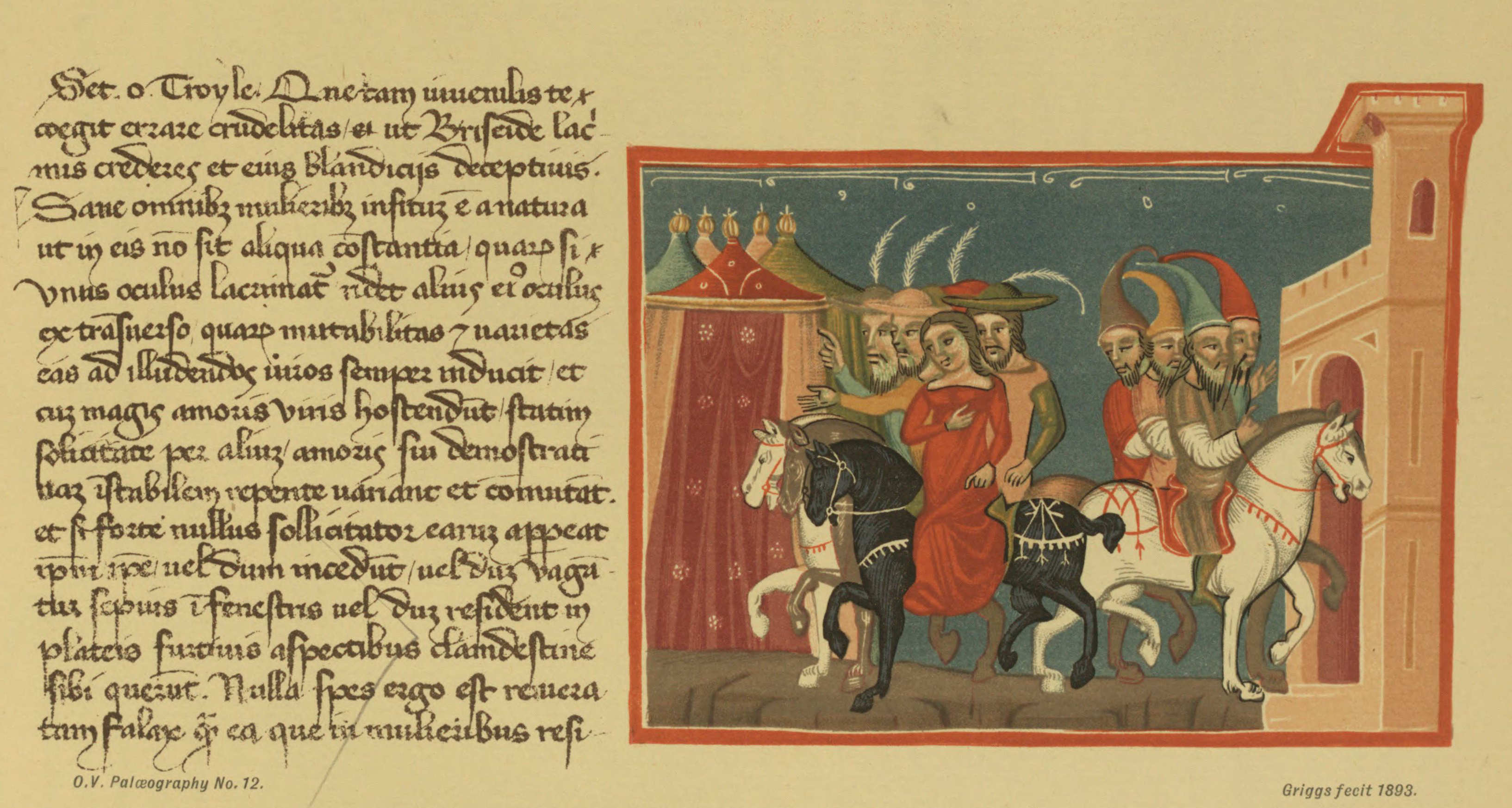
A Venetian copy of the work, ca. 1325

Historia destructionis Troiae ('History of the destruction of Troy'), also called Historia Troiana, is a Latin prose narrative written by Guido delle Colonne, a Sicilian author, in the late 13th century. Its main source was the Old French verse romance by Benoît de Sainte-Maure, Roman de Troie. The author claims that the bulk of the work was written in 71 days, from September 15 to November 25 of an unspecified year, with the full text being completed some time in 1287. As a result of this hasty composition, the work is sloppy at points and prone toward anacoluthon.

In later centuries several translations of Guido's work appeared, in Catalan, Dutch, English, French, Polish, Czech, German and Italian:

- Històries troianes, translated to Catalan by Jaume Conesa, in 1367
- John Lydgate, Troy Book, written in English around 1412-1420
- The gest hystoriale of the destruction of Troy, in English alliterative meter
- Jacques Milet, La destruction de la Troye, in French, between 1450 and 1452
- Historia (...) o zburzeniu a zniszczeniu onego sławnego a znamienitego miastha y państwa trojańskiego, in Polish, published at Kraków, 1563
- Historische, warhaffte und eigentliche Beschreibung von der alten Statt Troia, in German, published at Basel, 1599
- La storia della guerra di Troia, in Italian, published at Naples, 1665

== Editions ==
- Colonne, Guide delle (1936). Griffin, N. E. (ed.). Historia destructionis Troiae. Medieval Academy Books. Vol. 26. Cambridge: Medieval Academy of America.
