= Guido delle Colonne =

Italian judge and writer

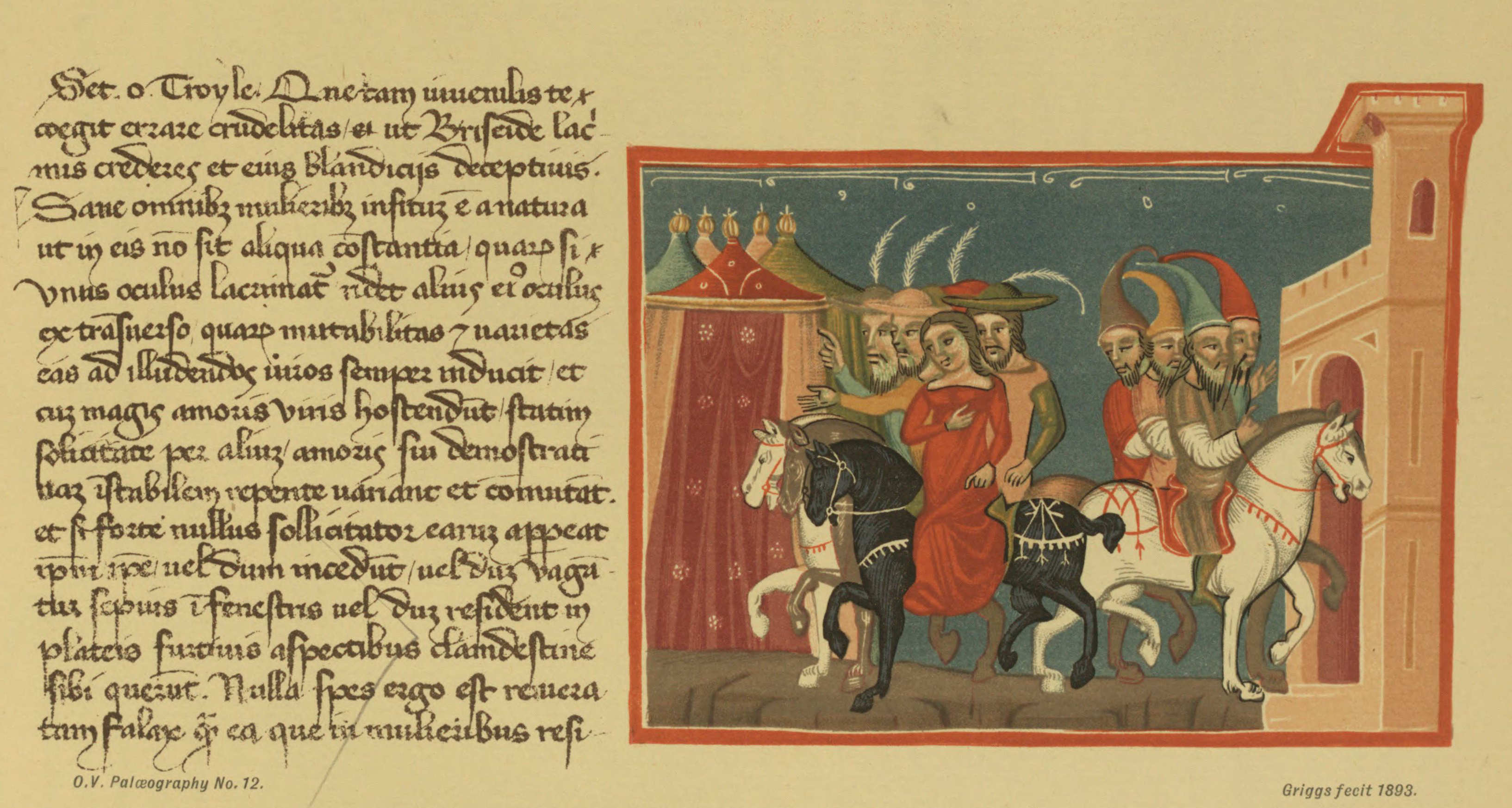
A Venetian copy of the Historia destructionis Troiae, ca. 1325

Guido delle Colonne (in Latin Guido de Columnis or de Columna) was a 13th-century Italian judge and writer, who lived in Messina. He is the author of a prose narrative of the Trojan War entitled Historia destructionis Troiae ("History of the destruction of Troy," 1287), that was based on De excidio Trojae historia written by Dares Phrygius and Ephemeridos belli Trojani written by Dictys Cretensis.

Dante (De vulgari eloquentia 2.5) named Guido as a poet in the vernacular, and five poems by him in Italian survive.
