= Benoît de Sainte-Maure =

12th-century French poet

Benoît de Sainte-Maure (French pronunciation: [bənwa də sɛ̃t moʁ]; died 1173) was a 12th-century French poet, most probably from Sainte-Maure-de-Touraine near Tours, France. The Plantagenets' administrative center was located in Chinon, west of Tours.

== Le Roman de Troie ==
His 40,000 line poem Le Roman de Troie ("The Romance of Troy"), written between 1155 and 1160, was a medieval retelling on the epic theme of the Trojan War which inspired a body of literature in the genre called the roman antique, loosely assembled by the poet Jean Bodel as the Matter of Rome. The Trojan subject itself, for which de Sainte-Maure provided an impetus, is referred to as the Matter of Troy.

== Chronique des ducs de Normandie ==
Another major work, by a Benoît, probably Benoît de Sainte-Maure, is a lengthy verse Chronique des ducs de Normandie. Its manuscript at Tours, dating to 1180–1200, is probably the oldest surviving text in Old French transcribed on the Continent. The first published edition was by Francisque Michel, 3 volumes, 1868–1844, based on the British Library manuscript. The standard edition is by Carin Fahlin (Uppsala), 3 volumes, 1951–1967, and is based on the Tours manuscript with variants from the British one.

'Beneeit' is mentioned at the end of Wace's Roman de Rou, which is also on the subject of the Dukes of Normandy:

Die en auant que dire en deit:
I'ai dit por Maistre Beneeit
Qui cest[e] oure a dire a emprise,
Com li reis l'a desour li mise.
