= Cosmographia (Bernardus Silvestris) =

Book by Bernard Silvestris

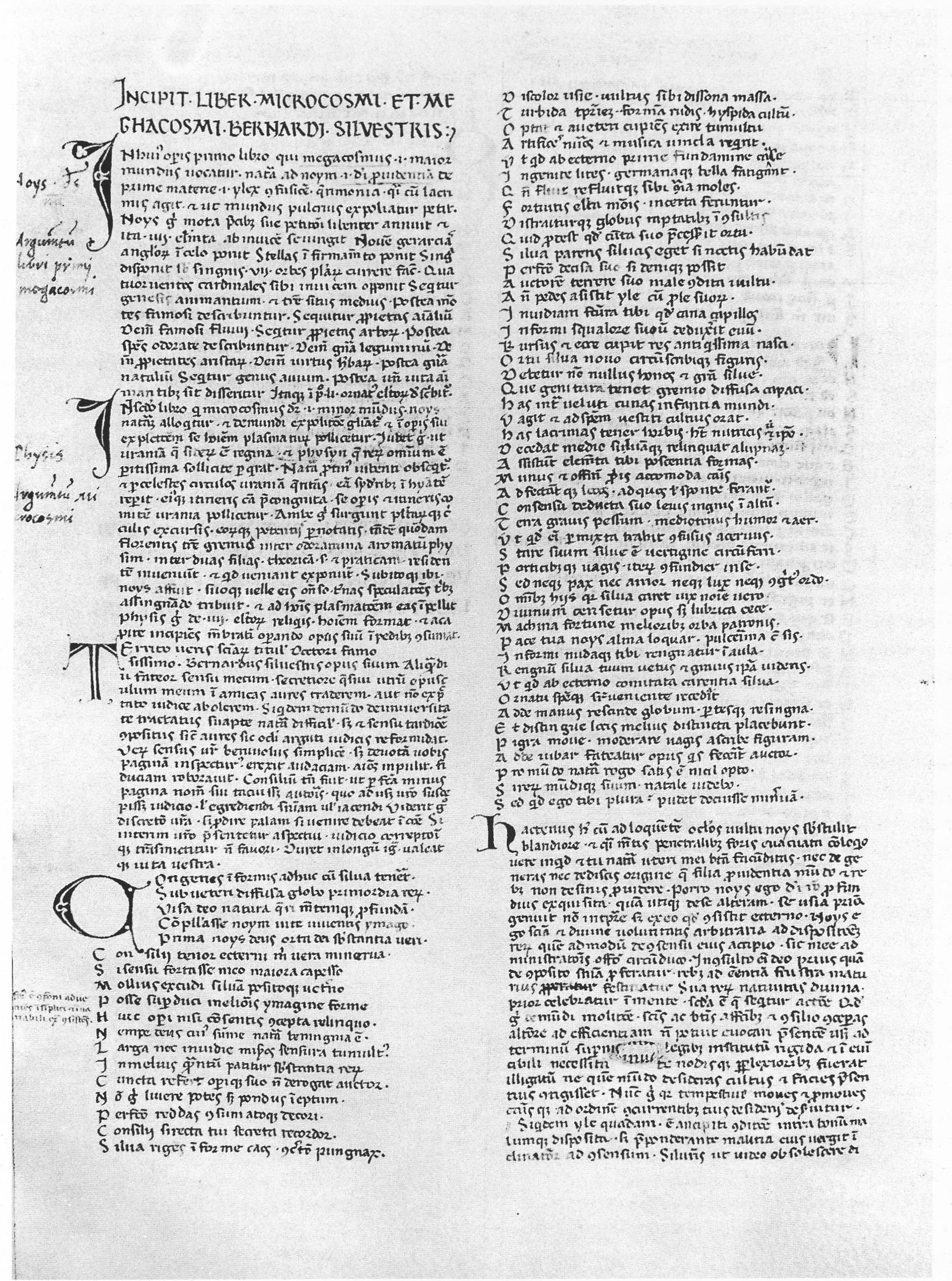
First page of the Cosmographia in a 14th-century manuscript written by Giovanni Boccaccio

Cosmographia ("Cosmography"), also known as De mundi universitate ("On the totality of the world"), is a Latin philosophical allegory, dealing with the creation of the universe, by the twelfth-century author Bernardus Silvestris. In form, it is a prosimetrum, in which passages of prose alternate with verse passages in various classical meters. The philosophical basis of the work is the Platonism of contemporary philosophers associated with the cathedral school of Chartres—one of whom, Thierry of Chartres, is the dedicatee of the work. According to a marginal note in one early manuscript, the Cosmographia was recited before Pope Eugene III when he was traveling in France (1147–48).

== Synopsis ==
The work is divided into two parts: "Megacosmus", which describes the ordering of the physical universe, and "Microcosmus", which describes the creation of man.

=== Megacosmus ===
1 (verse): Natura (Nature) complains to her mother Noys (Divine Providence; Greek νοῦς) that Hyle (Primordial Matter; Greek ὕλη), although held in check by Silva (the Latin equivalent of ὕλη), is chaotic and unformed and asks that Noys impose order and form on the confused matter.
2 (prose): Noys reveals her status as the daughter of God and asserts that the time is right for Natura's plea to be granted. She then separates out the four elements of fire, earth, water, and air from primordial matter. Seeing that the results are good, she begets the World Soul, or Endelechia (Greek ἐντελέχεια), as a bride for Mundus (World). Their marriage is the source of life in the universe.
3 (verse): This long poem in elegiac couplets presents the results of the ordering of the universe. Ether, the stars and sky, the earth, and the sea have become distinguished, and the nine orders of angels attend on the God who exists outside the universe. There follows a catalogue of the stars and constellations, along with the planets and their natures. Then the earth and its creatures are described, with catalogues of mountains, beasts, rivers, plants (which are treated in particular detail), fish, and birds.
4 (prose): The relationships between the powers operating in the universe are analyzed. All things under the heavens form part of a cosmic cycle, controlled by Natura, which will never cease, since its maker and cause are eternal. Hyle is the basis, whom the rational plan of God and Noys has ordered in an everlasting system, although subject to time: "For as Noys is forever pregnant of the divine will, she in turn informs Endelechia with the images she conceives of the eternal patterns, Endelechia impresses them upon Nature, and Nature imparts to Imarmene [Destiny; Greek εἰμαρμένη] what the well-being of the universe demands."

=== Microcosmus ===
1 (prose): Noys displays the created universe to Natura and points out its various features.
2 (verse): With the work of Noys, Silva has recovered her true beauty. Noys (still speaking to Natura) declares herself proud of the harmony she has brought to the universe.
3 (prose): Noys says that for the completion of the cosmic design, the creation of man is needed. For this it is necessary that Natura seek out Urania (the celestial principle) and Physis (the material principle). Natura sets forth and searches through various regions of the heavens. When she reaches the outermost limit of the heavens, she encounters the Genius whose responsibility it is to delineate the celestial forms on the individual objects of the universe. He greets Natura and points out Urania, whose brightness dazzles Natura.
4 (verse): Urania agrees to descend to Earth and collaborate in the creation of man. She will take with her the human soul, guiding it through all the heavens so that it may become acquainted with the laws of fate and learn the rules that govern its behavior.
5 (prose): To gain the sanction of the divine powers, Natura and Urania travel outside the cosmos, to the sanctuary of the supreme divinity, Tugaton (the Good; Greek τὸ ἀγαθόν), whose favor they pray for. They then descend, one by one, through the planetary spheres.
6 (verse): Having reached the lower boundary of the sphere of the Moon, where the quintessence meets the terrestrial elements, Natura pauses to look about her.
7 (prose): Natura and Urania see thousands of spirits. Urania tells Natura that, in addition to the angels who dwell beyond the created universe and in the heavenly spheres, there are spirits below the Moon—some good, some evil.
8 (verse): Urania bids Natura to review the totality of the universe and note the principles of divine concord that it manifests.
9 (prose): Natura and Urania descend to Earth and reach a secluded locus amoenus (called Gramision or Granusion—the readings of the manuscripts are disputed). There they meet Physis, accompanied by her daughters Theorica (Contemplative Knowledge) and Practica (Active Knowledge), who is rapt in contemplation of created life in all its aspects. Suddenly, Noys appears.
10 (verse): Noys explains that Natura, Urania, and Physis can collaborate to complete the creation by fashioning a creature who participates in both the divine and earthly realms.
11 (prose): Noys assigns Urania, Physis, and Natura specific tasks in the creation of man, providing a model for each. Urania, using the Mirror of Providence, is to provide him with a soul derived from Endelechia; Physis, using the Book of Memory, is to provide him with a body; and Natura, using the Table of Destiny, is to unite the soul and the body.
12 (verse): Natura summons her two companions to begin the work. Physis, however, is somewhat angry, since she sees that matter is ill-suited for the fashioning of a being that requires intellect. Urania assists her by eliminating the evil taint from Silva and containing the matter within definite limits.
13 (prose): Physis—making use of the imperfect aspects of Silva that had (somewhat uncertainly) submitted to the will of God and had been left over from the rest of creation—fashions a body. The four humors are described, along with the tripartite division of the body into the head (seat of the brain and the sensory organs), the breast (seat of the heart) and the loins (seat of the liver).
14 (verse): The powers of the senses and the brain, heart, and liver are detailed. The organs of generation will prevent human life from wholly passing away and the universe from returning to chaos.

== Platonic background ==
The ultimate source for much of Bernardus' allegory is the account of creation in Plato's Timaeus, as transmitted in the incomplete Latin translation, with lengthy commentary, by Calcidius. This was the only work of Plato's that was widely known in western Europe during the Middle Ages, and it was central to the renewed interest in natural science among the philosophers associated with the school of Chartres:

Chartres … would long remain the fertile soil in which this conception [of man as microcosm] would grow, and this the more as the Timaeus, itself constructed upon the parallelism between microcosm and macrocosm, became a central preoccupation of teaching at Chartres. This was the first age, the golden age, of Platonism as such in the West, an age which found in the Timaeus an entire physics, an anthropology, a metaphysics, and even a lofty spiritual teaching.

From the Timaeus Bernardus and the Chartrian thinkers, such as Thierry of Chartres and William of Conches, adopted three fundamental assumptions: "that the visible universe is a unified whole, a 'cosmos'; that it is the copy of an ideal exemplar; and that its creation was the expression of the goodness of its creator". Thierry had written a Tractatus de sex dierum operibus, in which he had essayed to elucidate the biblical account of creation iuxta physicas rationes tantum ("purely in terms of physical causes"); and this perhaps accounts for Bernardus' dedication of the Cosmographia to Thierry.

Along with the Timaeus and Calcidius' commentary, Bernardus' work also draws on Platonic themes diffused throughout a variety of works of late antiquity, such as Apuleius' philosophical treatises, Macrobius' commentary on Cicero's Dream of Scipio, the Hermetic Asclepius, the De nuptiis Philologiae et Mercurii of Martianus Capella, and Boethius' Consolation of Philosophy. In addition to their Platonic elements, the latter two works would have provided models of the prosimetrum form; and Macrobius' commentary had authorized the use of allegorical (fabulosa) methods in philosophers' treatment of certain subjects, since sciunt inimicam esse naturae apertam nudamque expositionem sui ("they realize that a frank, open exposition of herself is distasteful to Nature").

== Reception ==
That the Cosmographia survives, in whole or in part, in about fifty manuscripts indicates that it enjoyed a good deal of popularity in the Middle Ages. Scholars have traced its influence on "a wide variety of medieval and renaissance authors, including Hildegard of Bingen, Vincent of Beauvais, Dante, Chaucer, Nicholas of Cusa, and Boccaccio—whose annotated copy of the work we possess". In particular, Bernardus' conceptions of Natura and Genius would be echoed and transformed in the works of Alain de Lille, in the Roman de la Rose, in Chaucer's Parlement of Foules, and in Gower's Confessio Amantis.

Although there is no evidence that medieval readers considered the Cosmographia incompatible with orthodox Christianity, some modern scholars, from the 18th century into the 20th century, have found it to be radically un-Christian, variously viewing the work as at bottom either pantheistic or pagan. These views were challenged by Étienne Gilson in the 1920s, though he himself thought that the Cosmographia had dualistic features. The theological implications of the work continue to be a subject of debate.

== Editions and translations ==
=== Editions ===
- De mundi universitate libri duo sive megacosmus et microcosmus, ed. C. S. Barach and J. Wrobel (Innsbruck, 1876).
- Cosmographia, ed. André Vernet, in Bernardus Silvestris: Recherches sur l'auteur et l'oeuvre, suivies d'une édition critique de la 'Cosmographia' (unpublished dissertation, École nationale des chartes, 1938). This is the only critical edition of the Cosmographia produced to date.
- Cosmographia, ed. Peter Dronke (Leiden: Brill, 1978). ISBN 90-04-05767-6
- Cosmographia, in Bernardus Silvestris, Poetic Works, ed. and trans. Winthrop Wetherbee, Dumbarton Oaks Medieval Library 38 (Cambridge, Mass.: Harvard UP, 2015). ISBN 978-0-674-74378-6
- Cosmographia, ed. Marco Albertazzi (Lavis: La Finestra Editrice, 2020). ISBN 978-8895925-91-2

=== Translations ===
- German: Über die allumfassende Einheit der Welt: Makrokosmos und Mikrokosmos, trans. Wilhelm Rath (Stuttgart: Mellinger, [1953]).
- English: The Cosmographia of Bernardus Silvestris, trans. Winthrop Wetherbee (New York: Columbia UP, 1973). ISBN 0-231-09625-9. A revised version of this translation appears in Wetherbee's edition of Bernardus' Poetic Works, cited above under "Editions".
- French: Cosmographie, trans. Michel Lemoine (Paris: Cerf, 1998). ISBN 2-204-05725-8
- Dutch: De Kosmos geschreven, trans. Piet Gerbrandy (Eindhoven: Damon, 2021). ISBN 978-94-6340-310-8

== See also ==
- Renaissance of the 12th century
