= Old English Boethius =

English translation/adaptation of the sixth-century Consolation of Philosophy by Boethius

The Old English Boethius is an Old English translation/adaptation of the sixth-century Consolation of Philosophy by Boethius, dating from between c. 880 and 950. Boethius's work is prosimetrical, alternating between prose and verse, and one of the two surviving manuscripts of the Old English translation renders the poems as Old English alliterative verse: these verse translations are known as the Metres of Boethius.

The translation is attributed in one manuscript to King Alfred (r. 870–899), and this was long accepted, but the attribution is now considered doubtful.

== Manuscripts ==
The Old English Consolation texts are known from three medieval manuscripts/fragments and an early modern copy:

- Oxford, Bodleian Library, MS Bodley 180 (known as MS B). Produced at the end of the eleventh century or the beginning of the twelfth), translating the whole of the Consolation (prose and verse) into prose.
- London, British Library, Cotton MS Otho A.vi (known as MS C). Mid-tenth century. This contains a prose translation of Boethius's prose largely identical to MS B, but gives verse translations of the metres. The manuscript is imperfect due to damage in the Ashburnham House fire of 1731.
- The Napier Fragment (known as MS N), apparently from the first half of the tenth century. This was a fragment of a single leaf of the text, edited by Arthur Napier in 1886. The fragment was lost soon after, however, and has not since been found.
- Oxford, Bodleian Library, Junius 12 (known as MS J). Produced around 1658–59 by Franciscus Junius. Amongst other things, it contains a transcription of MS B, with marginal variants from the prose passages of MS C, along with a transcription of the verses of MS C. It is now a primary, albeit not altogether reliable, witness to parts of C that have been lost to damage.

The work was clearly more widely known, however. Early booklists from Exeter Cathedral and Christ Church Canterbury mention it, along with Æthelweard's Chronicle and William of Malmesbury. It influenced Ælfric, the Old English Distichs of Cato, and even Nicholas Trevet's commentary on the Consolatio of c. 1300.

Despite the dates of the surviving manuscripts, the verse translations of the metres are clearly based on the prose translations and so are later.

== Authorship ==
The version in Otho A.vi attributes the work to Alfred the Great in both its prose and verse prologues, and this was long accepted by scholars. To quote the prose,

King Alfred was the interpreter of this book, and turned it from book Latin into English, as it is now done. Now he set forth word by word, now sense from sense, as clearly and intelligently as he was able, in the various and manifold worldly cares that oft troubled him both in mind and in body. These cares are very hard for us to reckon, that in his days came upon the kingdoms to which he had succeeded, and yet when he had studied this book and turned it from Latin into English prose, he wrought it up once more into verse, as it is now done.

But the attribution is no longer considered reliable, and it is now usual simply to speak of the Old English Boethius, or at most to describe it as 'Alfredian', signalling that it was probably connected with Alfred's educational programme rather than being by Alfred. The translation is thought to have originated between about 890 and the mid-tenth century, possibly but not necessarily in a court context, and to be by an anonymous translator.

== First, prose translation ==
The Consolation of Philosophy was a sixth-century Latin work and is considered one of the most important works of philosophy from the Middle Ages. A translation associated with Alfred's reign would be consistent with his avowed aims to circulate translations of the Consolation and other philosophical and historical works for the education of his people. In another of his works, the preface to the Old English translation of Gregory the Great's Pastoral Care, Alfred decries the lack of people who could read Latin in his kingdom, even among the clergy. The translation of Boethius would not only bring this important work and philosophies to a larger readership, it would also promote the English language.

The translation is a fairly free adaptation of Boethius and some parts are greatly summarised from the original. There is an introduction putting the work into context and numerous notes and digressions throughout explaining allusions. Many of these additions come from glosses to contemporary Latin manuscripts of the Consolation, which were obviously used in the translation process. There is also a significant number of references to Christianity within the translation which are entirely absent in Boethius's work.

== Metrical adaptation of prose translation of Boethius's verse ==
Sometime after the composition of the prose translation, someone adapted the prose translations of Boethius's metres into Old English alliterative verse. They are an important example of relatively securely dateable Old English poetry.

== Editions and translations ==
- Assman, Bruno, ed. Die Handschrift von Exeter: Metra des Boethius, Salomo und Saturn, die Psalmen. 2 pt. (Bibliothek der angelsächsischen Poesie; 3.) Leipzig: (G. H. Wigand?), 1897–98
- Fox, Samuel, ed. and tr. King Alfred’s Anglo-Saxon Version of the Metres of Boethius, with an English translation and notes. London: W. Pickering, 1835
- Griffiths, Bill, ed. Alfred's Metres of Boethius. Pinner: Anglo-Saxon Books, 1991 ISBN 1-898281-03-3.
- Hostetter, Aaron K., tr. Meters of Boethius (Title in Dr Hostetter's Anglo-Saxon Narrative Poetry Project )
- Krämer, Ernst, tr. Die altenglischen Metra des Boetius. (Bonner Beiträge zur Anglistik; Heft 8.) Bonn: P. Hanstein, 1902
- Krapp, G. P., ed. The Paris Psalter and the Meters of Boethius. (Anglo-Saxon Poetic Records; vol. 5.) New York: Columbia U. P., 1932; pp. 153–203
- Irvine, Susan and Godden, Malcolm, ed. and trans. The Old English Boethius with Verse Prologues and Epilogues Associated with King Alfred. Cambridge: Harvard U. P., 2012. ISBN 9780674055582 [an edition and facing-page translation of the Old English Boethius, both prose and verse]
- Sedgefield, Walter John, ed. and trans., King Alfred’s Version of the Consolations of Boethius (Oxford: Clarendon Press, 1900) (PDF)
- Foys, Martin et al. (eds.): Old English versions of the Boethian Meters are being edited to digital images of their manuscript pages (including UV images) and Junius's transcriptions, and translated, in the Old English Poetry in Facsimile Project (University of Wisconsin-Madison, 2019-)

== See also ==
- Boece a later English translation of the Consolation of Philosophy by Geoffrey Chaucer
- The Late Scholar, a novel by Jill Paton Walsh, centres on a manuscript of the Consolation of Philosophy which may have been read and glossed by King Alfred.
