= Victorinus of Pettau =

3rd century Christian ecclesiastical writer

Saint Victorinus of Pettau
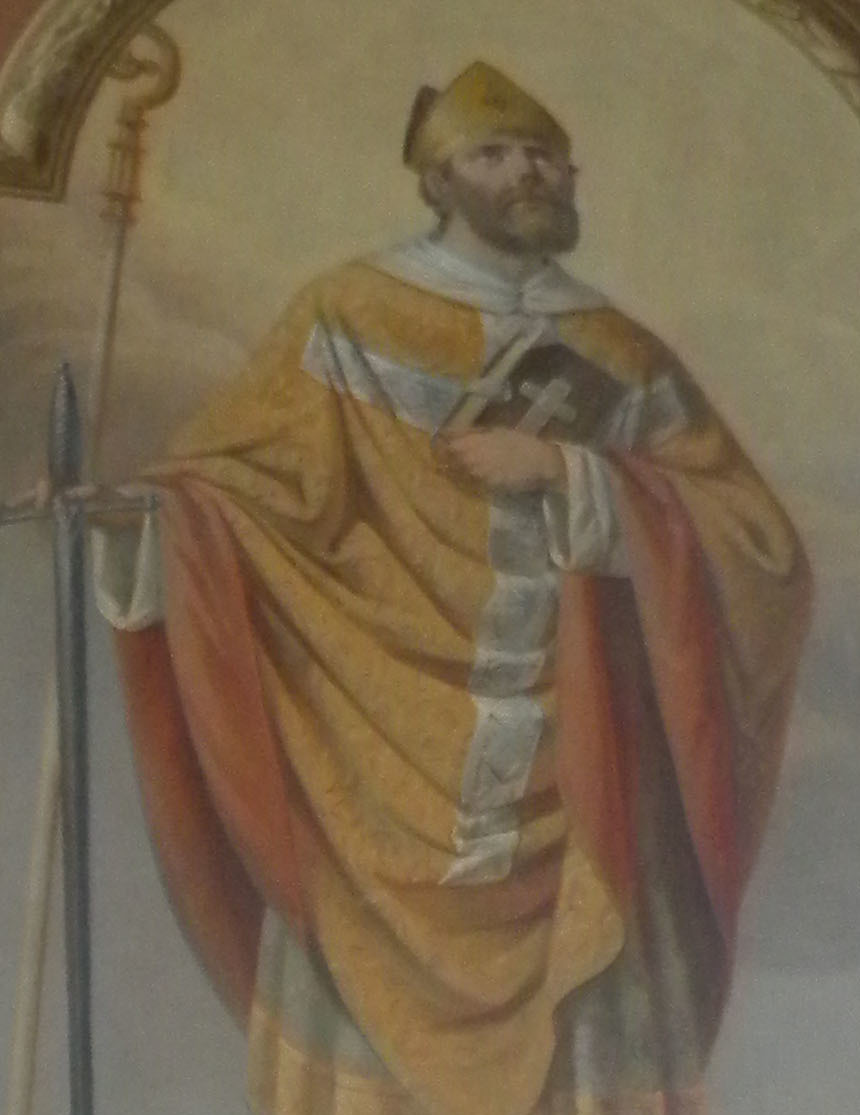
- Victorinus on a fresco in the parish church of Nova Cerkev (Slovenia)

Bishop of Poetovio and Martyr
- Born: Likely in Roman Greece
- Died: 303 or 304 AD; Ptuj (Pettau or Poetovio)
- Venerated in: Catholic Church; Eastern Orthodox Church
- Feast: 2 November
- Attributes: Palm, pontifical vestments

Saint Victorinus of Pettau (also Ptuj or Poetovio; Greek: Βικτωρίνος Πεταβίου; died 303 or 304) was an Early Christian ecclesiastical writer who flourished about 270, and who was martyred during the persecutions of Emperor Diocletian. A Bishop of Poetovio (modern Ptuj in Slovenia; German: Pettau) in Pannonia, Victorinus is also known as Victorinus Petavionensis or Poetovionensis. Victorinus composed commentaries on various texts within the Christians' Holy Scriptures.

== Life ==
Born probably in Roman Greece on the confines of the Eastern and Western Empires or in Poetovio with rather mixed population, due to its military character, Victorinus spoke Greek better than Latin, which explains why, in St. Jerome's opinion, his works written in the latter tongue were more remarkable for their matter than for their style. Bishop of the City of Pettau, he was the first theologian to use Latin for his exegesis.

His works are mainly exegetical. Victorinus composed commentaries on various works of the Bible, including Genesis, Exodus, Leviticus, Isaiah, Ezekiel, Habakkuk, Ecclesiastes, the Song of Songs, Matthew, and the Apocalypse of John (Revelation). He also composed theological treatises against varieties of Christianity he considered heretical. The only works of his that survived past antiquity, however, are his Commentary on the Apocalypse and the short tract On the construction of the world (De fabrica mundi).

Victorinus was much influenced by Origen. Jerome gives him an honorable place in his catalogue of ecclesiastical writers. Jerome occasionally cites the opinion of Victorinus (on Ecclesiastes 4:13, Ezekiel 26, and elsewhere), but considered him to have been affected by the opinions of the Chiliasts or Millenarians. According to Jerome, Victorinus died a martyr in 304.

By contrast to Jerome's positive reception in the late fourth and early fifth century, Victorinus's works were condemned and listed as forbidden an according to the Gelasian Decree, a 6th-century work attributed to the 5th century Pope Gelasius I; it includes a list of works compiled by heretics or used by schismatics to be rejected and avoided, and lists Victorinus's work there.

Victorinus is commemorated in both the Latin Catholic Church and the Eastern Orthodox Church on 2 November. Until the 17th century he was sometimes confused with the Latin rhetorician, Victorinus Afer.

== Commentary on the Apocalypse ==
Victorinus wrote a commentary on the Book of Revelation that was later republished in a redacted form by Jerome in the 5th century AD. An original, unredacted manuscript was found in 1918. The commentary was composed not long after the Valerian Persecution, about 260. According to Claudio Moreschini, "The interpretation is primarily allegorical, with a marked interest in arithmology." Johannes Quasten writes that "It seems that he did not give a running commentary on the entire text but contented himself with a paraphrase of selected passages." Victorinus interpreted Revelation 20:4-6 quite literally in a millennialist (chiliastic) fashion: as a prophecy of a forthcoming rule of the just in an Earthly paradise.

The book is interesting to modern scholars as an example of how people in antiquity interpreted the book of Revelation. Victorinus sees the four animals singing praise to God as the Gospels, and the 24 elders seated on thrones in Revelation 4 are the 12 patriarchs of the 12 tribes of Israel and the 12 apostles. He also agrees with views that the Whore of Babylon "drunk with the blood of martyrs and saints" represents the City of Rome and its persecutions of Christians, and that The Beast described in chapter 13 represents Emperor Nero. As Nero was already dead during Victorinus's time, he believed that the later passages referred to Nero Redivivus, a monstrous revived Nero who would attack from the East. Victorinus sees the sharp two-edged sword that Christ wields with his mouth in Revelation 1 as the biblical canon, with one edge being the Old Testament and another the New Testament. He also believed that the "two witnesses" in Revelation were the prophets Elijah and another that he suspects is Jeremiah because "his death was never discovered." For Victorinus, the two witnesses (and Christ) are the only inhabitants of Paradise in the present age, as all (even Christian martyrs) are currently in Hades. However, the two witnesses will descend to Earth in the age described in Revelation to finally meet their deaths.

== Works ==
- On the Creation of the World
- Commentary on the Apocalypse

== See also ==
- Saint Victorinus of Pettau, patron saint archive
