= Ambrosiaster =

Exegete of St. Paul's epistles

Pseudo-Ambrose
- Occupations: Clergyman, writer
- Writing career
- Language: Latin
- Genre: Bible
- Subject: Christianity
- Notable work: Commentary on the Pauline epistles

Ambrosiaster or Pseudo-Ambrose is the name given to the unknown author of a commentary on the epistles of Saint Paul, written some time between 366 and 384 AD. The name "Ambrosiaster" in Latin means "would-be Ambrose". Various conjectures have been made as to Ambrosiaster's true identity, and several other works have been attributed to the same author, with varying degrees of certainty.

== Identity ==
Pseudo-Ambrose was the name given by Erasmus to refer to the author of a volume containing the first complete Latin commentary on the Pauline epistles.

Attempts to identify Ambrosiaster with known authors have continued, but with no success. Because Augustine cites Ambrosiaster's commentary on Romans 5:12 under the name of "Hilary", many critics have attempted to identify Ambroasiaster with one of the many writers named "Hilary" active in the period. In 1899, Germain Morin suggested that the writer was Isaac, a converted Jew and writer of a tract on the Trinity and Incarnation, who was exiled to Spain in 378–380 and then relapsed to Judaism. Morin afterwards abandoned this theory of the authorship in favour of Decimus Hilarianus Hilarius, proconsul of Africa in 377. Alternatively, Paolo Angelo Ballerini attempted to sustain the traditional attribution of the work to Ambrose, in his complete edition of that Father's work. This is extremely problematic, though, since it would require Ambrose to have written the book before he became a bishop, and then added to it in later years, incorporating later remarks of Hilary of Poitiers on Romans. No identifications, therefore, have acquired lasting popularity with scholars, and Ambrosiaster's identity remains a mystery.

Internal evidence from the documents has been taken to suggest that the author was active in Rome during the period of Pope Damasus, and, almost certainly, a member of the clergy.

== Works ==
=== Commentary on Paul ===
The Commentary on Thirteen Pauline Letters is considered valuable as evidence of the state of the Latin text of Paul's epistles before the appearance of the Vulgate of Jerome, and as an example of Pauline interpretation prior to Augustine of Hippo. It was traditionally ascribed to Ambrose, but in 1527, Erasmus threw doubt on the accuracy of this ascription, and the anonymous author came to be known as "Ambrosiaster". It was once thought that Erasmus coined this name; however, René Hoven, in 1969, showed that this was incorrect, and that credit should actually be given to the Maurists. Later scholars have followed Hoven in this assessment, although it has also been suggested that the name originated with Franciscus Lucas Brugensis.

=== Other works ===
Several other works which now survive only as fragments have been attributed to this same author. These include a commentary on Matthew 24, and discussions on the parable of the leaven, the denial of Peter, and Jesus's arrest. In 1905, Alexander Souter established that Ambrosiaster was also the author of the Quaestiones Veteris et Novi Testamenti, a lengthy collection of exegetical and polemical tractates which manuscripts have traditionally ascribed to Augustine.

Other works ascribed to the same author, less definitely, are the Lex Dei sive Mosaicarum et Romanorum legum collatio, De bello judaico, and the fragmentary Contra Arianos sometimes ascribed to the pseudo-Hilary and the sermo 246 of pseudo-Augustine. They mention Simon Magus.

== Influence ==
Many scholars argue that Ambrosiaster's works were essentially Pelagian, although this is disputed. Pelagius cited him extensively. For example, Alfred Smith argued that Pelagius got his views on predestination and original sin from Ambrosiaster. However, Augustine also made use of Ambrosiaster's commentaries.

== Bibliography ==
- Bussières, Marie-Pierre (2010). "L'Esprit de Dieu et l'Esprit Saint dans les Questions sur l'Ancien et le Nouveau Testament de l'Ambrosiaster". Revue d'Études Augustiniennes et Patristiques. 56: 25–44. doi:10.1484/J.REA.5.101054.
- Bussieres, Marie-Pierre (2002). "Les quaestiones 114 et 115 de l'Ambrosiaster ont-elles été influencées par l'apologétique de Tertullien ?". Revue d'Études Augustiniennes et Patristiques. 48: 101–130. doi:10.1484/J.REA.5.104848.
- Bussières, Marie-Pierre (2006). "L'Influence du synode tenu à Rome en 382 sur I'exégèse de I'Ambrosiaser". Sacris Erudiri. 45: 107–124. doi:10.1484/J.SE.2.302460.
- Bussières, Marie-Pierre. Ambrosiaster. Contre les Païens. Sur le destin. Texte, traduction et commentaire. Paris, Éditions du Cerfs (Sources chrétiennes 512), 2007.
- Cain, Andrew (2005). "In ambrosiaster's shadow : A critical Re-evaluation of the last surviving letter exchange between pope damasus and jerome". Revue d'Études Augustiniennes et Patristiques. 51 (2): 257–277. doi:10.1484/J.REA.5.104912.
- Cooper, Stephen A.; Hunter, David G. (2010). "Ambrosiaster redactor sui: The Commentaries on the Pauline Epistles (Excluding Romans)". Revue d'Études Augustiniennes et Patristiques. 56: 69–91. doi:10.1484/J.REA.5.101056.
- De Bruyn, Theodore (2011). "Ambrosiaster's Interpretations of Romans 1:26-27". Vigiliae Christianae. 65 (5): 463–483. doi:10.1163/157007211X561635. hdl:10393/44177.
- De Bruyn, Theodore S. (2010). "Ambrosiaster's Revisions of His Commentary on Romans and Roman Synodal Statements about the Holy Spirit". Revue d'Études Augustiniennes et Patristiques. 56: 45–68. doi:10.1484/J.REA.5.101055. hdl:10393/44249.
- Hoven, René (1969). "Notes sur Érasme et les auteurs anciens". L'Antiquité Classique. 38: 169–174. doi:10.3406/antiq.1969.1547.
- David g. Hunter (2009). "2008 NAPS Presidential Address: The Significance of Ambrosiaster". Journal of Early Christian Studies. 17: 1–26. doi:10.1353/earl.0.0244. S2CID 170919473.
- Lunn-Rockliffe, Sophie (2007). Ambrosiaster's Political Theology. doi:10.1093/acprof:oso/9780199230204.001.0001. ISBN 9780199230204.
- Moreschini, Claudio, and Enrico Norelli. 2005 "Ambrosiaster," in Early Christian Greek and Latin Literature: A Literary History. Peabody, Mass: Hendrickson Publishers. vol. 2, p. 296-98.
- Mundle, Wilhelm. 1919. Die Exegese der paulinischen Briefe im Kommentar des Ambrosiaster.
- Papsdorf, Joshua (2012). ""Ambrosiaster" in Paul in the Middle Ages". In Cartwright, Steven (ed.). A Companion to St. Paul in the Middle Ages. Leiden: Brill. ISBN 978-90-04-23671-4.
- Queis, Dietrich Traugott von, and Augustine. 1972. Ambrosiaster: Quaestiones Veteris et Novi Testamenti. Quaestio 115: De fato. Basel.
- Souter, Alexander. 1905. A study of Ambrosiaster. Cambridge [Eng.]: The University Press.
- Souter, Alexander. 1927. The earliest Latin commentaries on the Epistles of St. Paul; a study. Oxford: Clarendon Press.
