= Don Zara del Fogo =

1656 book by Samuel Holland

Don Zara del Fogo: a mock-romance is a 1656 book in prose and verse by the English author Samuel Holland. The book is a pastiche of Spanish chivalric romances, such as Don Quixote. The main character Don Zara del Fogo considers himself a descendant of Lancelot of the Lake and "Thistram" (Tristan), and desires similar fame for facing eminent dangers. Zara is illiterate, but his squire Soto is tasked with reading to his master inspiring tales about Saint George and the Dragon, Sir Topaz and the elf-queen, and boar hunting for the supposedly famed Boar of Boston. Having the habit of sleeping naked, Zara emerges from his bed to seize his sword and to pose as the legitimate heir to the god Mars.

This English mock-heroic epic introduced the term "Orc" (spelt "Orke") to describe ogre-like monsters. The Oxford English Dictionary quotes a passage of the work where a multi-headed Orke is decapitated by an opponent. In the passage, the Orke is described as the offspring of an unnamed Incubus.

== Publication history ==
Don Zara del Fogo was written by Samuel Holland and printed by "T.W." for Thomas Vere in London in 1656. It was subtitled "a mock-romance / written originally in the British tongue, and made English by a person of much honor, Basilius Musophilus; with a marginall comment, expounding the hard things of the history". It is dedicated "to the most Nobly accomplished, ROBERT, THOMAS, and JOHN SPENCER, Esquires".

It was reprinted in 1656 under the title Wit and fancy in a maze. The book was then published in 1660 under the title of Romancio-Mastrix.

Another edition was published in 1719; it was titled The Spaniard: Or, Don Zara del Fogo: Translated From the Original Spanish by Basilius Musophilus.

== Pastiche of Spanish chivalric romances ==
The text, a pastiche of Spanish chivalric romances such as Don Quixote, is in three "books", each of six chapters, containing a combination of prose and verse. Chapter 3 of the third book consists of "Venus and Adonis: A Masque", with its own epilogue.

Chapter 1 begins with this sentence:

Don Zara his descent. The description of his Shield, and Martiall Furniture. His invocation, and setting forth to seek Adventures.

IT was now about that mungrell hour when the black-brow'd night, and grey-ey'd morning strove for superiority, when the mirror of Martiall spirits Don Zara del Fogo sweeping the somniferous God from o••is ample front with that Broom of Heaven his face-pounding fist, entred into serious contemplation of the renowned Acts of his most Noble Ancestors, Thistram the terrible and the great Lancelot of the Lake, so ravishing were those heroick, Rhapsodies, that (upon mature chew of the cud) the Champion began to tax himself of tardity, as not having accumulated that Fame, which at the price of so * eminent dangers he had so hotly hunted after; this second cogitation had but a while combated with the first, when he summons the Squire of his body Soto, who lay soundly sleeping at his beds feet, commanding him (since himself never knew Letters) to read the Chronicle History of Saint George, who bathed his body in the bloody bowels of a fell Dragon, or the like Atchievement of Sir Elamore, or the hard Quest of Sir Topaz after the Queen of Elues to Barwick, or of Sir Guy and the fierce Boar of Boston; Sir quoth Soto (who had hardly gained sight enough to see his Master) you were wont to take great pleasure in hearing the redoubted Adventures of Sir Bevis, sirnamed Southampton; and The Knight of the Sun; that, that quoth the Champion, the Knight of the Suns actions would put fire into a flint stone, animate a Log, and make a woodden leg to walk; Soto had not long led his Master by the large eares (* for our Champion boasted a long-linckt Genealogie, from the Phrygian King Midas, a hundred fourscore and fourteen descents by the fathers side) but suddenly deserting his bed, he ceazed (* all naked as he was) on his naked Sword, that Thunder-crack of terrour Slay-a-Cow, the very same that he lately won on Monta-Mole-hill from the great Gyant Phrenedecrenobroso, the son of Pediculo, and leaning thereon like the legitimate Heyr of Mars, he very attentively hoorded up the treasures of true Magnanimity.

== Orcs ==
Don Zara is an early source for the use of the term "Orc" (spelt "Orke") for an ogre-like monster in English.

== Sources ==
- Holland, Samuel, gentleman (1656). Don Zara del Fogo: a mock-romance. London: Thomas Vere.
- Holland, Samuel (2018) [1719 (London : printed for W. Chetwood; and R. Francklin; and sold by J. Roberts)]. The Spaniard: or, Don Zara del Fogo: Translated From the Original Spanish by Basilius Musophilus. With Notes. Gale ECCO, Print editions. ISBN 978-1-379-89281-6. OCLC 1035458182. – "these high-quality digital scans of original works are available via print-on-demand"
