= Renaut de Louhans =

Renaut de Louhans O.P.
- Occupation: Dominican friar
- Writing career
- Language: Old French
- Years active: 1330s
- Period: Late Middle Ages
- Genre: Dialogues
- Notable works: Roman de Fortune et de Felicité, Le Livre de Melibee et de Prudence

Reynaud or Renaut de Louhans or Louens was a Dominican translator from Poligny, in the Kingdom of France, active in the 1330s.

Louhans produced Old French translations of Boethius' De consolatione philosophiae , as Roman de Fortune et de Felicité, and of Albertanus of Brescia's Liber consolationis et consilii, as Le Livre de Melibee et de Prudence.

His Livre de Melibee et de Prudence, was copied into The Book of the Knight of the Tower and inspired Geoffrey Chaucer's "The Tale of Melibee".
