= Andrea da Grosseto =

Italian writer of the 13th century

Andrea da Grosseto was an Italian writer during the 13th century.

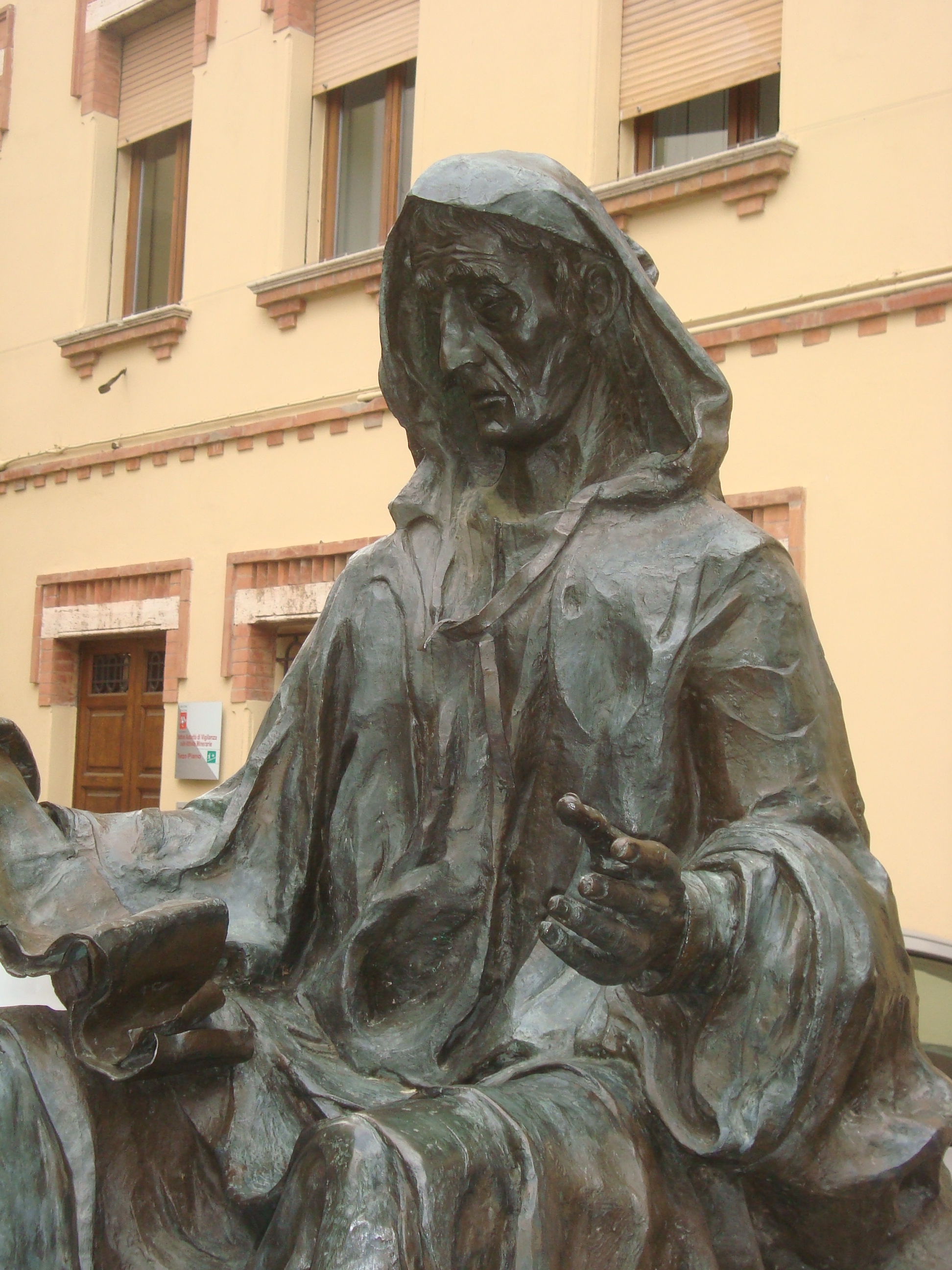
Monument (detail) of Andrea da Grosseto, Piazza Baccarini in Grosseto, Italy

== Biography ==
Born in Grosseto in the first half of 1200s; not much is known of his literary work and his life. Andrea moved to Paris, where he taught literature and the art of poetry. In 1268 he translated the Moral Treatises of Albertanus of Brescia from Latin into the vernacular. His contribution to Italian literature is significant, as he is considered by some to be the first writer in the Italian language.

Francesco Selmi, a scholar who almost by chance discovered the first manuscripts of this writer, while examining the codes of the Magliabechiana Library of Florence for a study regarding Dante Alighieri, realized the importance of the discovery and he worried about making it known to the public and other prominent literary scholars and critics. Selmi himself searched to find something more about his life and his career, but to no end.

=== Controversy ===
In the course of the 1900s Andrea da Grosseto's figure was studied by many researchers; some of them mistook the writer for a monk named Beato Andrea who had died in the 15th century in the Convento della Nave in Montorsaio. An incorrect transliteration of the word Beato into Bento led to the writer's identification with a supposed shoe-maker Andrea Bento belonging to the Order of Friars Minor. According to Laura Luzzetti Amerini, the actual Andrea da Grosseto was probably a layman and relative of a certain Giovanna di Bartolo, as is found in a 14th-century deed from the Archive of Grosseto.

== Vulgarisation ==
Francesco Selmi, with the support of Francesco Zambrini, president of the Commissione per i Testi di Lingua, and of professor Emilio Calvi of the Magliabechiana Library, began a survey on the codes of vulgarisation, for a correct transposition to be able to publish and let everyone read. As some codes of the Grossetan vulgarizer were damaged, he used the translation done by Soffredi del Grazia in 1278, and the original Latin texts by Albertanus, kept in Turin, which could be consulted by Selmi under the supervision of Professor Gorresio, Prefect of the Library, with the permission of the Ministry of Public Education. After an accurate job the scholar managed to transcribe all three of the Treatises, including the incomplete text, and to publish them.

The importance of the discovery was immediately recognised, mainly for three particular reasons which, as Selmi specified, make the heirloom of Andrea da Grosseto the most remarkable document in literary prose in the Italian language:

- The first reason is that the text has the certain date of 1268, with the name of the author and the place of vulgarisation being Paris.
- The second reason is that the text is written in the Italian language, without too many redundancies and constructions, words and typical ways of speech of the vernacular and the dialect.
- The third reason is the absolute testimony that the writer intended to not utilise his own Grossetan dialect, but to use a general "Italian national language". In fact he twice refers to the vernacular which he uses, defining it as italico (Italic).

And so Andrea da Grosseto was the first to intend to use vernacular as a national unifying language from the North to the South of the entire Peninsula.

Another hypothesis which Selmi proposed is that Dante Alighieri had known and read the work of the Grossetan writer and that he had been inspired by him for the drafting of his own work in the national dialect, understandable to all the inhabitants of the entire peninsula. The hypothesis is justified by the fact that, in all the ancient codes of Dante's Comedy that are known, there is a change of the letter n for the letter r within the verbs (for example, possoro instead of possono, correct Italian word for they can), an orthographic form which had never been seen before in codes dating previously to Dante's time, except that one in the works of Andrea da Grosseto. And so there is the possibility that the Grossetan author, following a desinence of his own dialect, introduced this orthographic form in the written work and that Dante had made use of this form. But although some scholars are in agreement with this hypothesis, the matter has not been addressed since and still remains to be cleared with certainty.

== Works ==
In 1268 Andrea da Grosseto translated the Moral Treatises of Albertanus of Brescia from Latin into the Italian vernacular.

The translated Treatises are:

- Della consolazione e dei consigli, vulgarisation of the Liber Consolationis et Consilii.
- Dottrina del tacere e del parlare, vulgarisation of the Liber Doctrina Dicendi et Tacendi.
- Dell'amore e della dilezione di Dio e del prossimo e delle altre cose (incomplete), vulgarisation of the Liber de Amore et Dilectione Dei et Proximi et Aliarum Rerum et de Forma Vitae.

== Legacy ==
A statue of Andrea da Grosseto by artist Arnaldo Mazzanti is located in the city center of Grosseto, in Piazza Baccarini. Below the statue is written, Andrea da Grosseto, primo scrittore in lingua italiana. Dottore a Parigi, 1268 (English: Andrea of Grosseto, first writer in the Italian language. Doctor in Paris, 1268).

== See also ==
- Albertano of Brescia
- Italian literature

== Bibliography ==
- Volgarizzamento del Liber de doctrina loquendi et tacendi di Albertano da Brescia, Andrea da Grosseto, Rome, Biblioteca Italiana, 2005.
- Dei Trattati morali di Albertano da Brescia, volgarizzamento inedito del 1268, Francesco Selmi, Commissione per i testi di lingua, Bologna, Romagnoli, 1873, pp. 58–362.
- Volgarizzamenti del '200 e '300, Cesare Segre, Turin, Utet, 1953, pp. 139–56.
- La prosa del Duecento, Cesare Segre and Mario Marti, Milan-Naples, Ricciardi, 1959.
