= Hans Vintler =

Tyrolean poet (died 1419)

Hans Vintler (died 1419) was a late medieval Tyrolean poet, author of Die Pluemen der Tugent ("The Flowers of Virtue", ed. Zingerle 1874), a didactic poem of 10,172 lines. He was a member of local nobility, from a family originating in Vintl in the Puster Valley. He is first recorded in 1407 as joining the Tyrolean defensive pact against Appenzell known as the "Hawks" (Falkenbund). In 1415 he was honored by Sigismund of Luxembourg, who granted him the right to bear a crown on his helmet.

Vintler cannot be considered one of the great poets of his time, but he was reasonably well-read, and had knowledge of both Latin and Italian besides his native German. His main source was the Italian Fiore di virtù by Tommaso Gozzadini (c. 1320), besides the Ammaestramenti de’ Filosofi, which were combined with that work in some manuscripts.
