= Clarembald of Arras =

Clarembald (Clarembaud) of Arras (c. 1110 – c. 1187) was a French theologian. He is best known for his Tractatus super librum Boetii De Trinitate, a commentary on the Opuscula Sacra of Boethius. He belonged to the School of Chartres, of William of Conches and Bernard Silvestris. He was a follower of Thierry of Chartres and Hugh of St. Victor, and an opponent of Gilbert of Poitiers.

== Biography ==
Clarembald was educated by Thierry of Chartres, whom Clarembald describes as the most learned man in Europe, and by Hugh of St. Victor, whom Clarembald also cites as one of his masters. He was the provost in the city of Arras in 1152. He may have been a schoolmaster in Arras before his appointment as provost.

In 1156 Clarembald was made Archdeacon of Arras under Bishop Godescalc, a position he retained through the episcopacy of Godescalc's successor, Andrew of Paris. When Frombald, another Archdeacon of Arras, was named bishop in 1174, Clarembald appears to have either retired or left the city, for his name no longer appears in the church records from that date on. It is possible that Clarembald went to Laon, where the name ‘Clarembald’ appears in the church records along with ‘Simon’ as chaplains of the church of Sts Nicolas and James under the reigns of Walter of Mortagne (1152–74) and Roger de Rozoy (1174–1201).

In his letter to Abbot Odo which precedes his commentary on Boethius’ De Trinitate in ms. Saint-Omer 142, Clarembald mentions that he served for a time as schoolmaster in Laon. This might have taken place around 1157–9 for the schoolmaster, Angotus, is not mentioned in records of Laon around that time. But exactly when Clarembald might have been schoolmaster in Laon is a matter of conjecture.

There is one other interesting historical record of Clarembald. In his biography of Thomas Becket, the monk William of Canterbury mentioned that Clarembald of Arras gave some relics of Becket to a convent in Bapaume, a town about fifteen miles from Arras. It is possible that Clarembald and Becket knew each other as they were students in Paris at the same time and Becket stayed in Arras during part of his exile in 1164, when Clarembald was archdeacon there.

== Works ==
Clarembald's. extant writings consist of three works: a commentary on Boethius’ De Trinitate, a commentary on Boethius’ De hebdomadibus, and an unfinished Tractatulus on the hexameron, in the course of which Clarembald comments briefly Boethius’ Contra Eutychen et Nestorium.
