= Fiore di virtù =

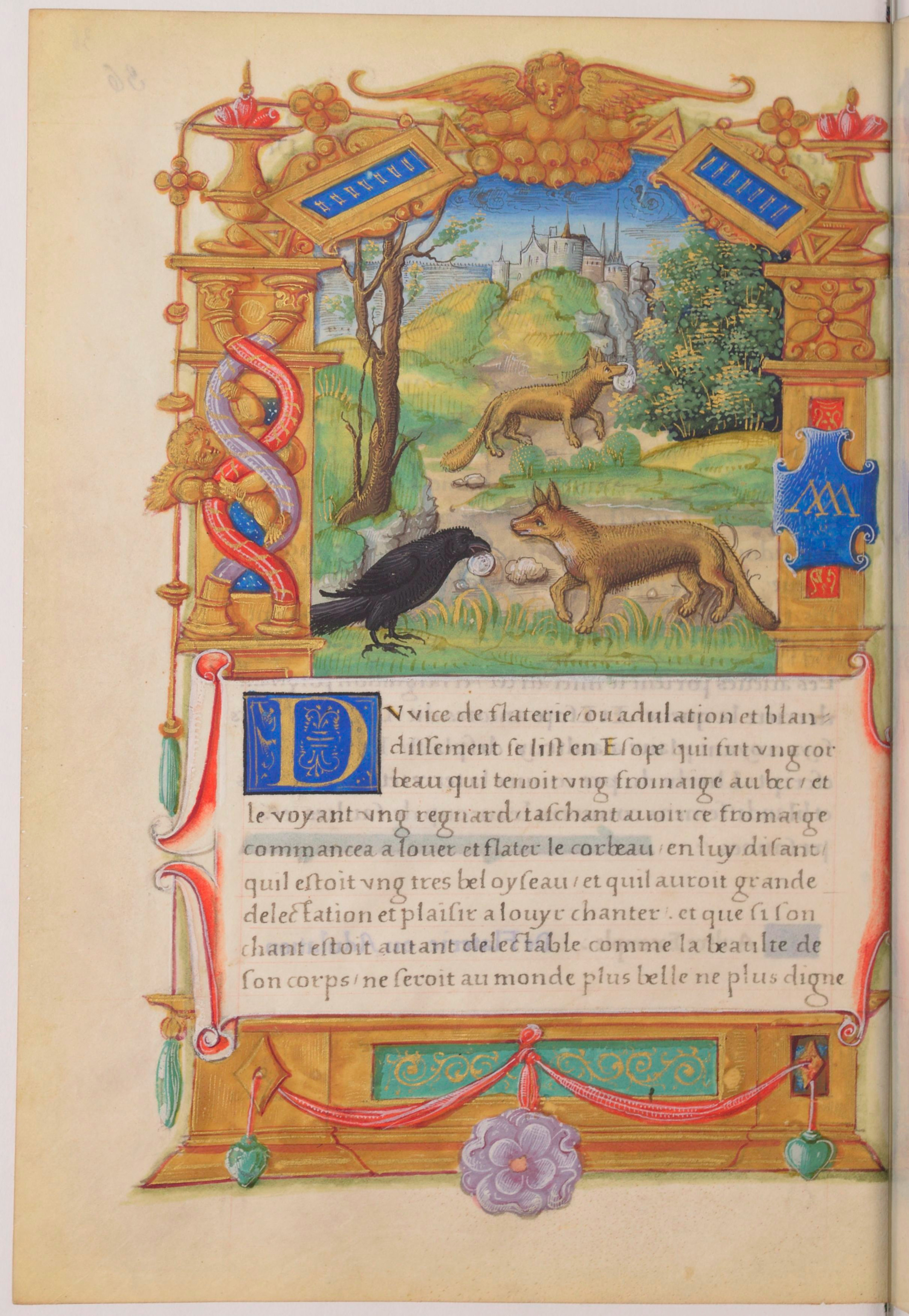
First page of the chapter on flattery, symbolized by the crow and the fox. From a manuscript of the French translation, Fleur de vertu, now BNF, Fr.1877, decorated by the Master of François de Rohan.

The Fiore di virtù ('flower of virtue') is an anonymous Italian prose treatise on morality from the first half of the 14th century. It was a popular and widely translated work into the 16th century.

== Date and authorship ==
The Fiore was originally written in the Bolognese dialect, but later Tuscanized. It was originally written between 1313 and 1323, since it does not refer to Thomas Aquinas, who was canonized in 1323, as a saint. It may have been completed only later.

Two manuscripts attribute the Fiore to a "Brother Thomas", one of them giving his surname as Gozzadini and his order as the Benedictines. He has been identified with the Bolognese notary Tommaso Gozzadini, although he is not otherwise known to have been a monk. He does not appear in any document after 1329, when he may have retired to a monastery to finish his work, if he is indeed the author. Some manuscript of the Fiore include the Dicerie of Pietro Boattieri, another Bolognese notary and a contemporary of Gozzadini.

An expanded Italian version with six added chapters on love was printed at Florence in 1491.

== Structure and content ==
It is divided into 35 chapters on virtues and vices. Each chapter offers a definition, an example drawn from the animal world of the bestiaries, a set of maxims and an exemplum. The model for the format of the Fiore was the Summa theologiae of Aquinas. The main source for the animal examples is Bartholomaeus Anglicus's De proprietatibus rerum. The maxims were taken from Aristotle, the Bible, Seneca, William Perault, Giles of Rome, Albertanus of Brescia and the Liber philosophorum moralium antiquorum. The author cites two contemporary vernacular works: Guido Guinizzelli's Al cor gentil and Dante Alighieri's Convivio.

== Translations, editions and influence ==
In the 15th and 16th centuries, the Fiore was translated into Castilian, Catalan, French, English, Romanian, German, Persian, Armenian, Greek, Croatian, Russian and Serbian. There are at least 95 manuscripts of the Italian version and 57 printed editions from before 1501, including 35 from before 1489, when the first Catalan printing appeared. The Fiore was "probably the most popular of all books printed in Italian during the fifteenth century." Two French editions appeared in the 15th century.

The Castilian translation (Flor de virtudes) was in existence by 1470, when it was copied into the Cancionero de Juan Fernández de Íxar. The first Castilian edition, replete with Aragonesisms, was published in Zaragoza by Pablo and Juan Hurus in 1490. Five Catalan editions had appeared by 1502 and thirteen Castilian editions by the end of the 16th century. In 1583, the Spanish Inquisition added the Fiore to its list of prohibited books because it was anonymous.

There are three Croatian recensions of the Fiore (or Cvijet kreposti) in each of the three scripts associated with the language: Glagolitic, Cyrillic and Latin. There are five manuscripts of the Glagolitic version in the Chakavian dialect. The earliest Cyrillic copy, copied at Dubrovnik in 1520, is in the Shtokavian dialect. It contains the additional chapters from the expanded Italian version.

A German translation and versification, Blumen der Tugend, was produced by Hans Vintler in 1411 while he was Hauptmann of Stein castle in Ritten. It contains 10,172 verses. Towards the end of the work, Vintler began incorporating original material from ancient, patristic and philosophical sources. Max Siller argues that Vintler began his work in response to a feud between his family and Frederick IV, Duke of Austria, from 1407 to 1409.

The Fiore served as a source for the bestiaries of Franco Sacchetti and Leonardo da Vinci and for the Acerba of Cecco d'Ascoli. The Ristorato of Ristoro Canigiani is a versification of the Fiore.

== Bibliography ==
- Amann, Klaus; Siller, Max (2009). "Urban Literary Entertainment in the Middle Ages and the Early Modern Age: The Example of Tyrol". In Albrecht Classen (ed.). Urban Space in the Middle Ages and the Early Modern Age. De Gruyter. pp. 505–535.
- Bühler, Curt F. (1947). "The Fleurs de toutes vertus and Christine de Pisan's L'epître d'Othéa". Publications of the Modern Language Association of America. 62 (1): 32–44. doi:10.1632/459190.
- Bühler, Curt F. (1949). "The Fleurs de toutes vertus". Publications of the Modern Language Association of America. 64 (3): 600–601. JSTOR 459760.
- Bühler, Curt F. (1955). "Studies in the Early Editions of the Fiore di virtù". The Papers of the Bibliographical Society of America. 49 (4): 315–339. JSTOR 24299613.
- Mateo Palacios, Ana, ed. (2013). Flor de virtudes. Prensas de la Universidad de Zaragoza.
- Milan, Gabriella (2002). "Gozzadini, Tommaso". Dizionario Biografico degli Italiani (in Italian). Vol. 58: Gonzales–Graziani. Rome: Istituto dell'Enciclopedia Italiana. ISBN 978-88-12-00032-6.
- Picone, Michelangelo (2002). "Fiore di virtù". In Peter Hainsworth; David Robey (eds.). The Oxford Companion to Italian Literature. Oxford University Press.
- Rosenwald, Lessing J., ed. (1953). The Florentine Fior di virtu of 1491. Translated by Nicholas Fersin. E. Stern.
- Šimić, Marinka; Zaradija Kiš, Antonija (2021). "Cvijet kreposti u Libru od mnozijeh razloga: leksičke i animalističke osobitosti". Croatica. 45 (65): 149–181.
- Wegener, Dennis (2019). "Review of Max Siller (ed.), Hans Vintler: Die Blumen der Tugend (1411) (Innsbruck: Universitätsverlag Wagner, 2015)". Austrian History Yearbook. 50: 204–205. doi:10.1017/S0067237819000195.
