= Pantheon (book) =

Published work by Gottfried von Viterbo

The Liber universalis ('universal book') is a work of Gottfried von Viterbo (c. 1120 – c. 1196). In this study which is completed in 1185, he chronicles world history from the creation of the world to the time of Heinrich VI (Henry VI). The liber was written around 1185 and is an extended version of the previous Memoria seculorum ('remembrance of the ages') by the same author which again builds on the Speculum regum ('mirror for kings/princes') dated to around 1185. It is subdivided into 20 particulae ('(small) parts'), the last of which is the so-called Gesta Friderici' ('Frederic's achievements') first dedicated to Heinrich VI but ultimately to Pope Gregory VIII. The famous prosimetrum Pantheon builds upon the liber universalis and exists in 3 editions (1187,1188,1191). The Pantheon manuscript enjoyed a wide distribution in the Late Middle Ages.

== Literature ==
- "Gotifredi Viterbiensis Opera". Monumenta Germaniae Historica (in Latin). 1872.
