= Albertanus of Brescia =

13th-century Italian philosopher

Start of Albertanus' moral treatises in Italian translation by Andrea of Grosseto

Albertanus of Brescia (Italian: Albertano da Brescia, c. 1195 – c. 1251) was an author of Latin social treatises and sermons.

== Life ==
Albertanus was from Brescia, in northern Italy, but little is known of his early life. He had three sons, Vincent, Stephen, and John (who was a surgeon). He was a notary and causidici (professional legal counselor).

He first appears in the historical record in 1226 as a judge renewing the Lombard League. In 1238, he was named captain to defend the town of Gavardo against the forces of Frederick II, Holy Roman Emperor. Defeated, he was imprisoned for a few months at Cremona, where he found the time to start a writing career.

== Works ==
Albertanus read and was influenced by Seneca the Younger, Cicero, St. Augustine, the Wisdom literature of the Old Testament, and some 12th century authors.

His first work was De amore et dilectione Dei et proximi et aliarum rerum et de forma vitae ("On love and delight in God and in neighbor and other matters concerning the rule of life"; 1238), a treatise on Christian conceptions of life under religious rule which quotes frequently from Seneca the Younger's Epistulae morales ad Lucilium (64 AD). In 1245, he wrote the treatise De doctrina dicendi et tacendi ("On teaching about speech and silence"), which discussed the place of notaries in public life, and more generally explored the newly emerging role of the professional in public life.

Albertanus' best known work is his Liber consolationis et consilii ("Book of Consolation and Counsel"). Written in 1246, it dramatically investigates the causes of human violence by examining the urban vendetta. Geoffrey Chaucer's "The Tale of Melibee" is a close translation of Renaud de Louens' Livre de Melibee et de Dame Prudence (1336) which is itself a translation of Albertanus' Liber consolationis et consilii.

His last work is from 1250 and is a series of four sermons presented to his fellow causidici at Brescia, in which he explained the meaning of their rule.

In total, he was the author of three major treatises and five ‘sermons’, public addresses to his fellow causidici at their professional meetings.

A central goal from the start for Albertanus was to present a rule of life that would lay the foundation for a good society. He believed in the importance of moral restraint based on voluntary participation in a community.

== Reception and influence ==
Albertanus was very influential; his works were known and used by: Brunetto Latini, John Gower, Peter Idle, Erhart Gross, Geoffrey Chaucer, Renaut de Louens, Dirc Potter, Heinrich Schlüsselfelder, Antonio de Torquemada, Jan van Boendale, archbishop Pedro Gómez Barroso de Sotomayor, Bono Giamboni, Raymond de Béziers, Zucchero Bencivenni, the author of the Fiore di virtù, the author of the Cavallero Zifar, Guilhem Molinier, Christine de Pizan, Jacobus von Jüterbog, Aegidius Albertinus, and Fernando de Rojas.

There were many translations of his works into French, German, Tuscan, Venetian, Spanish, Catalan, and Dutch, with a wide circulation well into the 15th and early 16th centuries, a testament to his broader influence on society. The Tuscan version was made by Andrea of Grosseto, who was considered one of the first writers in the Italian language.

== Bibliography ==
- James M. Powell (1992). Albertanus of Brescia: The pursuit of happiness in the early thirteenth century, Philadelphia: University of Pennsylvania Press (ISBN 0-8122-3138-4)
- James M. Powell (2004). "Albertano Da Brescia" in Dictionary of the Middle Ages, Supplement 1.
- Angus Graham. "Albertanus of Brescia: A Preliminary Census of Vernacular Manuscripts." Studi Medieval 41 (2000): 891-924
