= Prosimetrum =

Poetic composition combining prose and verse

A prosimetrum (plural prosimetra) is a poetic composition which exploits a combination of prose (prosa) and verse (metrum); in particular, it is a text composed in alternating segments of prose and verse. It is widely found in Western and Eastern literature. While narrative prosimetrum may encompass at one extreme a prose story with occasional verse interspersed, and at the other, verse with occasional prose explanations, in true prosimetrum the two forms are represented in more equal measure. A distinction is sometimes drawn between texts in which verse is the dominant form and those in which prose dominates; there the terms prosimetrum and versiprose are applied respectively.

== Usage of term ==
The term prosimetrum is first attested in the Rationes dictandi of Hugh of Bologna, in the early 12th century. Sources differ on the date, one suggesting around 1119, another about 1130. Hugh divided metrical composition into three kinds: quantitative verse (carmina), verse based on syllable count and assonance (rithmi), and "the mixed form ... when a part is expressed in verse and a part in prose" (prosimetrum). The derived adjective prosimetrical occurs in English as early as Thomas Blount’s Glossographia (1656) where it is defined as "consisting partly of Prose, partly of Meteer or Verse".

Works such as historical chronicles and annals, which quote poetry previously composed by other authors, are not generally regarded as "true" prosimetra. In the Old Norse-Icelandic tradition, however, vernacular histories and family sagas that quote verses by other authors are commonly accepted as prosimetra. Researchers of Old Norse Íslendingasögur have recently made more extensive attempts at cataloging and systematically understanding the prosimetric aspects in that literary corpus.

Quoted or "inset" verses are a familiar feature of longer historical texts in the Old Irish and Middle Irish traditions as well. The role of such verse quotations within the prose narrative varies; they may be mined as historical source-material, cited as factual corroboration of an event or recited by a character as dialogue.

== Examples ==
- Satyricon (c. 1st century CE) by Petronius
- The Mahabharata (c. 4th century?)
- Consolation of Philosophy (c. 524) by Boethius
- One Thousand and One Nights (c. 8th century?)
- De rectoribus christianis, by Sedulius Scottus (9th century)
- Maqamat Badi' az-Zaman al-Hamadhani (10th century)
- The Ring of the Dove (c. 1022) by Ibn Hazm
- Cosmographia (c. 1147) by Bernard Silvestris
- De planctu Naturæ (c. 1168–72) by Alain de Lille
- Acallam na Senórach (c. 12th century)
- Buile Shuibhne (c. 12th century)
- Pantheon (1188) by Godfrey of Viterbo
- Gesta Danorum (c. 1208) by Saxo Grammaticus
- Aucassin et Nicolette (c. 13th century)
- The Secret History of the Mongols (c. 13th century)
- La Vita Nuova (c. 1295) by Dante Alighieri
- Eyrbyggja saga (c. 13th century)
- Grettis saga (c. 14th century)
- Arcadia (1504) by Sannazaro
- Diana (1559), by Jorge de Montemayor
- The Countess of Pembroke's Arcadia (1590), by Philip Sidney
- The Lover's Watch (1686), by Aphra Behn (translation of La Montre d'amour [1666] by Balthazar de Bonnecorse)
- Oku no Hosomichi (1694) by Matsuo Bashō
- Spring and All (1923) by William Carlos Williams
- In Parenthesis (1937) by David Jones
- Pale Fire (1962) by Vladimir Nabokov

== See also ==
- Menippus
- Haibun
- Maqāma

== Bibliography ==
- Dronke, Peter. Verse with Prose from Petronius to Dante. Cambridge, MA: Harvard University Press, 1994. ISBN 0-674-93475-X
- Green, Roland, et al., ed. The Princeton Encyclopedia of Poetry and Poetics. Princeton: Princeton University Press, 2012. ISBN 978-0-691-15491-6
- Harris, Joseph, and Karl Reichl, ed. Prosimetrum: Cross-Cultural Perspectives on Narrative in Prose and Verse. Cambridge, Eng.: D. S. Brewer, 1997. ISBN 0-85991-475-5
- Jones, Samuel, Aled Jones, and Jennifer Dukes Knight, ed. Proceedings of the Harvard Celtic Colloquium, 24/25, 2004 and 2005. Cambridge, MA: Harvard University Press, 2009. ISBN 978-0-674-03528-7
- O’Donoghue, Heather. Skaldic Verse and the Poetics of Saga Narrative. Oxford: Oxford University Press, 2005. ISBN 978-0-19-926732-3
- Ross, Margaret Clunies. A History of Old Norse Poetry and Poetics. Cambridge: D.S. Brewer, 2005. ISBN 978-1843842798
