= André Vernet =

André Vernet (18 April 1910 – 7 March 1999) was a French historian, specialising in medieval literature, and a member of the Institut de France.

== Life ==
Born in born Yzeure, André Vernet studied at the École nationale des chartes from 1933 to 1937, writing his thesis on Bernardus Silvestris's De mundi universitate. For a few months he worked in the manuscripts department of the Bibliothèque nationale de France but was quickly appointed secretary general of the École des chartes, with responsibility for the library, by Clovis Brunel. He held this position until 1955, alongside lecturing in paleography at the Sorbonne. In 1955, he was elected both to the chair of literary and narrative sources of French history at the École des chartes (succeeding Robert Bossuat) and to that of language and Latin literature of the Middle Ages at the École Pratique des Hautes Études. A specialist in the history of medieval texts, he studied the library of Clairvaux Abbey and edited the Middle Ages volume of the Histoire des bibliothèques françaises (history of French libraries). He was elected a member of the Académie des inscriptions et belles-lettres in June 1980. Vernet died in Paris in March 1999.
