= Ernst Lehrs =

Ernst Lehrs (30 July 1894 in Berlin – 31 December 1979 in Eckwälden, West Germany) was a German anthroposophist, Waldorf teacher, lecturer and writer.

== Life ==
Ernst Lehrs was born to assimilated Jewish–Protestant parents in Berlin. He volunteered for service at the beginning of World War I. After the war he studied natural sciences, completing his PhD in 1923.

Together with a number of his student friends, he discovered Anthroposophy in 1920 and had numerous personal meetings with Rudolf Steiner. The thoughts and ideas of these young people were welcomed by Rudolf Steiner and he entered fully into their wishes and striving. In this manner he learned to connect his past training in the natural sciences with the manner of thinking and investigation of Goethe, which determined the future direction of his research. Together with Wilhelm Rath he contributed significantly to the organisation of the youth conference in which Rudolf Steiner held the lecture cycle "The Younger Generation" and which led to the founding of an Esoteric Youth Circle. He describes this in his autobiography "Gelebte Erwartung".

After completing his studies he became senior teacher at the first Waldorf School in Stuttgart, beginning on a career as educator first of children and later in adult education. With the rise of National Socialism in Germany, he emigrated to the Netherlands in 1935, where he taught in a Waldorf school and then later to Britain. During a short period of internment he met Karl König in 1940, beginning a long relationship between the two. His best known work, Man or Matter, was first published in England.

Close ties of friendship connected him with the philosopher and close co-worker of Rudolf Steiner, Maria Röschl, who had been delegated with the task of founding the Youth Section at the Goetheanum. In 1939, they were married in England, pursuing a common commitment to young people and their possibilities of finding meaningful principles in life in our materialistic technological society. In 1952 the couple returned to Germany, where he worked as lecturer at the Seminar for Curative Education in Eckwälden until his death in 1979.

== Works ==
- Man or Matter, London 1951; Klostermann, Frankfurt am Main 1953; 3rd edition 1987. ISBN 3-465-00285-7.
- Der rosenkreuzerische Impuls im Leben und Werk von Joachim Jungius und Thomas Traherne. (The Rosicrucian entrepreneurial impulse in the life and work of Joachim Jungius and Thomas Traherne). Freies Geistesleben (Studien und Versuche 5), Stuttgart 1962.
- Vom Geist der Sinne: Zur Diätetik des Wahrnehmens. (From the mind of the senses: toward the dietetics of perceiving). Klostermann, Frankfurt am Main 1973, 3rd edition 1994. ISBN 978-3-465-02651-8.
- Spiritual Science, Electricity and Michael Faraday, London, 1975.
- Rosicrucian Foundations of the Age of Natural Science, Spring Valley, NY, 1976.
- Gelebte Erwartung. (Living expectation). Mellinger, Stuttgart, 1979. ISBN 3-88069-088-X.
