= Wilhelm Rath =

Wilhelm Rath (14 May 1897, in Berlin – 13 January 1973, in Wolfsburg/Kärnten, Austria) was a German writer, translator, bio-dynamic farmer and anthroposophist. He is best known for his research and translations of certain medieval mystics, notably the Friend of God from the Oberland, Bernard Silvestris, Alanus ab Insulis and John of Hildesheim.

Upon leaving school in 1914, he volunteered for active service and was taken captive towards the end of World War I. As a prisoner of war in England, he learned of Anthroposophy and took up contact with Rudolf Steiner after the war. He subsequently became committed to the work of biodynamic agriculture, which he pursued until his death.

With Ernst Lehrs he contributed significantly to the organisation of the youth conference in which Rudolf Steiner held the lecture cycle “The Younger Generation” and which led to the founding of an Esoteric Youth Circle.

== Works ==
- The Friend of God from the High Lands. Wilhelm Rath (Translation – Roland Everett). Hawthorn Press Ltd (1991), English ISBN 1869890345 ISBN 978-1869890346
- Imagery of the Goetheanum Glass Windows. Wilhelm Rath. Rudolf Steiner Press (March 1976) English, ISBN 0854403000 ISBN 978-0854403004
- Die deutsche Zarin. Wilhelm Rath. Salzwasser-Verlag GmbH (October 2012) German, ISBN 3846006718 ISBN 978-3846006719
- Aus der Schule von Chartres / Alanus ab Insulis: Der Anticlaudian: BD II. Translation - Wilhelm Rath, Mellinger Verlag (1966) ASIN B0000BNO52
- Aus der Schule von Chartres / Bernardus Silvestris: Über die allumfassende Einheit der Welt: BD 1. Translation - Wilhelm Rath, Mellinger, J Ch; Auflage: 3., Aufl. (1989) Deutsch ISBN 3880690707 ISBN 978-3880690707
- Die Legende von den Heiligen Drei Königen – Johannes von Hildesheim. Edited by Wilhelm Rath Mellinger; Auflage: 2., Aufl. (1980) Deutsch. ISBN 3880691525 ISBN 978-3880691520
- Das Buch vom Gral. Translation - Wilhelm Rath. Verl. Freies Geistesleben (1968) ASIN B0000BTCJ4
- Rudolf Steiner und Thomas von Aquino. Wilhelm Rath, Perseus Verlag; Auflage: 2. Bearb. u. erg. (November 2009) Deutsch ISBN 390756409X ISBN 978-3907564097
