= The Host (Canterbury Tales) =

Character in The Canterbury Tales

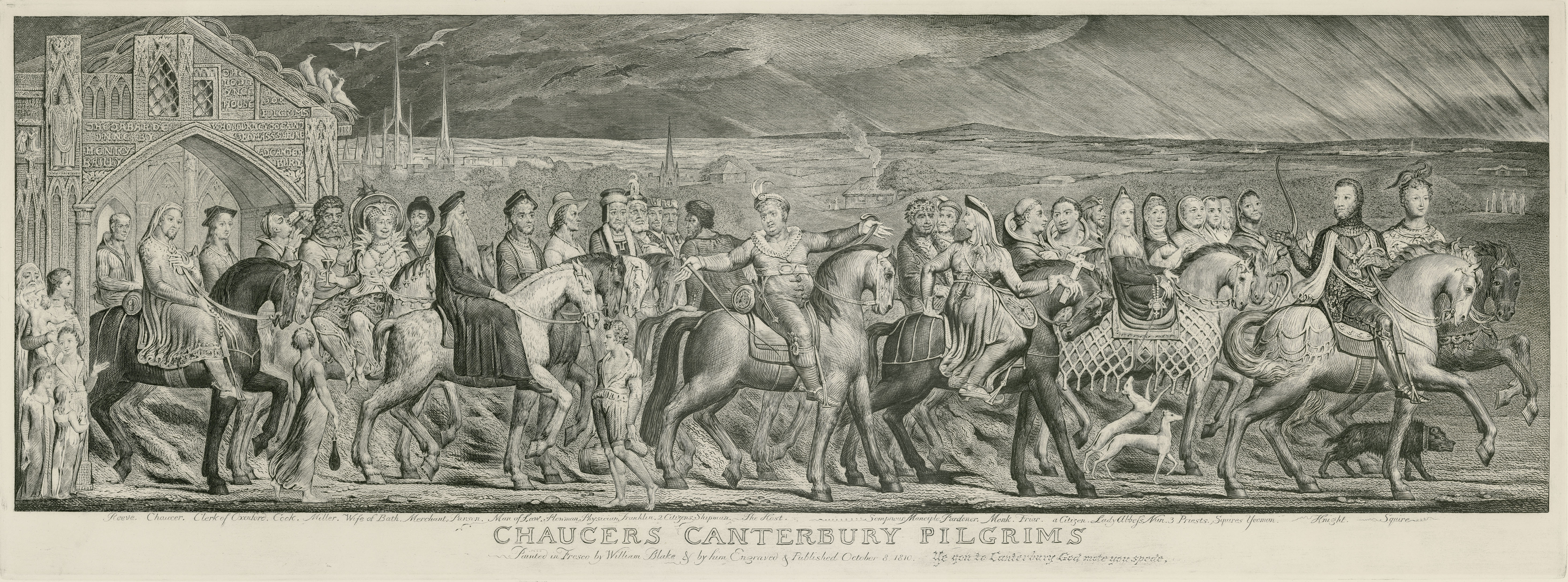
William Blake's The Canterbury Pilgrims with The Host in the middle

The Host (Harry Bailly or Harry Bailey) is a character who plays a key role in and throughout Geoffrey Chaucer's The Canterbury Tales. He is the owner of the Tabard Inn in London, where the pilgrimage begins and he agrees to travel on the pilgrimage, and promises to judge both the tales the pilgrims tell, and disputes among the pilgrims.

He discusses his marriage to his absent wife, Goodelief, when commenting on The Tale of Melibee with its message of patience . The Host says Goodelief is herself extremely impatient and speedy in urging him to violent revenge. Her name Goodelief may be a real name or just meaning, perhaps ironically, good dear one.
