= Tommaso Gozzadini =

Bolognese notary and public official

Tommaso Gozzadini (born 1260, died after 1329) was a Bolognese notary and public official of the Gozzadini family.

Tommaso (nicknamed Masino) was born in 1260 in Bologna. His parents were Giacomino Gozzadini, son of Minacio, and Cristiana, daughter of Ugolino. He had a brother named Minacio, who in 1311 married Pellegrina di Bongiovanni de' Zovenzoni. By 1307, Tommaso had married Margherita, daughter of Donusdeo della Stipa and widow of Angelello Angelelli. In accordance with the laws of the time, he had to pay back 119 lire of her dowry to her former father-in-law, Bonfante, but the latter returned it to Margherita.

Gozzadini was a notary public, entering the guild of notaries in 1289. Hundreds of deeds he drew up between then and 1329 survive in the Memoriali of Bologna. From 1295, he regularly held public office. Between June 1310 and February 1311, he was employed in compiling the Memoriali. He held the civic office of anziano (elder) in 1307, 1319 and 1329. He died sometime after January 1329.

Gozzadini has sometimes been identified as the author of the Fiore di virtù, originally composed between 1313 and 1323. This is based on the explicit of two manuscripts, one of which assigns the Fiore to a "brother Tommaso Gozzadini of the Order of Saint Benedict". If this is the notary, it implies that he retired in or after 1329 to a Benedictine monastery to complete his work.

== Bibliography ==
- Blanshei, Sarah R. (2010). Politics and Justice in Late Medieval Bologna. Brill.
- Milan, Gabriella (2002). "Gozzadini, Tommaso". Dizionario Biografico degli Italiani, Volume 58: Gonzales–Graziani (in Italian). Rome: Istituto dell'Enciclopedia Italiana. ISBN 978-8-81200032-6.
