= Godfrey of Viterbo =

Godfrey of Viterbo (c. 1120 – c. 1196) was a Roman Catholic chronicler, either Italian or German. From an early age he displayed great activity as one of the clergy at the court of Conrad III and later Frederick I, accompanying the latter on many of his campaigns, and frequently fulfilling diplomatic missions for him.

== Biography ==
He was probably an Italian by birth, although some authorities assert that he was a Saxon German like his imperial patrons. He evidently passed some of his early life at Viterbo in Italy, but he was educated at Bamberg, where he was taken by Lothair in 1133, gaining a good knowledge of Latin, possibly preparing for work in governmental service. Following his education, he began working in the Papal Chancellery. In the following years he was active in both governmental and ecclesiastical offices. About 1140 he became chaplain to the German king, Conrad III; but the greater part of his life was spent as secretary (notarius) in the service of the Holy Roman Emperor Frederick I Barbarossa, who appears to have thoroughly trusted him, and who employed him on many diplomatic errands, traveling extensively throughout Europe, including over forty trips to Rome. Incessantly occupied, he visited Sicily, France, and Spain, in addition to many of the German cities, in the emperor's interests, and was by his side during several of the Italian campaigns. As a reward for his services at court, lands were bestowed on him in fief, probably in 1169, at Viterbo where he also spent his concluding days.

Both before and after Frederick's death in 1190 he enjoyed the favor of his son, the emperor Henry VI.

In the politico-ecclesiastical conflicts of his time -the Conflict of Investiture- he sided with the emperor, without, however, declaring himself inimical to the pope. He blames Pope Alexander's predecessor, Hadrian, for the schism (see Papal election, 1159), inasmuch as the latter had allied himself with the Byzantines and Normans against the emperor.

== Works ==
His works were for the most part composed during his many official journeys. In light of his duties he was familiar with the highest levels of authority in both circles and collected historical material, in his own words, for over forty years as notary and chaplain to the Emperor Frederick. His writings sought to combine the goals of education, primarily through example, and entertainment. He was the first Latin writer to set history gleaned from documentary sources alongside reports of events he himself had witnessed and legends and fables from narrative sources, mingling different types of texts and sacred and secular history.

Godfrey's first historical work, the Speculum regum (Latin: Mirror of Kings), was completed in 1183 and dedicated the young king Henry VI, whom Godfrey probably taught. The work consists of two books of verse, preceded by a prose prologue, tracing two lines of genealogy which converge in the figure of Charlemagne to justify Henry VI as heir to the throne and reconcile the Romans and Germans.

Godfrey revised this work a few years later into the Memoria seculorum, or Liber memorialis, also dedicated to Henry VI, which professes to record the history of the world from the creation until 1185 when it was completed. It is written partly in prose and partly in verse.

This work was revised once more in 1187 as Pantheon, or Liber universalis with various changes and additions, including the incorporation of material from Otto of Freising's Chronica. Godfrey continued to revise the text over the following years, dedicating subsequent recensions to Pope Urban III and Pope Gregory VIII. The Pantheon was widely read and enormously influential on later medieval writers of histories, including Adam of Usk and Ptolemy of Lucca. The Pantheon was first printed in 1559, and extracts from it are published by L. A. Muratori in the Rerum Italicarum scriptores, tome vii (Milan, 1725).

Other minor works appeared alongside the Pantheon, including the Gesta Friderici I (Latin: The Deeds of Frederick I) and the Gesta Heinrici VI (Latin: The Deeds of Henry VI). The Gesta Friderici I relates events in the emperor's career from 1155 to 1180. Concerned mainly with affairs in Italy, the poem tells of the sieges of Milan, of Frederick's flight to Pavia in 1167, of the treaty with Pope Alexander III at Venice, and of other stirring episodes with which the author was intimately acquainted, and many of which he had witnessed. This metrical account of the achievements of Barbarossa, though not free from confusion, contains some valuable information. The Gesta Heinrici VI is a shorter poem. Although often attributed to Godfrey, his authorship of the verses in iambic septameters is subject to debate.

Another minor work is the Denominatio regnorum imperio subiectorum (Latin: A Description of the Kingdoms Subject to the Empire), a topographic description of the areas and town belonging to the Holy Roman Empire in the time of Frederick I, which only exists in a single manuscript.

=== Editions ===
Much of Godfrey's work can be found in Monumenta Germaniae historica, vol. 22 (Hanover, 1872). The Gesta Friderici I et Heinrici VI is published separately with an introduction by G. Waitz (Hanover, 1872).

== Sources and references ==
- H. Ulmann, Gottfried von Viterbo (Göttingen, 1863 dissertation)
- W. Wattenbach, Deutschlands Geschichtsquellen, Band ii.
