= Sir Thopas =

Part of the Canterbury Tales

"Sir Thopas" is one of The Canterbury Tales by Geoffrey Chaucer, published in 1387. The tale is one of two—together with The Tale of Melibee—told by the fictive Geoffrey Chaucer as he travels with the pilgrims on the journey to Canterbury Cathedral. The tale concerns the adventures of the knight Sir Thopas and his quest to win the elf-queen.

== Frame ==
The tale is one of two told by the fictive Chaucer, along with The Tale of Melibee, who figures as one of the pilgrims who are on a journey to the shrine of Thomas Becket in Canterbury Cathedral. The pilgrims are involved in a story-telling contest at the behest of the Host (Middle English: Hooste), Harry Bailly, the winner of which will receive a free meal at The Tabard Inn on their return.

Sir Thopas comes after The Prioress's Tale, a poem which is exemplary of the miracle of the Virgin genre and which tells the story of a child martyr killed by Jews. Seemingly wishing to counter the sombre mood that this tale instills in the pilgrims, the Host hails Chaucer and suggests that he: "Telle us a tale of myrth, and that anon" (line 706). Chaucer admits to having no tales to tell other than a "rym [he] lerned longe agoon" (line 709), and on the acceptance of the Host proceeds to tell the "Tale of Thopas".

Chaucer's portrait of himself is unflattering and humble. He presents himself as a reticent, maladroit figure who can barely summon a tale to mind. In comparison to the other travellers in the group, Chaucer the character is reluctant to speak, but when he does tell a tale, it is a rather frivolous burlesque very different from what went before.

== Synopsis ==
The poem begins with an introduction to Sir Thopas, detailing his birthplace of Flanders, describing his physical appearance and abilities in hunting. He desires the elf-queen but is waylaid by the giant Sir Olifaunt ("Elephant"). He runs back to his merry men for a feast of sweets and to ready for a battle with his giant foe. The tale is interrupted by the Host, though, for its tail rhyme format, and is never finished. The tale is a parody of romances, with their knights and fairies and absurdities, and Chaucer the author satirises not only the grandiose, Gallic romances, but also the readership of such tales.

The tale is a hodgepodge of many of the popular stories of the time which even apes their simple rhymes, a style Chaucer uses nowhere else. Elements of deliberate anticlimax abound in as much of the poem as Chaucer is allowed to present. The knight's name is in fact topaz, one of the more common gemstones; in Chaucer's day, "topaz" included any yellowish quartz. The knight hails from Flanders, which earlier had been a favourite haunt of errant knights but in Chaucer's time was better known for prosaic merchants. In the only scene of derring-do that Chaucer tells in the two and a half chapters he gets in, Sir Thopas flees the battle, pelted by stones. The poem thus contains many suggestions that it was intended in a mock-heroic sense.

== Analysis ==
=== Genre and structure ===
Thopas is the first of what is usually called the surprise group of tales, as each is quite different from the preceding and they are seemingly written to confound expectations. The host, Harry Bailey, does not seem to appreciate this new style of tale and he interrupts Chaucer, telling him that "thy drasty rymyng is nat worth a toord".

The character Chaucer then tells the laborious and dull debate of the Tale of Melibeus. Again, this is in keeping with the character Chaucer: a man of too much learning and too little experience. The tale is full of moral sentiment and philosophy, but it is fairly slow for modern readers.

=== Critical history ===
When Chaucer began to be treated as a treasure of English letters after his death, his satiric intent was lost. Into the eighteenth century, readers regarded Harry Bailey's interruption as a sign of poor breeding, and they treated the tale of Sir Thopas itself as a great work. It was Thomas Warton who first suggested (at least in print) that Chaucer was not serious, that the whole tale is a parody and that the character of Geoffrey Chaucer must not be confused with Geoffrey Chaucer the author.

== Film adaptations ==
Pasolini adapted this story for his film The Canterbury Tales. He shot the scene at Mt Etna in Sicily. He later removed the scene and it is now considered lost. A recreation of this scene with film stills can be seen however in the documentary The Secret Humiliation of Chaucer.
