= Francesco Selmi =

Italian chemist and one of the founders of colloid chemistry

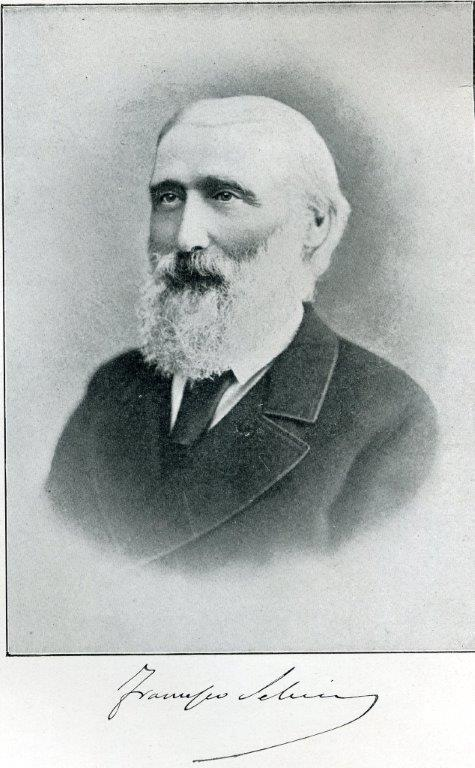
- Born: 7 April 1817; Vignola, Duchy of Modena and Reggio
- Died: 13 August 1881 (aged 64); Vignola, Kingdom of Italy
- Education: Modena
- Known for: Colloidal chemistry, Toxicology
- Scientific career
- Fields: chemistry

Francesco Selmi (7 April 1817 – 13 August 1881) was an Italian chemist and patriot, one of the founders of colloid chemistry.

Selmi was born in Vignola, then part of the Duchy of Modena and Reggio. He became head of a chemistry laboratory in Modena in 1840, and a professor of chemical pharmacology and toxicology at the University of Bologna in 1867. He published the first systematic study of inorganic colloids, in particular silver chloride, Prussian blue, and sulfur, in the period 1845–50. He died in Vignola on the 13th of August, 1881, at age 64, due to sepsis that he contracted while dissecting a dead animal for his research on typhoid fever.

== Life ==
In 1839, he earned a master's degree in pharmacy from the University of Modena. He taught chemistry first at the Reggio Emilia high school, then at the University of Modena.

Distinguished for his studies on colloidal states, fermentation, and electroplating, he was forced to flee to Turin after being caught up in the 1848 uprisings and sentenced to death by the Duke of Modena. That same year, he founded the Giornale di Reggio in Reggio Emilia with Gherardo Strucchi. He refused the financial support the Piedmontese state offered to political refugees and asked to be allowed to teach. Consequently, he was appointed professor of physics, chemistry, and mechanics at the National College of Turin. In Turin, where he was welcomed by his friend Ascanio Sobrero, he conducted important research, including the discovery of lead tetrachloride.

During his time in Piedmont, he formed bonds with other exiles and was among the founders of the National Society for the Unification of Italy, along with Giuseppe La Farina, with whom he became friend. Cavour held Selmi in high regard, as evidenced by their correspondence. Together with Luigi Zini, he promoted the uprising of the Duchy of Modena and its annexation to Piedmont in 1859. As a deputy for the province of Modena, he was part of the delegation that brought the results of the plebiscite to Turin. On that occasion, he was awarded honorary citizenship, along with Giuseppe Verdi, the latter deputy for the province of Parma. He also served briefly as rector of the University of Modena.[1]

During his Piedmontese exile, he frequented the literary salon of Baroness Olimpia Savio, in whose memoirs he is quoted extensively. He served as superintendent of education in Turin and director general of the Ministry of Education.

== Chemistry ==
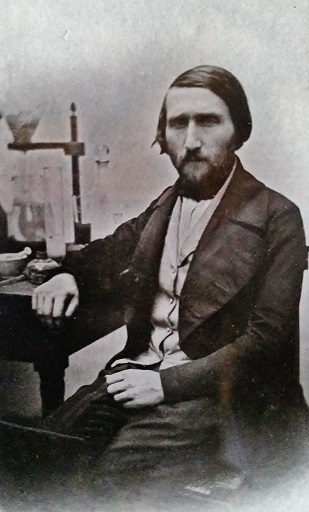
Francesco Selmi in his laboratory

Between 1845 and 1850, he published the first systematic studies on colloids, particularly on silver chloride,[2] Prussian Blue,[3][4] and sulfur compounds,[5], identifying their main properties and distinguishing between true solutions and pseudosolutions.[6][7][8]. In 1855, he invented the triple-contact battery. The advantages of the new battery were its constant voltage, its low cost compared to existing batteries, its simplicity of construction and maintenance, and the absence of harmful fumes. The battery was used continuously in the Turin telegraph station from December 1856 until May 1857, where up to 100 cells were installed. In 1857, together with Giuseppe Clementi, he founded Il Tecnico. A monthly periodical for the application of physical sciences to social uses, mainly addressed to municipalities, technical institutes, agronomists and industrial workshops. He was among the founders, in 1870, of the scientific journal Gazzetta Chimica Italiana. From 1868 onwards, he directed the publication of the Encyclopedia of Chemistry in 11 volumes, to which he added another 3 volumes of Complement and Supplement.[9]. He collaborated with Ascanio Sobrero on the preparation of lead tetrachloride. A few years after the unification of Italy, he left his ministerial career in Turin and, starting in 1867, took up the chair of pharmaceutical and toxicological chemistry at the University of Bologna. At the Bologna headquarters, Selmi began working in the previously unknown field of toxicological chemistry. He became the founder of modern forensic toxicology with the discovery of ptomaines, or cadaveric alkaloids, culminating in the seminal monograph on ptomaines in 1878. This brought him international fame, and the Ministry of Justice established the National Commission for Poison Evidence, of which he was appointed president. Selmi's studies were responsible for saving many people falsely accused of poisoning, based on previously empirical and inaccurate scientific evidence. He died in Vignola in 1881, a victim of science and his tireless pursuit of research, having contracted the virus while dissecting a dead animal to study typhoid fever toxins. The life of Francesco Selmi, in particular his involvement in the Risorgimento uprisings and the discovery of ptomaine, inspired the volume Amaro in bocca [10], a collection of stories published on the occasion of the 2nd centenary of his birth.

== Studies on Dante and the Italian language ==
During his Piedmontese period he also studied Dante, with particular reference to philology and the comparison of the lexical variants of the codices relating to the Divine Comedy[11][12]. In 1865 he published the it:Chiose Selmi, or anonymous glosses on the first canticle of the Divine Comedy, a collection of interpretations of the allegories contained in the first canto of the Inferno. In 1873 he published the Trattati morali di Albertano da Brescia. The treatises referred to in the title are a 13th-century Latin text, written by Albertano da Brescia and translated into the vernacular in 1268 by Andrea da Grosseto. The text by Andrea da Grosseto was discovered by Selmi in 1863 in the Magliabechiana library, now the National Central Library of Florence, as part of his research on Dante Alighieri. Selmi makes a philological analysis of Andrea da Grosseto's text and of the Latin versions of the original work, to which he adds numerous observations in the notes, and certain of the importance of the rediscovered text, he comments in the warning: "the oldest monument of the literary Italian language".

== Awards and honors ==
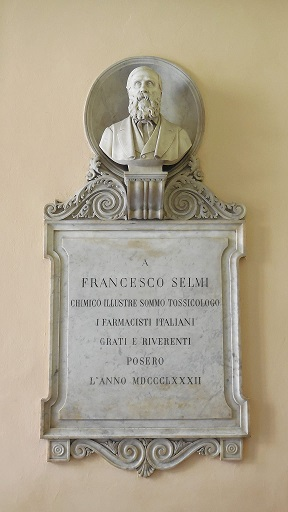
Monument in memory of Francesco Selmi, Rector's Palace of the University of Bologna

Streets in Modena, Bologna, Rome, Vignola, Sassuolo, Parabiago have been named after Francesco Selmi. In Vignola, the local municipal library has also been named after him, which preserves the Francesco Selmi Documentary Collection with laboratory material and documents, some of which are still unpublished, donated by M° Giovanni Bartoli, last direct heir of Francesco Selmi. In Modena, there is the "Francesco Selmi" Higher Education Institute. In 1868, he was named Knight of the Order of the Crown of Italy and in 1874, at the proposal of the Ministry of Public Education, Commander. In 1890, a new chemistry periodical[1], published in Pavia until 1898, was named after the chemist from Vignola.

== Scientific works ==
- Francesco Selmi, Studj sopra l'albumina con una nota sopra un nuovo metodo per depurare il vetriolo di ferro, Milano: Tipografia Guglielmini e Redaelli, 1842
- Francesco Selmi, Intorno agli acidi anidri, agli acidi idratati all'ufficio che compie l'acqua nelle combinazioni coi medesimi e cogli ossidi in genere ed alla costituzione del tartaro emetico, memoria diretta in forma di lettera al ch. professor Bartolomeo Bizio da Francesco Selmi, Modena: eredi Soliani, 1843
- Francesco Selmi, Studi di chimica molecolare; Intorno all'iodido mercurico in soluzione e sunto di varie esperienze; Intorno all'azione che reciprocamente esercitano l'iodio, l'acido iodidrico e vari binari, Milano: 1844
- Francesco Selmi, Manuale dell'arte d'indorare e d'inargentare coi metodi elettro-chimici e per semplice immersione, compilato da Francesco Selmi ad uso degli artefici italiani, Reggio Emilia, Torreggiani, 1844.
- Francesco Selmi, Intorno all'azione dell'iodio sopra il clorido di mercurio: memoria prima di Francesco Selmi, Milano: V. Guglielmini, 1845
- Francesco Selmi, Studi sperimentali e teorici di chimica molecolare: fascicoli I e II, Modena: 1846
- Francesco Selmi, Studio intorno alle pseudo-soluzioni degli azzurri di Prussia ed alla influenza dei sali nel guastarle, Bologna: Tipi Sassi, 1847
- Francesco Selmi, Usi dell'ammoniaca e de' suoi composti in farmacia, Bologna: Tipi Sassi, 1847
- Francesco Selmi, Prolusione detta da Francesco Selmi nella scuola di chimica del R. liceo di Reggio il giorno 15 ottobre 1843 incominciando un corso di lezioni intorno a questa scienza
- Francesco Selmi, Intorno alla solubilità dell'ammoniuro d'oro in varii cianuri, Torino: Stamperia Reale, 1847
- Francesco Selmi, Principii elementari di chimica organica, Torino: cugini Pomba & C., 1851
- Francesco Selmi, Intorno al solfo pseudosolubile, alla pseudosoluzione di esso, ed al solfo molle, Giornale Veneto di Scienze Mediche, Vol.3, Tipografia Andreola, Venezia, 1851
- Francesco. Selmi, Giuseppe Missaghi, Intorno al solfo vischioso e ad un nuovo modo di ottenere il solfo in grossi cristalli ottaedrici. Il Nuovo Cimento, Vol.2, 381-387, Tipografia Pieraccini, Pisa, 1855
- Francesco. Selmi, Giuseppe Missaghi, Analisi chimica del guano sardo. Il Nuovo Cimento, Vol.2, 23-40, Tipografia Pieraccini, Pisa, 1855
- Francesco Selmi, Principii elementari di chimica minerale per uso dell'insegnamento ginnasiale, liceale ed universitario, 2ª Edizione, Torino: Unione Tipografico-Editrice., 1856
- Francesco Selmi, Notizia sulla pila a triplice contatto e sugli usi di essa nella telegrafia elettrica, nella elettro-metallurgia ecc., Torino: Unione Tipografico-Editrice, 1857
- Francesco Selmi, Studi di tossicologia chimica: (seconda serie), Bologna: tipi Gamberini e Parmeggiani, 1872
- Francesco Selmi, Studi di chimica tossicologica : nuovo processo generale per l'estrazione delle sostanze venefiche nei casi di avvelenamento, Bologna : tipi Gamberini e Parmeggiani, 1874
- Francesco Selmi, Sulle difficoltà che s'incontrano nelle ricerche tossicologiche, Bologna: Gamberini e Parmeggiani, 1875
- Francesco Selmi, Nuovo processo generale per la ricerca delle sostanze venefiche con appendici di argomenti tossicologici od affini, Bologna, Zanichelli, 1875
- Francesco Selmi, Sulle ptomaine od alcaloidi cadaverici e loro importanza in tossicologia, osservazioni del prof. Francesco Selmi aggiuntavi una perizia per la ricerca della morfina, Bologna: N. Zanichelli, 1878
- Francesco Selmi, Intorno allo sviluppo di prodotti fosforati dai cadaveri; Sui prodotti fosforati volatili che si svolgono durante la putrefazione lenta dell'albume e del tuorlo d'ova; Dell'accelerazione che il fosforo e gl'ipofosfiti inducono nella reazione tra l'acido solforico e lo zinco e sua applicazione alla tossicologia: tre memorie, Bologna: Tip. Gamberini & Parmeggiani, 1878
- Francesco Selmi, Sulla genesi degli alcaloidi venefici che si formano nei cadaveri: osservazioni, Annali di Chimica Applicata alla Medicina, Vol.67, Serie III, Milano, Fratelli Richiedei Editori, 1879
- Francesco Selmi, Tossicologia chimica dell'arsenico, Gazzetta chimica italiana, X, 1880
- Francesco Selmi, Ricerca del fosforo nelle urine in caso di avvelenamento e prodotti che vi si riscontrano, Memorie della Accademia delle Scienze dell'Istituto di Bologna, Serie IV, Tomo I, p.275-289, Bologna: Tip. Gamberini & Parmeggiani, 1880
- Francesco Selmi, Esame dell'urina di un itterico grave in correlazione coll'esame di un'urina fosforata, Memorie della Accademia delle Scienze dell'Istituto di Bologna, Serie IV, Tomo I, p.291-293, Bologna: Tip. Gamberini & Parmeggiani, 1880
- Francesco Selmi, Sulla fallacia del reattivo di Van-Deen per determinare le macchie di sangue, Memorie della Accademia delle Scienze dell'Istituto di Bologna, Serie IV, Tomo I, p.294-297, Bologna: Tip. Gamberini & Parmeggiani, 1880
- Francesco Selmi, Sopra due arsine formatesi in uno stomaco di maiale salato coll'anidride arseniosa, Memorie della Accademia delle Scienze dell'Istituto di Bologna, Serie IV, Tomo I, p.299-305, Bologna: Tip. Gamberini & Parmeggiani, 1880
- Francesco Selmi, Ptomaine od alcaloidi cadaverici e prodotti analoghi da certe malattie in correlazione colla medicina legale, Bologna: N. Zanichelli, 1881

== Literary works ==
- Francesco Selmi, il Favoleggiatore, ossia raccolta di favole in lingua volgare scelte, emendate e purgate non che opportunamente annotate ad usum serenissimi saeculi XIX dal M. di S., Torino, Tip. di G.B. Paravia e Comp., 1857
- Francesco Selmi, La Lingua Nazionale nell'Italia Nuova, Rivista Contemporanea, Anno IX, Vol. 27, Fascicolo XCVII, Dicembre 1861, Torino, Unione Tip. Editrice, 1861
- Francesco Selmi, Carlo Matteucci, Unione Tipografico-Editrice, Torino, 1862
- Francesco Selmi, Chiose anonime alla prima cantica della Divina Commedia di un contemporaneo del poeta; pubblicate per la prima volta a celebrare il sesto anno secolare della nascita di Dante, Torino, Stamperia Reale, 1865
- Francesco Selmi, Battista Cannatelli, ossia Modena dopi il 1831, Stamperia Del Vaglio, Napoli, 1866
- Francesco Selmi, Dei trattati morali di Albertano da Brescia volgarizzamento inedito fatto nel 1268 da Andrea da Grosseto, Editore Gaetano Romagnoli, Bologna, 1873

== Bibliography ==
- Ascanio Sobrero, Commemorazione del professore Francesco Selmi, socio corrispondente dell'accademia, Atti della Reale Accademia delle scienze di Torino, Vol.17 1881-82, Torino: Ermanno Loescher, 1882
- Cesare Stroppa, Sulla vita e sulle opere di Francesco Selmi : ricordi di Cesrae Stroppa, Firenze, Stabilimento di G. Pellas, 1882
- Dioscoride Vitali, Francesco Selmi patriota, letterato e scienziato : commemorazione letta nella società agraria di Bologna, Roma, Tip. alle Terme Diocleziane, 1885
- Giovanni Canevazzi, Francesco Selmi patriotta, letterato, scienziato : con Appendice di Lettere inedite, Modena : Tip.-lit. Forghieri e Pellequi, 1903
- Ignazio Cantù, L'Italia scientifica contemporanea, notizie sugli Italiani ascritti ai primi cinque congressi, attinte alle fonti più autentiche, Milano: vedova di A.F. Stella e Giacomo figlio, 1844, pp. 115–116
- Icilio Guareschi, Francesco Selmi e la sua opera scientifica , Memorie della Reale Accademia delle Scienze di Torino, Serie II, Tomo LXII, Torino: Libreria Fratelli Bocca, 1912
- Giovanni Bartoli, Francesco De Fazio, Michele Amorosa, Francesco Selmi, L'uomo, lo scienziato, il politico, Vignola: Comune di Vignola, 1981
- Gianmarco Ieluzzi, Francesco Selmi e i sistemi colloidali, Rendiconti della Accademia Nazionale delle Scienze Detta Dei XL, Memorie di Scienze Fisiche e Naturali, Serie V, Vol. XXIX, Parte II, Tomo II, Roma, 2005
- Marco Ciardi, Francesco Selmi e la chimica torinese nell'età del Risorgimento, Atti del XI Convegno nazionale di storia e fondamenti della chimica, p. 79-88, Torino, 2005
- Marco Ciardi, Reazioni tricolori - Aspetti della chimica italiana nell'età del Risorgimento, Franco Angeli, 2010
- Marco Ciardi, Francesco Selmi, Dizionario Biografico degli Italiani, Istituto dell'Enciclopedia Italiana fondata da Giovanni Treccani, Vol.91, Stamperia Artistica Nazionale S.p.A., Torino, 2018
- Piero Venturelli, Francesco Selmi: scienze e lettere per unire l'Italia e fare gli italiani: un'intervista ad Achille Ludovisi
- Fabiana Fraulini, Francesco Selmi e i Trattati morali di Albertano da Brescia, «Bibliomanie. Letterature, storiografie, semiotiche», 38, no. 1, gennaio/aprile 2015
