= Bernardus Silvestris =

12th-century Platonist philosopher and poet

Bernardus Silvestris, also known as Bernard Silvestris and Bernard Silvester, was a medieval Platonist philosopher and poet of the 12th century.

== Biography ==
Little is known about Bernardus's life. In the nineteenth century, it was assumed that Bernardus was the same person as Bernard of Chartres, but the scholarly consensus is now that the two were different people. There is little evidence connecting Bernardus to Chartres, yet his work is consistent with the scholarship associated with Chartres in the twelfth century and is in that sense "Chartrian". Bernardus dedicated his Cosmographia to Thierry of Chartres, who became chancellor of Chartres in 1141; he most likely wrote the letter in order to win the favour of a powerful figure, known for his interest in science.

André Vernet, who edited Bernardus' Cosmographia, believed that he lived from 1085 to 1178. The most secure date in his life is 1147–48, when the Cosmographia was supposedly read to Pope Eugene III, though it could have been finished before then, perhaps between 1143 and 1148. There is some evidence that Bernardus was connected to Spanish schools of philosophy, but it seems likely that he was born and taught in Tours, because of the intimate descriptions of the city and the surrounding area found in the Cosmographia. Later medieval authors also associated him with that city.

== Works ==
Bernardus' greatest work is the aforementioned Cosmographia, a prosimetrum on the creation of the world, told from a 12th-century Platonist perspective. This work influenced Chaucer and others with its pioneering use of allegory to discuss metaphysical and scientific questions. Its Christian neo-Platonism was most clearly prefigured in the Periphyseon of the 9th-century Irish theologian John Scotus Eriugena.

Bernardus also wrote the poem Mathematicus and probably the poem Experimentarius as well as some minor poems. Among the works attributed to Bernardus later in the Middle Ages were a commentary on Virgil's Aeneid (Bernardus' authorship of which has been questioned by modern scholars) and a commentary on Martianus Capella's De Nuptiis Philologiae et Mercurii. The commentary on the Aeneid is the longest medieval commentary on that work, although it is incomplete, ending about two-thirds of the way through book six.

=== Authorship of Aeneid commentary ===
Julian Ward Jones, Jr., in his article "The So-Called Silvestris Commentary on the Aeneid and Two Other Interpretations", attempts to clear up the issue of the authorship of the Aeneid commentary by distinguishing two distinct positions: the first by E. R. Smits, and the second by Christopher Baswell. Smits's account is rejected by Jones, who says that Baswell's account is mostly correct but requires some modification.

E. R. Smits, like André Vernet (1938), hypothesizes that Carnotensis (the pen-name of the commentary) is Bernard of Chartres – the individual who Silvestris is most confused with. Vernet says that Silvestris, for whom this confusion was normally detrimental, probably gained from this particular confusion, as he is most often credited for the commentary on Vergil's Aeneid. Smits and Vernet attribute Bernard of Chartres's authorship of the Aeneid commentary to a number of similarities and differences between this work and other texts.

On the other hand, Christopher Baswell attempts to interpret the Aeneid commentary through comparison to a commentary in Cambridge manuscript Peterhouse 158, seeing this as an important link between manuscripts of the commentary and the Silvestris commentary. By placing the passages in two columns, Baswell shows that the interpretations are congruent, although the notes in the Peterhouse MS appear to be shortened and simpler versions of notes in the Silvestris commentary. Baswell concludes that the Peterhouse MS represents an earlier version by Silvestris. Jones sets this conclusion aside, citing differences that in his opinion are more important than the striking similarities. By pointing to differences in organization among other things, Jones casts doubt on Baswell's hypothesis. Although Baswell and Jones both see Silvestris as the Aeneid commentator, Jones does not agree with the connection to the Peterhouse MS.

== Influence and contributions ==
The Cosmographia influenced Chaucer and others with its pioneering use of allegory to discuss metaphysical and scientific questions. Theodore Silverstein praises Silvestris' works for their imaginative prose, as well as for positioning himself well in literature based on the time and place—particularly in the writing of the Cosmographia during the 12th-century controversies of evolution. In the Catholic Encyclopedia, William Turner wrote that there was a "pantheistic drift" to his philosophy.

There is evidence of influence in the works of medieval and renaissance authors, including Hildegard of Bingen, St. Bonaventure, Vincent of Beauvais, Dante, Chaucer, Nicolas of Cusa, and Boccaccio. In the modern era, Bernardus Silvestris has been referred to in the nonfiction and science fiction work of C. S. Lewis.

== Editions and translations ==
- Mathematicus, ed. and trans. Deirdre M. Stone, Archives d'histoire doctrinale et littéraire du moyen âge 63 (1996): 209–83.
- Experimentarius, ed. Charles Burnett, in "What Is the Experimentarius of Bernardus Silvestris?: A Preliminary Survey of the Material," Archives d'histoire doctrinale et littéraire du moyen âge 44 (1977): 62–108. Reprinted in Burnett, Magic and Divination in the Middle Ages (Aldershot: Variorum, 1996). ISBN 0-86078-615-3
- The Commentary on the First Six Books of the Aeneid of Virgil Commonly Attributed to Bernardus Silvestris, ed. Julian Ward Jones and Elizabeth Frances Jones (Lincoln: University of Nebraska Press, 1977). ISBN 0-8032-0898-7
- The Commentary on the First Six Books of Virgil's Aeneid, trans. Earl G. Schreiber and Thomas E. Maresca (Lincoln: University of Nebraska Press, 1979). ISBN 0-8032-4108-9

== See also ==
- Allegory in the Middle Ages

== Bibliography ==
- Desmond, Marilynn, "Bernardus Silvestris and the Corpus of the Aeneid," in The Classics in the Middle Ages, ed. Aldo S. Bernardo and Saul Levin (Binghamton: Centre for Medieval and Early Renaissance Studies, 1990).
- Dronke, Peter, Fabula: Explorations into the Uses of Myth in Medieval Platonism (Leiden: Brill, 1974).
- ———, "Bernard Silvestris: Nature and Personification," in Intellectuals and Poets in Medieval Europe (Rome: Edizioni di storia e letteratura, 1992).
- Jeauneau, Édouard, "Bernard Silvestre," in Dictionary of Scientific Biography, vol. 2 (New York: Scribner's, 1970): 21–22. ISBN 0-684-10114-9
- Jones, Julian Ward, "The So-Called Silvestris Commentary on the Aeneid and Two Other Interpretations," Speculum 64 (1989): 838-48.
- Kauntze, Mark, Authority and Imitation: A Study of the 'Cosmographia' of Bernardus Silvestris, Mittellateinische Studien und Texte, 47 (Leiden: Brill, 2014). ISBN 978-9004 256910.
- Stock, Brian, Myth and Science in the Twelfth Century: A Study of Bernard Silvester (Princeton: Princeton University Press, 1972). ISBN 0-691-05201-8
- Wetherbee, Winthrop, Platonism and Poetry in the Twelfth Century: The Literary Influence of the School of Chartres (Princeton: Princeton University Press, 1972). ISBN 0-691-06219-6
