= On the Consolation of Philosophy =

Philosophical work by Boethius

The Consolation of Philosophy
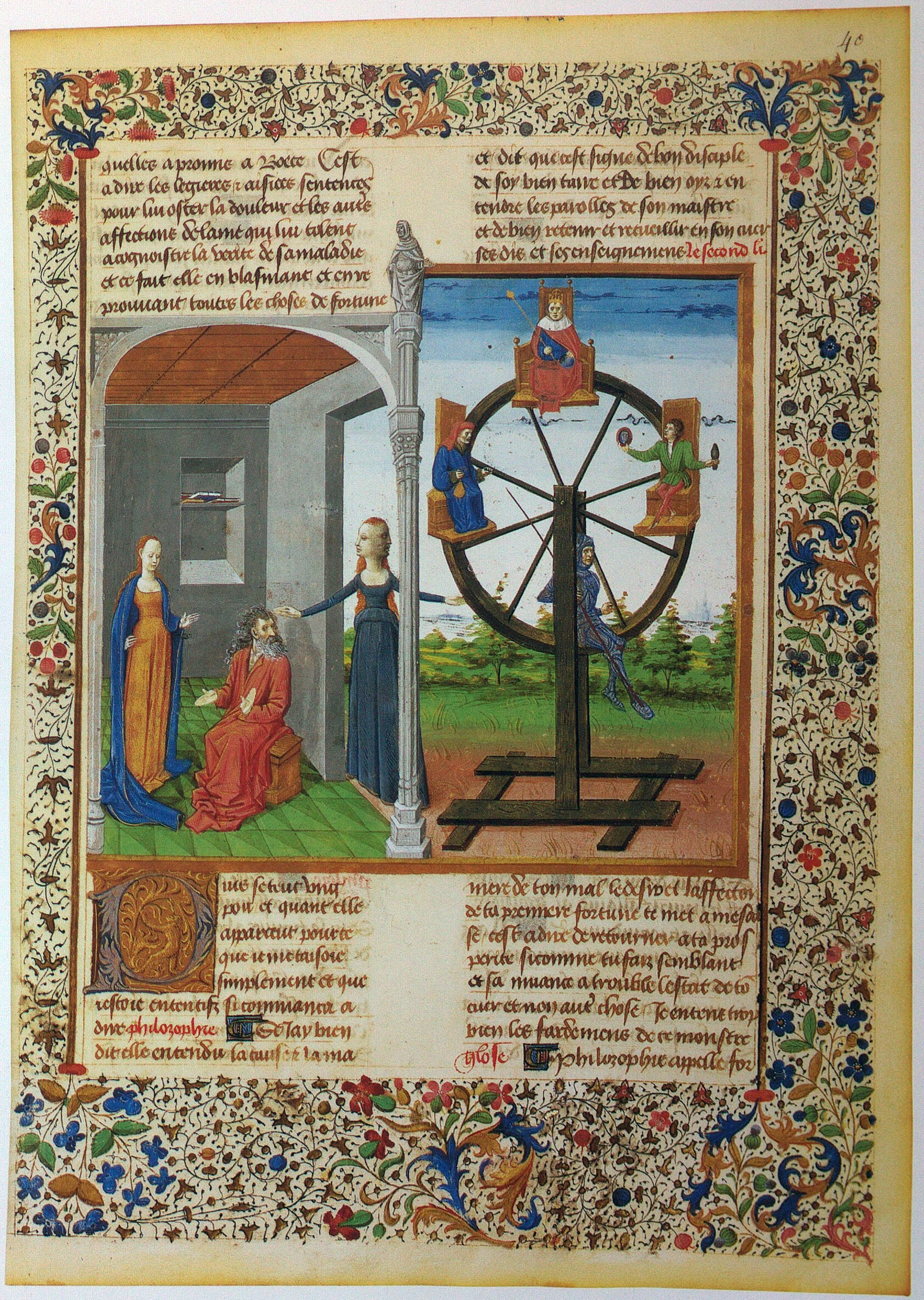
- Page from a 15th-century French manuscript
- Author: Boethius
- Translators: Alfred the Great; Henry Rosher James; Jean de Meun; Notker Labeo; Geoffrey Chaucer; Elizabeth I
- Language: Latin
- Subject: Fate, Christian theology
- Publication date: 524
- English publication date: Late 9th century (Old English) (by King Alfred the Great); Mid-14th century (Middle English)
- Dewey Decimal: 082.1
- Original text: The Consolation of Philosophy at Latin Wikisource
- Translation: The Consolation of Philosophy at Wikisource

On the Consolation of Philosophy (Latin: De consolatione philosophiae), often titled as The Consolation of Philosophy or simply the Consolation, is a philosophical work by the Roman philosopher and Christian theologian Boethius. Written in 523 while he was imprisoned and awaiting execution by the Ostrogothic King Theodoric, it is often described as the last great Western work of the Classical Period. Boethius's Consolation heavily influenced the philosophy of late antiquity, as well as Medieval and early Renaissance Christianity.

== Description ==
On the Consolation of Philosophy was written in AD 523 during a one-year imprisonment Boethius served while awaiting trial—and eventual execution—for the alleged crime of treason under the Ostrogothic King Theodoric the Great. Boethius was at the very heights of power in Rome, holding the prestigious office of magister officiorum, and was brought down by treachery. This experience inspired the text, which reflects on how evil can exist in a world governed by God (an example of theodicy), and how happiness is still attainable amidst fickle fortune, while also considering the nature of happiness and God. In 1891, the academic Hugh Fraser Stewart described the work as "by far the most interesting example of prison literature the world has ever seen."

Boethius writes the book as a conversation between himself and a female personification of philosophy, referred to as "Lady Philosophy". Philosophy consoles Boethius by discussing the transitory nature of wealth, fame, and power ("no man can ever truly be secure until he has been forsaken by Fortune"), and the ultimate superiority of things of the mind, which she calls the "one true good". She contends that happiness comes from within, and that virtue is all that one truly has because it is not imperiled by the vicissitudes of fortune.

Boethius engages with the nature of predestination and free will, the problem of evil and the "problem of desert", human nature, virtue, and justice. He speaks about the nature of free will and determinism when he asks whether God knows and sees all, or whether man has free will. On human nature, Boethius says that humans are essentially good, and only when they give in to "wickedness" do they "sink to the level of being an animal." On justice, he says criminals are not to be abused, but rather treated with sympathy and respect, using the analogy of doctor and patient to illustrate the ideal relationship between prosecutor and criminal.

=== Outline ===
On the Consolation of Philosophy is laid out as follows:

- Book I: Boethius laments his imprisonment before he is visited by Philosophy, personified as a woman.
- Book II: Philosophy illustrates the capricious nature of Fate by discussing the "wheel of Fortune"; she further argues that true happiness lies in the pursuit of wisdom.
- Book III: Building on the ideas laid out in the previous book, Philosophy explains how wisdom has a divine source; she also demonstrates how many earthly goods (e.g., wealth and beauty) are fleeting at best.
- Book IV: Philosophy and Boethius discuss the nature of good and evil, with Philosophy offering several explanations concerned with evil events and why the wicked can never attain true happiness.
- Book V: Boethius asks Philosophy about the role Chance plays in the order of everything. Philosophy argues that Chance is guided by Providence. Boethius then asks Philosophy about the compatibility of an omniscient God and free will.

== Interpretation ==
In the Consolation, Boethius answered religious questions without reference to Christianity, relying solely on natural philosophy and the Classical Greek tradition. He believed in the correspondence between faith and reason. The truths found in Christianity would be no different from the truths found in philosophy. In the words of Henry Chadwick, "If the Consolation contains nothing distinctively Christian, it is also relevant that it contains nothing specifically pagan either...[it] is a work written by a Platonist who is also a Christian."

Boethius repeats the Macrobius model of the Earth in the center of a spherical cosmos.

The philosophical message of the book fits well with the religious piety of the Middle Ages. Boethius encouraged readers not to pursue worldly goods such as money and power, but to seek internalized virtues. Evil had a purpose, to provide a lesson to help change for good; while suffering from evil was seen as virtuous. Because God ruled the universe through Love, prayer to God and the application of Love would lead to true happiness. The Middle Ages, with their vivid sense of an overruling fate, found in Boethius an interpretation of life closely akin to the spirit of Christianity. The Consolation stands, by its note of fatalism and its affinities with the Christian doctrine of humility, midway between the pagan philosophy of Seneca the Younger and the later Christian philosophy of consolation represented by Thomas à Kempis.

The book is heavily influenced by Plato and his dialogues (as was Boethius himself). Its popularity can in part be explained by its Neoplatonic and Christian ethical messages, although current scholarly research is still far from clear exactly why and how the work became so vastly popular in the Middle Ages.

== Influence ==
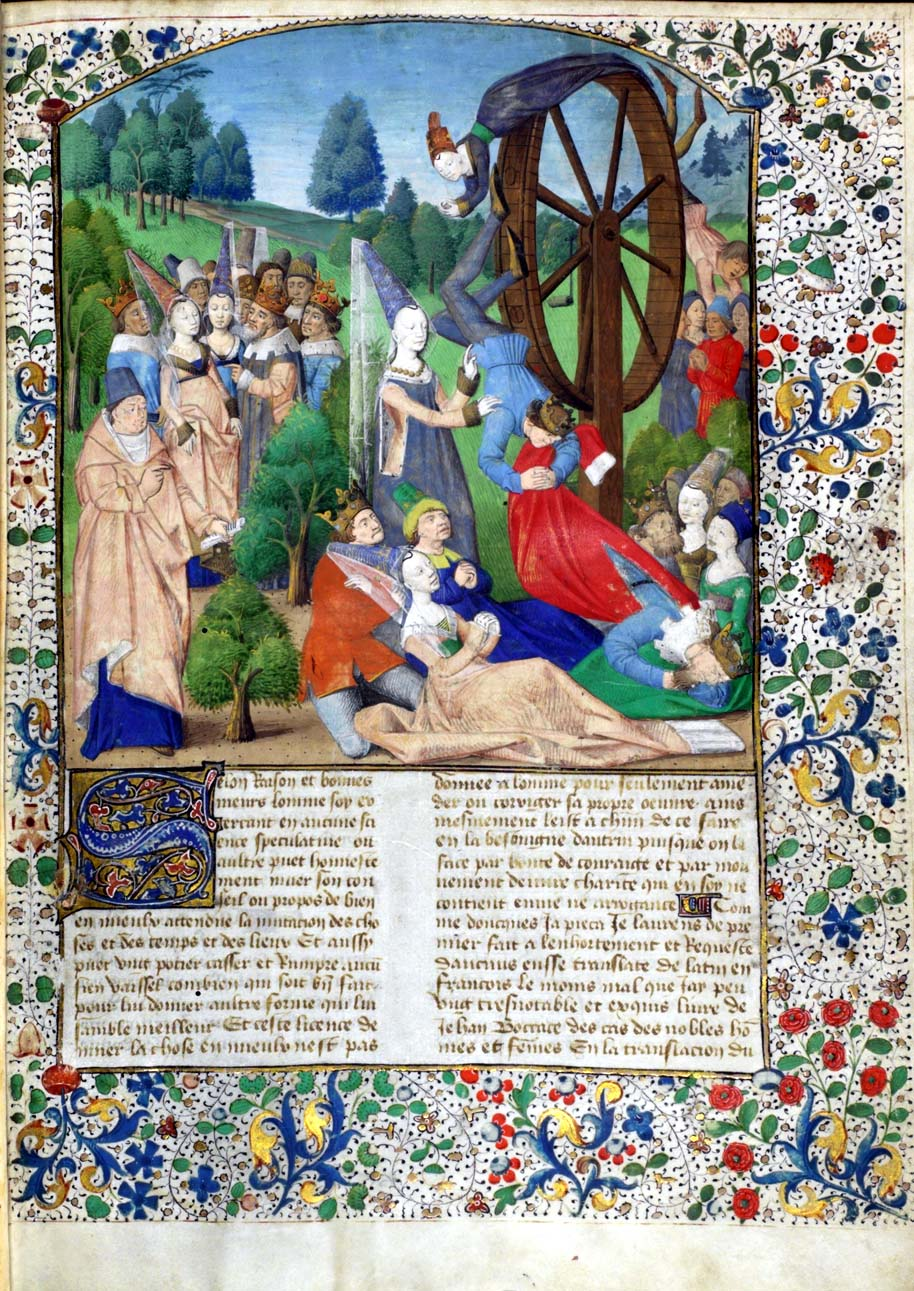
Lady Fortune with the Wheel of Fortune in a medieval manuscript of a work by Boccaccio

From the Carolingian epoch to the end of the Middle Ages and beyond, The Consolation of Philosophy was one of the most popular and influential philosophical works, read by statesmen, poets, historians, philosophers, and theologians. It is through Boethius that much of the thought of the Classical period was made available to the Western Medieval world. It has often been said Boethius was the "last of the Romans and the first of the Scholastics".

Translations into the vernacular were done by famous notables, including King Alfred (Old English), Jean de Meun (Old French), Geoffrey Chaucer (Middle English), Queen Elizabeth I (Early Modern English), Richard Graham, 1st Viscount Preston (English, 1695–1696), and Notker Labeo (Old High German). Other English translators include George Colville (1556), Henry Rosher (H. J.) James (1897), Walter John (W. J.) Sedgefield (1899), and Richard H. Green (1962). Boethius's Consolation of Philosophy was translated into Italian by Alberto della Piagentina (1332), Anselmo Tanso (Milan, 1520), Lodovico Domenichi (Florence, 1550), Benedetto Varchi (Florence, 1551), Cosimo Bartoli (Florence, 1551) and Tommaso Tamburini (Palermo, 1657).

Found within the Consolation are themes that have echoed throughout the Western canon: the female figure of wisdom that informs Dante, the ascent through the layered universe that is shared with Milton, the reconciliation of opposing forces that find their way into Chaucer in The Knight's Tale, and the Wheel of Fortune so popular throughout the Middle Ages.

Citations from it occur frequently in Dante's Divina Commedia. Of Boethius, Dante remarked: "The blessed soul who exposes the deceptive world to anyone who gives ear to him."

Boethian influence can be found nearly everywhere in Geoffrey Chaucer's poetry, e.g. in Troilus and Criseyde, The Knight's Tale, The Clerk's Tale, The Franklin's Tale, The Parson's Tale and The Tale of Melibee, in the character of Lady Nature in The Parliament of Fowls and some of the shorter poems, such as Truth, The Former Age and Lak of Stedfastnesse. Chaucer translated the work in his Boece.

The Italian composer Luigi Dallapiccola used some of the text in his choral work Canti di prigionia (1938). The Australian composer Peter Sculthorpe quoted parts of it in his opera or music theatre work Rites of Passage (1972–73), which was commissioned for the opening of the Sydney Opera House but was not ready in time.

Tom Shippey in The Road to Middle-earth says how "Boethian" much of the treatment of evil is in Tolkien's The Lord of the Rings. Shippey says that Tolkien knew well the translation of Boethius that was made by King Alfred and he quotes some "Boethian" remarks from Frodo, Treebeard, and Elrond.

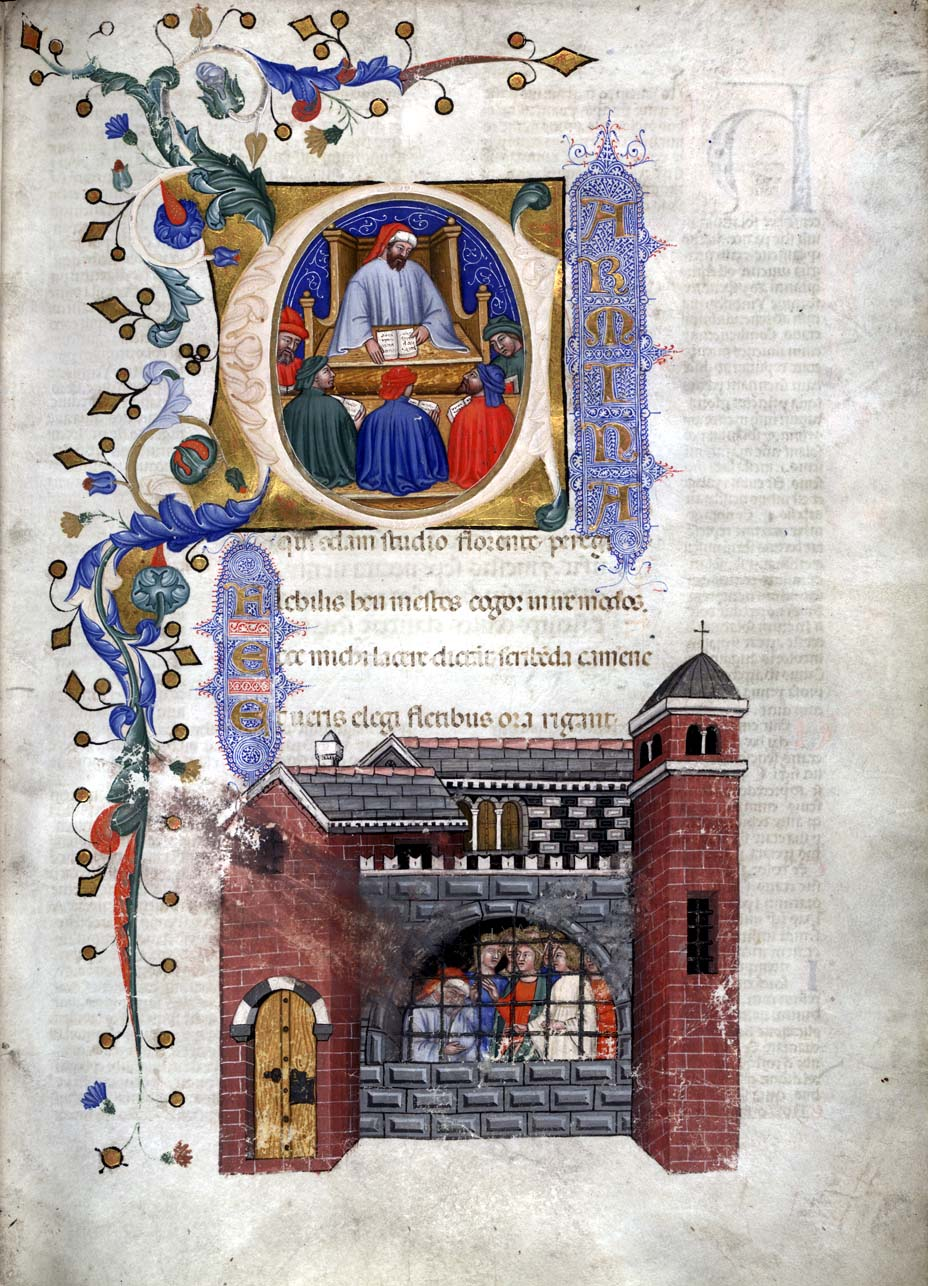
Miniatures of Boethius teaching and in prison from a 1385 Italian manuscript

Boethius and Consolatio Philosophiae are cited frequently by the main character Ignatius J. Reilly in the Pulitzer Prize-winning A Confederacy of Dunces (1980).

It is a prosimetrical text, meaning that it is written in alternating sections of prose and metered verse. In the course of the text, Boethius displays a virtuosic command of the forms of Latin poetry. It is classified as a Menippean satire, a fusion of allegorical tale, platonic dialogue, and lyrical poetry.

Edward Gibbon described the work as "a golden volume not unworthy of the leisure of Plato or Tully."

In the 20th century, there were close to four hundred manuscripts still surviving, a testament to its popularity.

Of the work, C. S. Lewis wrote: "To acquire a taste for it is almost to become naturalised in the Middle Ages."

German philosopher and sociologist Jürgen Habermas named the work as the book that changed his life, having read it during his school days.

In 2024, under the high patronage of the European Parliament, the Italian composer Mirco De Stefani published Cori di Boezio, for twelve male voices a cappella, on seven poems from De Consolatione Philosophiae, in the 15th centenary of the work.

=== Reconstruction of lost songs ===
Hundreds of Latin songs were recorded in neumes from the ninth century through to the thirteenth century, including settings of the poetic passages from Boethius's The Consolation of Philosophy. The music of this song repertory had long been considered irretrievably lost because the notational signs indicated only melodic outlines, relying on now-lapsed oral traditions to fill in the missing details. However, research conducted by Sam Barrett at the University of Cambridge, extended in collaboration with Medieval music ensemble Sequentia, has shown that principles of musical setting for this period can be identified, providing crucial information to enable modern realisations. Sequentia performed the world premiere of the reconstructed songs from Boethius's The Consolation of Philosophy at Pembroke College, Cambridge, in April 2016, bringing to life music not heard in over 1,000 years; a number of the songs were subsequently recorded on the CD Boethius: Songs of Consolation. Metra from 11th-Century Canterbury (Glossa, 2018). The detective story behind the recovery of these lost songs is told in a documentary film, and a website launched by the University of Cambridge in 2018 provides further details of the reconstruction process, bringing together manuscripts, reconstructions, and video resources.

== See also ==
- Allegory in the Middle Ages
- Consolatio
- Girdle book
- Metres of Boethius
- Prosimetrum
- Stoicism
- The Wheel of Fortune

== Editions ==
- Tr. Anonymous (London, James Flesher), 1664, Early English Books Online Collections.
- Tr. lover of truth and virtue (Oxford, H. Hall) 1674, Early English Books Online Collections.
- Tr. Richard Graham, 1st Viscount Preston, (London, J.D.) 1695, Early English Books Online Collections.
- Tr. Philip Ridpath (London) 1785 Internet Archive.
- Tr. Henry Rosher James, (London, Elliot Stock) 1897, Internet Archive.
- Tr. Walter John Sedgefield (Oxford), 1899, 1900, Internet Archive.
- Tr. Wilbraham Villiers (W. V.) Cooper (Carlton House, NY & Aldine House London) 1902, Internet Archive.
- Tr. Edward Kennard Rand (R. & R. Clark, Limited) 1918, 1953, Loeb Classical Library, Internet Archive.
- Tr. Richard H. Green, (Library of the Liberal Arts), 1962. ISBN 0-02-346450-X
- Tr. Victor Watts, (Penguin Classics), 2000. ISBN 0-14-044780-6
- Tr. Joel C. Relihan, (Hackett Publishing), 2001. ISBN 0-87220-583-5
- Tr. P. G. Walsh, (Oxford World's Classics), 2001. ISBN 0-19-283883-0
- Claudio Moreschini (ed.) (2005). Boethius: De consolatione philosophiae, opuscula theologica. 2nd edition. Munich: Saur, ISBN 3-598-71278-2.
- Joachim Gruber (ed.) (2020). Anicius Manlius Severinus Boethius: Philosophiae Consolatio. Trost der Philosophie. Lateinisch/Deutsch. Stuttgart: Hiersemann, ISBN 978-3-7772-2027-7.

== Bibliography ==
- Blackwood, Stephen (2015). The Consolation of Boethius as Poetic Liturgy. Oxford Early Christian Studies. Oxford University Press. ISBN 9780198718314.
- Henry Chadwick, Boethius: The Consolations of Music, Logic, Theology and Philosophy, 1990, ISBN 0-19-826549-2
- Herbermann, Charles, ed. (1913). "Anicius Manlius Severinus Boethius" . Catholic Encyclopedia. New York: Robert Appleton Company..
- Gruber, Joachim (2006). Kommentar zu Boethius, De consolatione philosophiae [Commentary on Boethius, On the Consolation of Philosophy]. 2nd edition. Berlin/New York: De Gruyter, ISBN 978-3-11-017740-4.
- Lewis, C.S. (1964), The Discarded Image: An Introduction to Medieval and Renaissance Literature, Cambridge University Press, ISBN 0-521-47735-2.
- Regen, Frank (2001). Praescientia. Vorauswissen Gottes und Willensfreiheit des Menschen in der Consolatio Philosophiae des Boethius [Praescientia. The Foreknowledge of God and the Free Will of Man in Boethius’ Consolatio Philosophiae]. Göttingen: Duehrkohp & Radicke, ISBN 3-89744-163-2.
- Relihan, Joel C., The Prisoner's Philosophy: Life and Death in Boethius's Consolation, 2007, ISBN 978-0872205833.
- Sanderson Beck, The Consolation of Boethius an analysis and commentary. 1996.
- Wiitala, Michael (ed.) (2024). Boethius’ Consolation of Philosophy. A Critical Guide. Cambridge: Cambridge University Press, ISBN 978-1-00-928822-4.
