= Thierry of Chartres =

12th-century French philosopher

Thierry of Chartres (Theodoricus Chartrensis) or Theodoric the Breton (Theodericus Brito) (died before 1155, probably 1150) was a twelfth-century philosopher working at Chartres and Paris, France.

The cathedral school at Chartres promoted scholarship before the first university was founded in France. Thierry was a major figure in twelfth-century philosophy and learning, and, like many twelfth-century scholars, is notable for his embrace of Plato's Timaeus and his application of philosophy to theological issues. Some modern scholars believed Thierry to have been a brother of Bernard of Chartres who had founded the school of Chartres, but later research has shown that this is unlikely.

Thierry became chancellor of Chartres after his predecessor, Gilbert of Poitiers, returned to his native city in 1141. John of Salisbury, Herman of Carinthia, and Clarembald of Arras were among Thierry's students.

== Works ==
=== Hexaemeron ===
The Hexaemeron interprets the Genesis with reference to Plato's "Timaeus". The text serves as a reasoned defense of God's existence, by relying on Platonic natural philosophy and Aristotelian logic to explain the creation of the world. Thierry establishes that the moment of divine creation was the very beginning of time, and following that, creation evolved naturally through combinations of the four elements (fire, air, water, and earth). According to Thierry, God created the four elements in the first moment. Fire, which is constantly moving, rotated and lit up the air, causing the first night and day. On the second day, fire warmed the water, causing it to rise into the heavens and form clouds. Because of the reduction of water, land emerged on the third day. The continued heating of the waters above the firmament caused the water to create the heavenly bodies on the fourth day. The continued warming of land caused the plant, animal, and human life to arise on the fifth and sixth days.

Thierry's explanation of the creation of the world is based on a theological interpretation of Aristotle's four causes, which he identifies with the three persons of the Trinity plus matter (made up of the four elements): the Father is the efficient cause, the Son is the formal cause, the Holy Spirit is the final cause and the four elements are the material cause.

According to Thierry, the act of divine creation is limited to the creation of the four elements, which then evolve by themselves, mix according to mathematical proportions and make up the physical world.

=== Heptateuch ===
The Heptateuch is a broad encyclopedia of information relating to the liberal arts, all within the context of academic and theologic unity. It particularly examines the ways in which different types of knowledge can be distinguished, while still supporting a single purpose: explaining order in reality. The trivium (logic, grammar, and rhetoric) address the veracity, consistency, and beauty of the language of expression. The quadrivium (geometry, astronomy, arithmetic, and music) provide the intellectual content in need of expression.

Thierry also wrote some commentaries on Boethius' De Trinitate.

== Editions ==
- Commentaries on Boethius by Thierry of Chartres and His School, ed. N. M. Häring, Toronto 1971.
- The Latin Rhetorical Commentaries by Thierry of Chartres, ed. K. M. Fredborg, Toronto 1988.
- The Commentary on the De arithmetica of Boethius, ed. I. Caiazzo, Turnhout 2015.

== See also ==
- Renaissance of the 12th century
