= The Tale of Melibee =

Part of the Canterbury Tales

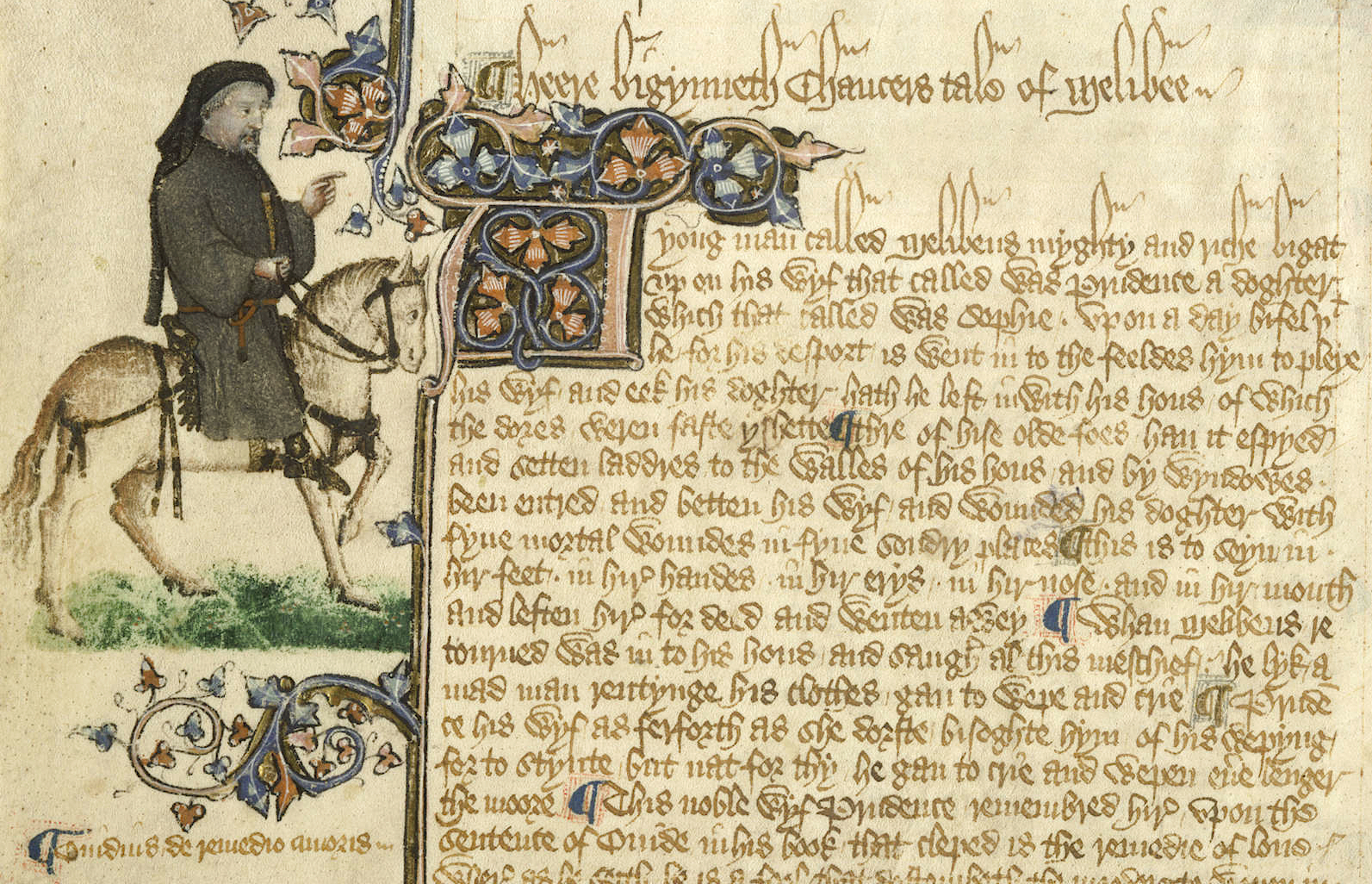
Geoffrey Chaucer, Tale of Melibee, Ellesmere Chaucer, mssEL 26 C 9, folio 153v

"The Tale of Melibee" (also called "The Tale of Melibeus") is one of The Canterbury Tales by Geoffrey Chaucer.

This is the second tale in the collection told by Chaucer himself. After being interrupted by the host Harry Bailly and reprimanded for the poor quality of his first story, Sir Thopas, which was compared to a turd, Chaucer launches into one of the longest and some would say most boring of all the tales. Complaining of Sir Thopas's lewedness, Bailly requests a prose tale with doctryne. In response, Chaucer tells "The Tale of Melibee", which is exactly that. Bailly, seemingly pleased with this tale, says he wishes his wife had heard it as she might learn something from Dame Prudence.

The tale's length has resulted in its omission in some modern English editions, such as Nevill Coghill's translation.

== Plot ==
The story concerns Melibee who is away one day when three enemies break into his house, beat his wife Dame Prudence, and attack his daughter, leaving her for dead. The tale then proceeds as a long debate mainly between Melibee and his wife on what actions to take and how to seek redress from his enemies. His wife, as her name suggests, counsels prudence and chides him for his rash opinions. The discussion uses many proverbs and quotations from learned authorities and the Bible as each make their points.

== Sources ==
The tale is a translation of the Livre de Melibée et de Dame Prudence by Renaud de Louens. Renaud's work itself is a very loose translation of Liber consolationis et consilii by Albertanus of Brescia. Chaucer used Brescia's Liber de doctrina dicendi et tacendi (Book of Speaking and Keeping Silent) as a source for the Manciple's Tale, and his De amore dei (On the Love of God) for the Merchant's Tale. Albertanus himself sourced many of his anecdotes and proverbs from the Solomonic books of the Bible, Seneca, Cicero, and others.

== Style ==
Melibee is a long tale, light on plot and told in "workman-like prose". As such, it has been largely ignored by critics and has a reputation for being boring.

Melibee, and Thopas before it, form a self-referential joke; Chaucer was already a well-known poet by the time he wrote The Canterbury Tales, but Chaucer-the-character's two submissions to Harry Bailly's contest are a doggerel poem and an inelegant prose tale, neither of which seem appropriate for a poet of Chaucer's skill and renown. Chaucer uses similar self-deprecating humour in House of Fame.

== Themes ==
The tale is a serious and philosophical take on "civic violence and its management", which would have had particular importance for Chaucer and his audience, given the deadly political turmoil of London in the late fourteenth century.

== See also ==
- Wisdom literature
