= Claudio Moreschini =

Italian academic

Claudio Moreschini (born c.1938?) is an Italian academic. His expertize was in classical philology, platonism and patristics, often approaching early Christian authors from a literary perspective. After initial studies at the University of Pisa and at the Scuola Normale Superiore in the same city, Moreschini studied at the University of Oxford, notably with E. R.Dodds and Eduard Fraenkel.

From 1966 onwards, he occupied a succession of posts in the University of Pisa, particularly as professore ordinario di Letteratura Latina, professore ordinario di Letturatura Cristiana Antica, and as head of department. He has worked with the Istituto di Scienze Religiose at Trent and latterly at the Istituto Patristico Augustinianum in Rome.

His publications include an Italian translation of Thucydides, two dialogues of Plato for the Budé series, two Ciceronian dialogues, Apuleius, Consolatio Philosophiae in the Leipzig Teubner series, Tertullian Cyprian, Jerome in Corpus Christianorum of Turnhout. Moreschini is a major contributor to Sources Chrétiennes. He has also published items concerning Jamblichus and Maximus the Confessor.

Moreschini is interested in the reception of antiquity, not least Plato, at the Renaissance and in nineteenth century Italy (Leopardi). In 2009 he was recipient of the Marcello Gigante Prize.

== Selected publications ==
- Early Christian Greek and Latin literature. with Enrico Norelli. Hendrickson Publishers Inc. 2005 (Italian original: Morcelliana 1995)
- Storia della filosofia patristica. Morcelliana, Brescia, 2004.
- A Christian in Toga. Boethius: Interpreter of Antiquity and Christian Theology. Vandenhoeck & Ruprecht (BERG Bd. 003), 2014.

=== Contributions to Sources Chrétiennes ===
- Cyprien, A Donat et la vertu de patience. SC 291, 1982.
- Grégoire de Nazianze, Discours 32-37. SC 318, 1985.
- Grégoire de Nazianze, Discours 38-41. SC 358, 1990.
- Tertullien, Exhortation à la charité. SC 319, 1985.
- Tertullien, Contre Marcion, tome IV. SC 456, 2000.
- Tertullien, Contre Marcion, tome V. SC 483, 2004.

== Sources ==
- Università di Pisa/Ateneo 2 March 2010
- Sources Chrétiennes, Editions Le Cerf
- Teubner
- Vandenhoeck & Ruprecht
- Morcelliana

Italian Wikiquote has quotations related to: Claudio Moreschini
