= Chaucer's Retraction =

Part of the Canterbury Tales

Chaucer's Retraction (Harleian manuscript)

Now pray I to yow alle that heren this litel tretis or reden it, that if ther be any thing in it that likes hem, that therof thay thanke oure Lord Jhesu Crist, of whom procedith alle witte and al goodnes; and if ther be eny thing that displesith hem, I pray hem that thay arette it to the defaute of myn unconnyng, and not to my wille, that wolde fayn have sayd better if I hadde connyng; for the book saith, al that is writen for oure doctrine is writen. Wherfore I biseke yow mekely for the mercy of God that ye pray for me, that God have mercy on me and forgeve me my giltes, and nameliche my translaciouns and of endityng in worldly vanitees, whiche I revoke in my retracciouns, as is the book of Troyles, the book also of Fame, the book of twenty-five Ladies, the book of the Duchesses, the book of seint Valentines day and of the Parliment of briddes, the Tales of Caunturbury, alle thilke that sounen into synne, the book of the Leo, and many other bokes, if thay were in my mynde or remembraunce, and many a song and many a leccherous lay, of the whiche Crist for his grete mercy forgive me the synnes. But of the translacioun of Boce de consolacioun, and other bokes of consolacioun and of legend of lyves of seints, and Omelies, and moralitees, and devocioun, that thanke I oure Lord Jhesu Crist, and his moder, and alle the seintes in heven, bisekyng hem that thay fro hennysforth unto my lyves ende sende me grace to biwayle my gultes, and to studien to the savacioun of my soule, and graunte me grace and space of verray repentaunce, penitence, confessioun, and satisfaccioun, to don in this present lif, thurgh the benigne grace of him, that is king of kynges and prest of alle prestis, that bought us with his precious blood of his hert, so that I moote be oon of hem at the day of doom that schal be saved; qui cum Patre et Spiritu sancto vivis et regnas Deus per omnia secula [who with the Father and Holy Spirit lives and reigns as God for ever]. Amen.

"Chaucer's Retraction" is the final section of The Canterbury Tales. It is written as an apology, in which Geoffrey Chaucer asks for forgiveness for the vulgar and unworthy parts of his past works, and seeks absolution for his sins.

It is not clear whether this declaration of remorse on Chaucer's part was intended as sincere or ironic. It is not even certain if the retraction was an integral part of the Canterbury Tales or if it was the equivalent of a deathbed confession which later was attached to the Canterbury Tales, his most popular work. It appears in many of the best manuscripts dating from just a decade or two after Chaucer's death, including the Harleian and Ellesmere; however, it is absent from the Hengwrt manuscript.

Roper (2000) postulates that the Retraction is Chaucer's authentic confession, an "opportunity [...] to learn the lesson he taught others in the Parson's Tale." The narrative voice, at first indistinguishable from the Parson's own (he refers to "this little treatise," a term more applicable to the Parson's Tale than to the Canterbury Tales as a whole), changes to Chaucer's own voice as he begins to apologize for his lack of literary skill (his "uncunning"); but then changes again to an apology for his "inditing of worldly vanities" in fiction. Roper writes: "The speech itself has driven him to a deeper understanding of his failings, creating greater shame, contrition, and a more significant self-examination. [...F]ar from simply running from his fiction in a hasty and belated attempt to save his soul, he uses the Parson's Tale and Retraction to question the very act of fiction-making[.]"

The Retraction refers to Chaucer's "Book of the Lion." It is the only place Chaucer himself mentions this otherwise unknown work, though it is also mentioned in the prologue to Lydgate's The Fall of Princes. This "Book of the Lion" is usually supposed to have been a redaction of Guillaume de Machaut's Dit du Lyon (1342).
