= The Cook's Tale =

Part of the Canterbury Tales

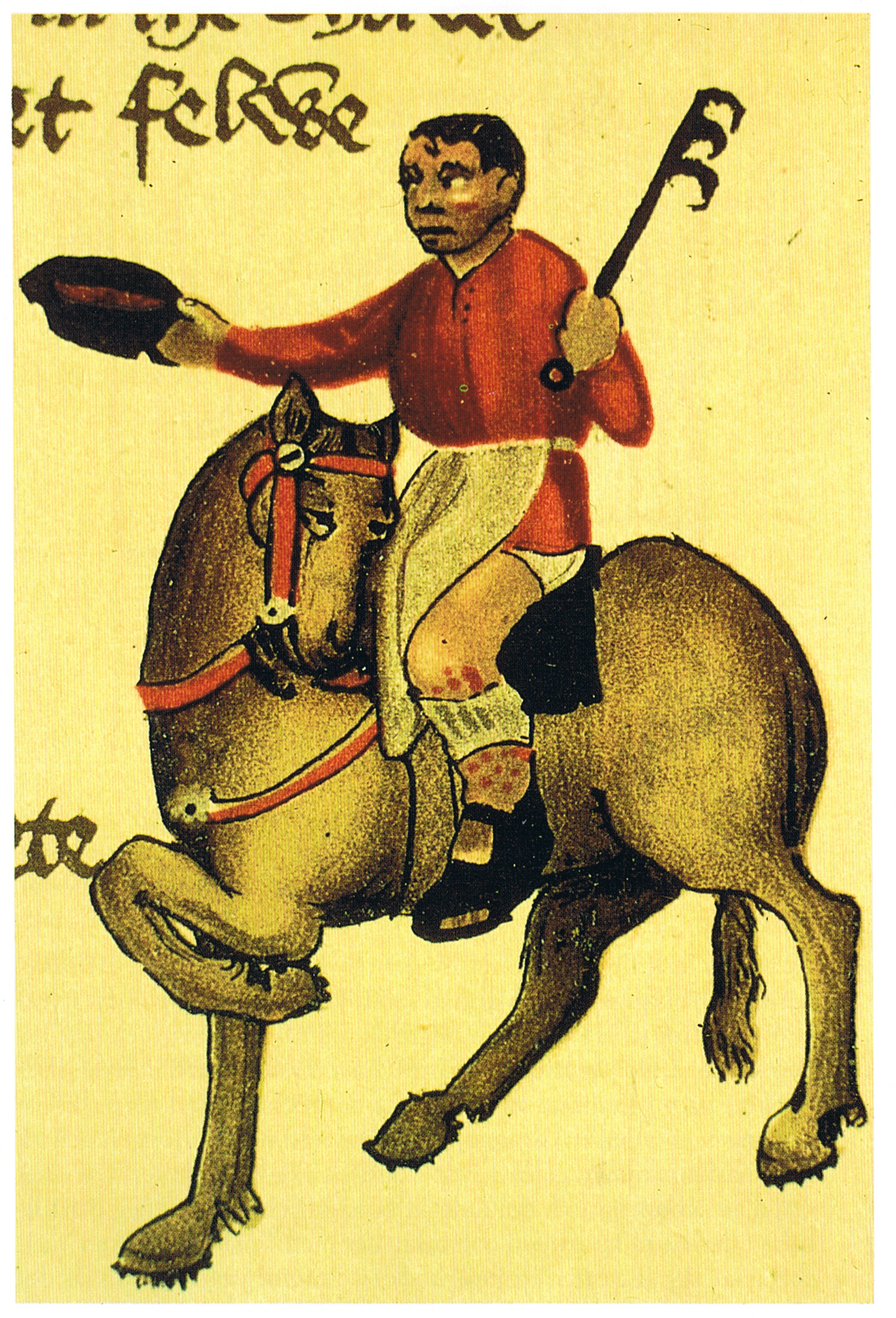
"The Cook" from The Canterbury Tales

"The Cook's Tale" is one of the Canterbury Tales by Geoffrey Chaucer. It breaks off after 58 lines and was presumably never finished, although some scholars argue that Chaucer deliberately left the tale unfinished.

== Prologue ==
The Cook (Roger) starts by commenting on the Reeve's tale and then, after a reference to Solomon, asks for his listeners to attend while he tells of a trick that was played in his city (Lines 1 – 19). (Note: A possible reference to a miller who had a trick played on him could possibly indicate that "The Cook's Prologue" was originally intended to have come after "The Miller's Tale" but that the material was reused in "The Reeve's Tale"?) The host then invites the cook to tell his tale (Lines 20 – 40). (Note: Both the host and the Cook make nasty jokes about each other – the host on how badly the cook prepares food for the unwary, and the Cook replies he'll tell a tale of an innkeeper.)

== Plot ==
The story starts telling of an apprentice named Perkyn (a.k.a. Perkin) who is fond of drinking and dancing. Perkyn is released by his master and moves in with a friend who also loves to drink, and whose wife is a shopkeeper whose real occupation is that of a prostitute.

After the tale, The Host later calls upon the Cook for another, but he is too drunk and, after he falls from his horse and is helped back up, the Man of Law tells a tale.

== Analysis ==
The tale continues the general downward trend of the preceding tales—the Knight's, the Miller's and the Reeve's tale—into ever-more-seedy stories. Its length makes finding a source impossible, but it is thought by some scholars to be a retelling of contemporary events, with a Roger Knight de Ware being mentioned in several manuscripts of the time.

In 25 of The Canterbury Tales MSS (notably Harley MS 7334 and Corpus Christi 198) the Cook's unfinished tale is followed by the anonymous Tale of Gamelyn, and it has been suggested that Chaucer intended to rewrite the tale for the Cook. There is, however, no other connection of Gamelyn with Chaucer and the great difference in tone between that tale and the one the Cook starts suggests that it was inserted by the scribes who copied the manuscripts. Walter Skeat argued instead that Chaucer intended the tale for the Yeoman, who would presumably be more interested in a tale of country life.

== Adaptations ==
Pasolini adapted this story in his film The Canterbury Tales. He greatly expanded on the story which is very short at only 58 lines. Ninetto Davoli stars as Perkin. The story includes a lot of slapstick humor and homages the films of Charlie Chaplin.

== Influences ==
A renowned chef, Dev Biswal, renamed his Canterbury restaurant from 'The Ambrette' to 'Cook's Tale', in a tribute to the Chaucerian character. The tasting menu features such medieval delights as "Ypocras, fortified Kentish wine served with cake; Wastel breed with flavoured beef drippings; Pyk in Brasey; Pigeon with wortes and marybones; Salat of Sawge with Chybollus, Pesen Pottage; Mushroom bake with fecces; Tamworth pork mortreux, Venysoun with roasted chasteynes and Walsh-notes; and poached peres; and Chese."
