= Bridgewater Library =

- Location: Tatton Park, Cheshire, England, United Kingdom
- Type: Private
- Established: mid to late 1500s
- Dissolved: c. 1917

The Bridgewater Library was a family library, "the oldest large family collection in England to survive intact into modern times".

The library was begun by Thomas Egerton, 1st Viscount Brackley at Tatton Park in Cheshire, and added to by his son John Egerton, 1st Earl of Bridgewater. John Egerton, 2nd Earl of Bridgewater also added to the library, and is said to have compiled a manuscript catalogue to it. Although John Egerton, 3rd Earl of Bridgewater "made some additions to the library ... the great period of its growth were now over". Most of the library was sold by John Egerton, 4th Earl of Ellesmere to Henry E. Huntington in 1917 and now "forms the core of the Elizabethan and early Stuart collection at the Huntington Library.

== See also ==
- Ellesmere Chaucer
