= The Tale of Gamelyn =

Middle English romance (c. 1350)

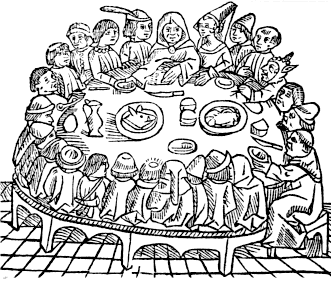
A woodcut from William Caxton's second edition of The Canterbury Tales printed in 1483

The Tale of Gamelyn is a romance written in c. 1350 in a dialect of Middle English, considered part of the Matter of England. It is presented in a style of rhymed couplets and described by Skeat as "the older and longer kind of ballad" and by Ramsey as a "rough and ready romance".

This 900-line romance is set during the reign of King Edward I and tells the story of Gamelyn, and the various obstacles he must overcome in order to retrieve his rightful inheritance from his older brother. The tale confronts the corruption of the law, illuminating a lack of moral and political consistency. There is no indication as to where exactly this story takes place, given that the text itself has no place names, and Gamelyn's family name of Boundys most likely just signifies a type of boundary.

Although The Tale of Gamelyn is included among Geoffrey Chaucer's Canterbury Tales in two early manuscripts, where it follows the unfinished Cook's Tale, modern scholars do not consider this to be written by Chaucer, although it is possible that he had included the character of Gamelyn among his papers, with the intention of rewriting it for a suitable character. He may perhaps have wanted to construct a version of it for use as the Cook's tale. Skeat argued instead that Chaucer intended the tale for the Yeoman, who would presumably be more interested in a tale of country life.

The Tale of Gamelyn shares similarities with other stories from English literary and folk traditions. It is of particular interest for its similarities with the English ballad of the legendary outlaw Robin Hood. It was also a source for Thomas Lodge's prose romance Rosalynde (1590), on which William Shakespeare based his As You Like It. The Tale of Gamelyn is thought to provide a transition between the mid 14th century and the late 15th century world of early romances and Robin Hood ballads.

== Plot ==
The Tale of Gamelyn is the story of a younger son, left at his father's death in the care of a wicked elder brother, who seeks to cheat him out of his inheritance. The tale opens with the old knight Sir Johan of Boundys on his death-bed. He knows his end is near, and he has called his neighbours so that in their presence, he may divide his lands among his three sons. He knows that his neighbours will try to cheat the young Gamelyn of his share, but the old man is determined to have his own way:

'Then seyde the knight I sware by Seynt Martin,
For al that ye have y-doon yit is the land myn.'

With his last words he divides all his lands; five ploughlands to the eldest son, five more to the second, and all that remains will go to Gamelyn. The neighbours leave, Sir Johan dies, and Gamelyn is left at the mercy of his eldest brother. Gamelyn grows up in his brother's hall, and while his lands were held in ward by his brother, they were wasted and have gone to ruin. He grows up tall and strong, and as he stands in his brother's yard one day, he begins to think of his wasted lands, and he becomes determined to claim his inheritance. He seeks out his brother, and there begins their long and furious quarrel. They argue over his inheritance, then the elder brother calls his men to bind and beat the boy, however Gamelyn attacks them with a pestle then shuts himself in the hay loft. There he threatened to break every bone in the body of any who came near him, unless his brother will give him back his land. Realizing he is beaten for the moment, the brother in his cunning tells Gamelyn he only wished to try his strength, and if he would live with him he would have his land, his kiss of peace, and more:

'Thy land, that lyth laye, full wel it schal be sowe,
And thyn houses reysed up, that ben layd so lowe'

So Gamelyn has his peace and his land, and for the moment they live happily together. Soon after a wrestling was cried in the country, and 'there was set up a ram and a ryng', the traditional prize for the man that could overthrow the champion. Gamelyn makes a decision to try his luck, and as he tells his brother, it will bring great worship to the family if he can return with the trophies. Gamelyn sets off, but as he nears the spot, he meets a poor franklin weeping, who tells him that the wrestling champion has slain his two sons. Gamelyn makes a promise to avenge him, so he leaves his horse and his shirt with the franklin and hurries to the ring. He easily beats the champion and is presented with the ram and the ring 'for the best wrasteler that ever here came'. He thanks the wardens for his prize, then proceeds to invite all at the fair to accompany him home to celebrate his triumph in the hall. Gamelyn had not reckoned on his brother's reactions, he had hoped that a broken neck would solve the family problems, and he has no intention of entertaining the mob at his home. When he sees the 'rowte' in the distance he tells his porter to bar the gate and to let no man pass. Gamelyn kicks down the door, breaks the fleeing porter's neck, and throws his lifeless body into the well in the courtyard. He then goes to the gate and opens in wide:

'He let in alle maner men that goon in wold or ryd,
And seyde 'Ye be welcome, withouten eny greeve,
For wee will be maistres here and aske no man leeve'

Five tuns of wine are broached, and Gamelyn swore that none should leave while a drop was left. The feast lasted seven days and nights, and at the end, Gamelyn farewells his guests and proceeds to fetch his brother who had taken refuge in the cellar. The brother tells Gamelyn that he will make him his heir, but to avenge the death of his porter, and to preserve his honour, he asks that Gamelyn allow himself to be bound hand and foot. Gamelyn naively agrees and is therefore fettered to a post in the dining-hall where he stands without food, for all to mock. He turns to Adam the Spencer, who makes a promise to bring him food and loosen his bonds. Adam had been his father's man, and he has more to add to the plan. He tells Gamelyn that his brother has arranged a feast for the next Sunday; all the great churchmen will be there, but before they come, Adam has promised to unlock Gamelyn's fetters. In the middle of the meal it is planned that the churchmen should speak to Gamelyn's brother on his behalf; in which case, Gamelyn would be free and no suspicion need fall on Adam. But if they would not, then Gamelyn should, when Adam gave the sign, throw away his fetters, and then:

'Thow schalt have a good staff and I wil have another,
And Cristes curs have that oon that faileth that other.'

When the day arrived, the abbots and Gamelyn's brother sat at meat; Gamelyn stood tethered at the end of the hall; his brother told them he was mad, and to his appeals they replied with solemn curses. Meanwhile, Adam had fetched two staves and brought them to the door; suddenly the prisoner threw aside his fetters, and the guests found themselves facing two angry men armed with clubs. There was no one to help them; Gamelyn had always been the champion of the servants, and they had no intention of helping an oppressive master and his associates, even though they were churchmen. Gamelyn and Adam attacked the guests and not a man escaped unhurt:

'Thider they came rydyng jolily with swaynes,
But home agen they were y-lad in cartes and waynes.'

With one blow Gamelyn felled his brother, then set him in his own fetters to 'cool his blood', while the servants brought him all the best fare in the house. While Gamelyn was celebrating his release, word had been sent to the sheriff of the affair, and four-and-twenty men had formed a posse to capture the offenders. Gamelyn was informed of their coming by his new porter who ran in with the news that there were foemen at the gate. He and Adam drove away the first group, but soon they saw a great rout coming with the sheriff at their head, it was time to leave. While the sheriff was searching the house and attending to Gamelyn's brother, the two fugitives were running through the woods. In the forest they came upon a group of outlaws, and as they peered under the branches of a tree, they saw the 'master outlaw'. At first the outlaws took them for the law's spies, and seven men brought them before their 'king'. Gamelyn assured him that they were also on the run, so he made them join with his men at their meal. The master outlaw enrolled them in his band, and before long Gamelyn was made master under him. They were with the outlaws for less than three weeks when the news came that their master's friend had a pardon for him from the king. He took his leave and returned to his land, and Gamelyn was crowned King of the outlaws in his place. Meanwhile, his outlawry was made public; his brother was healed of his broken back, and for the new term he himself was made sheriff. Gamelyn's lands were seized, and in accordance with law, his peasants paid fine to the sheriff, as they would to a new lord when the old died, for to the law, Gamelyn was now dead. However, he was a lord they loved, and the new master was harsh; so his bondmen kept their loyalty to him and he was informed of how things stood with him and his land. Gamelyn regretted that he had not killed his brother, and the welfare of his peasants and their wives he could not overlook. He swore that he would be at the next shire court to uphold their cause, and he was as good as his word. Gamelyn went to the shire court alone, and as an outlaw he had no right at law (it is clear that the author of this poem knew the law quite well): when he walked into the 'moot hall', he had put himself in the sheriff's power. He had no right to speak in his own defence, he was allowed no chance to; he was bound and fettered and cast into the sheriff's prison to await the assize. Although he was in the sheriff's power, he still had some use of the law; he had another brother, Sir Ote, the 'myddeleste' of Sir John's sons, and he received word of Gamelyn's imprisonment. Ote was as honourable as his elder brother was treacherous; as soon as he heard the news he saddled his horse and rode to the sheriff. The elder brother was deaf to his pleas for family feeling, but he could not refuse to bail Gamelyn if his brother stood surety for him. Gamelyn was released, and returned to Sir Ote's house with him. As he was still King of the outlaws, he planned to return to the forest to see how things stood with them:

'To see how my younge men leden her lyf
Whether they lyven in joie or elles in stryf.'

Ote tried to dissuade him; he was afraid that once with his men in the forest, Gamelyn would not return, and as his mainpernor he himself would be bound and tried in his place. Gamelyn swore that he would be back on the day of the assize, and so he sets off and finds 'his mery men under woode bough'. He stays in the forest until the day of the assize, adding to his list of charges by the plunder of any rich churchmen who pass his way. In the meantime his elder brother set about packing the jury with one or more bribed men to hang Gamelyn:

'The fals knight his brother forgat he nat that,
To hyre the men on his quest to hangen his brother;
Though he hadde nought that oon he wolde have that other.'

The day of the assize arrived; the lords of the county came to the 'moot hall', the King's justice was sitting, and Sir Ote was taken and brought to court in fetters. The case was dealt with briefly; the jury delivered their verdict, and the judge of assize gave his sentence that Sir Ote should hang as an outlaw. Gamelyn had not failed his brother; when the verdict was delivered, Adam the Spencer was at the back of the court, and all the outlaws were outside waiting for his report on the proceedings. Adam slipped out and told Gamelyn, who stationed his men at the door, then he himself strode into the hall, for as he said, he would that day be justice himself. No one moved as he went in, as they could see the outlaws outside. Gamelyn loosed his brother, then crossed to the justice's seat:

'The justice sat still, and roose not anoon;
And Gamelyn clevede his cheeke boon;
Gamelyn took him in the arm, and no more spake,
But threw him over the barre, and his arm to-brak.'

Gamelyn then took the justice's seat, and put Sir Ote beside him; his men entered, and bound the justice and the sheriff. Next, the jury that had judged Sir Ote were bound and fettered as well. A jury was quickly assembled from among the outlaws, and a verdict and sentence hastily delivered, and put to immediate execution:

'The justice and the scherreve both hanged hye,
To weyven with ropes and with the wynd drye;
And the twelve sisours, sorwe have that rekke!
Alle they were hanged faste by the nekke.'

The tables were turned, the outlaws had sat in judgment on the law itself, and right had won. The story now ends quickly; Gamelyn and Ote get safe conduct to the King, and they obtain his pardon. Sir Ote is made his justice, and Gamelyn is made Chief Justice of the Forest. The other outlaws are pardoned and Gamelyn gets back his land and his people. He and Sir Ote return home, to live and die in prosperity. The poem ends with the following moral words:

'They liveden togidere whil that Crist wolde,
And sithen was Gamelyn graven under molde.
And so schal we al, may ther no man fle,
God bryng us to the joye that ever schal be.'

== Characters ==
- Sir Johan of Boundys: father of Gamelyn, Ote and an unnamed eldest son. His death in the beginning of the tale incites conflict of the ownership of his estate.
- The Three Knights: the men Sir Johan of Boundys trusts to divide out his land justly between his three sons. However, they go against his wishes and give land to the two eldest sons, excluding Gamelyn.
- Gamelyn: the youngest son of Sir Johan of Boundys, the protagonist. The name Gamelyn is held to mean son of the old man, from OE gamol, old man. According to line 356 Gamelyn has been oppressed by his brother for sixteen years before he comes to manhood.
- The eldest brother: the lord of the estate who later becomes the sheriff. The antagonist.
- Ote: the middle son and a knight; helps Gamelyn gain his rightful inheritance.
- Adam Spencer: servant in the household who helps Gamelyn escape and joins the outlaw band with him.
- King Edward: pardons Gamelyn and his friends at the end of the tale, allowing Gamelyn and his brother Ote to live out the rest of their lives in peace.

== Arguments ==
It is argued that The Tale of Gamelyn was not, in fact, composed by Chaucer. Instead, it is thought to be merely a setup for future works. Though Chaucer wrote the Canterbury Tales and The Tale of Gamelyn is supposed to be included, it is considered an anonymous work.

In addition, The Tale of Gamelyn is included in two early manuscript versions of the Tales, British Library, MS Harley 7334 and Oxford, Corpus Christi College, MS 198, both once notorious for being one of the lower-quality early manuscripts in terms of editor error and alteration. It is now widely rejected by scholars as an authentic Chaucerian tale, although some scholars think he may have intended to rewrite the story as a tale for the Yeoman.

Skeat edited the poem separately in 1884 and included it in an appendix to his The Complete Works of Geoffrey Chaucer, relying on what he thought was the best manuscript.

Chaucer may have intended it to form the basis of his (unfinished) "Cook's Tale" in The Canterbury Tales.

== Quotes ==
- "But may they always prosper, who cause you much grief" (478).
- "All who give you security, may evil befall them" (481). This is the reverse of the prior quote.
- "For I am as light of foot as you, even if you swore it to the contrary".
- "If you brought five with you, you would be twelve" (647). They are foolishly mocking numbers.
- "I will venture so I might have food" (661). Adam is being ironic since this is an understatement to the scene.
- "Hearken and listen and hold your tongue, And you shall hear talking of Gamelyn the Young".
