= The Canterbury Tales =

Story collection by Geoffrey Chaucer

- A woodcut from Richard Pynson's 1491/1492 edition of The Canterbury Tales
- Author: Geoffrey Chaucer
- Original title: Tales of Caunterbury
- Translator: Percy MacKaye
- Language: Middle English
- Set in: England, 14th century
- Publication date: c. 1400 (unfinished at Chaucer's death)
- Publication place: England
- Media type: Manuscript
- Dewey Decimal: 821.1
- LC Class: PR1870 .A1
- Original text: Tales of Caunterbury at Middle English Wikisource
- Translation: The Canterbury Tales at Wikisource

The Canterbury Tales (Middle English: Tales of Caunterbury) (Note: The name "Tales of Caunterbury" appears within the surviving texts of Chaucer's work. Its modern name first appeared as Canterbury talys in John Lydgate's 1421–1422 prologue to the Siege of Thebes.) is an anthology of twenty-four short stories written in Middle English by Geoffrey Chaucer between 1387 and 1400. They are mostly in verse, and are presented as part of a fictional storytelling contest held by a group of pilgrims travelling from London to Canterbury in order to visit the shrine of Saint Thomas Becket at Canterbury Cathedral.

The Canterbury Tales are widely regarded as Chaucer's magnum opus, and they are revered as one of the paramount works of English literature. The Tales had a major effect upon the development of English literature itself. They may have been responsible for the popularisation of the English vernacular in mainstream English literature, as opposed to French or Latin.

Most scholars think the Tales were incomplete at the end of Chaucer's life. In the General Prologue, some 30 pilgrims are introduced. According to the Prologue, Chaucer's intention was to write four stories from the perspective of each pilgrim, two each on the way to and from their ultimate destination, Saint Thomas Becket's shrine (making for a total of about 120 stories).

== Text ==
The question of whether The Canterbury Tales is a finished work has not been answered to date. There are 84 manuscripts and four incunabula (printed before 1500) editions of the work, which is more than for any other vernacular English literary text with the exception of Prick of Conscience. This comparison should not be taken as evidence of the Tales' popularity in the century after Chaucer's death, because, according to Derek Pearsall, it is unfair considering that Prick of Conscience had all the benefit of the "preservation of a dogmatic religious subject-matter". Fifty-five of these manuscripts are thought to have been originally complete, while 28 are so fragmentary that it is difficult to ascertain whether they were copied individually or as part of a set. The Tales vary in both minor and major ways from manuscript to manuscript; many of the minor variations are due to copyists' errors, though this has not been conclusively proven, as research is divided over whether they were errors or simply copyists' own changes, additions, or deletions, while it is suggested that in other cases Chaucer both added to his work and revised it as it was being copied and possibly as it was being distributed.

There are no manuscripts of the Canterbury Tales surviving in Chaucer's own hand. The two earliest known manuscripts, which both appear to have been copied by the same scribe, are MS Peniarth 392 D (called "Hengwrt"), and the Ellesmere Manuscript, a deluxe, illustrated manuscript. Until the 1940s, scholars tended to prefer the Ellesmere manuscript as closer to Chaucer's intentions; following John M. Manly and Edith Rickert, scholars increasingly favored Hengwrt. The first version of The Canterbury Tales to be published in print was William Caxton's 1476 edition. It was one of the first books to be printed by Caxton, the first person in England to print books using a printing press. Only 10 copies of this edition are known to exist, including one held by the British Library and one held by the Folger Shakespeare Library.

The copyist of the Hengwrt and Ellesmere manuscripts has been identified as a scrivener named Adam Pinkhurst. Since a poem, apparently by Chaucer, identifies his scribe as a man named "Adam", this has led to the hypothesis that the scribe who copied these two important manuscripts worked with Chaucer and knew him personally. This identification has been the subject of much controversy in the field of Middle English palaeography, though it is widely accepted as plausible.

=== Order ===
There is no consensus on whether a complete version of the Tales exists, and no consensus on Chaucer's intended order of the stories. Textual and manuscript clues have been adduced to support the two most popular modern methods of ordering the tales.

Some scholarly editions divide the Tales into ten "Fragments". The tales that make up a Fragment are closely related and contain internal indications of their order of presentation, usually with one character speaking to and then stepping aside for another character. However, the connection between Fragments is less obvious. Consequently, there are several possible orders; the one most frequently seen in modern editions follows the numbering of the Fragments (ultimately based on the Ellesmere order).

In the Victorian era, it was common to use the nine "Groups" identified by F. J. Furnivall (1868) under the auspices of the Chaucer Society (which Furnivall himself had founded). For example, Walter William Skeat followed this ordering in his Chaucer: Complete Works, which was used by Oxford University Press for most of the twentieth century. However, Furnivall's ordering is seldom followed today; the position of its "Group C" matches none of the extant manuscripts, its only raison d'être being that Furnivall did not consider the three tales in Group D "sufficient for the 10 miles between Rochester and Sittingbourne."

Fragment	Group	Tales
Fragment I	A	General Prologue; The Knight's Tale; The Miller's Tale; The Reeve's Tale; The Cook's Tale
Fragment II	B^{1}	The Man of Law's Tale
Fragment III	D	The Wife of Bath's Tale; The Friar's Tale; The Summoner's Tale
Fragment IV	E	The Clerk's Tale; The Merchant's Tale
Fragment V	F	The Squire's Tale; The Franklin's Tale
Fragment VI	C	The Physician's Tale; The Pardoner's Tale
Fragment VII	B^{2}	The Shipman's Tale; The Prioress's Tale; Sir Thopas Tale; The Tale of Melibee; The Monk's Tale; The Nun's Priest's Tale
Fragment VIII	G	The Second Nun's Tale; The Canon's Yeoman's Tale
Fragment IX	H	The Manciple's Tale
Fragment X	I	The Parson's Tale

An alternative ordering (seen in the early 15th-century manuscript Harley MS. 7334) places Fragment VIII before VI. Fragments I and II almost always follow each other, just as VI and VII, IX and X do in the oldest manuscripts. Fragments IV and V, by contrast, vary in location from manuscript to manuscript.

== Language ==
The Merchant's Prologue
Recording in reconstructed Middle English pronunciation

Chaucer mainly wrote in a London dialect of late Middle English, which has clear differences from Modern English. From philological research, some facts are known about the pronunciation of English during the time of Chaucer. Chaucer pronounced -e at the end of many words, so that care (except when followed by a vowel sound) was [ˈkaːrə], not /kɛər/ as in Modern English. Other nowadays silent letters were also pronounced, so that the word knight was [kniçt], with both the k and the gh pronounced, not /naɪt/. In some cases, vowel letters in Middle English were pronounced very differently from Modern English, because the Great Vowel Shift had not yet happened. For instance, the long e in wepyng "weeping" was pronounced as [eː], as in modern German or Italian, not as /iː/. Below is an IPA transcription of the opening lines of The Merchant's Prologue:

'Wepyng and waylyng, care and oother sorwe
I knowe ynogh, on even and a-morwe,'
Quod the Marchant, 'and so doon oother mo
That wedded been.'

ˈweːpiŋɡ and ˈwailiŋɡ ‖ ˈkaːr‿and ˈoːðər ˈsɔrwə ‖
iː ˈknɔu iˈnoːx ‖ ɔn ˈɛːvən and aˈmɔrwə ‖
ˈkwɔd ðə ˈmartʃant ‖ and ˈsɔː ˈdoːn ˈoːðər ˈmɔː ‖
ðat ˈwɛddəd ˈbeːn ‖

'Weeping and wailing, care and other sorrow
I know enough, in the evening and in the morning,'
quoth the Merchant, 'and so do many others
who have been married.'

No manuscript exists in Chaucer's own hand; all extant copies were made by scribes. Because the final -e sound was lost soon after Chaucer's time, scribes did not accurately copy it, and this gave scholars the impression that Chaucer himself was inconsistent in using it. It has now been established, however, that -e was an important part of Chaucer's grammar, and helped to distinguish singular adjectives from plural and subjunctive verbs from indicative.

== Sources ==
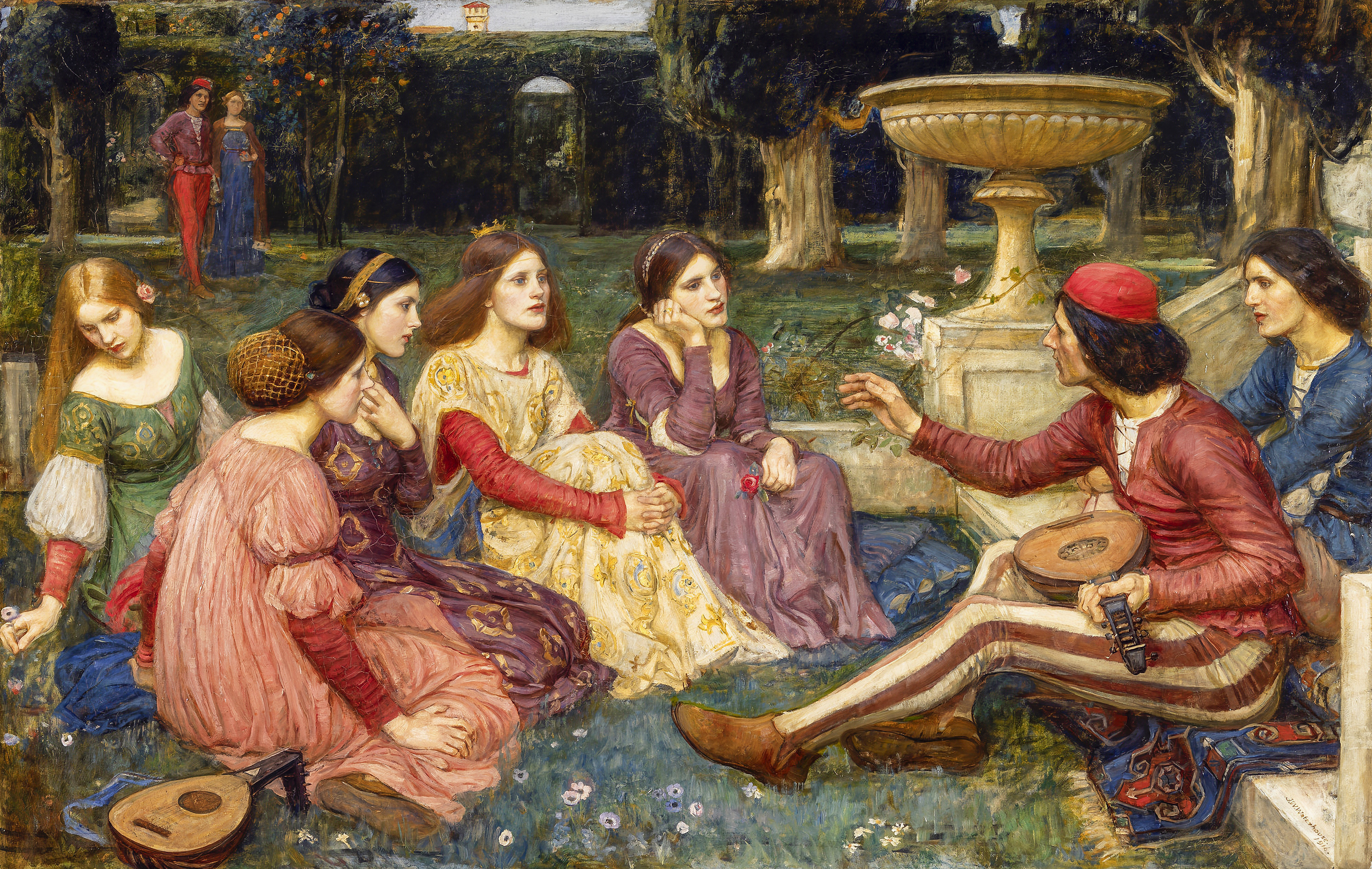
A Tale from the Decameron by John William Waterhouse

No other work prior to Chaucer's is known to have set a collection of tales within the framework of pilgrims on a pilgrimage. It is obvious, however, that Chaucer borrowed portions, sometimes very large portions, of his stories from earlier stories, and that his work was influenced by the general state of the literary world in which he lived. Storytelling was the main entertainment in England at the time, and storytelling contests had been around for hundreds of years. In 14th-century England, the English Pui was a group with an appointed leader who would judge the songs of the group. The winner received a crown and, as with the winner of The Canterbury Tales, a free dinner. It was common for pilgrims on a pilgrimage to have a chosen "master of ceremonies" to guide them and organise the journey. Harold Bloom suggests that the structure is mostly original, but inspired by the "pilgrim" figures of Dante and Virgil in The Divine Comedy. New research suggests that the General Prologue, in which the innkeeper and host Harry Bailey introduces each pilgrim, is a pastiche of the historical Harry Bailey's surviving 1381 poll-tax account of Southwark's inhabitants.

The Canterbury Tales contains more parallels to the Decameron, by Giovanni Boccaccio, than any other work. Like the Tales, the Decameron features a frame tale in which several different narrators tell a series of stories. In the Decameron, the characters have fled to the countryside to escape the Black Death. It ends with an apology by Boccaccio, much like Chaucer's Retraction to the Tales. A quarter of the tales in The Canterbury Tales parallel a tale in the Decameron, although most of them have closer parallels in other stories. Some scholars thus find it unlikely that Chaucer had a copy of the work on hand, surmising instead that he may have merely read the Decameron at some point. Chaucer may have read the Decameron during his first diplomatic mission to Italy in 1372. Chaucer used a wide variety of sources, but some, in particular, were used frequently over several tales, among them the Bible, Classical poetry by Ovid, and the works of contemporary Italian writers Petrarch and Dante. Chaucer was the first author to use the work of these last two. Boethius' Consolation of Philosophy appears in several tales, as do the works of John Gower, a friend of Chaucer's. Chaucer also seems to have borrowed from numerous religious encyclopaedias and liturgical writings, such as John Bromyard's Summa praedicantium, a preacher's handbook, and Jerome's Adversus Jovinianum. Many scholars say there is a good possibility Chaucer met Petrarch or Boccaccio.

== Genre and structure ==
Canterbury Cathedral from the north west c. 1890–1900 (retouched from a black & white photograph)

The Canterbury Tales is a collection of stories built around a frame tale, a common and already long established genre in this period. Chaucer's Tales differs from most other story "collections" in this genre chiefly in its intense variation. Most story collections focused on a theme, usually a religious one. Even in the Decameron, storytellers are encouraged to stick to the theme decided on for the day. The idea of a pilgrimage to get such a diverse collection of people together for literary purposes was also unprecedented, though "the association of pilgrims and storytelling was a familiar one". Introducing a competition among the tales encourages the reader to compare the tales in all their variety, and allows Chaucer to showcase the breadth of his skill in different genres and literary forms.

While the structure of the Tales is largely linear, with one story following another, it is also much more than that. In the General Prologue, Chaucer describes not the tales to be told, but the people who will tell them, making it clear that structure will depend on the characters rather than a general theme or moral. This idea is reinforced when the Miller interrupts to tell his tale after the Knight has finished his. Having the Knight go first gives one the idea that all will tell their stories by class, with the Monk following the Knight. However, the Miller's interruption makes it clear that this structure will be abandoned in favour of a free and open exchange of stories among all classes present. General themes and points of view arise as the characters tell their tales, which are responded to by other characters in their own tales, sometimes after a long lapse in which the theme has not been addressed.

Lastly, Chaucer does not pay much attention to the progress of the trip, to the time passing as the pilgrims travel, or to specific locations along the way to Canterbury. His writing of the story seems focused primarily on the stories being told, and not on the pilgrimage itself.

== Style ==
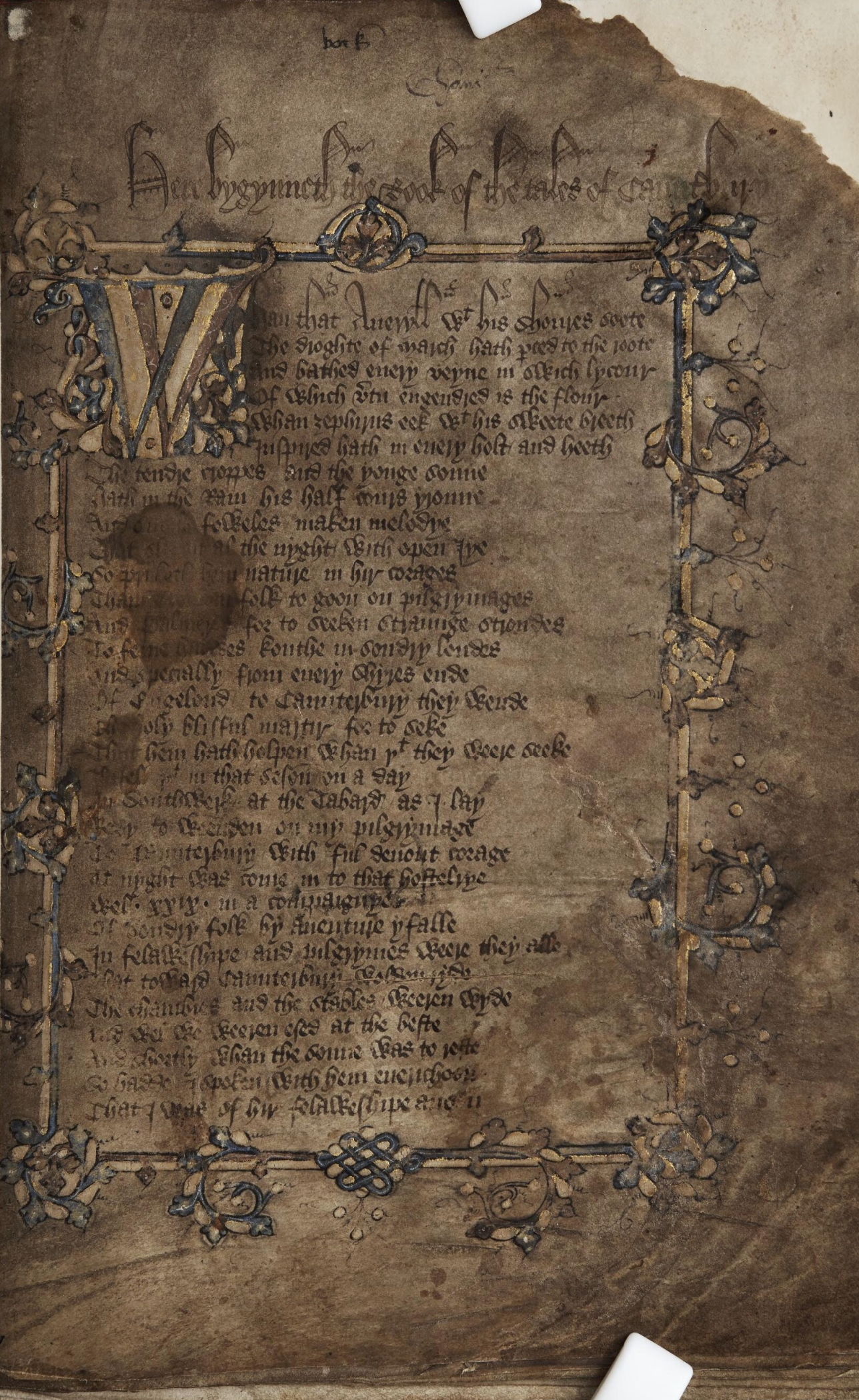
Title page of Geoffrey Chaucer's Canterbury Tales in the hand of "Scribe B", identified as Adam Pinkhurst, c. 1400.

The variety of Chaucer's tales shows the breadth of his skill and his familiarity with many literary forms, linguistic styles, and rhetorical devices. Medieval schools of rhetoric at the time encouraged such diversity, dividing literature (as Virgil suggests) into high, middle, and low styles as measured by the density of rhetorical forms and vocabulary. Another popular method of division came from St. Augustine, who focused more on audience response and less on subject matter (a Virgilian concern). Augustine divided literature into "majestic persuades", "temperate pleases", and "subdued teaches". Writers were encouraged to write in a way that kept in mind the speaker, subject, audience, purpose, manner, and occasion. Chaucer moves freely between all of these styles, showing favouritism to none. He not only considers the readers of his work as an audience, but the other pilgrims within the story as well, creating a multi-layered rhetoric.

With this, Chaucer avoids targeting any specific audience or social class of readers, focusing instead on the characters of the story and writing their tales with a skill proportional to their social status and learning. However, even the lowest characters, such as the Miller, show surprising rhetorical ability, although their subject matter is more lowbrow. Vocabulary also plays an important part, as those of the higher classes refer to a woman as a "lady", while the lower classes use the word "wenche", with no exceptions. At times the same word will mean entirely different things between classes. The word "pitee", for example, is a noble concept to the upper classes, while in the Merchant's Tale it refers to sexual intercourse. Again, however, tales such as the Nun's Priest's Tale show surprising skill with words among the lower classes of the group, while the Knight's Tale is at times extremely simple.

Chaucer uses the same metre throughout almost all of his tales, with the exception of Sir Thopas and his prose tales. This is a line characterised by five stressed syllables, usually alternating with unstressed syllables to produce lines usually of ten syllables, but often eleven and occasionally nine; occasionally a caesura can be identified around the middle of a line. This metre was probably inspired by French and Italian forms. Chaucer's metre would later develop into the heroic metre of the 15th and 16th centuries sometimes known as riding rhyme, and is an ancestor of iambic pentameter. Chaucer's verse is usually also characterised by couplet rhyme, but he avoided allowing couplets to become too prominent in The Canterbury Tales, and four of the tales (the Man of Law's, Clerk's, Prioress', and Second Nun's) use rhyme royal.

== Historical context and themes ==
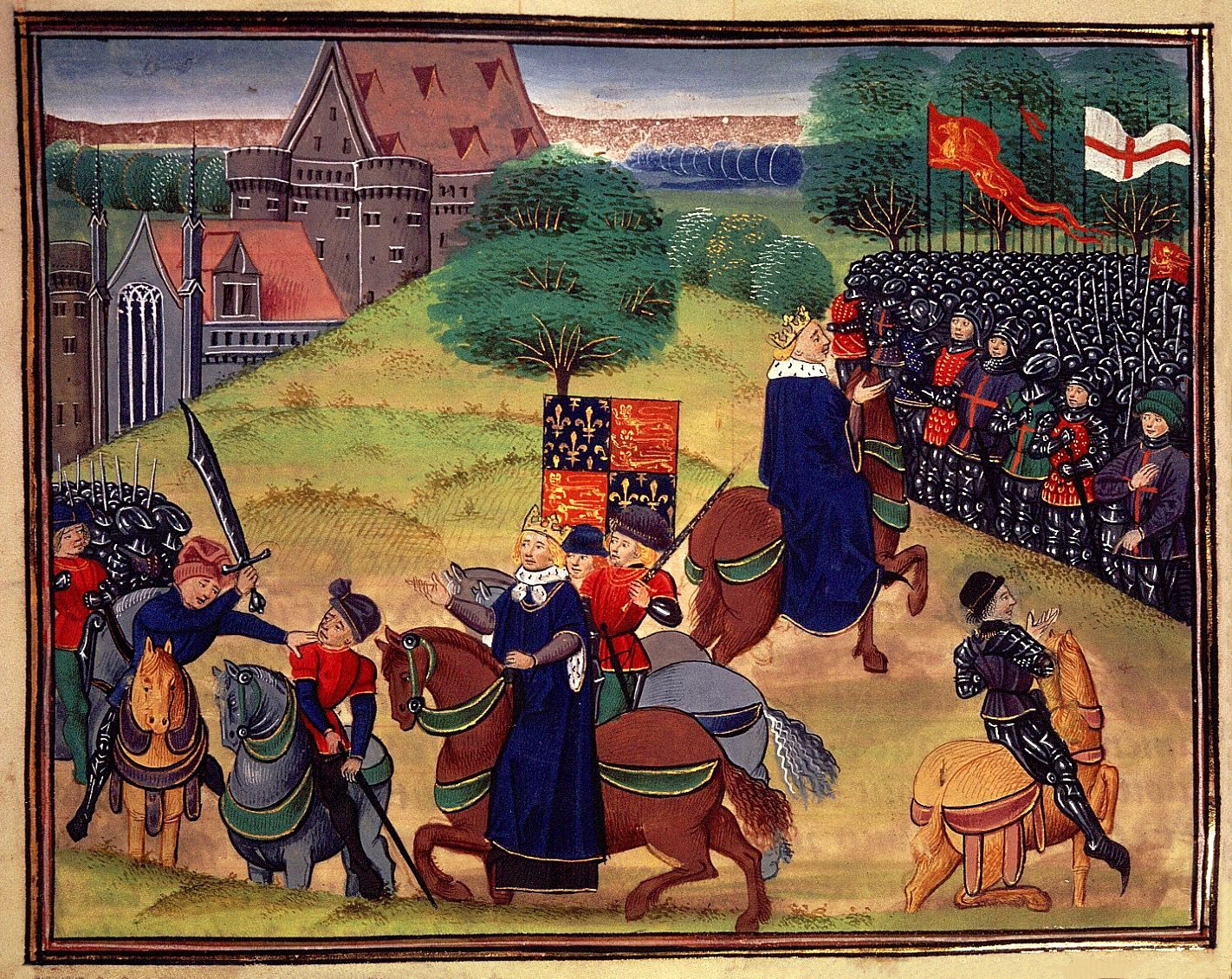
The Peasants' Revolt of 1381 is mentioned in the Tales.

In 1386, Chaucer became Controller of Customs and Justice of the Peace and, in 1389, Clerk of the King's Works. It was during these years that Chaucer began working on The Canterbury Tales.

The end of the fourteenth century was a turbulent time in English history. The Catholic Church was in the midst of the Western Schism and, although it was still the only Christian authority in Western Europe, it was the subject of heavy controversy. Lollardy, an early English religious movement led by John Wycliffe, is mentioned in the Tales, which also mention a specific incident involving pardoners (sellers of indulgences, which were believed to relieve the temporal punishment due for sins that were already forgiven in the Sacrament of Confession) who nefariously claimed to be collecting for St. Mary Rouncesval hospital in England. The Canterbury Tales is among the first English literary works to mention paper, a relatively new invention that allowed dissemination of the written word never before seen in England. Political clashes, such as the 1381 Peasants' Revolt and clashes ending in the deposing of King Richard II, further reveal the complex turmoil surrounding Chaucer in the time of the Tales' writing. Many of his close friends were executed and he himself moved to Kent to get away from events in London.

While some readers look to interpret the characters of The Canterbury Tales as historical figures, other readers choose to interpret its significance in less literal terms. After analysis of Chaucer's diction and historical context, his work appears to develop a critique of society during his lifetime. Within a number of his descriptions, his comments can appear complimentary in nature, but through clever language, the statements are ultimately critical of the pilgrim's actions. It is unclear whether Chaucer would intend for the reader to link his characters with actual persons. Instead, it appears that Chaucer creates fictional characters to be general representations of people in such fields of work. With an understanding of medieval society, one can detect subtle satire at work.

=== Religion ===
The Tales reflect diverse views of the Church in Chaucer's England. After the Black Death, many Europeans began to question the authority of the established Church. Some turned to Lollardy, while others chose less extreme paths, starting new monastic orders or smaller movements exposing church corruption in the behaviour of the clergy, false church relics or abuse of indulgences. Several characters in the Tales are religious figures, and the very setting of the pilgrimage to Canterbury is religious (although the prologue comments ironically on its merely seasonal attractions), making religion a significant theme of the work.

Two characters, the Pardoner and the Summoner, whose roles apply the Church's secular power, are both portrayed as deeply corrupt, greedy, and abusive. Pardoners in Chaucer's day were those people from whom one bought Church "indulgences" for forgiveness of sins, who were guilty of abusing their office for their own gain. Chaucer's Pardoner openly admits the corruption of his practice while hawking his wares. Summoners were Church officers who brought sinners to the Church court for possible excommunication and other penalties. Corrupt summoners would write false citations and frighten people into bribing them to protect their interests. Chaucer's Summoner is portrayed as guilty of the very kinds of sins for which he is threatening to bring others to court, and is hinted as having a corrupt relationship with the Pardoner. In The Friar's Tale, one of the characters is a summoner who is shown to be working on the side of the devil, not God.

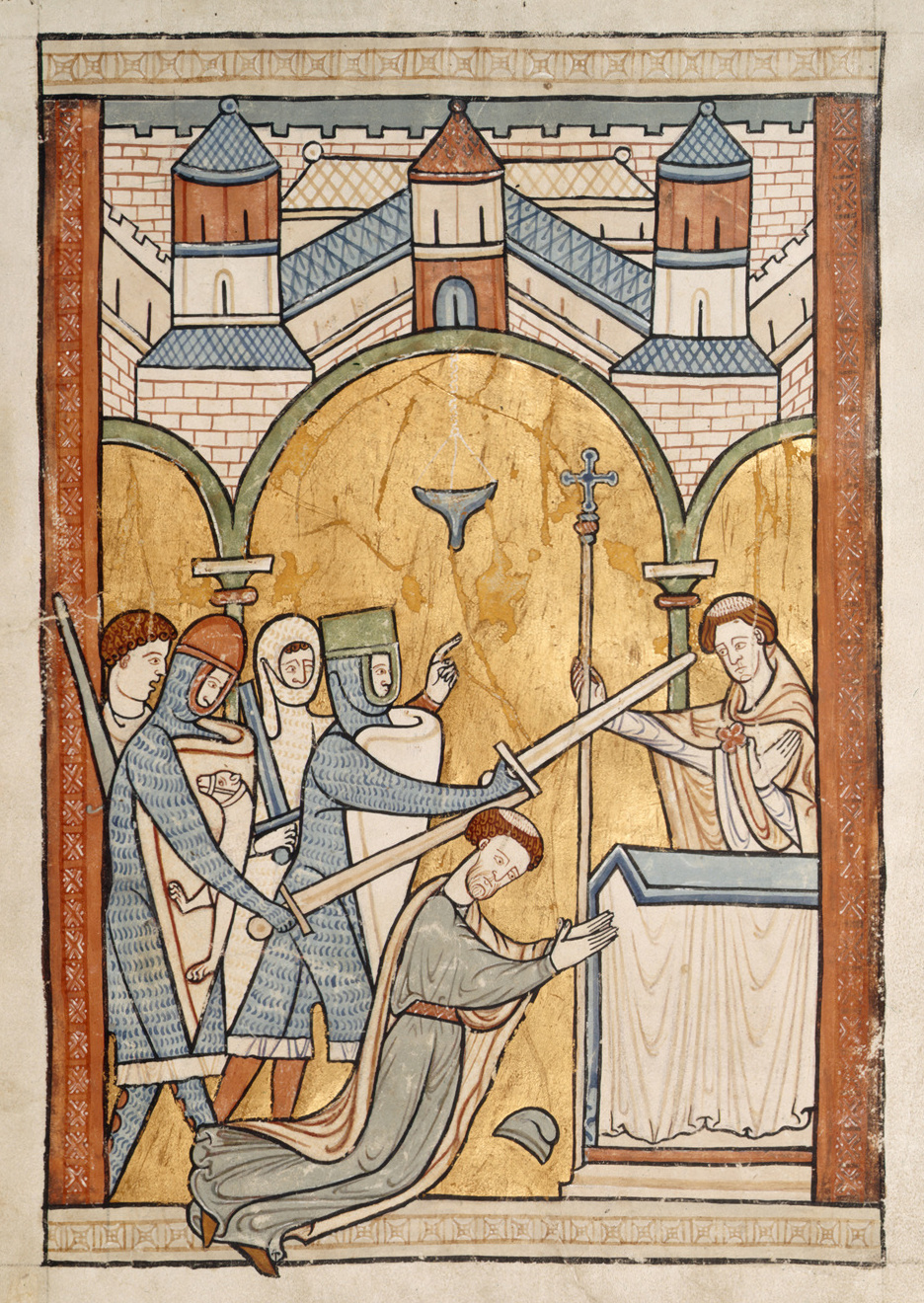
The murder of Thomas Becket

Churchmen of various kinds are represented by the Monk, the Prioress, the Nun's Priest, and the Second Nun. Monastic orders, which originated from a desire to follow an ascetic lifestyle separated from the world, had by Chaucer's time become increasingly entangled in worldly matters. Monasteries frequently controlled huge tracts of land on which they made significant sums of money, while peasants worked in their employ. The Second Nun is an example of what a Nun was expected to be: her tale is about a woman whose chaste example brings people into the church. The Monk and the Prioress, on the other hand, while not as corrupt as the Summoner or Pardoner, fall far short of the ideal for their orders. Both are expensively dressed, show signs of lives of luxury and flirtatiousness and show a lack of spiritual depth. The Prioress's Tale is an account of Jews murdering a deeply pious and innocent Christian boy, a blood libel against Jews that became a part of English literary tradition. The story did not originate in the works of Chaucer and was well known in the 14th century.

Pilgrimage was a very prominent feature of medieval society. The ultimate pilgrimage destination was Jerusalem, but within England Canterbury was a popular destination. Pilgrims would journey to cathedrals that preserved relics of saints, believing that such relics held miraculous powers. Saint Thomas Becket, Archbishop of Canterbury, had been murdered in Canterbury Cathedral by knights of Henry II during a disagreement between Church and Crown. Miracle stories connected to his remains sprang up soon after his death, and the cathedral became a popular pilgrimage destination. The pilgrimage in the work ties all of the stories together and may be considered a representation of Christians' striving for heaven, despite weaknesses, disagreement, and diversity of opinion.

=== Social class and convention ===
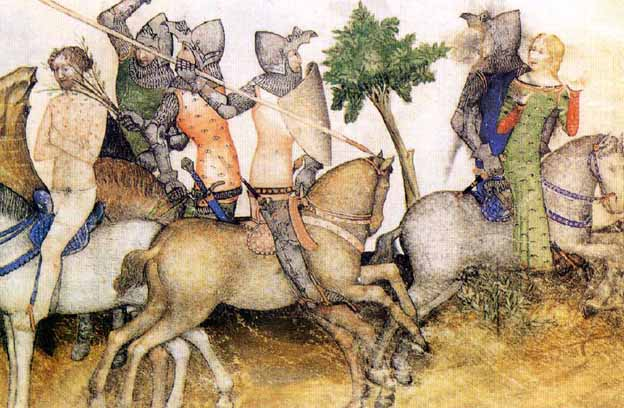
Bors' Dilemma – he chooses to save a maiden rather than his brother Lionel

The upper class or nobility, represented chiefly by the Knight and his Squire, was in Chaucer's time steeped in a culture of chivalry and courtliness. Nobles were expected to be powerful warriors who could be ruthless on the battlefield yet mannerly in the King's Court and Christian in their actions. Knights were expected to form a strong social bond with the men who fought alongside them, but an even stronger bond with a woman whom they idealised to strengthen their fighting ability. Though the aim of chivalry was to noble action, its conflicting values often degenerated into violence. Church leaders frequently tried to place restrictions on jousts and tournaments, which at times ended in the death of the loser. The Knight's Tale shows how the brotherly love of two fellow knights turns into a deadly feud at the sight of a woman whom both idealise. To win her, both are willing to fight to the death. Chivalry was on the decline in Chaucer's day, and it is possible that The Knight's Tale was intended to show its flaws, although this is disputed. Chaucer himself had fought in the Hundred Years' War under Edward III, who heavily emphasised chivalry during his reign. Two tales, Sir Topas and The Tale of Melibee, are told by Chaucer himself, who is travelling with the pilgrims in his own story. Both tales seem to focus on the ill-effects of chivalry—the first making fun of chivalric rules and the second warning against violence.

The Tales constantly reflect the conflict between classes. For example, the division of the three estates: the characters are all divided into three distinct classes, the classes being "those who pray" (the clergy), "those who fight" (the nobility), and "those who work" (the commoners and peasantry). Most of the tales are interlinked by common themes, and some "quit" (reply to or retaliate against) other tales. Convention is followed when the Knight begins the game with a tale, as he represents the highest social class in the group. But when he is followed by the Miller, who represents a lower class, it sets the stage for the Tales to reflect both a respect for and a disregard for upper class rules. Helen Cooper, as well as Mikhail Bakhtin and Derek Brewer, call this opposition "the ordered and the grotesque, Lent and Carnival, officially approved culture and its riotous, and high-spirited underside." Several works of the time contained the same opposition.

=== Relativism versus realism ===
Chaucer's characters each express different—sometimes vastly different—views of reality, creating an atmosphere of testing, empathy, and relativism. As Cooper says, "Different genres give different readings of the world: the fabliau scarcely notices the operations of God, the saint's life focuses on those at the expense of physical reality, tracts and sermons insist on prudential or orthodox morality, romances privilege human emotion." The sheer number of varying persons and stories renders the Tales as a set unable to arrive at any definite truth or reality.

=== Liminality ===
The concept of liminality figures prominently within The Canterbury Tales. A liminal space, which can be both geographical as well as metaphorical or spiritual, is the transitional or transformational space between a "real" (secure, known, limited) world and an unknown or imaginary space of both risk and possibility. The notion of a pilgrimage is itself a liminal experience, because it centres on travel between destinations and because pilgrims undertake it hoping to become more holy in the process. Thus, the structure of The Canterbury Tales itself is liminal; it not only covers the distance between London and Canterbury, but the majority of the tales refer to places entirely outside the geography of the pilgrimage. Jean Jost summarises the function of liminality in The Canterbury Tales,

Both appropriately and ironically in this raucous and subversive liminal space, a ragtag assembly gather together and tell their equally unconventional tales. In this unruly place, the rules of tale telling are established, themselves to be both disordered and broken; here the tales of game and earnest, solas and sentence, will be set and interrupted. Here the sacred and profane adventure begins, but does not end. Here, the condition of peril is as prominent as that of protection. The act of pilgrimaging itself consists of moving from one urban space, through liminal rural space, to the next urban space with an ever fluctuating series of events and narratives punctuating those spaces. The goal of pilgrimage may well be a religious or spiritual space at its conclusion, and reflect a psychological progression of the spirit, in yet another kind of emotional space.

Liminality is also evident in the individual tales. An obvious instance of this is The Friar's Tale in which the yeoman devil is a liminal figure because of his transitory nature and function; it is his purpose to issue souls from their current existence to hell, an entirely different one. The Franklin's Tale is a Breton Lai tale, which takes the tale into a liminal space by invoking not only the interaction of the supernatural and the mortal, but also the relation between the present and the imagined past.

== Reception ==
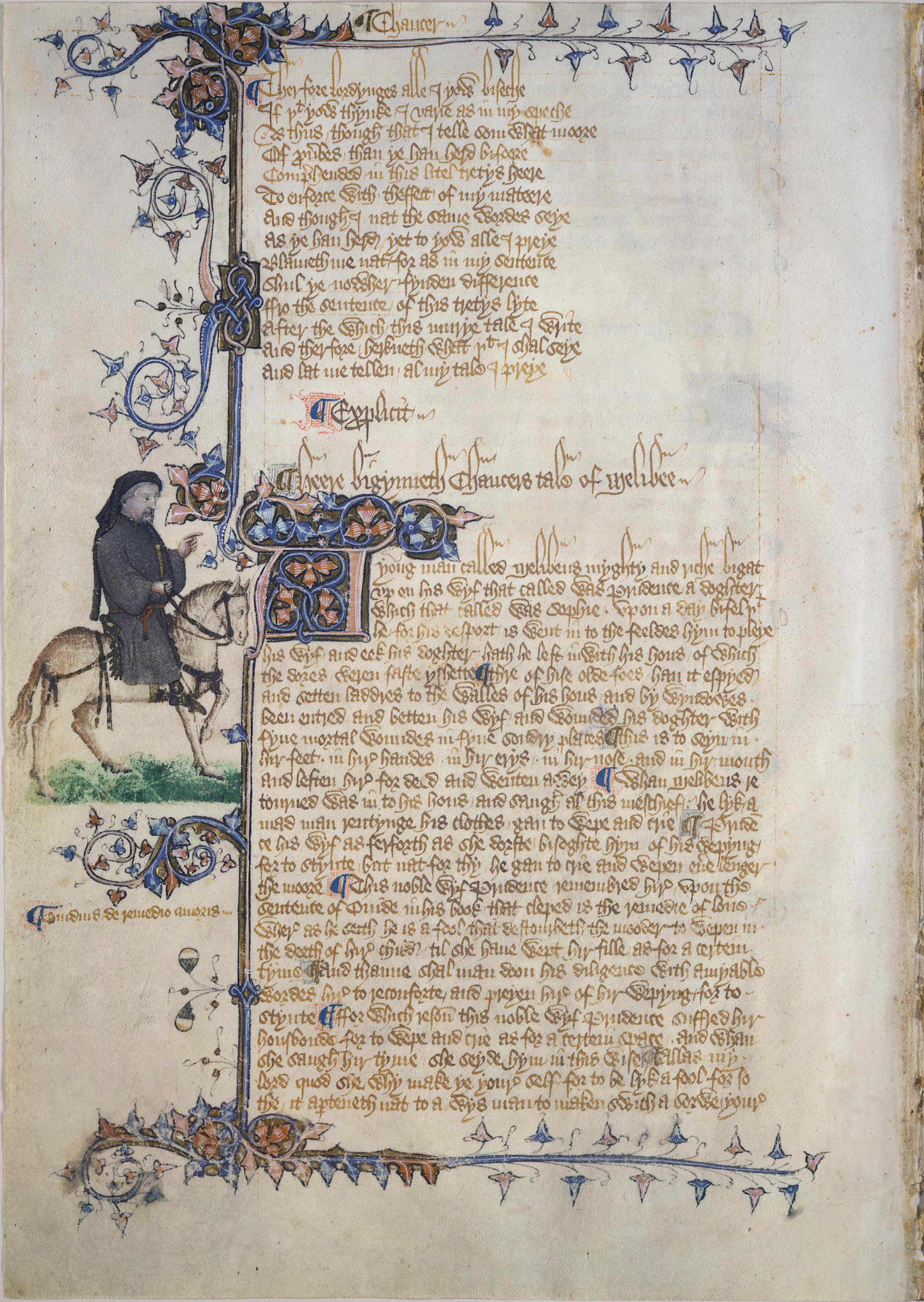
Chaucer as a pilgrim from the Ellesmere manuscript

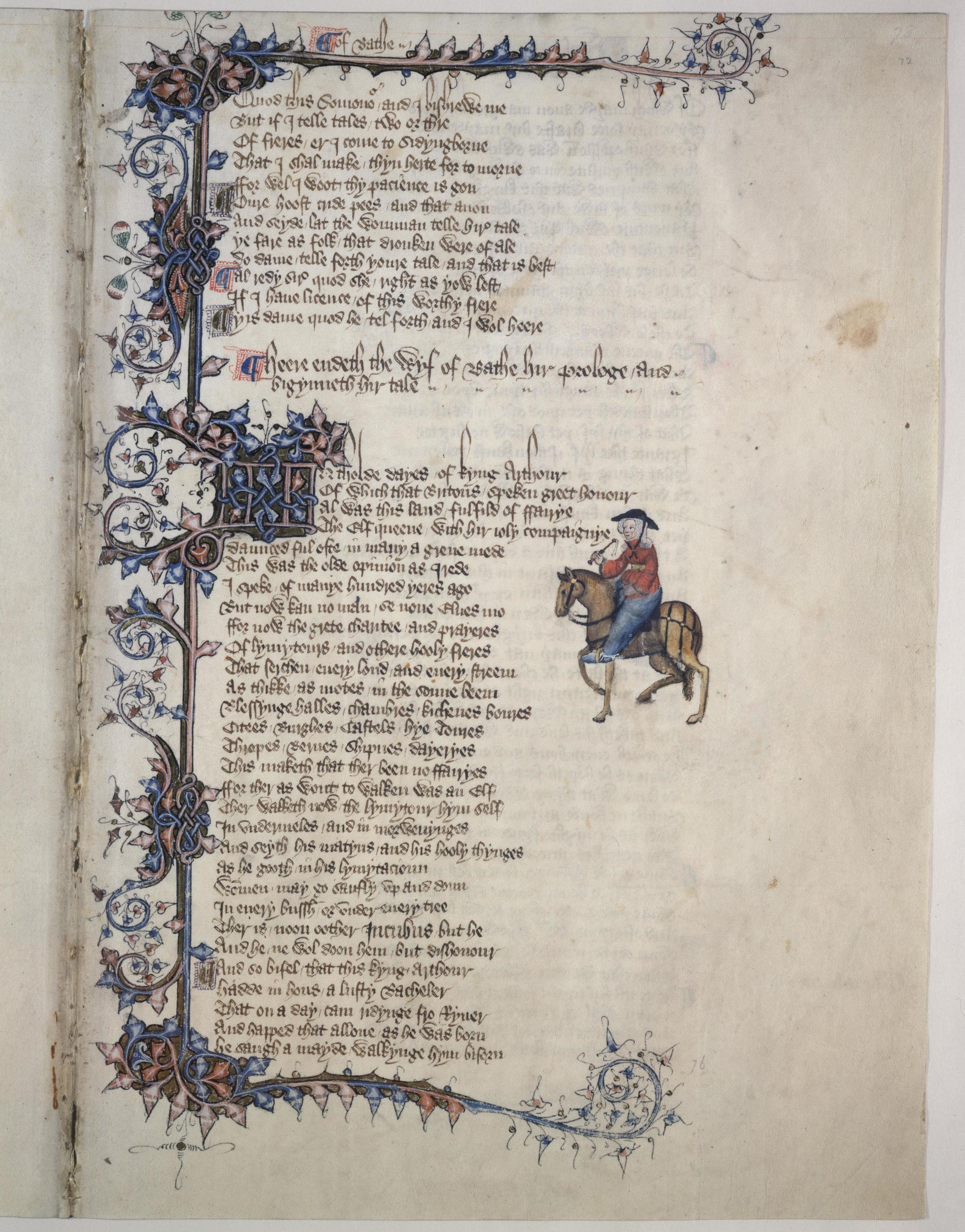
Prologue of The Wife of Bath's Tale from the Ellesmere Manuscript

While Chaucer clearly states the addressees of many of his poems (the Book of the Duchess is believed to have been written for John of Gaunt on the occasion of his wife's death in 1368), the intended audience of The Canterbury Tales is more difficult to determine. Chaucer was a courtier, leading some to believe that he was mainly a court poet who wrote exclusively for the nobility. He is referred to as a noble translator and poet by Eustache Deschamps and by his contemporary John Gower. It has been suggested that the poem was intended to be read aloud, which is probable as this was a common activity at the time. However, it also seems to have been intended for private reading, since Chaucer frequently refers to himself as the writer, rather than the speaker, of the work. Determining the intended audience directly from the text is even more difficult, since the audience is part of the story. This makes it difficult to tell when Chaucer is writing to the fictional pilgrim audience or the actual reader.

Chaucer's works may have been distributed in some form during his lifetime in part or in whole. Scholars speculate that manuscripts were circulated among his friends, but likely remained unknown to most people until after his death. However, the speed with which copyists strove to write complete versions of his tale in manuscript form shows that Chaucer was a famous and respected poet in his own day. The Hengwrt and Ellesmere manuscripts are examples of the care taken to distribute the work. More manuscript copies of the poem exist than for any other poem of its day except The Prick of Conscience, causing some scholars to give it the medieval equivalent of bestseller status. Even the most elegant of the illustrated manuscripts, however, is not nearly as highly decorated as the work of authors of more respectable works such as John Lydgate's religious and historical literature.

=== 15th century ===
John Lydgate and Thomas Occleve were among the first critics of Chaucer's Tales, praising the poet as the greatest English poet of all time and the first to show what the language was truly capable of poetically. This sentiment was universally agreed upon by later critics into the mid-15th century. Glosses included in The Canterbury Tales manuscripts of the time praised him highly for his skill with "sentence" and rhetoric, the two pillars by which medieval critics judged poetry. The most respected of the tales was at this time the Knight's, as it was full of both.

== Literary additions and supplements ==
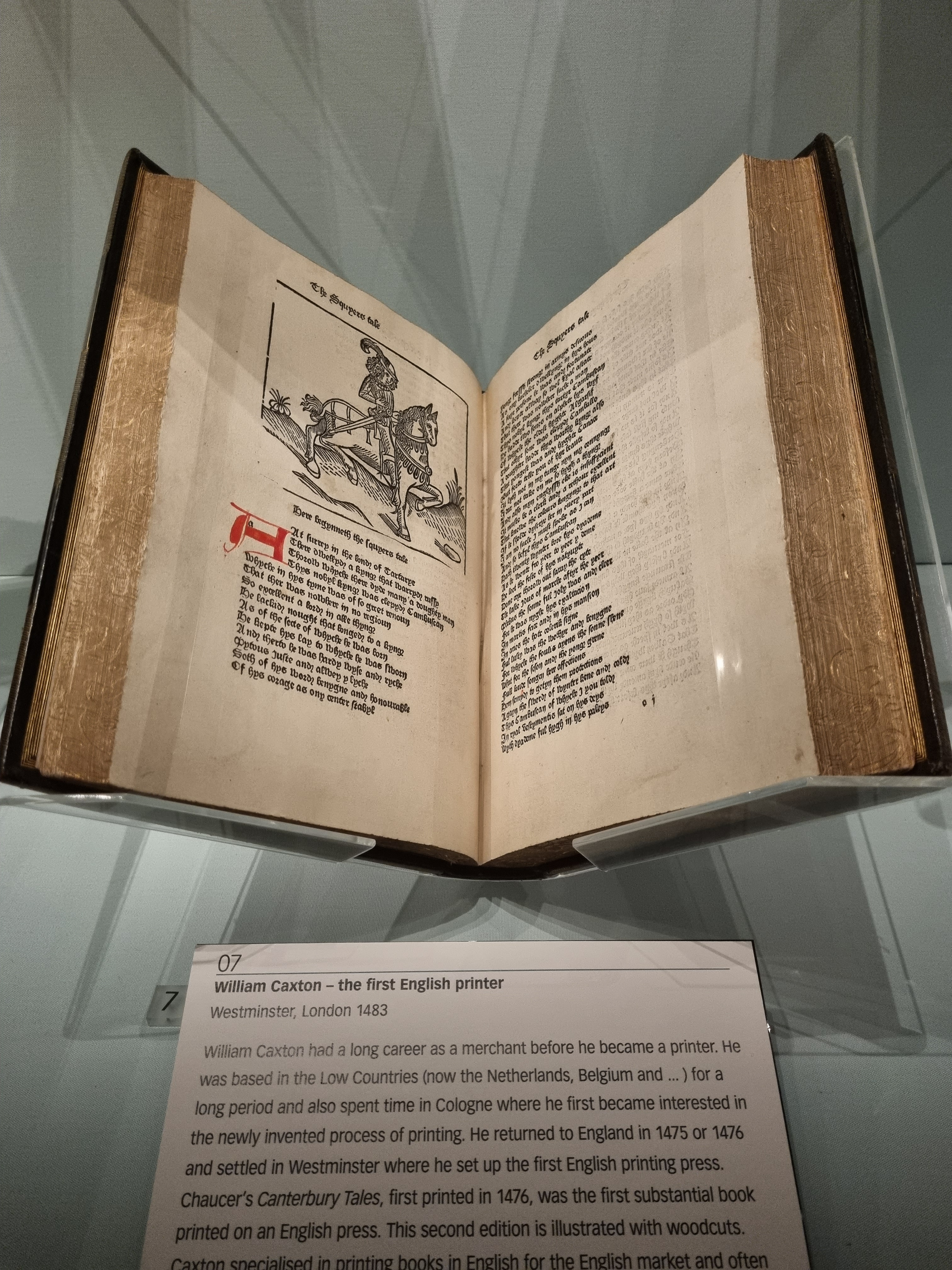
Canterbury Tales, William Caxton edition

The incompleteness of the Tales led several medieval authors to write additions and supplements to the tales to make them more complete. Some of the oldest existing manuscripts of the tales include new or modified tales, showing that even early on, such additions were being created. These emendations included various expansions of the Cook's Tale, which Chaucer never finished, The Plowman's Tale, The Tale of Gamelyn, the Siege of Thebes, and the Tale of Beryn.

The Tale of Beryn, written by an anonymous author in the 15th century, is preceded by a lengthy prologue in which the pilgrims arrive at Canterbury and their activities there are described. While the rest of the pilgrims disperse throughout the town, the Pardoner seeks the affections of Kate the barmaid, but faces problems dealing with the man in her life and the innkeeper Harry Bailey. As the pilgrims turn back home, the Merchant restarts the storytelling with Tale of Beryn. In this tale, a young man named Beryn travels from Rome to Egypt to seek his fortune only to be cheated by other businessmen there. He is then aided by a local man in getting his revenge. The tale comes from the French tale Bérinus and exists in a single early manuscript of the tales, although it was printed along with the tales in a 1721 edition by John Urry.

John Lydgate wrote The Siege of Thebes in about 1420. Like the Tale of Beryn, it is preceded by a prologue in which the pilgrims arrive in Canterbury. Lydgate places himself among the pilgrims as one of them and describes how he was a part of Chaucer's trip and heard the stories. He characterises himself as a monk and tells a long story about the history of Thebes before the events of the Knight's Tale. John Lydgate's tale was popular early on and exists in old manuscripts both on its own and as part of the Tales. It was first printed as early as 1561 by John Stow, and several editions for centuries after followed suit.

There are actually two versions of The Plowman's Tale, both of which are influenced by the story Piers Plowman, a work written during Chaucer's lifetime. Chaucer describes a Plowman in the General Prologue of his tales, but never gives him his own tale. One tale, written by Thomas Occleve, describes the miracle of the Virgin and the Sleeveless Garment. Another tale features a pelican and a griffin debating church corruption, with the pelican taking a position of protest akin to John Wycliffe's ideas.

The Tale of Gamelyn was included in an early manuscript version of the tales, Harley 7334, which is notorious for being one of the lower-quality early manuscripts in terms of editor error and alteration. It is now widely rejected by scholars as an authentic Chaucerian tale, although some scholars think he may have intended to rewrite the story as a tale for the Yeoman. Dates for its authorship vary from 1340 to 1370.

== Later adaptations and homages ==
=== Books ===
- The most well-known work of the 18th century writer Harriet Lee was called The Canterbury Tales, and consists of twelve stories, related by travellers thrown together by untoward accident. In turn, Lee's version had a profound influence on Lord Byron.
- E. Nesbit's 1901 book The Wouldbegoods includes an episode where the children protagonists re-enact the pilgrimage, taking on some of the character roles.
- Henry Dudeney's 1907 book The Canterbury Puzzles contains a part reputedly lost from what modern readers know as Chaucer's tales.
- Historical-mystery novelist P.C. Doherty wrote a series of novels based on The Canterbury Tales, making use of both the story frame and Chaucer's characters.
- Science-fiction writer Dan Simmons wrote his Hugo Award winning 1989 novel Hyperion based on an extra-planetary group of pilgrims.
- Evolutionary biologist Richard Dawkins used The Canterbury Tales as a structure for his 2004 non-fiction book about evolution titled The Ancestor's Tale: A Pilgrimage to the Dawn of Evolution. His animal pilgrims are on their way to find the common ancestor, each telling a tale about evolution.
- Canadian author Angie Abdou translates The Canterbury Tales to a cross section of people, all snow-sports enthusiasts but from different social backgrounds, converging on a remote back-country ski cabin in British Columbia in the 2011 novel The Canterbury Trail.
- British poet and performer Patience Agbabi is one of fourteen authors who worked together to tell the stories and experiences of refugees, detainees, and asylum seekers in a book titled Refugee Tales. The collaborative efforts of the writers and displaced people create stories modeled after Chaucer's tale of journey in The Canterbury Tales. This project is rooted in the efforts of the Gatwick Detainees Welfare Group, a non-partisan advocacy group for detained people.
- British artist Monster Chetwynd, under the name Marvin Gaye Chetwynd, produced an illustrated edition of a selection of the Tales in 2014.

=== Stage adaptations ===
- The Two Noble Kinsmen, by William Shakespeare and John Fletcher, a retelling of "The Knight's Tale", was first performed in 1613 or 1614 and published in 1634.
- In 1961, Erik Chisholm completed his opera, The Canterbury Tales. The opera is in three acts: The Wyf of Bath's Tale, The Pardoner's Tale and The Nun's Priest's Tale.
- Nevill Coghill's modern English version formed the basis of a musical version that was first staged in 1964.
- In 2021, Zadie Smith debuted her first play, The Wife of Willesden, adapting the Wife of Bath's Prologue and Tale as told at a contemporary bar crawl, with the tale set in 17th century Jamaica. The work was originally performed in London and at the American Repertory Theater in Cambridge, Massachusetts in 2023.

=== Film and television ===
- A Canterbury Tale, a 1944 film, jointly written and directed by Michael Powell and Emeric Pressburger, is loosely based on the narrative frame of Chaucer's tales. The movie opens with a group of medieval pilgrims journeying through the Kentish countryside as a narrator speaks the opening lines of the General Prologue. The scene then makes a now-famous transition to the time of World War II. From that point on, the film follows a group of strangers, each with their own story and in need of some kind of redemption, who are making their way to Canterbury together. The film's main story takes place in an imaginary town in Kent and ends with the main characters arriving at Canterbury Cathedral, bells pealing and Chaucer's words again resounding. A Canterbury Tale is recognised as one of the Powell-Pressburger team's most poetic and artful films. It was produced as wartime propaganda, using Chaucer's poetry, referring to the famous pilgrimage, and offering photography of Kent to remind the public of what made Britain worth fighting for. In one scene, a local historian lectures an audience of British soldiers about the pilgrims of Chaucer's time and the vibrant history of England.
- Pier Paolo Pasolini's 1972 film The Canterbury Tales features several of the tales, some of which cohere to the original tale and others which are embellished. "The Cook's Tale", for instance, which is incomplete in the original version, is expanded into a full story, and "The Friar's Tale" extends the scene in which the Summoner is dragged down to hell. The film includes these two tales as well as "The Miller's Tale", "The Summoner's Tale", "The Wife of Bath's Tale", and "The Merchant's Tale". "The Tale of Sir Topas" was also filmed and dubbed; however, it was later removed by Pasolini, and is now considered lost.
- Alan Plater retold the stories in a series of plays for BBC2 in 1975: Trinity Tales.
- On 26 April 1986, American radio personality Garrison Keillor opened "The News from Lake Wobegon" portion of the first live TV broadcast of his A Prairie Home Companion radio show with a reading of the original Middle English text of the General Prologue. He commented, "Although those words were written more than 600 years ago, they still describe spring."
- Jonathan Myerson directed an animated version of The Canterbury Tales in three parts from 1998 to 2000. The series was nominated for an Oscar (as animated short film) in 1999 and won the BAFTA Award for Best Animated Film in addition to four Primetime Emmys.
- The 2001 film A Knight's Tale, starring Heath Ledger, takes its title from Chaucer's "The Knight's Tale" and features Chaucer as a character.
- In 2003, the BBC again featured modern re-tellings of selected tales in their six-episode series Canterbury Tales.

=== Music ===
- Recorded in 1965, Lester Trimble's Four Fragments from the Caunterbury Tales sets to music four excerpts: "Prologe," "A Knyght," "A Yong Squier," and "The Wyf Of Biside Bathe." It is available in the Internet Archive.
- British Psychedelic rock band Procol Harum's 1967 hit "A Whiter Shade of Pale" is often assumed to be referencing the Canterbury Tales through the line, "as the miller told his tale." However, lyricist Keith Reid has denied this, saying he had never read Chaucer when he wrote the line.
- The title of Sting's 1993 album Ten Summoner's Tales alludes to "The Summoner's Tale" and to Sting's birth name, Gordon Sumner.
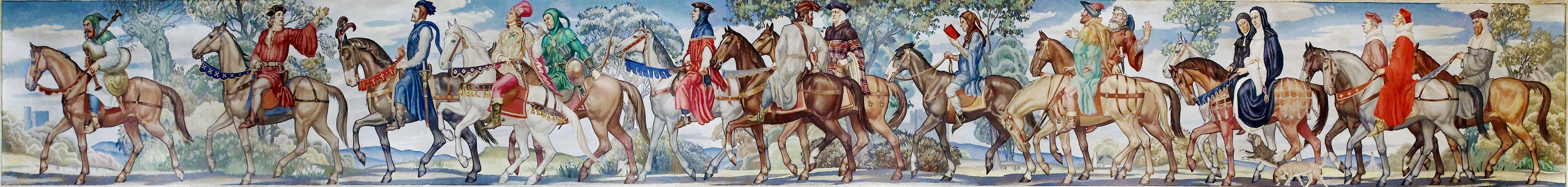
Ezra Winter, Canterbury Tales mural (1939), Library of Congress John Adams Building, Washington, D.C. This mural is located on the west wall of the North Reading Room, and features the Miller, Host, Knight, Squire, Yeoman, Doctor, Chaucer, Man of Law, Clerk, Manciple, Sailor, Prioress, Nun, and three Priests; the other pilgrims appear on the east wall mural.
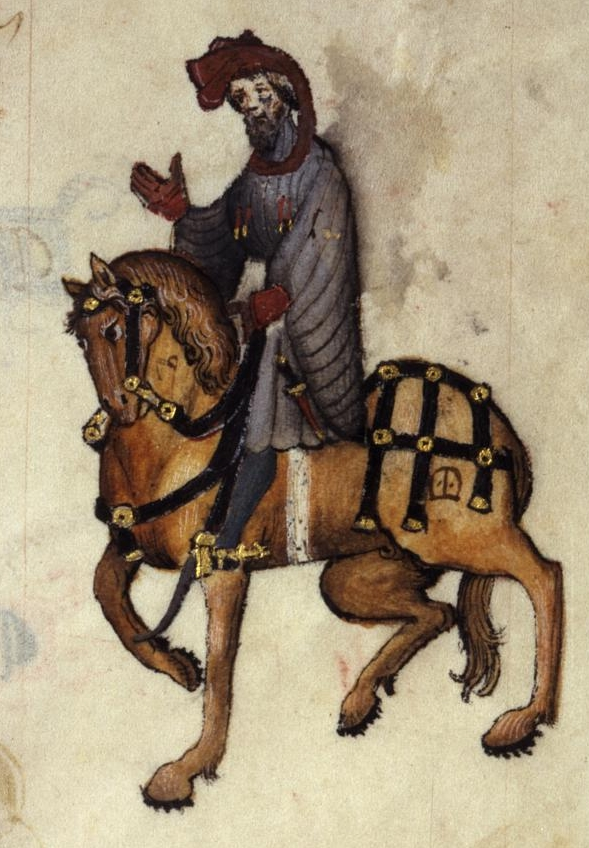
The Knight

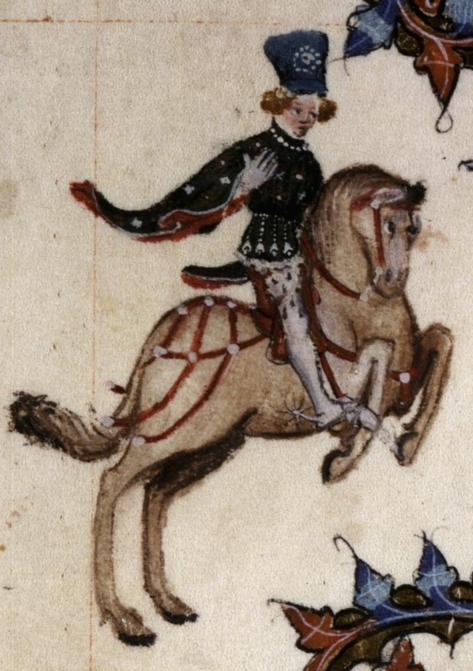
The Squire

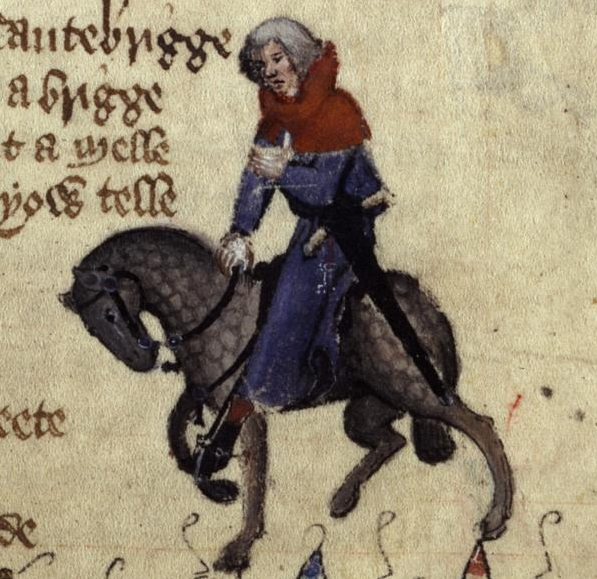
Oswald The Reeve

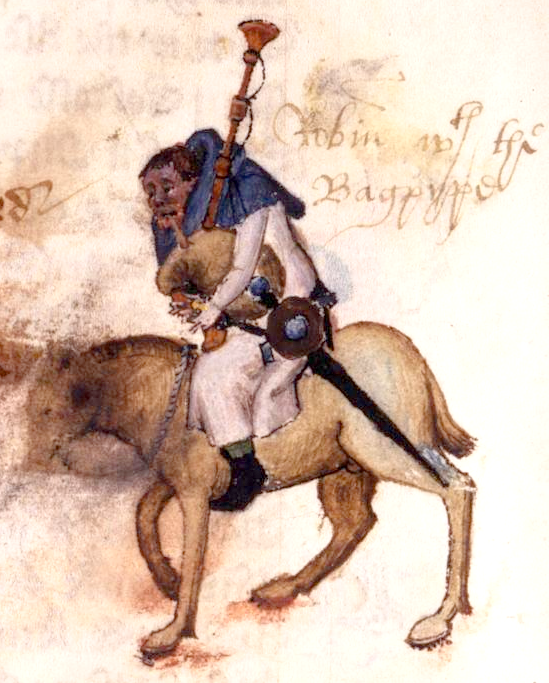
Robin The Miller

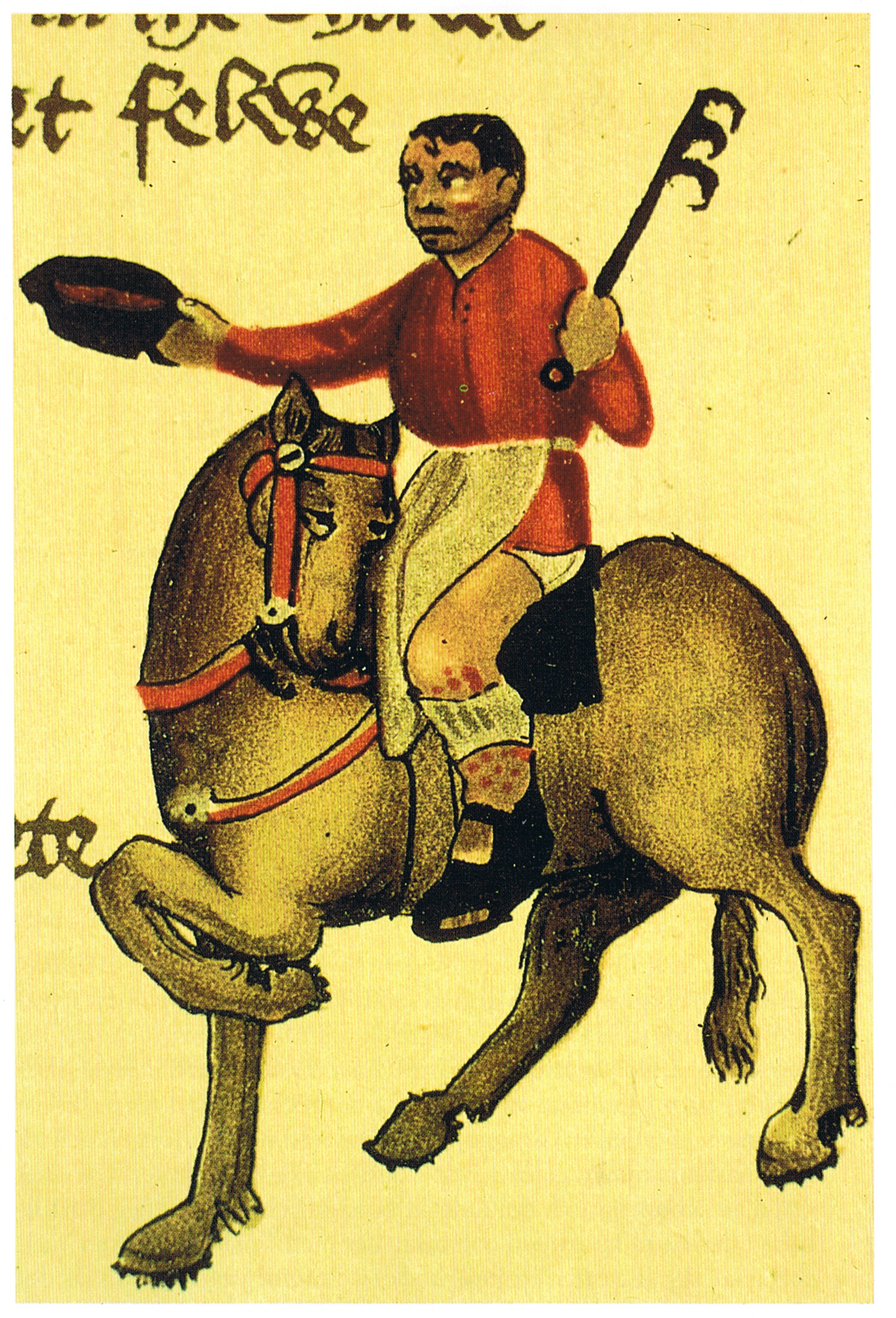
Roger The Cook

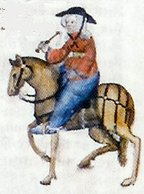
Alison The Wife of Bath

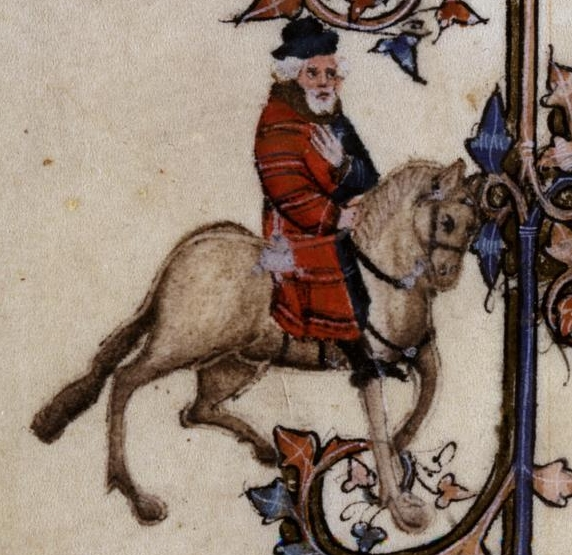
The Franklin

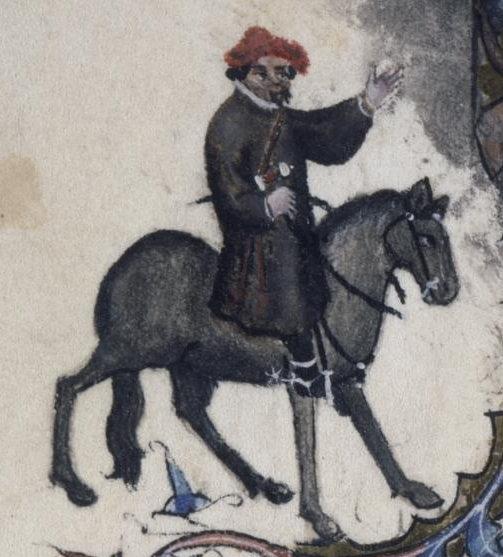
The Shipman

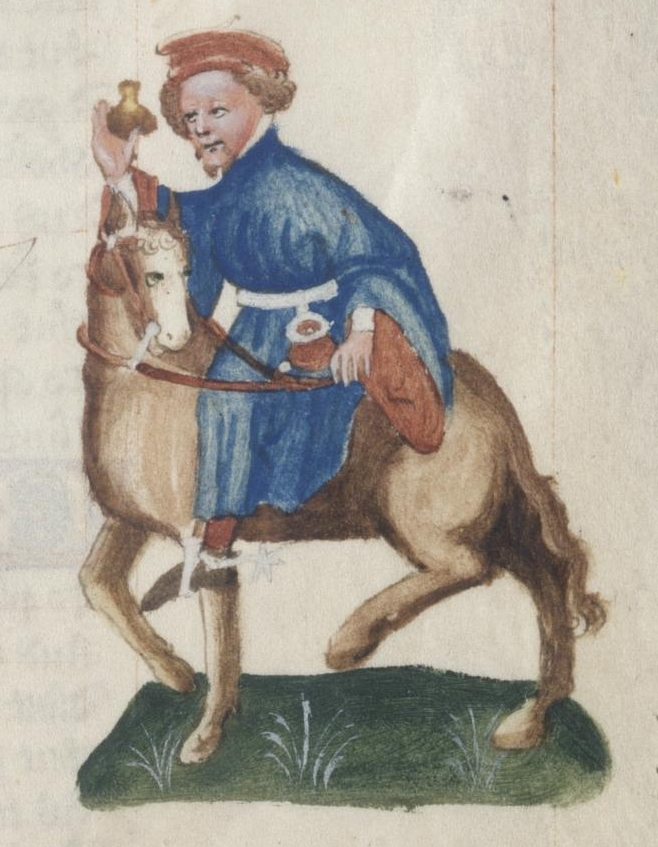
The Manciple

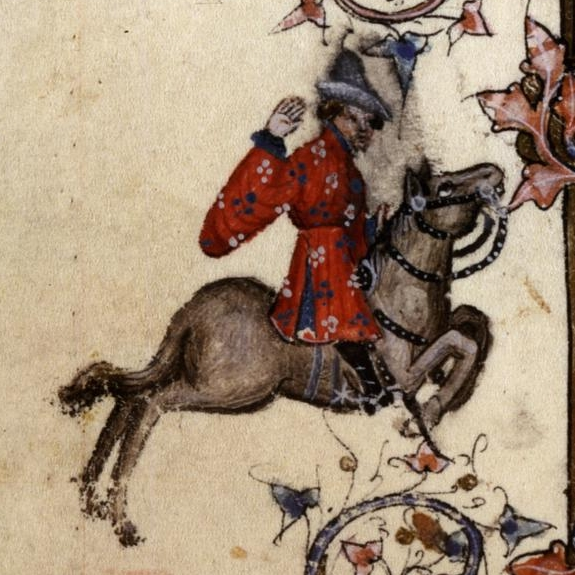
The Merchant

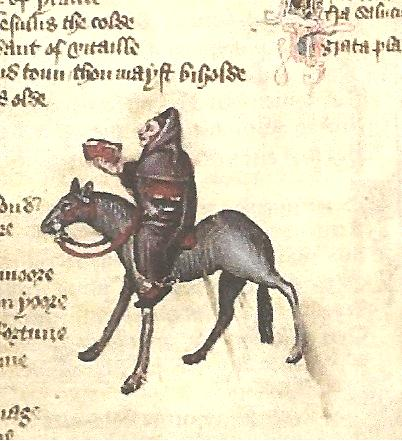
The Clerk of Oxford

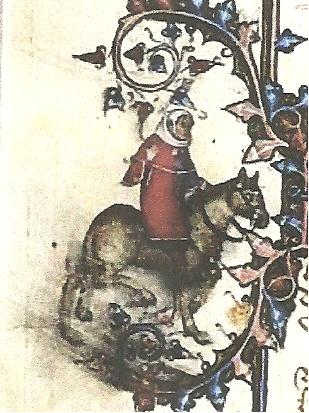
The Sergeant of Law

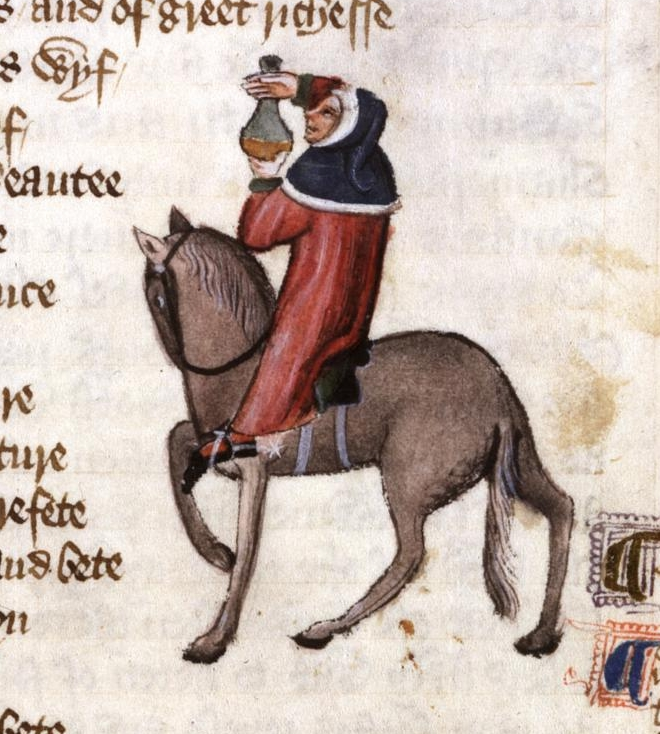
The Physician

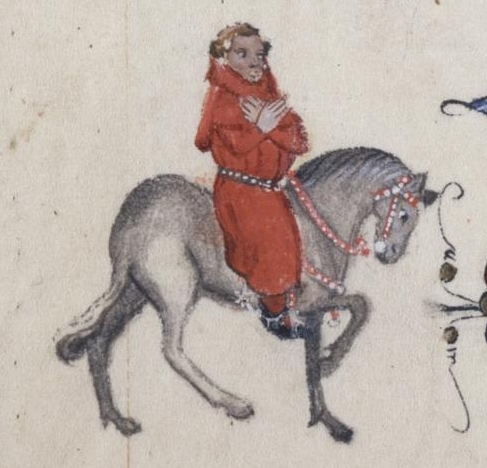
The Parson

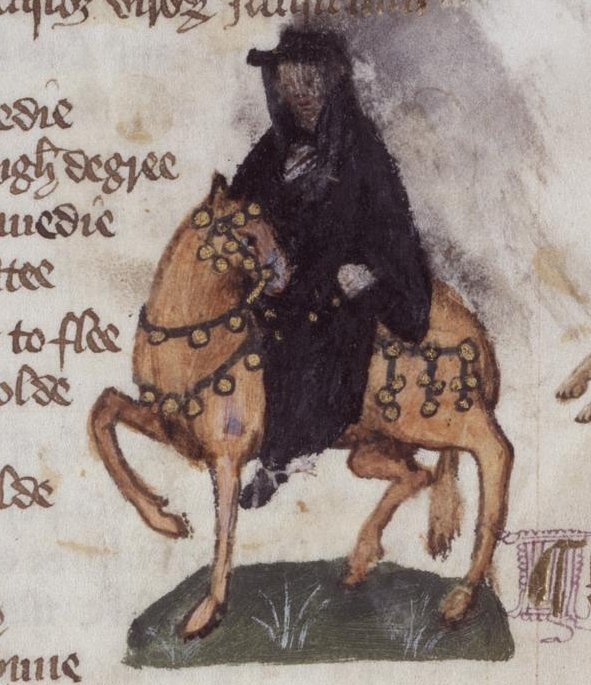
The Monk

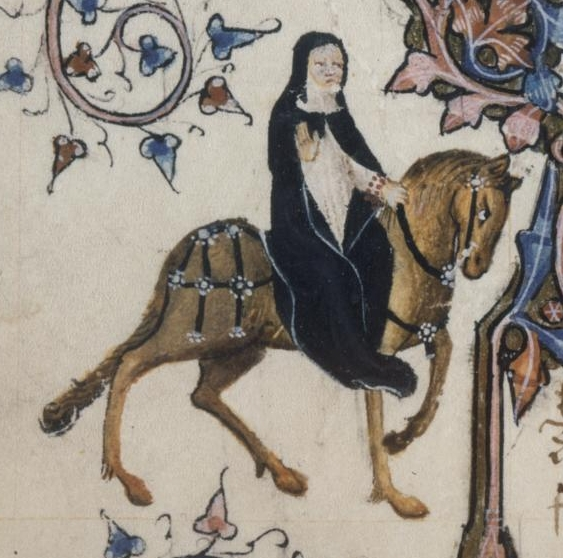
Madame Eglantine The Prioress

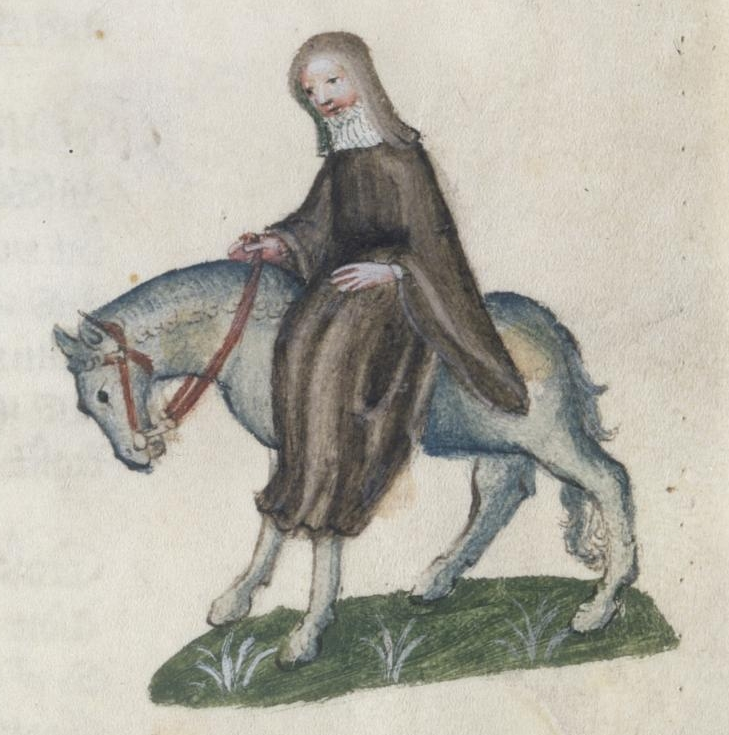
The Second Nun

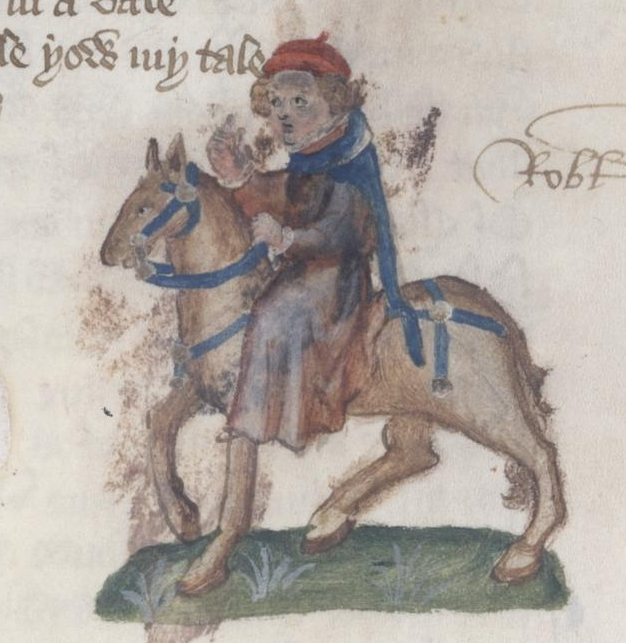
The Nun's Priest

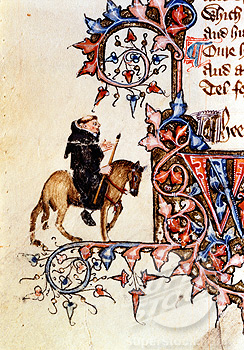
Hubert The Friar

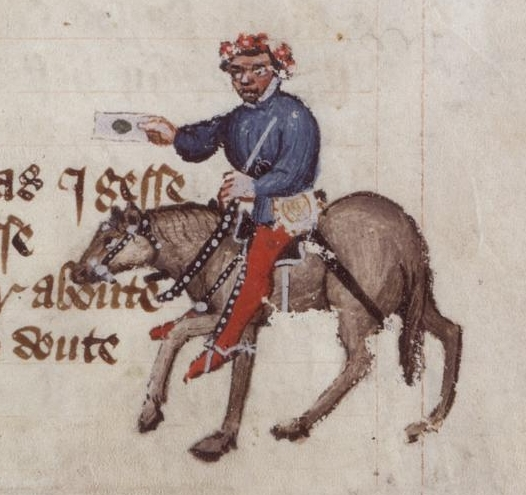
The Summoner

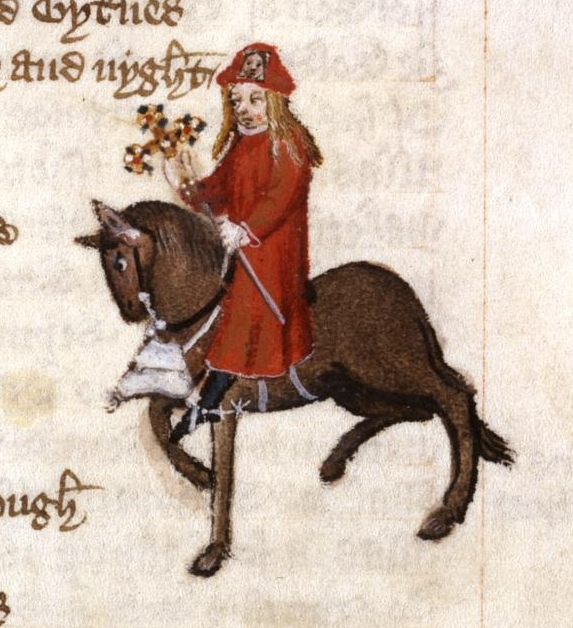
The Pardoner

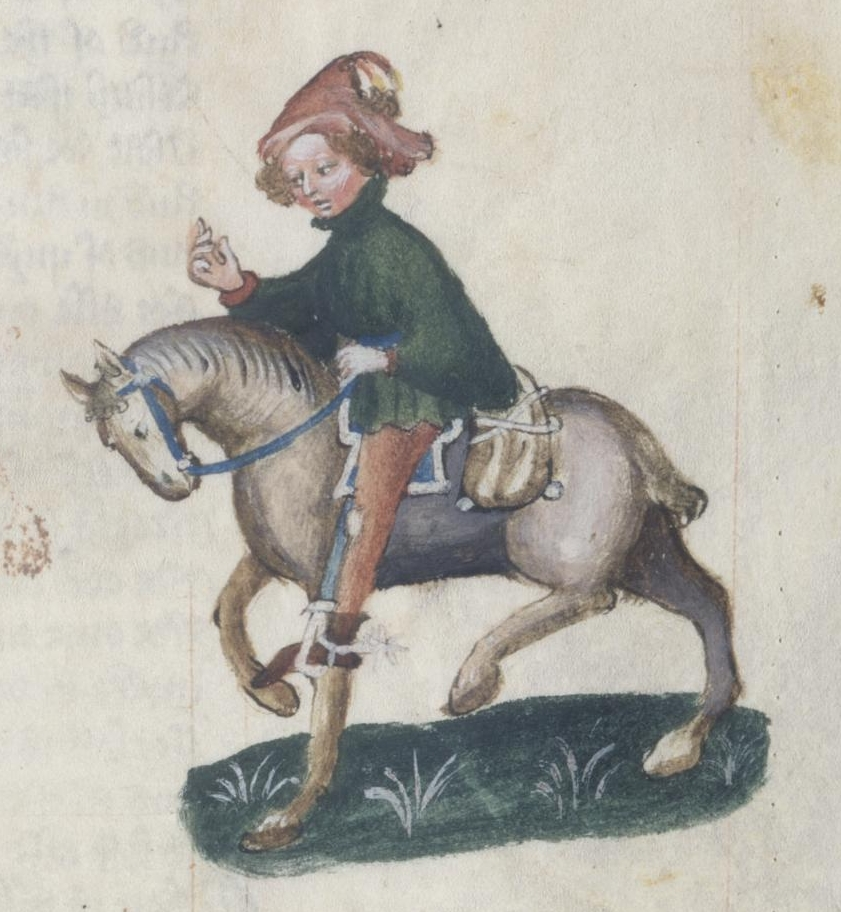
The Canon Yeoman

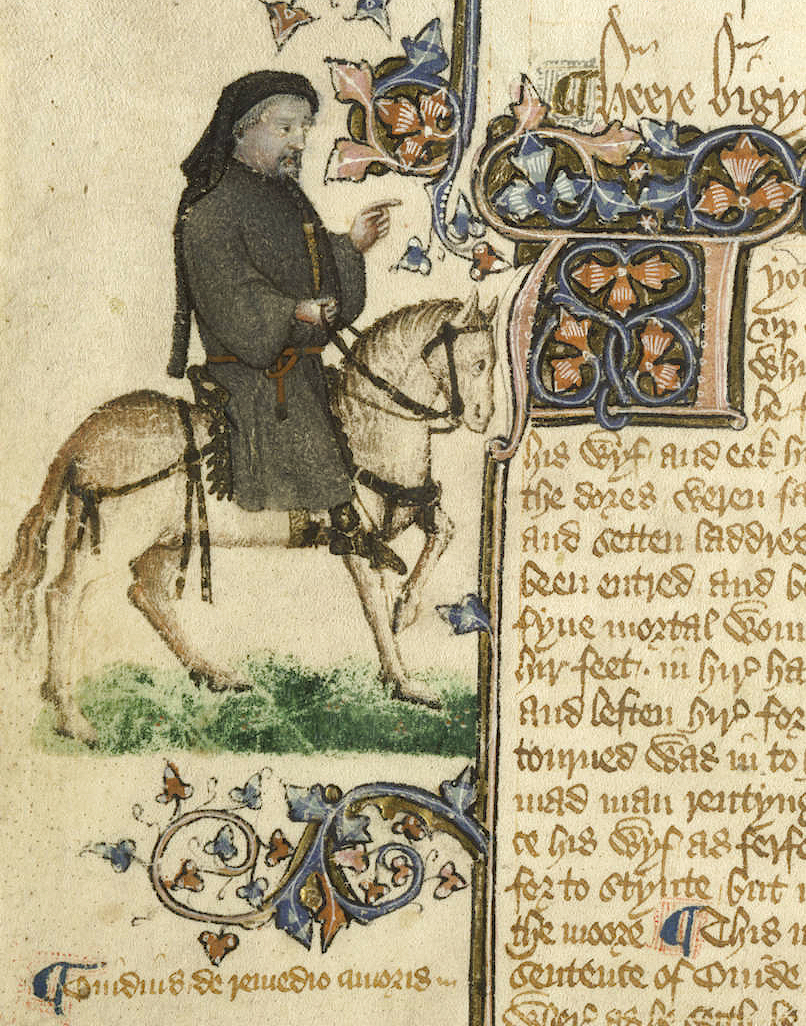
Geoffrey Chaucer

== Bibliography ==
- Bisson, Lillian M. (1998). Chaucer and the Late Medieval World. New York: St. Martin's Press. ISBN 978-0-312-10667-6.
- Cooper, Helen (1996). The Canterbury Tales. Oxford guides to Chaucer (2nd ed.). Oxford: Oxford University Press. ISBN 978-0-19-871155-1.
- Pearsall, Derek Albert (1985). The Canterbury Tales. Unwin critical library. London: G. Allen & Unwin. ISBN 978-0-04-800021-7.
- Alexis P. Rubin, ed. (1993). Scattered Among the Nations: Documents Affecting Jewish History, 49 to 1975. Toronto, ON: Wall & Emerson. ISBN 978-1-895131-10-9.
