= Adam Pinkhurst =

English scribe associated with Chaucer

Adam Pinkhurst is best known as a fourteenth-century English scribe whom Linne Mooney identified as the 'personal scribe' of Geoffrey Chaucer, although much recent scholarship has cast doubt on this connection.

== Biography ==
There are records of an 'Adam Pynkhurst' (as it is usually spelled) from 1355 to 1399–1401. The earliest is a property sale by Pinkhurst, his wife Joanna, and another married couple in Dorking and Betchworth, Surrey; this suggests that he was probably born sometime in the mid-1330s at the latest. In 1370 Pynkhurst was granted a handsome annuity by King Edward III; this record and subsequent ones identify him as a 'King's Archer', that is, a member of an elite group charged with protecting the king. The 1381 Poll Tax records for Bramley, Surrey, record amounts paid some three times what an average person would have been expected to contribute. Records of 1385 pertaining to the purchase and then sale (back to the previous owner) of a property adjoining the church of St. Thomas of Acre refer to 'Adam Pynkhurst, scriptor et civis Londonie' ('scrivener and citizen of London'), the first record of his membership in the Scriveners Company, in whose 'Common Paper' he inscribed his confirmation ca. 1395. The final record, dated sometime from 1399 to 1401, requests the confirmation of grants made by the previous kings to 'Adam Penkhurst'; these pertain to Sussex and Surrey, suggesting his retirement to his original home. There are no records of any 'Adam Pinkhurst' after 1401 or that place him into contact with Geoffrey Chaucer.

== Identification as Chaucer's scribe ==
In 2004, Linne Mooney and Simon Horobin published an essay arguing that the scribe of the Ellesmere Chaucer and Hengwrt Chaucer manuscripts of the Canterbury Tales, known as 'Scribe B', also copied a Piers Plowman manuscript, Cambridge, Trinity College MS B.15.17. At the conference of the New Chaucer Society that year, and in a major essay published in 2006, Mooney identified this scribe as Adam Pinkhurst and claimed, as Bernard Wagner had in 1929, that he was the referent of a short poem known as Chaucer's words unto Adam his scrivener:

Adam scryveyne, if ever thee byfalle
Boece or Troilus for to wryten nuwe,
Under thy longe lokkes thowe most have the scalle,
But after my makyng thowe wryte more truwe,
So offt adaye I mot thy werke renuwe
It to corect, and eke to rubbe and scrape,
And al is thorugh thy necglygence and rape.

[Adam scrivener, if it ever befalls thee to write Boece or Troilus anew, mayst thou have ringworm under thy long locks unless thou writest more truly after my making, so often a day I must renew thy work, to correct it and also to rub and scrape, and all is through thy negligence and haste.]

Mooney took the identification to be 'unmistakable' – she focused on the decorative motifs that adorn both Pinkhurst's entry into the Scriveners Company Common Paper and the Ellesmere Canterbury Tales, calling one of them (two slashes, a dot, two slashes on exaggerated ascenders) his 'signature' – and thus did not mount an argument per se. Her essay also attributed to Pinkhurst the 1387/88 Petitions by the Mercers and the Leathersellers, and some entries in the Mercers' Company Account books from ca. 1392–1427. In 2013 she and Estelle Stubbs claimed that Pinkhurst's hand recorded entries into Letter Book I up to 1410, indicating, they argued, that he had thus been a junior clerk in the Guildhall, working alongside "Scribe D" (whom they identified as a senior clerk, John Marchaunt), another copyist of the Tales. They disavowed Mooney's earlier attribution of the Mercers' account records after 1393 to Pinkhurst, but still claimed that the life-records discussed above, save the ones about the 'scriptor', refer to the scribe's father or uncle. They also identified a 1393 petition on behalf of John Northampton as Pinkhurst's. Meantime, the identification of Pinkhurst as Chaucer's own scribe was accepted almost universally, its deep impact on the field felt well beyond teaching and scholarship: Mooney was fictionalized in Amy Rowland's 2014 novel The Transcriptionist, and Pinkhurst in Bruce Holsinger's 2015 historical thriller The Invention of Fire. Mooney's entry on Pinkhurst for the Oxford Dictionary of National Biography, reserved for 'people who have left their mark on an aspect of national life', was published in 2012.

The first substantial note of dissension appeared in a 2011 essay by Jane Roberts, who, in fact, had first observed the similarity of the Mercers' Petition and the Ellesmere manuscript, word of which reached Mooney, prompting a collaboration during the early stages of the project that would lead to the latter's single-authored essay. Christopher de Hamel likewise expressed scepticism in 2016. In 2018 (building on a 2015 article) Lawrence Warner published the most substantial argument against the identification, claiming that Adam Scryveyne can only be cited as evidence if the question at issue is begged. He further argued that Pinkhurst was in fact scribe of the Piers Plowman manuscript that Horobin and Mooney attributed to Scribe B (i.e., the Hengwrt-Ellesmere scribe), the early entries into the Mercers' account books, and the Northampton petition, but certainly not Hengwrt, Ellesmere, or the 1387/88 petitions, as shown by both paleographical and linguistic evidence. Neither, he proposed, is there any evidence that either Scribe B or Adam Pinkhurst worked in the Guildhall.

== See also ==
- The Canterbury Tales
- Geoffrey Chaucer
- Piers Plowman
