= British Library, Harley MS 7334 =

Harley MS 7334, sometimes known as the Harley Manuscript, is a mediaeval manuscript of Chaucer's Canterbury Tales held in the Harleian Collection of the British Library.

It was formerly used as a base text for modern editions of the Tales, following the examples of Thomas Wright, who used it as the basis for his 1847 edition, and W. W. Skeat, who felt it gave authoritative variant readings.

== Description ==
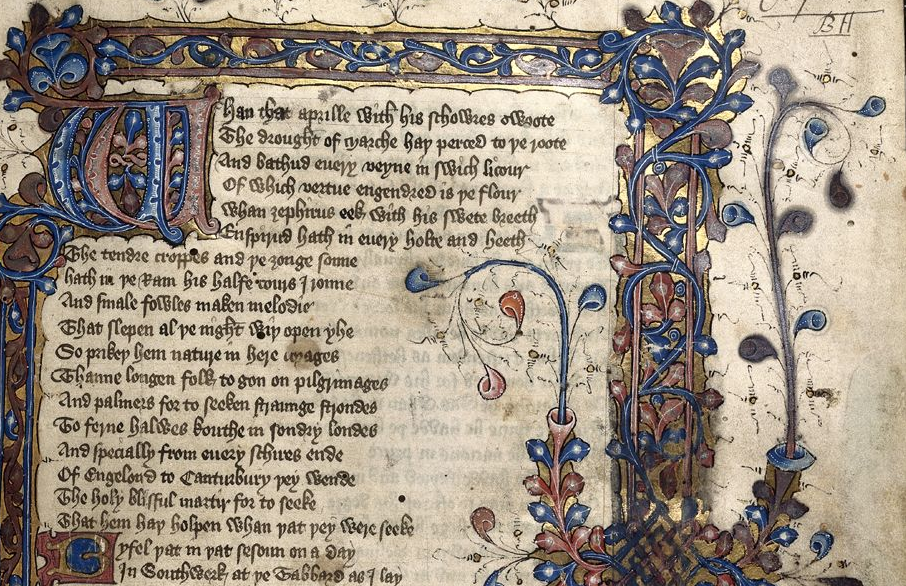
Harley MS. 7334, f. 1, top half.

The Harley MS was likely produced in a London workshop within a decade of Chaucer's death, and is therefore one of the earliest extant Chaucer manuscripts. It has some decoration in red, blue, pink and green, with gold leaf used on borders and initials, and like the Ellesmere Manuscript represents a commission for a wealthy patron (the style of the decoration is very similar to that seen in Ellesmere, perhaps indicating that the same limner worked on both). In the fifteenth century it appears to have been owned by relatives of the Haute family of Ightham Mote.

== Scribe ==
The scribe of Harley MS 7334, conventionally referred to as "Scribe D", is known to have been responsible for several other important manuscripts of the period, including eight copies of the Confessio Amantis of John Gower and one of Piers Plowman. He is also known to be responsible for one other manuscript of the Tales, Corpus Christi College MS. 198, and his work appears in a Gower manuscript alongside that of Adam Pinkhurst, now identified as the scribe of the Ellesmere MS. Scribe D was active in London between the 1390s and 1420s, though his spellings indicate that he was originally from the southwest Midlands. Academic Jeremy Smith has characterised Scribe D as particularly interesting, as his texts display a history in which he moved to London from north Worcestershire, tried hard to eliminate his Worcestershire dialect from his copying, and gradually assimilated peculiar spellings particular to Gower, eventually transplanting them into his work on Chaucer's texts.

== Relation to other manuscripts ==
The Harley MS displays a different tale order to that of other significant manuscripts of the Tales, such as the Ellesmere and Hengwrt manuscripts. As well as the Tale of Gamelyn, now thought not to be by Chaucer, it also contains many peculiar variant readings which were, in the nineteenth century, considered to represent either a first or second draft by the author himself. Modern opinion is that the manuscript's scribe, in common with the practice of the time, would have felt it acceptable to expand or edit the author's text as they thought appropriate. In general, modern editors have agreed with the opinion of Stephen Knight, who noted that while Harley MS 7334 "seems so handsome and authoritative [...] it is in fact heavily and even whimsically edited". However, Scribe D was, in his Gower manuscripts, known to have proceeded in a manner similar to "a photocopier [and] often copied simply what was before him", so it remains possible that the idiosyncratic variant readings might have some other source.

The manuscript is often conventionally referred to as Ha4, following John Manly and Edith Rickert's notation. A facsimile edition of the manuscript has been published.
