= Order of The Canterbury Tales =

The Canterbury Tales is a collection of stories, mostly in verse, written by Geoffrey Chaucer chiefly from 1387 to 1400. They are held together in a frame story of a pilgrimage on which each member of the group is to tell two tales on the way to Canterbury, and two on the way back. Fewer than a quarter of the projected tales were completed before Chaucer's death. It is uncertain in what order Chaucer intended the tales to appear; moreover it is very possible that, as a work-in-progress, no final authorial order of tales ever existed.

Several different orders are evident in the manuscripts of the work; in addition certain orders and structures of the Tales have been proposed by scholars.

== Key ==
The table below enumerates all the pilgrims mentioned in the General Prologue, plus two that materialise later in the tales, and the stories they tell. It also compares the orders in which stories appear in various sources.

- Pilgrim – The designation of each pilgrim in the General Prologue, commonly accepted alternate designation within the name of their Tale, and membership in group of pilgrims if any. The pilgrims' names link to their Tales' articles.
- GP (General Prologue) – This column lists the order in which each character is mentioned in the General Prologue.

Scholarly arrangements

- Tyr (Tyrwhitt's Fragments) – Thomas Tyrwhitt, editor of the first modern edition of The Canterbury Tales (1775–78) accepted the order of the Ellesmere manuscript, and furthermore determined – primarily based on linkages in the Tales' Prologues – which tales were "inseparably linked" to each other; this resulted in his postulating 10 Fragments, each of which is seen as an authorially integral narrative unit, but with no certain indication of what is to come before or after. This structure has remained influential, and is the arrangement followed in the Riverside Chaucer (3rd ed.). (To sort the table by Tyrwhitt's order, use the Ellesmere column.)
- CS (Chaucer Society's Groups) – Using Tyrwhitt's foundation, Henry Bradshaw rearranged some Fragments, largely with the goal of constructing the most plausible itinerary for the pilgrims based on clues of time and location in the text. The "Bradshaw shift" results in Groups A-I. This arrangement was embraced by Frederick James Furnivall and the Chaucer Society, as well as Walter William Skeat and others.
- FGF — F. G. Fleay proposed this ordering in "Some Folk-Lore from Chaucer" (1879).

Manuscripts: Over 80 manuscripts containing all or part of The Canterbury Tales exist. The six tabulated below represent the four main orders (El, Cx, La, Pw) in which tales appear in the manuscripts, plus two significant anomalous arrangements (Hg, Ha). All manuscript orders (except Hg*) were collated by Furnivall.

- El (Ellesmere 26 C 9, the Ellesmere manuscript) – A deluxe illuminated manuscript, probably made within 20 years of Chaucer's death.
- Hg (Hengwrt 154 (Peniarth 392D), the Hengwrt manuscript) – Probably the oldest surviving manuscript and, since the mid-20th century, considered the most important.
- Hg* Manly & Rickert argue that some time after Hengwrt was copied, leaves from the back of the manuscript were mistakenly moved to the middle, and the manuscript was bound – and remains today – in this mistaken order. This column shows the presumed original order.
- Cx (Caxton's editio princeps) – The earliest printed edition of The Canterbury Tales (1478), it is typically accorded manuscript status, as it is based on a now-lost manuscript.
- La (Lansdowne 851)
- Pw (Petworth House MS 7)
- Ha (Harley MS. 7334)

== Table ==
(+G = Manuscript includes the non-Chaucerian Tale of Gamelyn after the Cook's initial abortive attempt to tell a tale.)

Pilgrim	GP	Tyr	CS	FGF	El	Hg	Hg*	Cx	La	Pw	Ha
Knight	1	I.2	A.2	2	2	2	2	2	2	2	2
Squire (Knight's son)	2	V.1	F.1	15	12	13	10	7	7	9	12
Yeoman (Knight's servant)	3										
Prioress	4	VII.2	B^{2}.2	10	17	21	18	19	19	7	19
Nun "Second Nun" (with Prioress)	5	VIII.1	G.1	22	22	16	13	14	14	16	14
Priest "Nun's Priest" (with Prioress)	6	VII.6	B^{2}.6	14	21	10	22	23	23	23	23
Second Priest (with Prioress)	7										
Third Priest (with Prioress)	8										
Monk	9	VII.5	B^{2}.5	13	20	9	21	22	22	22	22
Friar	10	III.2	D.2	18	8	7	7	10	9	12	8
Merchant	11	IV.2	E.2	21	11	14	11	8	12	10	11
Clerk	12	IV.1	E.1	20	10	17	14	12	11	14	10
Sergeant of Law "Man of Law"	13	II	B^{1}	8	6	12	9	6	6	8	6
Franklin	14	V.2	F.2	16	13	15	12	13	13	15	13
Haberdasher (guildsman)	15										
Carpenter (guildsman)	16										
Weaver (guildsman)	17										
Dyer (guildsman)	18										
Tapestry Weaver (guildsman)	19										
Cook (with guildsmen)	20	I.5	A.5	5	5	5	5	5	5 +G	5 +G	5 +G
Shipman	21	VII.1	B^{2}.1	9	16	20	17	18	18	6	18
Doctor of Physic "Physician"	22	VI.1	C.1	6	14	18	15	16	16	18	16
Wife of Bath	23	III.1	D.1	17	7	6	6	9	8	11	7
Parson	24	X.1	I.1	25	25	24	24	25	25	25	25
Plowman (brother of Parson)	25										
Reeve	26	I.4	A.4	4	4	4	4	4	4	4	4
Miller	27	I.3	A.3	3	3	3	3	3	3	3	3
Summoner	28	III.3	D.3	19	9	8	8	11	10	13	9
Pardoner (with Summoner)	29	VI.2	C.2	7	15	19	16	17	17	19	17
Manciple	30	IX	H	24	24	11	23	24	24	24	24
"Chaucer" (General Prologue)	31	I.1	A.1	1	1	1	1	1	1	1	1
"Chaucer" (Sir Thopas)	31	VII.3	B^{2}.3	11	18	22	19	20	20	20	20
"Chaucer" (The Tale of Melibee)	31	VII.4	B^{2}.4	12	19	23	20	21	21	21	21
"Chaucer" (Chaucer's Retraction)	31	X.2	I.2	-	26	-	-	26	26	26	26
Our Host	32										
Canon's Yeoman	-	VIII.2	G.2	23	23	-	-	15	15	17	15
Canon	-										
