= List of The Canterbury Tales characters =

The Pilgrims in The Canterbury Tales by Geoffrey Chaucer are the main characters in the framing narrative of the book.

In addition, they can be considered as characters of the framing narrative the Host, who travels with the pilgrims, the Canon, and the fictive Geoffrey Chaucer, the teller of the tale of Sir Thopas (who might be considered distinct from the Chaucerian narrator, who is in turn somewhat divorced from Chaucer the author).

== Groupings ==
The pilgrims fall into various groups, the religious group and the military group for example.

Also there are important pairs, including the tale pairs - which pair are supposed to be telling their tales on the same night.

== Pilgrims and other travelers ==
Role	Name	Tales	Notes
Narrator	Geoffrey Chaucer	Sir Thopas and the Tale of Melibee	Although he writes all of the tales, Chaucer describes himself telling two tales as one of the pilgrims.
Host	Harry Bailey		Owner of the Tabard Inn, where the pilgrimage starts. He agrees to travel on the pilgrimage, promising to judge the tales, and disputes between the pilgrims.
Knight		The Knight's Tale	A valiant and experienced crusader who lives by the code of chivalry
Squire		The Squire's Tale	Son of the knight, a finely dressed and artistically talented bachelor
Knight's yeoman			An archer and possibly a forester
Prioress	Madame Eglantine	The Prioress's Tale	A woman with impeccable table manners who wears a brooch reading Amor vincit omnia (love conquers all)
Second nun		The Second Nun's Tale	Chaplain to the prioress
Nun's priests		The Nun's Priest's Tale	Three priests in the prioress's party
Monk		The Monk's Tale	An avid hunter and horseman who disdains the rules of his order
Friar	Huberd	The Friar's Tale	A mendicant who takes confessions from the well-to-do for a price, and spends the money on himself rather than to benefit the poor
Merchant		The Merchant's Tale	A seemingly successful Hanseatic trader who is deeply in debt
Clerk		The Clerk's Tale	An Oxford-educated scholar
Man of law (sergeant of the law)		The Man of Law's Tale	A wealthy lawyer known as much for his personal extravagance as for his professional skill
Franklin		The Franklin's Tale	Companion of the man of law, a pleasure-seeking landowner who dines on every kind of food and drink
Five craft workers			A haberdasher, carpenter, weaver, dyer and tapester, all described together
Cook	Roger	The Cook's Tale	A servant of the craft-workers
Shipman		The Shipman's Tale	A barge captain from Dartmouth
Physician (doctor of physic)		The Physician's Tale	A practitioner of astrology and humorism
Wife of Bath	Alisoun	The Wife of Bath's Tale	A five-time widow who has traveled throughout the world
Parson		The Parson's Tale	A benevolent and virtuous town pastor
Plowman			The parson's brother, who loves God and his neighbor and plows poor men's fields for free
Miller	Robyn	The Miller's Tale	A brawny and profane tradesman who overcharges and steals from his customers
Manciple		The Manciple's Tale	A purchasing agent to an Inn of Court
Reeve	Osewald	The Reeve's Tale	A feudal accountant from Bawdeswell
Summoner		The Summoner's Tale	A gluttonous, lecherous, intemperate man who notifies people to appear at ecclesiastical courts
Pardoner		The Pardoner's Tale	A close companion of the summoner who sells indulgences and phony religious relics
Canon			An alchemist and confidence trickster who encounters the pilgrims on the road, then rides away when his yeoman speaks too freely
Canon's yeoman		The Canon's Yeoman's Tale	Unwitting accomplice of the canon
