= General Prologue =

First part of "The Canterbury Tales"

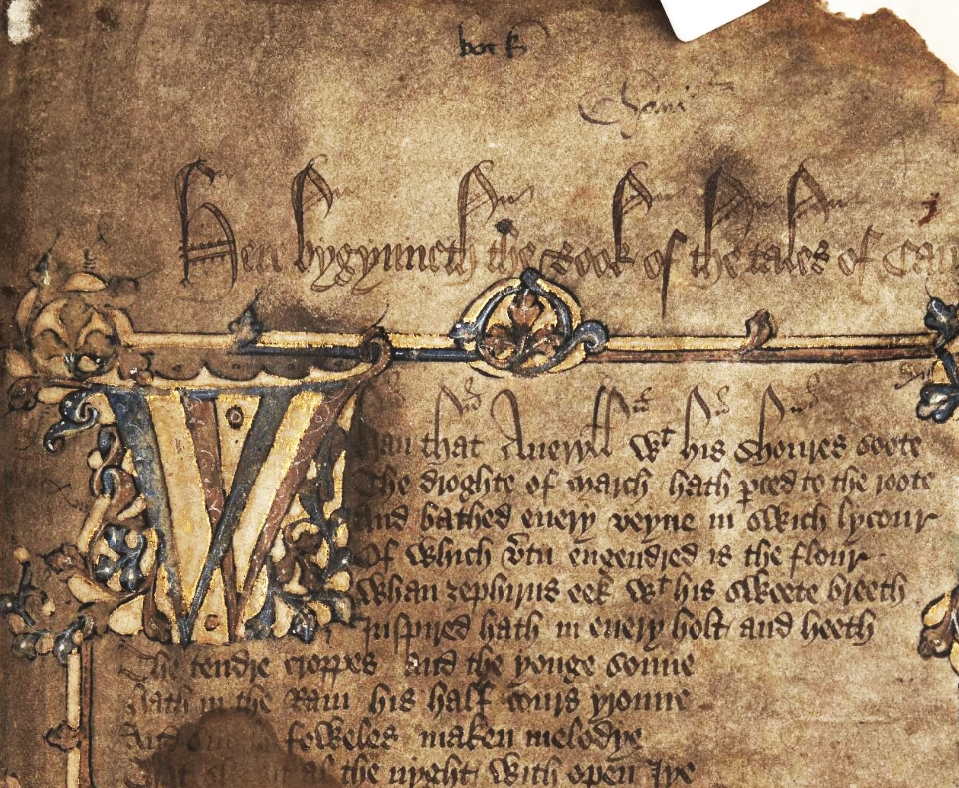
The first lines from the General Prologue at the opening folio of the Hengwrt manuscript

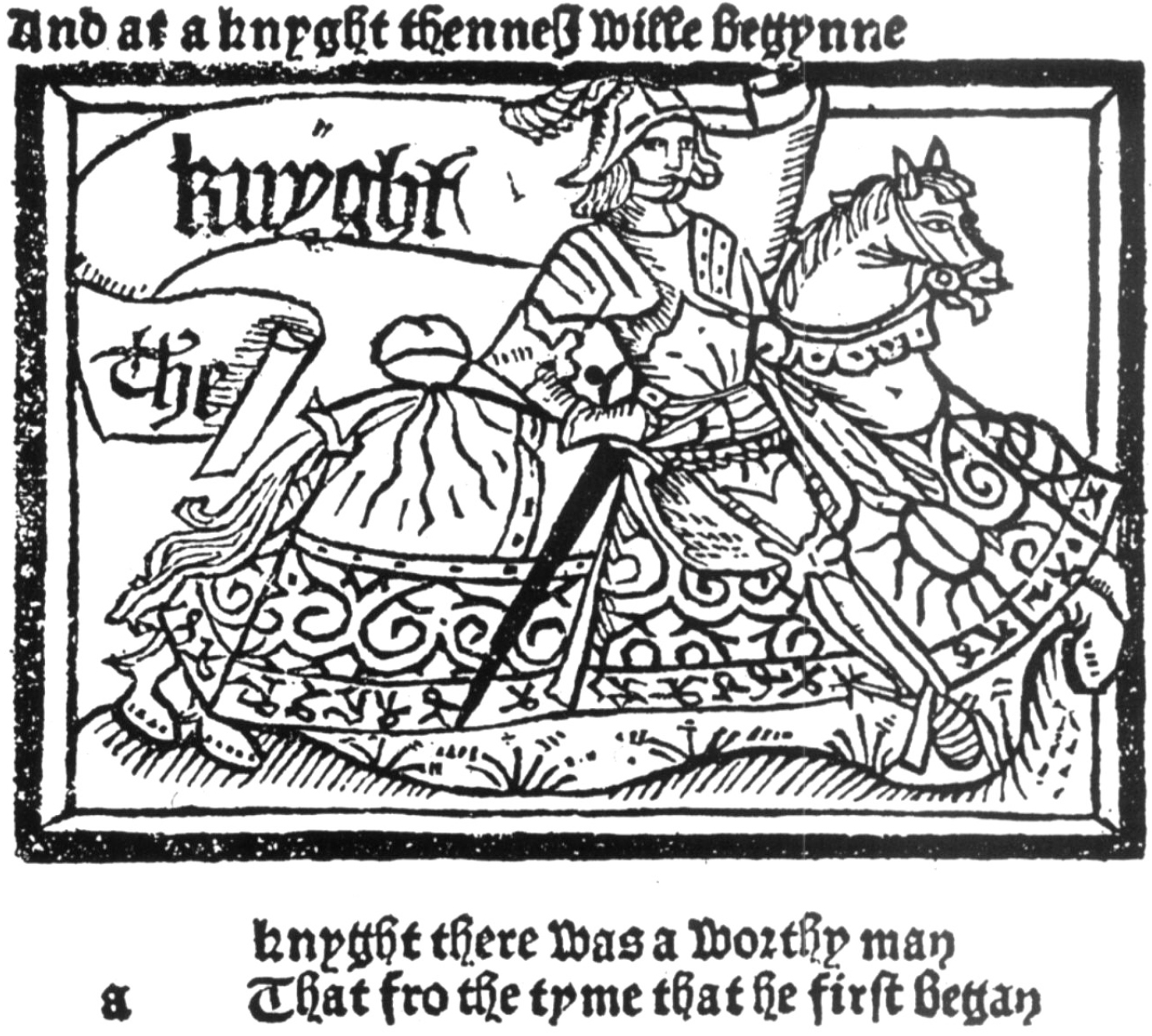
Illustration of the knight from the General Prologue. Three lines of text are also shown.

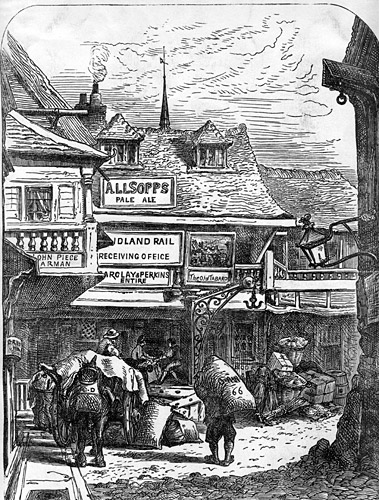
The Tabard Inn, Southwark, around 1850

The "General Prologue" is the first part of The Canterbury Tales by Geoffrey Chaucer. It introduces the frame story, in which a group of pilgrims travelling to the shrine of Thomas Becket in Canterbury agree to take part in a storytelling competition, and describes the pilgrims themselves. The Prologue is arguably the most familiar section of The Canterbury Tales, depicting traffic between places, languages and cultures, as well as introducing and describing the pilgrims who will narrate the tales.

== Synopsis ==
The frame story of the poem, as set out in the 858 lines of Middle English which make up the General Prologue, is of a religious pilgrimage. The narrator, Geoffrey Chaucer, is in The Tabard Inn in Southwark, where he meets a group of 'sundry folk' who are all on the way to Canterbury, the site of the shrine of Saint Thomas Becket, a martyr reputed to have the power of healing the sinful.

The setting is April, and the prologue starts by singing the praises of that month whose rains and warm western wind restore life and fertility to the earth and its inhabitants. This abundance of life, the narrator says, prompts people to go on pilgrimages; in England, the goal of such pilgrimages is the shrine of Thomas Becket. The narrator falls in with a group of pilgrims, and the largest part of the prologue is taken up by a description of them; Chaucer seeks to describe their 'condition', their 'array', and their social 'degree'. The narrator expresses admiration and praise towards the pilgrims' abilities.

The pilgrims include a knight; his son, a squire; the knight's yeoman; a prioress, accompanied by a nun and the nun's priest; a monk; a friar; a merchant; a clerk; a sergeant of law; a franklin; a haberdasher; a carpenter; a weaver; a dyer; a tapestry weaver; a cook; a shipman; a doctor of physic; a wife of Bath; a parson and his brother, a plowman; a miller; a manciple; a reeve; a summoner; a pardoner; the Host (a man called Harry Bailey); and Chaucer himself. At the end of this section, the Host proposes that the group ride together and entertain one another with stories. He lays out his plan: each pilgrim will tell two stories on the way to Canterbury and two on the way back. Whoever has told the most meaningful and comforting stories, with "the best sentence and moost solaas" (line 798) will receive a free meal paid for by the rest of the pilgrims upon their return. The company agrees and makes the Host its governor, judge, and record keeper. They set off the next morning and draw straws to determine who will tell the first tale. The Knight wins and prepares to tell his tale.

== Structure ==
The General Prologue establishes the frame for the Tales as a whole (or of the intended whole) and introduces the characters/storytellers. These are introduced in the order of their rank in accordance with the three medieval social estates (clergy, nobility, and commoners and peasantry). These characters are also representative of their estates and models with which the others in the same estate can be compared and contrasted.

The structure of the General Prologue is also intimately linked with the narrative style of the tales. As the narrative voice has been under critical scrutiny for some time, so too has the identity of the narrator himself. Though fierce debate has taken place on both sides, (mostly contesting that the narrator either is, or is not, Geoffrey Chaucer), most contemporary scholars believe that the narrator is meant to be Chaucer himself to some degree. Some scholars, like William W. Lawrence, claim that the narrator is Geoffrey Chaucer in person. Others, like Marchette Chute for instance, contest that the narrator is instead a literary creation like the other pilgrims in the tales.

Chaucer makes use of his extensive literary and linguistic knowledge in the General Prologue by interplaying Latin, French, and English words against each other. French was considered a hierarchal, courtly, and aristocratic language during the Middle Ages, whereas Latin was the language of learning. The opening lines of The Canterbury Tales show a diversity of phrasing by including words of French origin like "droghte," "veyne," and "licour" alongside English terms for nature: "roote," "holt and heeth," and "croppes."

== Sources ==
John Matthews Manly attempted to identify pilgrims with real fourteenth-century people. In some instances, such as the Summoner and the Friar, he attempts localization to a small geographic area. The Man of Law is identified as Thomas Pynchbek (also Pynchbeck), who was chief baron of the exchequer. Sir John Bussy, an associate of Pynchbek, is identified as the Franklin. The Pembroke estates near Baldeswelle supplied the portrait for the unnamed Reeve.

Sebastian Sobecki argues that the General Prologue is a pastiche of the historical Harry Bailey's surviving 1381 poll-tax account of Southwark's inhabitants.

Jill Mann argued that the descriptions of pilgrims representing a spectrum of social roles is best understood as standing in the tradition of medieval Estate satire. Stephen Rigby observed the General Prologue as commenting on medieval social inequality, noting that Chaucerians are divided in their interpretations of Chaucer's outlook: some see Chaucer as defending the social order; others argue that he meant to criticize it; and others still hold that he intended to leave it open to the reader's interpretation. On such interpretations, the pilgrims are less likely to correspond to historical individuals and more likely to be versions of representative 'types': the friar, for example, being a figure out of existing anti-fraternal literature.

== Translation ==
The following are the first 18 lines of the General Prologue. The text was written in a dialect associated with London and spellings associated with the then-emergent Chancery Standard.

First 18 lines of the General Prologue
Original in Middle English:	Word-for-word translation into Modern English	Sense-for-sense translation into Modern English with a new rhyme scheme (by Nevill Coghill)
Whan that Aprill, with his shoures soote	When [that] April with his showers sweet	When in April the sweet showers fall
The droghte of March hath perced to the roote	The drought of March has pierced to the root	And pierce the drought of March to the root, and all
And bathed every veyne in swich licour,	And bathed every vein in such liquor,	The veins are bathed in liquor of such power
Of which vertu engendred is the flour;	Of whose virtue engendered is the flower;	As brings about the engendering of the flower,
Whan Zephirus eek with his sweete breeth	When Zephyrus eke with his sweet breath	When also Zephyrus with his sweet breath
Inspired hath in every holt and heeth	Has inspired in every holt and heath,	Exhales an air in every grove and heath
The tendre croppes, and the yonge sonne	The tender crops; and the young sun	Upon the tender shoots, and the young sun
Hath in the Ram his halfe cours yronne,	Has in the Ram his half-course run,	His half course in the sign of the Ram has run
And smale foweles maken melodye,	And small fowls make melody,	And the small fowl are making melody
That slepen al the nyght with open eye	That sleep all the night with open eye	That sleep away the night with open eye,
(So priketh hem Nature in hir corages);	(So Nature pricks them in their courages);	(So nature pricks them and their heart engages)
Thanne longen folk to goon on pilgrimages	Then folks long to go on pilgrimages	Then folk long to go on pilgrimages,
And palmeres for to seken straunge strondes	And palmers [for] to seek strange strands	And palmers long to seek the stranger strands
To ferne halwes, kowthe in sondry londes;	To far-off hallows, couth in sundry lands;	Of far off saints, hallowed in sundry lands,
And specially from every shires ende	And, specially, from every shire's end	And specially from every shires' end
Of Engelond, to Caunterbury they wende,	Of England, to Canterbury they wend,	Of England, down to Canterbury they wend
The hooly blisful martir for to seke	The holy blissful martyr [for] to seek	The holy blissful martyr, quick
That hem hath holpen, whan that they were seeke.	That has helped them when [that] they were sick.	To give his help to them when they were sick.

In modern prose:

When April with its sweet showers has pierced March's drought to the root, bathing every vein in such liquid by whose virtue the flower is engendered, and when Zephyrus with his sweet breath has also enlivened the tender plants in every wood and field, and the young sun is halfway through Aries, and small birds that sleep all night with an open eye make melodies (their hearts so goaded by Nature), then people long to go on pilgrimages, and palmers seek faraway shores and distant saints known in sundry lands, and especially they make their way to Canterbury from every shire of England to seek the holy blessed martyr, who helped them when they were ill.

== Gallery of the pilgrims ==
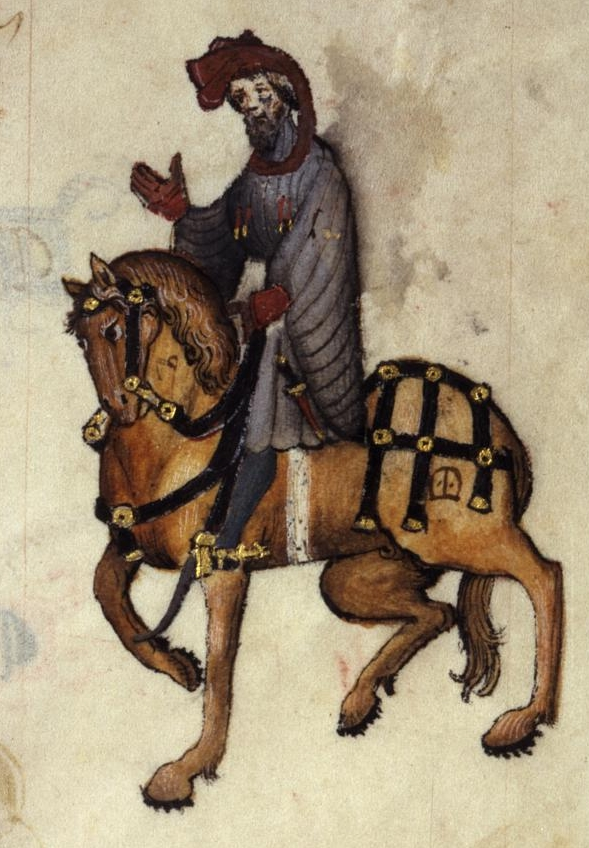
The Knight

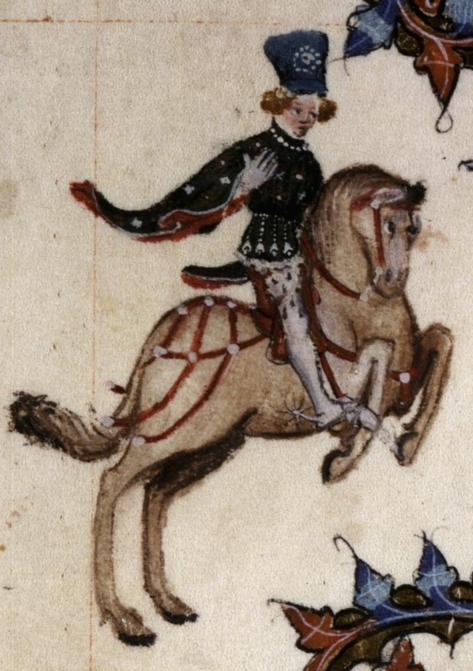
The Squire

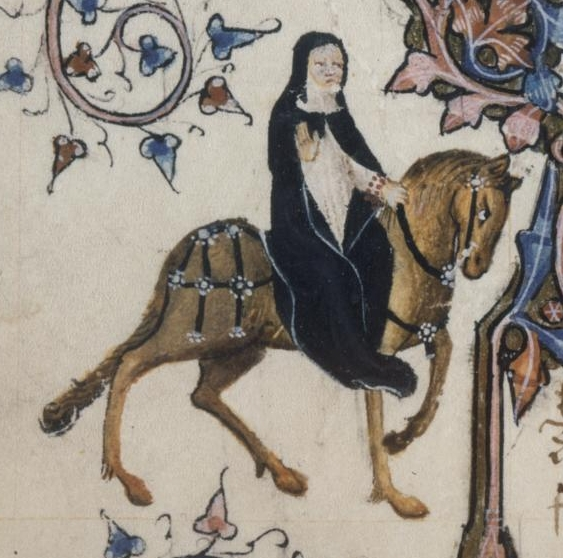
The Prioress

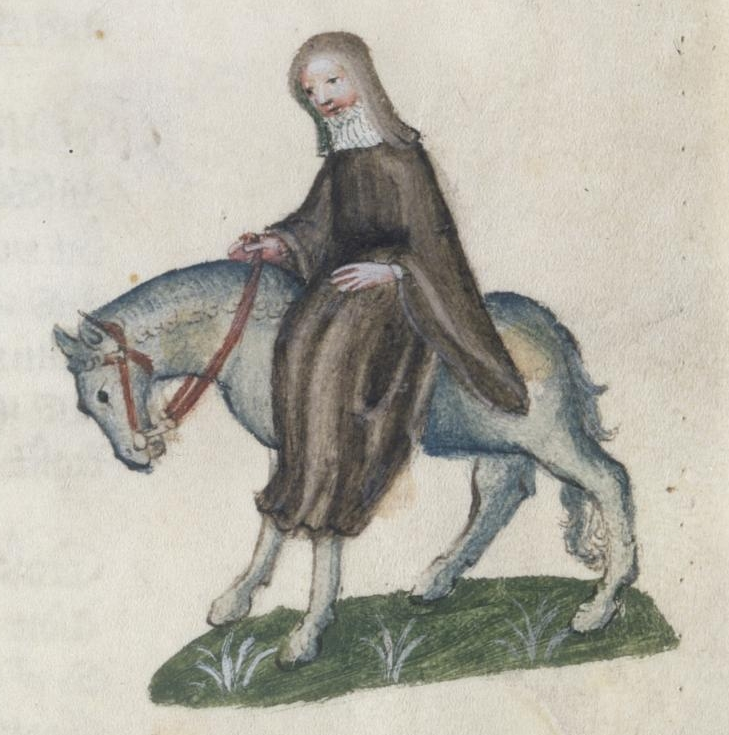
The Second Nun

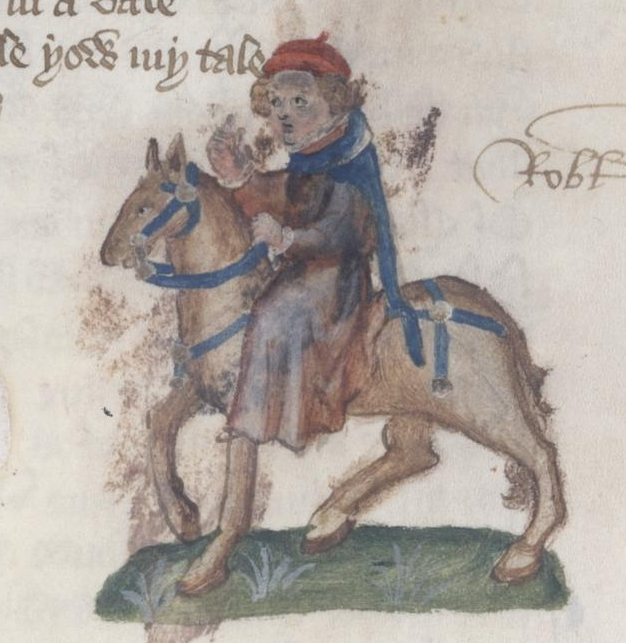
The Nun's Priest

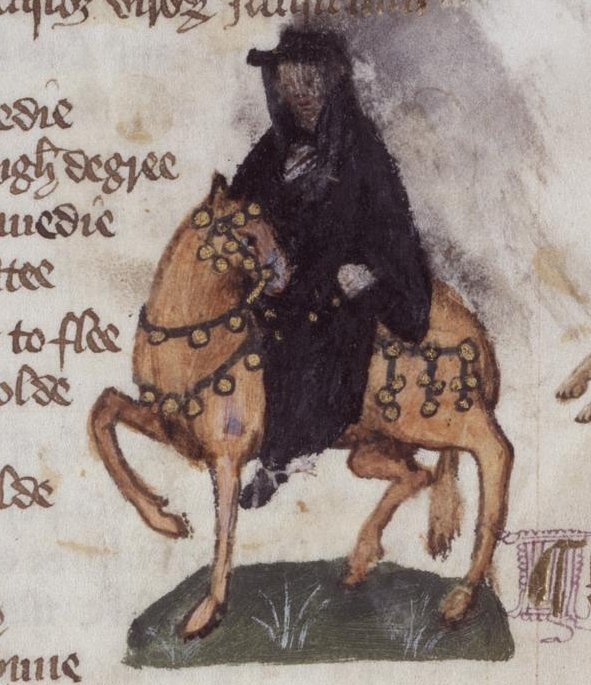
The Monk

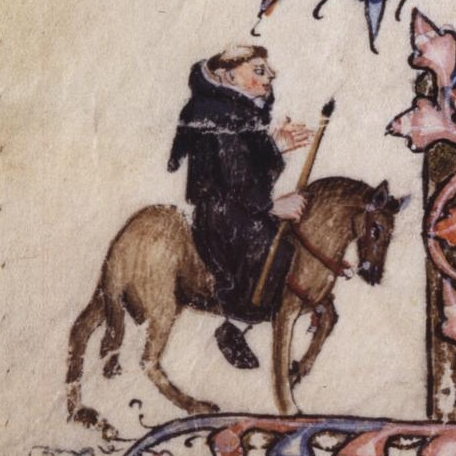
The Friar

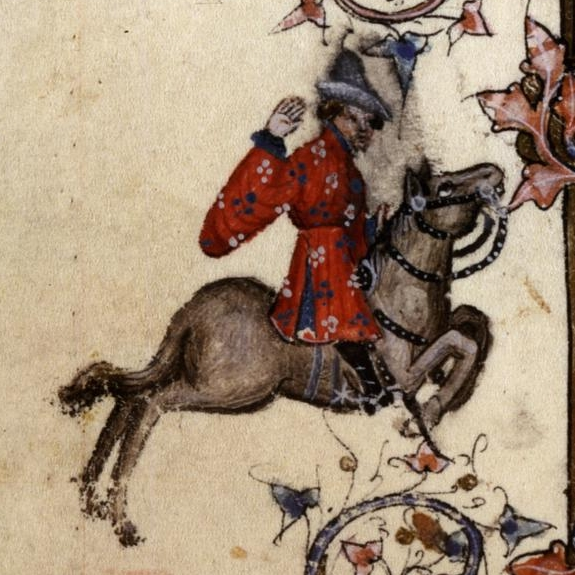
The Merchant

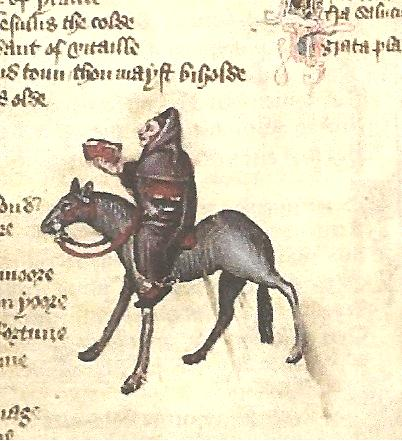
The Clerk of Oxford

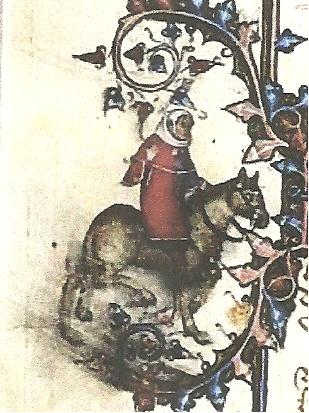
The Sergeant of Law

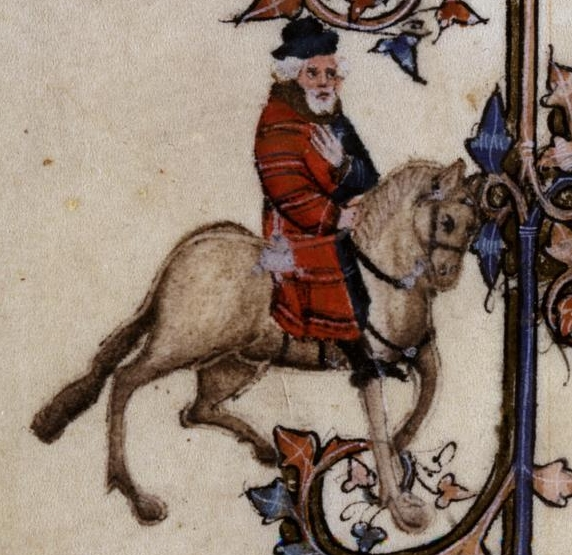
The Franklin

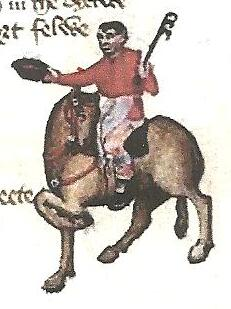
The Cook

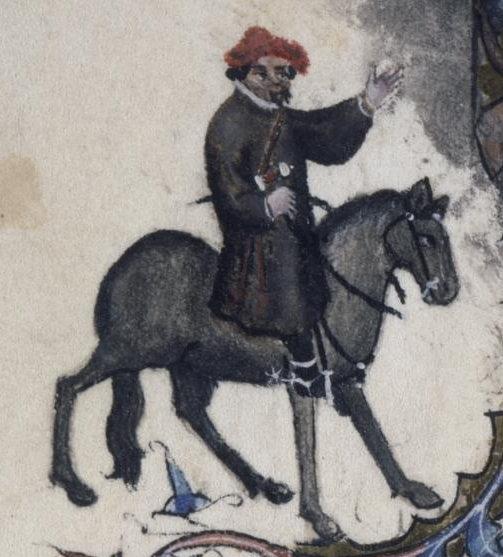
The Shipman

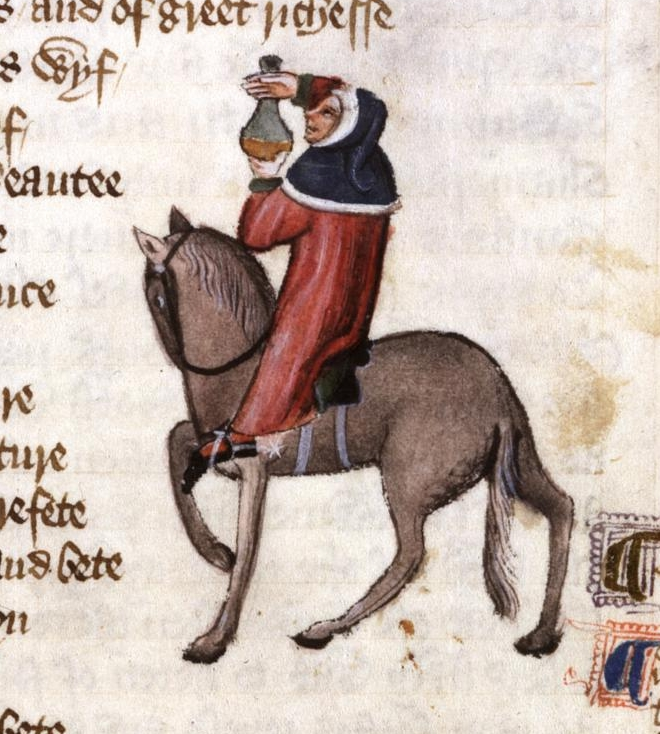
The Physician

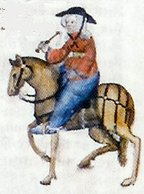
The Wife of Bath

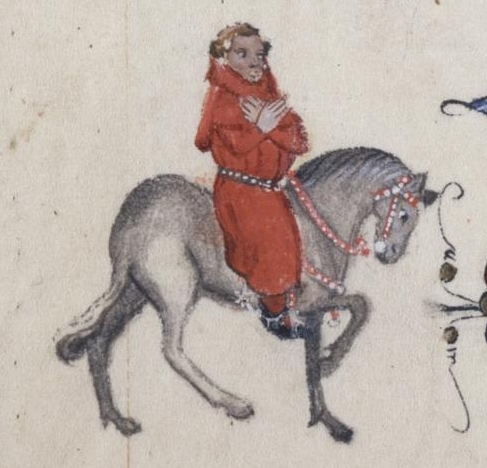
The Parson

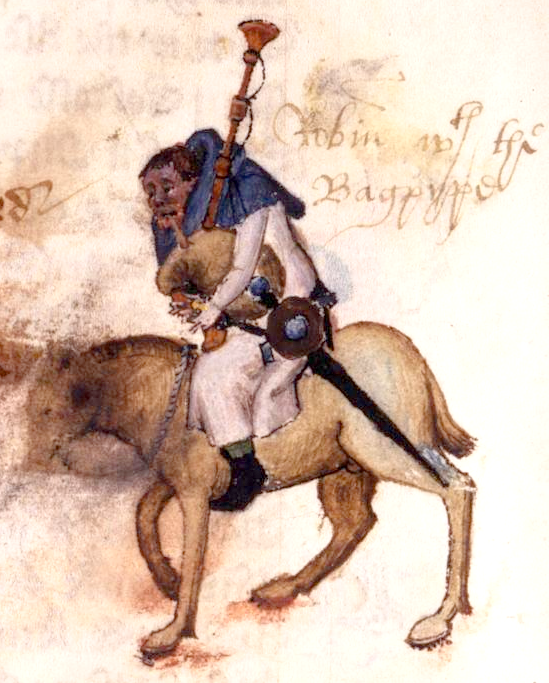
The Miller

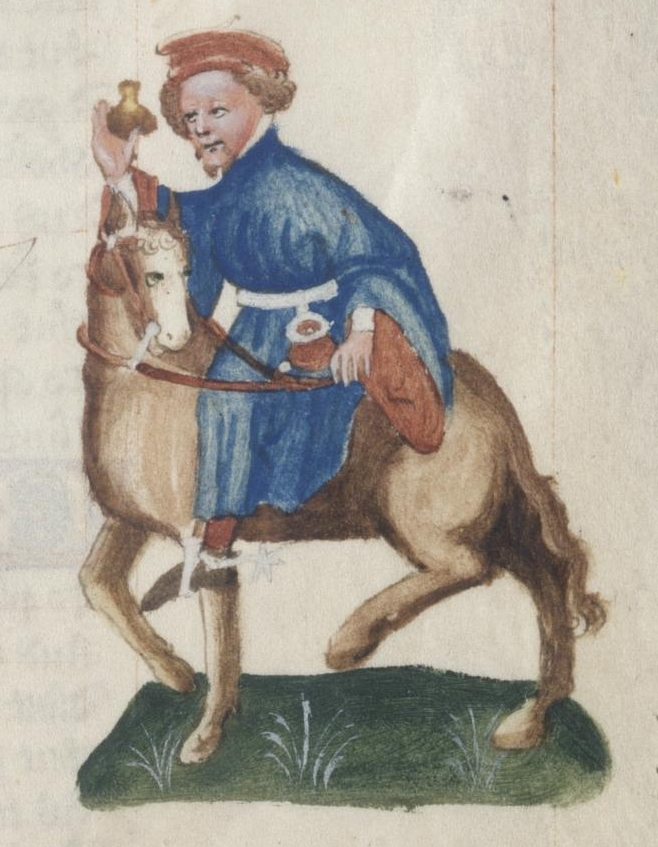
The Manciple

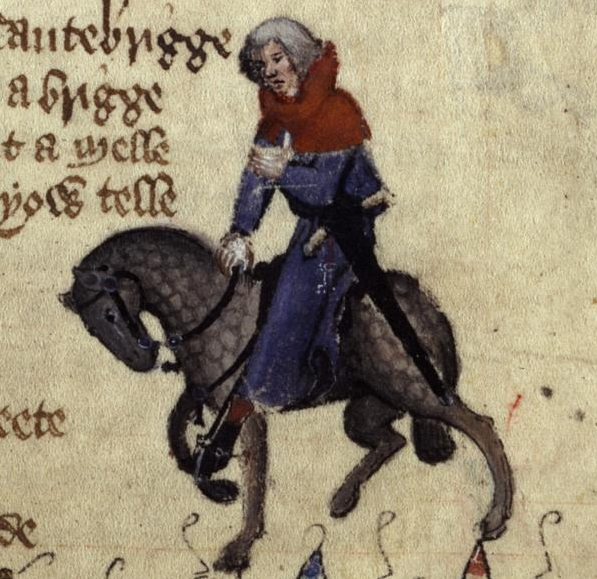
The Reeve

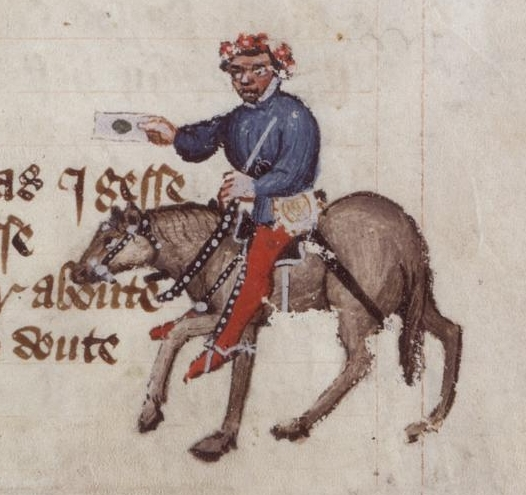
The Summoner

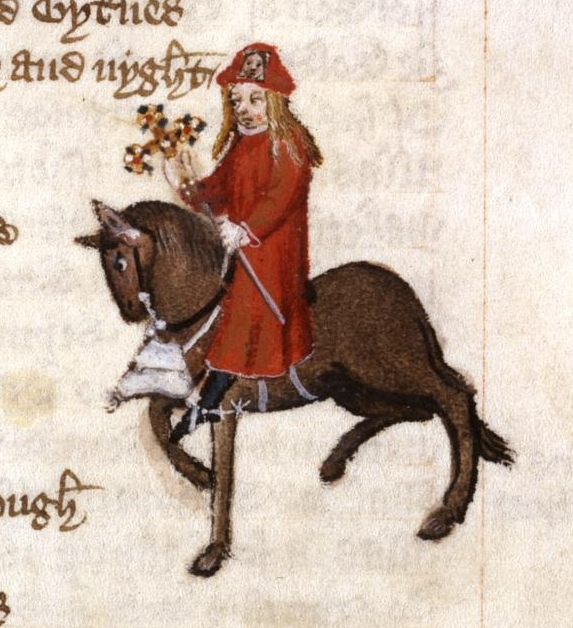
The Pardoner

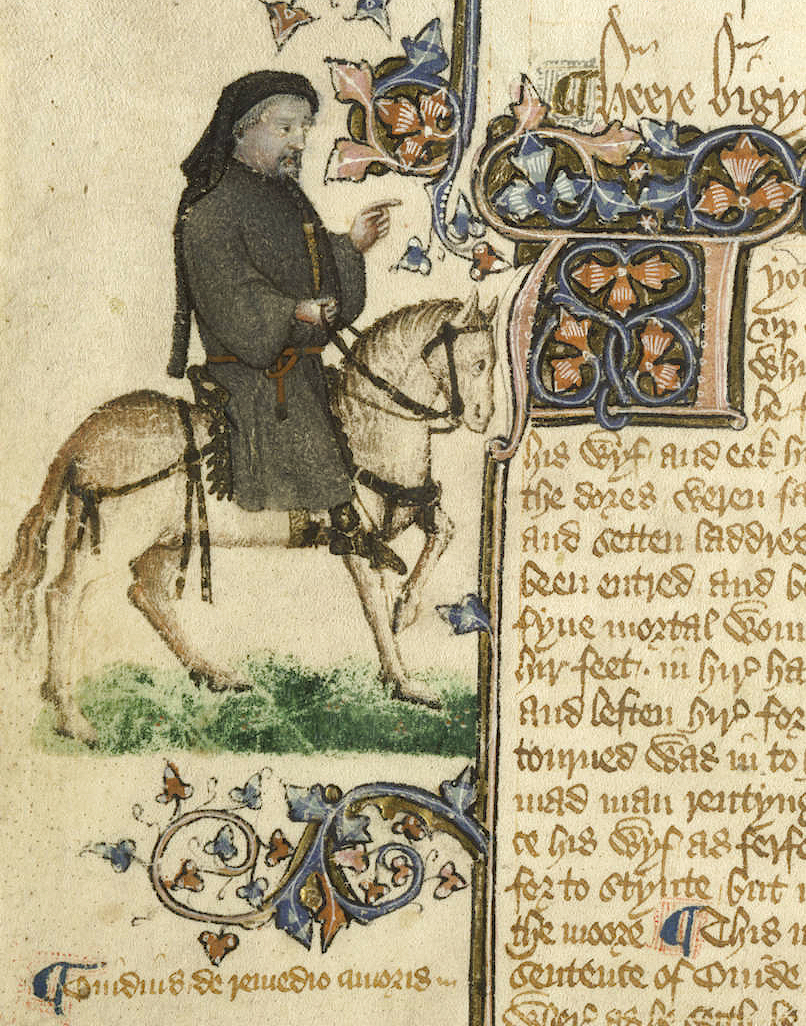
Chaucer

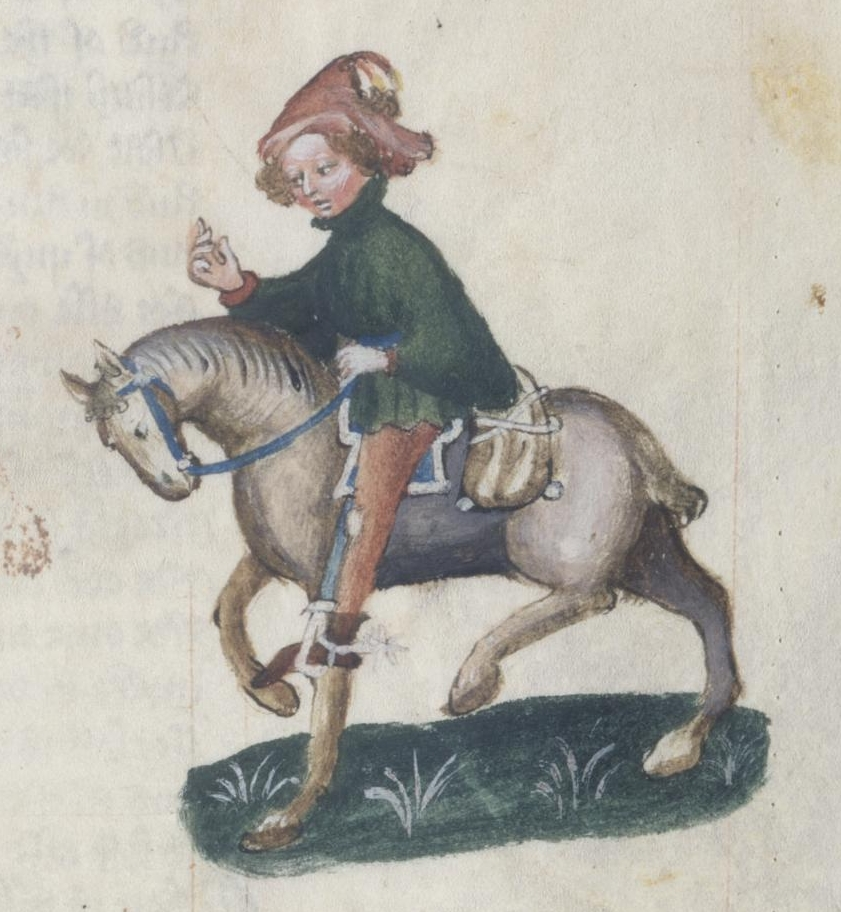
The Canon's Yeoman {not part of the original prologue but added at the end of the Tales}
