= Canterbury Tales (TV series) =

2003 British television series

- Genre: Drama
- Starring: Julie Walters; Billie Piper; James Nesbitt; Kenny Doughty; John Simm; Keeley Hawes; Chiwetel Ejiofor; Dennis Waterman; Andrew Lincoln; Nikki Amuka-Bird
- Country of origin: United Kingdom
- Original language: English
- No. of series: 1
- No. of episodes: 6

Production
- Production locations: Chalfont St. Giles, Buckinghamshire, England; Rochester, Kent, England; Gravesend, Kent, England; River Medway, Kent, England
- Running time: 349 min (6 parts)
- Production company: Ziji Productions

Original release
- Network: BBC One
- Release: 11 September – 16 October 2003

Canterbury Tales is a series of six single dramas that originally aired on BBC One in 2003. Each story is an adaptation of one of Geoffrey Chaucer's 14th-century Canterbury Tales. While the stories have been transferred to a modern 21st-century setting, they are still set along the traditional Pilgrims' route to Canterbury.

Repeats of the series in the UK have aired on channels including ITV3.

== Production ==
The anthology series was conceived by executive producers Laura Mackie and Franc Roddam in 2001, and produced by Kate Bartlett, while a number of writers and directors were chosen specifically to work on individual episodes.

Bartlett said of the productions that:

I wanted to be as faithful to the stories and spirit of the Tales as possible and we have tried to achieve that. ... They had to appeal to those more familiar with Chaucer but also work in their own right as single films, to an audience unfamiliar with Chaucer, and this was important to all of us.

The production filmed in Kent, at Rochester, which is the setting for "The Pardoner's Tale" and features the castle, Cathedral, Chertsey Gate, the High Street, Esplanade, and various streets, pubs, and restaurants. Gravesend is the setting in "The Sea Captain's Tale", where old waterfront warehouses, the pier, and Town Pier Square feature. The river scenes in "The Man of Law's Tale" were filmed on the River Medway and the Medway Estuary.

== Episodes ==
From Chaucer's original collection, the producers chose six tales:

No.	Title	Starring	Directed by	Written by	Original release date	Viewers (millions)
1	The Miller's Tale	James Nesbitt, Dennis Waterman, Billie Piper, Kenny Doughty	John McKay	Peter Bowker	11 September 2003	8.18
John runs a pub in suburban Kent. He hosts a regular karaoke night, where his much-younger and beautiful wife Alison is queen bee. One night, a smooth-talking stranger, Nick (James Nesbitt), arrives, claiming to be a talent scout and declaring that Alison has what it takes to be a star. Alison is drawn to him by the promise of fame, but his motives are not quite what they seem.
2	The Wife of Bath	Julie Walters, Paul Nicholls, Bill Nighy	Andy de Emmony	Sally Wainwright	18 September 2003	7.86
53-year-old Beth Craddock is a successful television actress who still believes in Mr Right, despite a number of failed marriages in her past. When her husband of sixteen years leaves her for another woman, she finds comfort in the arms of her 22-year-old co-star Jerome. They fall passionately in love, but behind the smiles and laughter, the pressures of their age difference are never far away.
3	The Knight's Tale	John Simm, Chiwetel Ejiofor, Keeley Hawes	Marc Munden	Tony Marchant	25 September 2003	5.44
Ace and Paul are two young, working-class prisoners who have been best friends since childhood. When they both fall in love with Emily, a teacher at their prison, their friendship is torn apart, and they become bitter enemies consumed by jealousy. When Ace has served his sentence and Paul makes an escape from prison, events hurtle towards a tragic conclusion.
4	The Sea Captain's Tale	Om Puri, Nitin Ganatra, Indira Varma	John McKay	Avie Luthra	2 October 2003	6.22
A film noir set in the Asian community of Gravesend. Jetender is a wealthy money-lender and importer/exporter: an Asian 'godfather' figure to his community. He goes into business with the young Pushpinder, who falls in love with Jetender's beautiful and extravagant wife, Meena. Meena claims that Jetender is a tyrant who makes her life hell, and she is also heavily in debt. Pushpinder and Meena begin a passionate affair, and Pushpinder borrows money for Meena from her husband. Slowly, though, Pushpinder starts to learn the truth about Meena and her manipulative, deceitful ways.
5	The Pardoner's Tale	Jonny Lee Miller, William Beck	Andy de Emmony	Tony Grounds	9 October 2003	4.4
The local community of Rochester, still in shock after a girl was raped and murdered the previous year, launch a search for missing teenager, Amy. Arty, Colin, and Baz are three unemployed wasters who try to cash in on the search, starting a fake collection for all the volunteers. However, their greed and treatment of a girl, Kitty, who is desperate to find the missing Amy, proves to be their downfal.
6	The Man of Law's Tale	Andrew Lincoln, Nikki Amuka-Bird, Leo Bill	Julian Jarrold	Olivia Hetreed	16 October 2003	4.3
Constance is a Nigerian refugee found on a small boat in the mudflats near Chatham by Mark. He and his wife Nicky take her in. A devout Christian, Constance cannot remember what has happened to her. At church, a young man, Terry, falls for her; however, the feelings are not mutual, as Constance is falling in love with Mark's boss, Alan. When Constance rejects Terry's physical advances, his violent revenge has tragic consequences for all involved.

== Awards and nominations ==
On 29 March 2004, The Wife of Bath was nominated for three awards at the British Academy Television Awards, for Best Single Drama, Best Actress for Julie Walters, and Best Costume Design. Walters went on to win the award.
