= A Commentary on the General Prologue to The Canterbury Tales =

- First edition
- Author: Muriel Bowden
- Language: English
- Subject: The Canterbury Tales
- Published: 1948 (The Macmillan Company)
- Publication place: United States
- Pages: 316
- OCLC: 350912
- Dewey Decimal: 821.17
- LC Class: PR1868.P8 B6

A Commentary on the General Prologue to The Canterbury Tales is a 1948 doctoral dissertation by Muriel Bowden that examines historical backgrounds to characters in Geoffrey Chaucer's The Canterbury Tales within the context of its General Prologue.
