= Maniple =

Maniple may refer to:

- Maniple (military unit), a division of a Roman legion
- Maniple (vestment), a liturgical vestment worn on the left arm

== See also ==
- Manciple, a food-service occupation
