= Anne Middleton =

Dr. Anne L. Middleton
- Born: June 18, 1940
- Died: November 23, 2016 (aged 76); Berkeley, California, U.S.
- Occupation: Professor
- Spouse: Gene Rochlin

Academic background
- Education: Harvard University
- Doctoral advisor: Morton W. Bloomfield

Academic work
- Institutions: Detroit Public Schools; University of Michigan; University of California, Berkeley
- Influenced: Steven Justice (Berkeley)

Anne Middleton (July 18, 1940 – November 23, 2016) was an American medievalist, and the Florence Green Bixby Professor of English at the University of California, Berkeley.

Middleton specialized in the study of Chaucer, Langland, and Gower. In 1966, she completed her PhD at Harvard University under the supervision of Morton W. Bloomfield, writing a dissertation on the prose style of Ælfric’s lives of St. Martin. A firm "believ[er] in public universities as public goods", known for "cheerful contempt of the private schools and their ways", she spent the bulk of her career in public education, working first in the Detroit school system, then the University of Michigan, and finally at Berkeley, where she taught until her retirement.

Middleton was known as "a titanic figure in Middle English literary studies". Her work on Chaucer, especially "The Clerk's Tale", is praised by scholars for its contribution to the understanding of Chaucer and Chaucer's audience. Some of her essays are collected in a 2013 collection edited by Steven Justice and published by Ashgate, Chaucer, Langland, and Fourteenth-Century Literary History; in the same year, Ohio State University Press published an edited collection, Answerable Style, whose contributions take Middleton's work as a "touchstone". Many of the contributions to the volume had been presented at a conference held, in Middleton's honour, at Berkeley in April 2008.

In addition to a UC President's Fellowship, Middleton held fellowships from the American Council of Learned Societies, the Guggenheim Foundation, and the National Endowment for the Humanities (both for group and for individual research), and was awarded the Berkeley Citation upon her retirement in 2006. She died in her sleep in November 2016, "one month after receiving a diagnosis of acute myeloid leukemia".

== Selected publications ==
- 2013: Chaucer, Langland, and Fourteenth-Century Literary History. Edited by Steven Justice. (Ashgate).
- 2013: “Loose Talk from Langland to Chaucer.” Studies in the Age of Chaucer 35.1: 29–46.
- 2010: “Commentary on an Unacknowledged Text: Chaucer’s Debt to Langland.” The Yearbook of Langland Studies 24: 113–137.
- 1998: “Thomas Usk’s ‘Perdurable Letters’: The ‘Testament of Love’ from Script to Print.” Studies in Bibliography 51: 63–116.
- 1997: “Acts of Vagrancy: the C Version ‘Autobiography’ and the Statute of 1388.” Written Work: Langland, Labor, and Authorship. Edited by Steven Justice and Kathryn Kerby-Fulton (University of Pennsylvania Press), 208–317.
- 1990: “Life in the Margins, or, What's an Annotator to Do?” Library Chronicle of the University of Texas 20.1–2: 166–183.
- 1990: “William Langland’s ‘Kynde Name’: Authorial Signature and Social Identity in Late Fourteenth-Century England”. Literary Practice and Social Change in Britain, 1380–1530. Edited by Lee Patterson (University of California Press), 15–82.
- 1987: “The Passion of Seint Averoys [B. 13.91]: ‘Deuynyng’ and Divinity in the Banquet Scene.” The Yearbook of Langland Studies 1: 31–40.
- 1982: “The Audience and Public of Piers Plowman.” Middle English Alliterative Poetry and Its Literary Background. Edited by David Lawton (D.S. Brewer), 101–154.
- 1982: “Narration and the Invention of Experience: Episodic Form in Piers Plowman.” The Wisdom of Poetry: Essays in Early English Literature in Honor of Morton W. Bloomfield. Edited by Larry Dean Benson and Siegfried Wenzel. (Medieval Institute Publications), 91–122.
- 1978: “The Idea of Public Poetry in the Reign of Richard II.” Speculum 53.1: 94–114.
