= Influence of Italian humanism on Chaucer =

Impact on English poet and writer

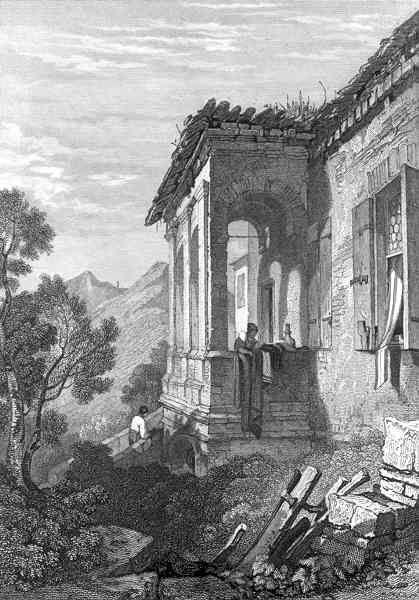
Petrarch's Arquà house near Padua in 1831 (artist's depiction with a tourist).

The works of Geoffrey Chaucer, such as the Canterbury Tales, frequently borrow from the works of the Italian humanists Francis Petrarch and Giovanni Boccaccio.

For centuries, some scholars have further proposed that Chaucer might actually have met Petrarch and/or Boccaccio in person during a trip to Italy. Notable proponents of Chaucer–Boccaccio and/or Chaucer–Petrarch contact include F. J. Furnivall (1825–1910), W. W. Skeat (1835–1912), and Donald Howard (1927–1987). More recent scholarship tends to discount these speculations. As Leonard Koff remarks, the notion that Chaucer ever met Boccaccio in person is "a 'tydyng' worthy of Chaucer himself" — alluding to the mingled true and false tidings that fill Chaucer's House of Fame.

== Chaucer's trips to mainland Europe ==
There are government records that show Chaucer was absent from England visiting Genoa and Florence from December 1372 until the middle of 1373. He went with Sir James de Provan and John de Mari, eminent merchants hired by the king, and some soldiers and servants. During this Italian business trip for the king to arrange for a settlement of Genoese merchants these scholars say it is likely that sometime in 1373 Chaucer made contact with Petrarch or Boccaccio.

=== Milan 1368: The wedding of the Duke of Clarence and Violante Visconti ===
They believe it plausible that Chaucer not only met Petrarch at this wedding but also Boccaccio. This view today, however, is far from universally accepted. William T. Rossiter, in his 2010 book on Chaucer and Petrarch, argues that the key evidence supporting a visit to the continent in this year is a warrant permitting Chaucer to pass at Dover, dated 17 July. No destination is given, but even if this does represent a trip to Milan, he would have missed not only the wedding, but also Petrarch, who had returned to Pavia on 3 July.

== Chaucer's works ==
=== The Canterbury Tales ===
==== The Knight's Tale ====
Chaucer's "Knight's Tale" is a condensed version of Boccaccio's Teseida. Chaucer changes some scenes and deepens the philosophy of the original. In the tale, the disguised Arcite takes the name "Philostrate," which may be an allusion to Boccaccio's Il Filostrato.

==== The Clerk's Tale ====
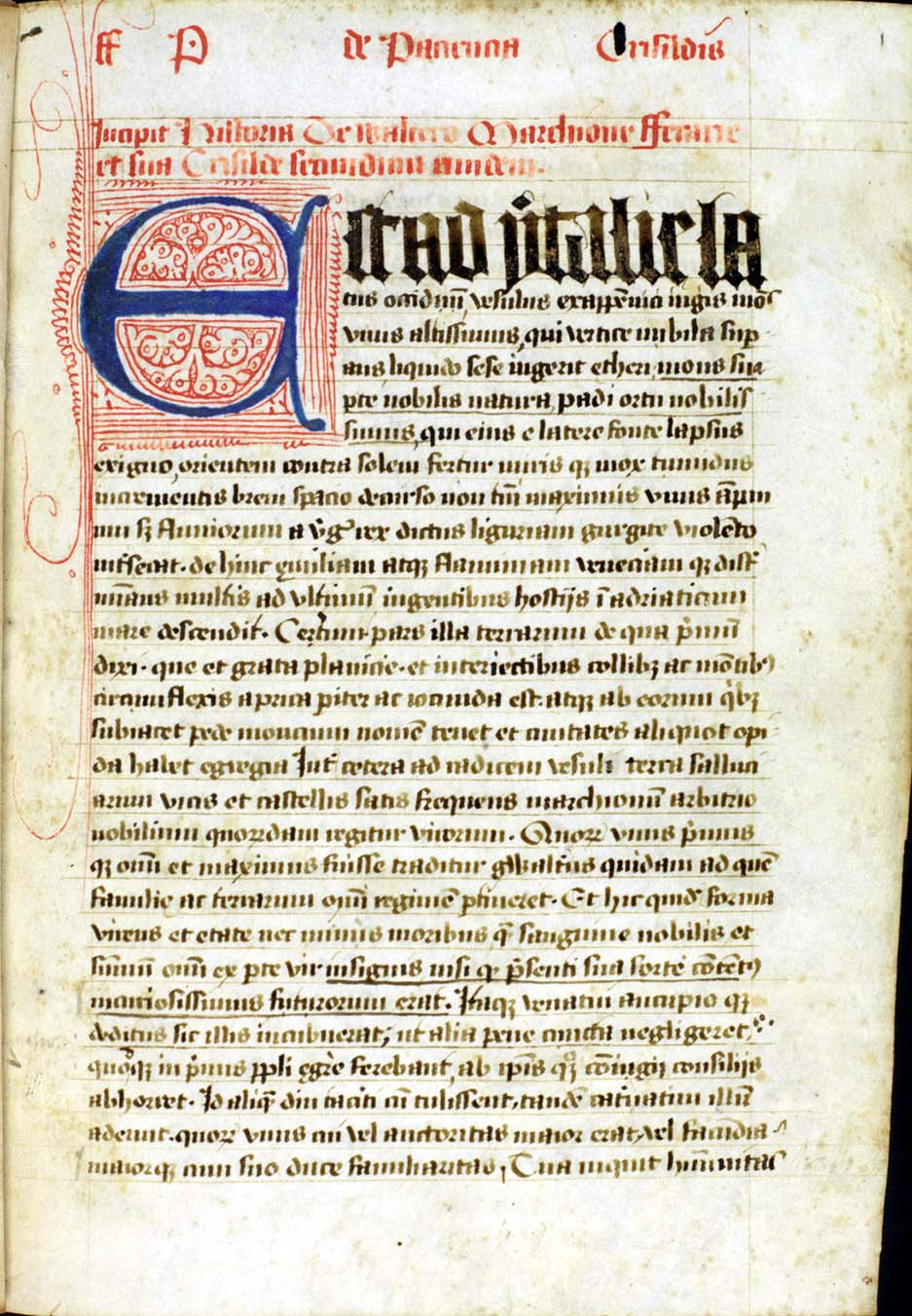
The last tale of Boccaccio's Decameron became Petrarch's "De Patientia Griseldis", which later became Chaucer's Clerk's Tale.

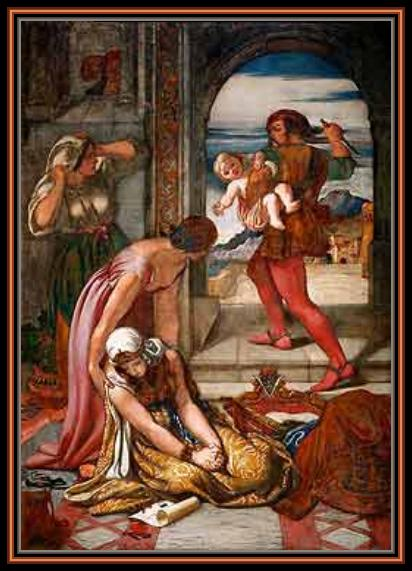
The Clerk's Tale – story of "Griselda"

Chaucer's "Clerk's Tale" tells the story of Griselda. This story had previously appeared as the final tale of Boccaccio's Decameron. Petrarch then translated Boccaccio's story from Italian into Latin. In the "Clerk's Prologue," the (fictional) Clerk himself claims to have traveled to Padua and there met Petrarch, who told him the story.

I wol yow telle a tale, which that I
Lerned at Padwe of a worthy clerk,
As preved by his wordes and his werk.
He is now deed, and nayled in his cheste;
I prey to God so yeve his soule reste.
Fraunceys Petrark, the lauriat poete,
Highte this clerk, whos rethorike sweete
Enlumyned al Ytaille of poetrie,
As Lynyan dide of philosophie [...]
[...] this worthy man,
That taughte me this tale as I bigan [...]

Of course, that Chaucer made his fictional Clerk travel to Padua and meet Petrarch is no evidence that Chaucer himself (in real life) ever made such a trip.

==== The Shipman's Tale ====
The "Shipman's Tale" has essentially the same plot as Decameron 8.1. Both tales concern a merchant whose wife, unknown to him, is inclined to sell her sexual favors. The merchant's friend borrows money from him, ostensibly to invest; but then gives the money to the wife in exchange for her favors instead. Finally, when the merchant asks to be repaid, the friend tells him that he has already paid back the money, and that he should ask his wife for it.

In the Decameron version of the tale, the friend is a German soldier visiting Milan; the wife asks bluntly for money in exchange for sex; and at the end of the tale the wife pays the money back to her husband. Chaucer's version is set in France; the friend is a traveling monk; the merchant's wife obliquely requests money "to repay a loan"; and at the end of the tale the wife explains to her husband that she has already spent the money she was given, and repays the merchant in bed instead. Despite these minor differences, Decameron 8.1 is "the closest analogue" known to the Shipman's Tale. Decameron 8.1 was also the basis of Giovanni Sercambi's novella De avaritia et luzuria, "the only other extant analogue that Chaucer could have known."

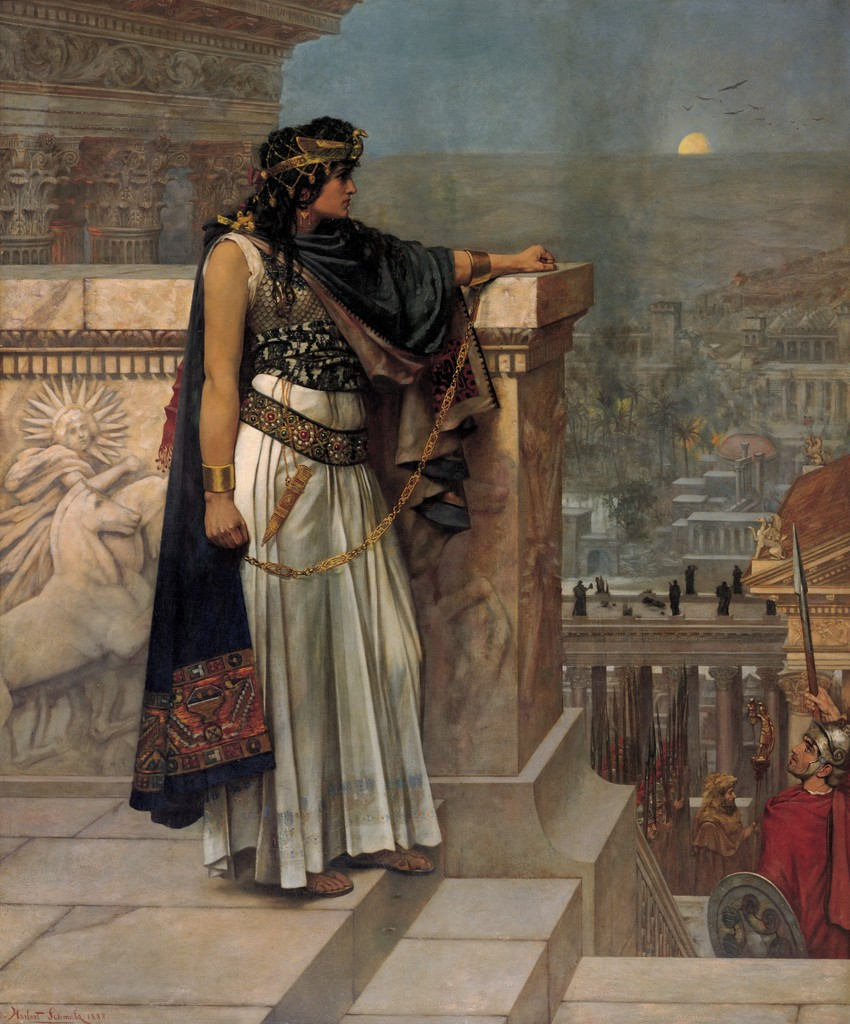
Zenobia in Chaucer's Good Women and The Monk's Tale is taken directly from Boccaccio's De mulieribus claris.

=== Troilus and Creseyde ===
Boccaccio's Filostrato is the major source of Chaucer's Troilus and Creseyde.

=== The Legend of Good Women ===
Chaucer followed the general plan of Boccaccio's work On Famous Women in The Legend of Good Women.

== Sources ==
- Ames, Percy Willoughby (1900). Chaucer memorial lectures. Asher and Co., London.
- American Society for the Extension of University Teaching, The Citizen, Volume 3, American Society for the Extension of University Teaching, 1898, University of Michigan
- Bell, G. & Sons, 1912, The age of Chaucer (1346–1400), p. 152, Indiana University
- Boitani, Piero (1985). Chaucer and the Italian Trecento. CUP Archive. ISBN 0-521-31350-3.
- Borghesi, Peter (1903). Boccaccio and Chaucer. Princeton University: N. Zanichelli. "Borghesi, Peter, Boccaccio and Chaucer, N. Zanichelli, 1903,."
- Brown, Peter, A companion to Chaucer, pp. 454–456, Wiley-Blackwell, 2002, ISBN 0-631-23590-6
- Brewer, Derek, ed. (1995). Geoffrey Chaucer: The Critical Heritage: 1385–1837. Routledge. ISBN 0-415-13398-X.
- Chambers, Robert, Cyclopaedia of English literature: a selection of the choicest productions of English authors from the earliest to the present time, World Publishing House, 1875, from HUP
- Chaucer, Geoffrey, The works of Geoffrey Chaucer, Publisher Macmillan, 1898, Harvard University
- Chaucer, Geoffrey (2001). "The Canterbury Tales and Other Poems". The Project Gutenberg. Archived from the original on 16 March 2011.
- Cook, Albert Stanburrough (1916). "The Last Months of Chaucer's Earliest Patron". Transactions of the Connecticut Academy of Arts and Sciences. 21: 1–144.
- Coulton, George Gordon (1908). Chaucer and his England. Methuen, London. at Internet Archive
- Coulton, George Gordon (1965). Chaucer and his England. Routledge. ISBN 0-416-67970-6.
- Cousin, John W. (1910). A short biographical dictionary of English literature. Plain Label Books. ISBN 1-60303-696-2.
- Crow, Martin M. et al., Chaucer Life-records, Clarendon Press, 1966. It includes materials such as receipts for his travels in Italy, copies of commissions, etc.
- Curry, William (1869). The Dublin University magazine, Volume 74. Princeton University: William Curry, Jun., and Co.
- Dempster, Germaine (1943). "Chaucer's manuscript of Petrarch's version of the Griselda story". Modern Philology. 41 (1). University of Chicago Press: 6–16. doi:10.1086/388598. JSTOR 433948. S2CID 162034900.
- Edmunds, Edward William, Chaucer & his poetry, Volume 26 of Poetry & life series, p. 50, C.G. Harrap & Company, 1914
- Farrell, Thomas J. (2003). "Source or Hard Analogue? Decameron X, 10 and the Clerk's Tale". The Chaucer Review. 37 (4): 346–364. doi:10.1353/cr.2003.0011.
- Finlayson, John (2000). "Petrarch, Boccaccio, and Chaucer's Clerk's Tale". Studies in Philology. xcvii (3): 255–275. JSTOR 4174672.
- Gardner, John (1999). Life and Times of Chaucer. Princeton University: Barnes & Noble Publishing. p. 321. ISBN 0-394-49317-6. "Chaucer met Petrarch."
- Garnett, Richard, English literature : an illustrated record, Heinemann, 1906, from University of Michigan
- Ginsberg, Warren (2001). "Chaucer's Italian Tradition" (PDF). University of Michigan Press.
- Gosse, Edmund, English literature : an illustrated record, p. 137, Heinemann, 1906. University of Michigan
- Guiney, Louise Imogen (1908). "Geoffrey Chaucer". New Advent.
- Gray, Douglas (2003). The Oxford Companion – Chaucer. Oxford University: Oxford University Press. ISBN 0-19-811765-5.
- Hales, John Wesley (1887). "Chaucer, Geoffrey". In Stephen, Leslie (ed.). Dictionary of National Biography. Vol. 10. London: Smith, Elder & Co.
- Hammond, Eleanor Prescott, Chaucer: a bibliographical manual, p. 306, The Macmillan Company, 1908
- Hendrickson, G.L. (1907). Modern philology, Volume 4, complete detailed analysis as to Chaucer coming in contact with Petrarch and Boccaccio. Harvard University: University of Chicago Press.
- Howard, Donald R. (1987). Chaucer, his life, his works, his world. E. P. Dutton. ISBN 0-525-24400-X. "Dutton Donald Howard Chaucer 1987 His-life his-world His works."
- Hunt, Leigh, Leigh Hunt's London journal, Volumes 1–2, C. Knight, 1834
- Hutton, Edward, Giovanni Boccaccio: a biographical study, J. Lane, 1910, University of California
- James Clarke & Co., The literary world, Volume 21, 1880, p. 251, Princeton University
- Jenks, Tudor, In the days of Chaucer, p. 144, A. S. Barnes & company, 1904, Harvard University
- Johns Hopkins University, Modern language notes, Volume 12 No. 1, Johns Hopkins Press, 1897
- Jusserand, J.J., The Twentieth century, Volume 39, The Nineteenth Century and After, 1896, pp. 993–1005, detailed analysis of Chaucer coming in contact with Petrarch in 1373. UOM
- Koff, Leonard Michael. "Introduction". The Decameron and the Canterbury Tales: New Essays on an Old Question. Madison: Fairleigh Dickinson University Press, 2000.
- Langer, William Leonard, An encyclopaedia of world history, ancient, medieval and modern ..., Volume 1, p. 267, Houghton Mifflin Co., 1948
- Meiklejohn, John Miller Dow (1887). "English Language and Literature – Geoffrey Chaucer". A Brief History of the English Language and Literature, Volume 2. The Project Gutenberg EBook / D. C. Heath & Co.
- Rossiter, William T. (2010). Chaucer and Petrarch. Chaucer studies. Cambridge: D.S. Brewer. p. 38. ISBN 978-1-84384-215-6.
- Rutherford, Mildred Lewis, French authors: a hand-book of French literature , p. 39, The Franklin Printing and Publishing Company, 1906, Princeton University
- Schibanoff, Susan, Chaucer's queer poetics: rereading the dream trio, p. 316, University of Toronto Press, 2006, ISBN 0-8020-9035-4
- Skeat, Walter William (1894). The Complete Works of Geoffrey Chaucer (vol 3): The house of fame:The legend of good women: The treatise on the Astrolabe: Canterbury tales text. Clarendon press. "House of Fame Chaucer Petrarch."
- Skeat, Walter William (1900). The Complete Works of Geoffrey Chaucer (vol 3–4): The house of fame:The legend of good women: The treatise on the Astrolabe: Canterbury tales text. Clarendon press.
- Skeat, Walter William (1906). The prioresses tale, Sire Thopas, the Monkes tale: the Clerkes tale ... from the Canterbury tales. Clarendon Press.
- Rev. Prof. Skeat, M.A. with Portrait of Chaucer. 4 vols (1910). "Books on Chaucer". Bohris Standard Library – via Internet Archive.
- Stearns, Peter N. The Encyclopedia of world history: ancient, medieval, and modern, p. 240, Houghton Mifflin Harcourt, 2001, ISBN 0-395-65237-5
- Rearden, T.H. (1882). The Californian, Volume 5. University of California.
- Tatlock, John Strong Perry, The development and chronology of Chaucer's works, Pub. for the Chaucer society, by K. Paul, Trench, Trübner & co., limited, 1907
- Tyrwhitt, Thomas (1860). "Canterbury tales. To which are added an essay on his language and versification, and an introductory discourse, together with notes and a glossary". London: James Nisbet & Co – via Internet Archive.
- Wallace, David, Giovanni Boccaccio, Decameron, pp. 48, 110–112, Cambridge University Press, 1991, ISBN 0-521-38851-1
- Ward, Sir Adolphus William, Chaucer, pp. 73–74, MacMillan and Company limited, 1907, University of California
- Warton, Thomas (1871). The history of English poetry, from the close of the eleventh to the commencement of the eighteenth century, Volume II. Princeton University: Reeves and Turner.
- St. Clair Baddeley (9 October 1897). "Chaucer's 'Stilbon'". Notes and Queries (8th S. XII): 283–285. "Chaucer would seem to have entertained an emphatic dislike for naming Boccaccio. He gaily borrows and translates from Boccaccio's 'Filostrato' in 'Troilus and Criseyde' to the extent of over a thousand lines, and calmly tells his readers that his author is called 'Lollius.' He has taken both the 'Knight's Tale' and the account of Zenobia in the 'Monk's Tale' from the 'Teseide' and the 'De Claris Mulieribus' respectively, and yet he has given Petrarch the credit of being his original in both instances."
- anon (1898). "American Society for the Extension of University Teaching". The Citizen. 3.
- anon (December 2004). "Echoes of Boethius and Dante in Chaucer's Troilus and Criseyde". Medieval and Early Modern English Studies. 12 (2). Archived from the original on 18 January 2010.
- anon (1897). Modern language notes, Volume 12 No. 1 – Detailed analysis of Chaucer contact with Petrarch. Johns Hopkins Press: Johns Hopkins University.
- anon (2008). "The World of Chaucer – Medieval Books and Manuscripts: Influences". Glasgow: Special Collections Department, Library, University of Glasgow.
