= The Physician's Tale =

Part of the Canterbury Tales

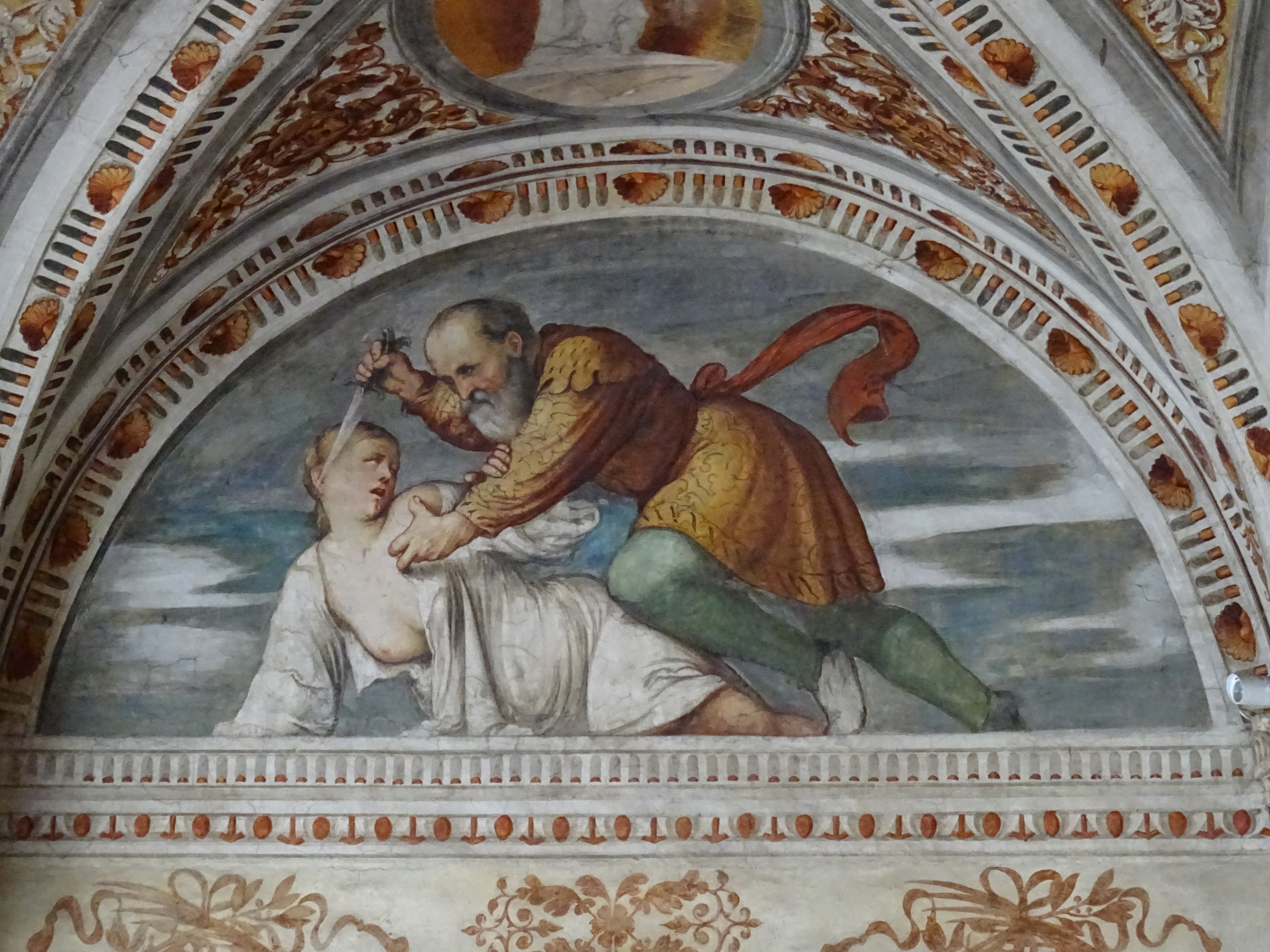
Virginia's death as depicted by Romanino.

"The Physician's Tale" is one of The Canterbury Tales, written by Geoffrey Chaucer in the 14th century. It adapts the tale of Verginia told by Livy in his Histories and retold in The Romance of the Rose. Additionally, Chaucer drew for inspiration on John Gower's Confessio Amantis and on the biblical story of Jephthah.

Like most of Chaucer's tales, the Physician's Tale is difficult to date. However, it is usually regarded as an early work of Chaucer — probably written before much of the rest of the Canterbury Tales. Some scholars believe it may have originally been intended for Chaucer's poem The Legend of Good Women instead. The long digression on governesses possibly alludes to a historical event and may serve to date it. In 1386, Elizabeth, the daughter of John of Gaunt, eloped to France with John Hastings, 3rd Earl of Pembroke. Elizabeth's governess was Katherine Swynford, who was also Gaunt's mistress and later wife. Chaucer's words on the virtues of governesses were potentially influenced by this scandal.

The Physician's Tale is widely considered by Chaucerian scholars to be a failure, largely due to its convoluted moral message. However, the story is still considered one of the moral tales, along with the Parson's Tale and the Knight's Tale. Additionally, the Physician's Tale is considered part of the Children's Cluster, a group of tales centered around child characters or themes of childhood. Other tales in this cluster are the Prioress's Tale and the Pardoner's Tale.

== Characters ==
- Virginius – a knight, the father of the fourteen-year-old Virginia, who kills his daughter rather than give her up to the corrupt judge Apius.
- Virginia – the daughter of Virginius. Not wishing to give herself to Apius and lose her virtue, she consents to her father's plan.
- Apius (Livy's "Appius Claudius") – a corrupt judge and the antagonist of the tale. He lusts after Virginia and concocts a plan in order to acquire her through legal means.
- Claudius (Livy's "Marcus Claudius") – A "churl" in Apius's employ; instructed to claim in court that Virginia is actually a slave whom Virginius abducted.

Unnamed but mentioned characters include Virginia's mother (Livy's "Numitoria") and the thousand citizens who rise up against Apius.

== Plot ==
The tale is a version of a story related both by the Roman historian Livy in Book Three of Ab Urbe Condita and by Jean de Meun in his 13th-century poem Roman de la Rose. While Chaucer may or may not have read Livy's telling, he was certainly familiar with Jean de Meun's. The story opens with a description of the noble Virginius and his daughter, the beautiful, virtuous Virginia, who is 14 years old. One day, Virginia goes to the church with her mother and is spotted by a judge, whose name is Apius. Upon seeing her, Apius is filled with lust and decides he must have her. When his plans to woo her fail, he then concocts a scheme to legally take her for himself. He contacts a local peasant named Claudius, who has a reputation for being both bold and cunning, and asks for assistance in the matter. Claudius accepts and is rewarded handsomely. Some time later, Claudius appears before Apius in court to file a complaint against Virginius, saying he has witnesses of his misdeeds. Apius declares that he cannot try Virginius without him being present. Virginius is called to the court and Claudius begins his accusation: Virginius stole one of Claudius' servants one night while she was young and raised her as his daughter. He then implores Apius to return his slave to him — to which Apius agrees, refusing to listen to Virginius' defense.

Following the sentence, Virginius returns home with a "deathlike" face and calls his daughter into the hall. He then informs Virginia of the events that have transpired and offers her two choices: to be shamed by Apius and lose her virtue or to die at her father's hand. Recalling the story of Jephthah, Virginia asks for time to lament her position for a moment before consenting to death by her father's blade. Virginius then beheads Virginia and brings her head to Apius in court. Upon seeing Virginia's severed head, Apius orders that Virginius be hanged immediately. However, a thousand people burst into the room in response and defend Virginius, having heard of Claudius' false charges and reasoning that Apius had arranged it based on the judge's lecherous reputation. Apius is arrested and thrown in prison, where he commits suicide. Claudius is set to be hanged with the others who had helped Apius in his scheme; but Virginius, in a moment of clemency, asks that the peasant be exiled instead. The tale then ends with the Physician warning of the repercussions of sin. The Host bewails Virginia's fate and asks the Pardoner for a merrier, if still moral, tale.

== Themes ==
Recurring themes in the tale include consent, virtue, justice, and sacrifice.

On the subject of consent, many critics have noted that in the original versions of the story Virginia was not given the choice of whether she could live or not. For example, in her essay "The Creation of Consent in the Physician's Tale", Lianna Farber points out the detail of Virginia's consent to death "appears neither in Chaucer's stated source, Livy's history, which Chaucer may or may not have known, nor in his unstated source, Jean de Meun's Roman de la Rose, which Chaucer most certainly did know" meaning that Chaucer added the detail to the story himself. Chaucer's goal in giving Virginia a choice in his version of the tale is unclear. Farber also points out a flaw in Virginius's ultimatum of death or dishonor: "these alternatives are problematic because there would presumably be many other ways to deal with the situation: Virginia could run away; she could go into hiding; Virginius could stall for time while he called together all their friends who were pointedly mentioned when we were introduced to Virginius; and on and on."

Some argue that the purpose of Virginia's death is to highlight Virginius's ineptitude as a father. Farber states that Virginius's ultimatum to his daughter would not have been seen as the proper action for a father to take: "it turns out, audiences of the story other than the Host tend to agree, that this is bad governance." However, Farber also argues in the other direction saying that "the responsibility does not lie entirely with Virginius: Virginia embraces her father's logic as well as his power and, voicing both, consents to her own death."

Many critics and theorists have also analyzed the value and impact of Virginia's sacrifice in the tale. Daniel T. Kline, in his essay "Jephthah's Daughter and Chaucer's Virginia: The Critique of Sacrifice in The Physician's Tale", asserts that "the Physician's Tale should be read in light not of traditional hagiographical narrative, in which sacrificial death is socially valorized and theologically naturalized, but in view of the account of Jephthah's daughter in Judges 11, a Biblical tale in which the daughter's sacrifice is neither lauded nor condemned." In short, Kline states that Virginia's sacrifice was not something noble but rather a tragic result of a series of unfortunate events.

== Titus Andronicus ==
Shakespeare's Titus Andronicus pays homage to this tale. After Lavinia is raped and mutilated, her father Titus kills her, arguing that she "should not survive her shame". He then compares himself to Virginius.
