= Manciple =

Steward for a college or monastery

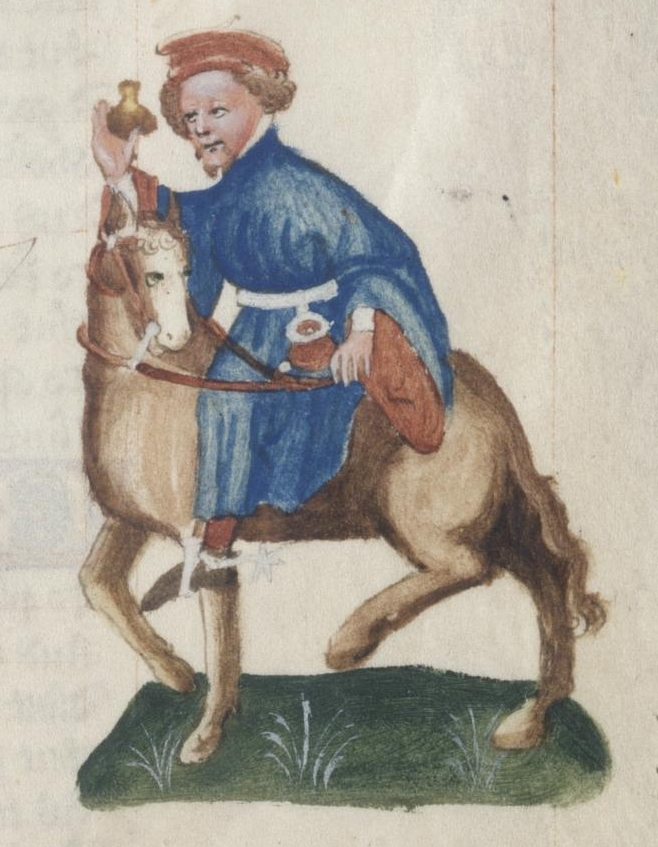
A manciple illustrated in the Ellesmere Chaucer

A manciple /ˈmænsɪpəl/ is a person in charge of the purchase and storage of food at an institution such as a college, monastery, or court of law. Manciples were sometimes also in charge of catering more generally, including food preparation.

The title still survives in some Oxford and Cambridge colleges, at the Charterhouse in the City of London, in the Party of the Right of Yale University, in Freemasonry as the title of one of the council officers in the Order of Royal and Select Masters (or Council of Cryptic Masons), and in the name of Manciple Street in the borough of Southwark, London SE1.

An exception to the established role of a College Manciple, were the expanded duties of the Manciple at All Souls College, Oxford. Similar to that of a Domestic Bursar at larger colleges, the Manciple’s tasks included a wide range of accountability and responsibility which encompassed the overall day-to-day operational management of non-academic (domestic) services for the College, the organisation and support of College Events, and the maintenance of the College fabric. The Manciple oversaw eight Heads of Departments, responsible for the delivery of Kitchen catering, Pantry and Buttery services, Housekeeping, Accommodation allocation and rentals, Lodge reception and security, Repairs and maintenance, Gardening and Events.

The Manciple was also accountable for the oversight of fellows battels, personnel and training of the Domestic Staff, day to day health and safety management, and the authorisation of delegated college domestic expenditure in support of these duties.

The last post-holder to occupy this expansive role was given the honorary title of "Manciple Extraordinarius" by the College until his retirement in January 2024. A smaller portfolio was then implemented consisting of Catering, Dining Services, Housekeeping and accommodation, Lodge and the Events department. The title then reverted back to "Manciple".

The position of Manciple at All Souls can be traced back to the original statutes of the College dated 20th April 1443, under the co-founder Henry Chichele, who decreed that: A Manciple (also known as 'steward' or 'butler') was to be head servant and was to purchase provisions for the college, and the Chief Cook when 'he hath leisure' was to assist the Manciple.

The term comes from Middle English maunciple, taken from Old French, which in turn comes from the Latin mancipium, manceps, a purchaser of stores.

== See also ==
- The Manciple's Prologue and Tale
- Kappiya, a similar role in Buddhism
