= The Prioress's Tale =

Part of the Canterbury Tales

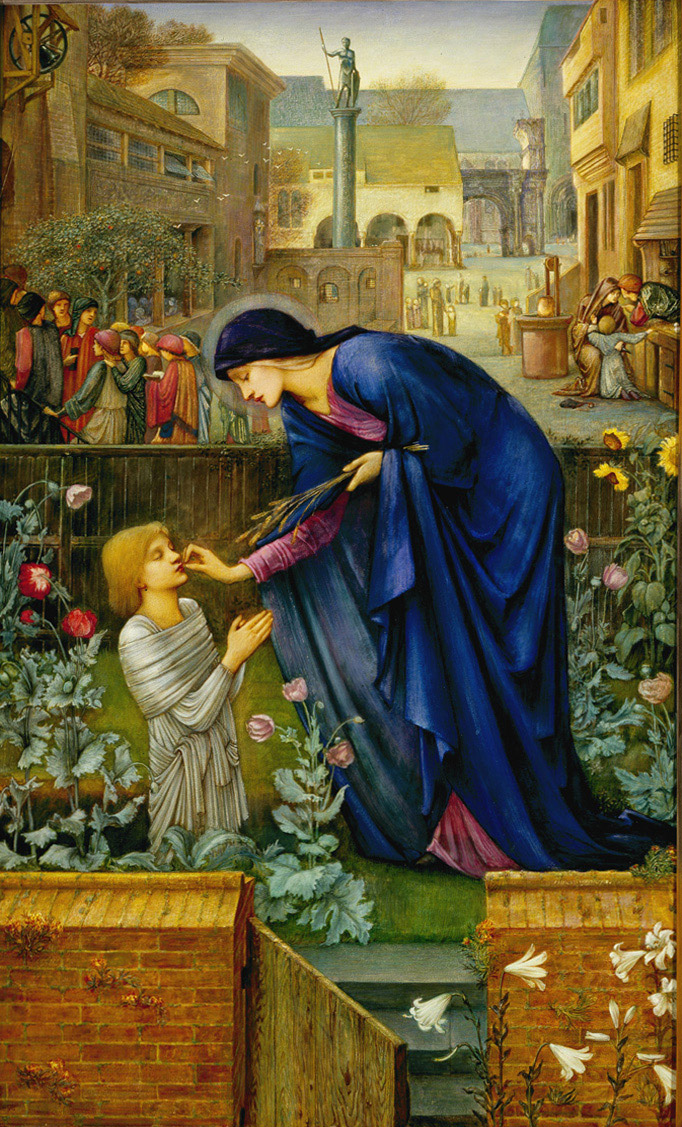
The Prioress's Tale, a painting by Edward Coley Burne-Jones

"The Prioress's Tale" is one of The Canterbury Tales by Geoffrey Chaucer.

It follows "The Shipman's Tale" in The Canterbury Tales and is followed by "The Tale of Sir Topas". The General Prologue names the prioress as Madame Eglantine, and describes her impeccable table manners and soft-hearted ways. Her portrait suggests she is likely in religious life as a means of social advancement, given her aristocratic manners and mispronounced French. She maintains a secular lifestyle, including keeping lap dogs that she privileges over people, a fancy rosary and a brooch inscribed with Amor vincit omnia ('Love Conquers All').

Her story is of a child martyr killed by Jews, a common theme in Medieval Christianity, and much later criticism focuses on the tale's antisemitism.

== Plot ==
The story is introduced with an invocation to the Virgin Mary, then sets the scene in Asia, where a community of Jews live in a Christian city. A seven-year-old school-boy, son of a widow, is brought up to revere Mary. He teaches himself to sing the first verse of the popular medieval hymn Alma Redemptoris Mater ("Nurturing Mother of the Redeemer"); although he does not understand the words, an older classmate tells him it is about Mary, the mother of Jesus. He begins to sing it every day as he walks through the local Jewish ghetto to school.

Satan, "That hath (built) in Jewes' heart his waspe's nest", incites some Jews to murder the child and throw his body into a public cesspit. His mother searches for him and eventually finds his body, which miraculously begins to sing the Alma Redemptoris. The Christians call in the city magistrate, who has the Jews drawn by wild horses and then hanged. The boy continues to sing throughout his own Requiem Mass until the local abbot asks him how he is able to do so. He replies that although his throat is cut, Mary appeared to him and laid a grain of wheat on his tongue, saying he could keep singing until it was removed and she would come for him. The abbot removes the grain and the boy finally becomes silent and dies. The story ends with a reference to Little Saint Hugh of Lincoln, another child martyr whose death was blamed on Jews.

== The Prioress and the Pardoner ==
In "Chaucer's Prioress and the Sacrifice of Praise", Sherman Hawkins juxtaposes the Pardoner and the Prioress as the representatives of two radically different forms of religious expression. The Pardoner's materialistic orientation, his suspicious relics and accusations of sinfulness (evident in his conflict with the Host) align him with Paul's account of the "outward Jew, circumcised only in the flesh", rather than the "inward" Jew of Romans 2.29 who is spiritually rather than literally circumcised: "the Pardoner, outwardly 'a noble ecclesiaste', actually reduces Christianity to a code as rigorous and external as the Old Law itself." In his tale, "the Pardoner presents death as the wages of sin, an effect of justice" while the "Prioress, through the paradox of martyrdom, shows it as mercy, an effect of grace."

In "Criticism, Anti-Semitism and the Prioress' Tale", L. O. Fradenburg argues for a radical rereading of the binary oppositions between Christian and Jew, Old Law and New Law, literal and spiritual in the tale in part to critique the "patristic exegesis" of Sherman Hawkins' earlier interpretation. Fradenburg challenges Hawkins' "elision of the 'literal' or 'carnal' level of meaning in favour of the spiritual" by lingering on those moments in the tale, such as the "litel clergeon's" transgressive rote memorisation of the Alma Redemptoris, in which this elision fails, or succeeds only ambiguously. She traces the impossibility of ultimately separating and opposing Old and New Laws in the "Prioress' Tale" back to a tension between letter and spirit internal to Paul's discourse itself. Fradenburg gestures at a larger project of turning "patristic exegesis" against itself to read the contradictions revealed by the theological subtext of the tale.

Fradenburg notes that the substance of the "Prioress' Tale" can be linked to the "'child-host' miracle of the later Middle Ages" which involved the substitution of the "actual body of the Christ Child" for the Eucharist. Such miraculous tales appear designed to reaffirm faith in the miraculous efficacy of transubstantiation in the face of the pressure of Lollard dissent, which broadly questioned the spiritual status of the Eucharist and other Church traditions: relics, clerical celibacy, even pilgrimages. According to Fradenburg, these miraculous tales operate according to a paradoxical logic in which "visuality and carnality are used to insist upon the superior virtue of that which is beyond sight and flesh". Yet such sacramental materialism remains vulnerable to the kinds of abuse more obviously associated with the Pardoner; Fradenburg cites the case of Little Saint Hugh of Lincoln, the historical episode of the young English Christian supposedly martyred by Jews, "slayn also / With cursed Jewes, as it is notable / For it is but a litel while ago" (VII 684–686), tacked onto the end of the "Prioress' Tale". The tale was intimately bound up with attempts to "aggrandise the spiritual prestige and temporal revenues" of the local cathedral. Thus the vivid "carnality" of the miraculous tale of martyrdom could be deployed as easily to enhance the worldly prominence of the Church as to refute heretical doctrine by reaffirming the spiritual legitimacy of Church rituals. The "Prioress' Tale" may approximate the greedy exploitation of spirituality embodied by "The Pardoner's Prologue and Tale" insofar as it is indebted to tales of martyrdom circulated for worldly profit.

== See also ==
- Blood libel
