= The Parson's Tale =

Part of the Canterbury Tales

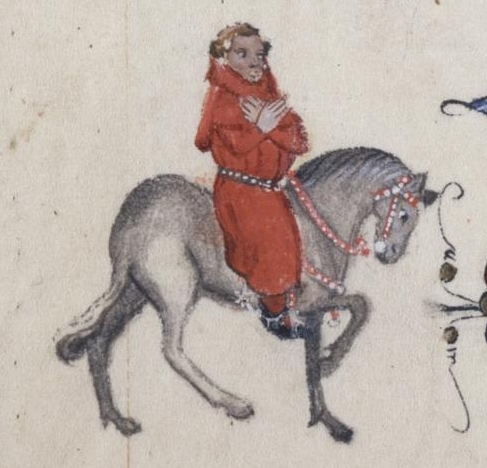
Depiction of the Parson, from the Ellesmere Manuscript.

"The Parson's Tale" is the final tale of Geoffrey Chaucer's fourteenth-century poetic cycle The Canterbury Tales. Its teller, the Parson, is a virtuous priest who takes his role as spiritual caretaker of his parish seriously. Instead of telling a story as the other pilgrims do, he delivers a treatise on penitence and the Seven Deadly Sins. This was a popular genre in the Middle Ages; Chaucer's is a translation and reworking that ultimately derives from the Latin manuals of two Dominican friars, Raymund of Pennaforte and William Perault. Modern readers and critics have found it pedantic and boring, especially in comparison to the rest of the Canterbury Tales. Some scholars have questioned whether Chaucer ever intended the "Parson's Tale" to be part of the Tales at all, but more recent scholarship understands it as integral to the work, providing an appropriate ending to a series of stories concerned with the value of fiction itself.

== Framing narrative ==
The General Prologue of the Canterbury Tales introduces the characters, a diverse group of pilgrims on the way to Canterbury Cathedral to see the shrine of Thomas Becket. While the Host, Harry Bailey, proposes a story-telling competition in which each teller will tell two tales on the way there and two on the way back to the Tabard Inn in Southwark – a total of over 100 stories – only 24 full or partial tales exist. It is unclear whether Chaucer intended to write all 120, or whether he had never intended to fulfil the promise of the General Prologue in the first place. Additionally, when Chaucer died in c. 1400 the intended order of the tales in the collection was still unclear. However, it is evident from the Parson's Prologue that – at least by the time Chaucer was writing the Prologue – it was intended to be the final tale: the competition's host, Harry Bailly, tells the Parson that he would be an ideal tale-teller to end the contest, and the Parson agrees to "knytte up al this feeste, and make an ende" ("tie up all this festivity, and make an end").

Thematically, it is linked to the Manciple's Tale, which directly precedes it in all major manuscripts. The Manciple's Tale warns against careless speech; when the host asks the Parson to tell a fable, the Parson refuses, condemning the telling of fables and referring to the Epistle to Timothy. The last two tales thus "represent a closing down of the work". By the time Chaucer was writing the Parson's Prologue, instead of following the plan of the General Prologue, which would have ended in a secular feast at the Tabard Inn in Southwark, he had chosen to end the work with the pilgrims still en route to Canterbury: instead of being judged by Harry Bailly on their storytelling, they will be judged by God on their souls.

== The Tale ==
Unlike every other tale of Canterbury, the "Parson's Tale" is not a tale at all, but rather a treatise on penitence and the Seven Deadly Sins. Citing Saint John Chrysotom, the parson divides penitence into three parts: contrition of the heart, confession of the mouth, and satisfaction (making amends). In the first part, he explains at length how a person comes to universal and total contrition. In the second, he explains the kinds of sins, and how one makes a true confession. In the third and final part, he explains how to make satisfaction for one's sins, and reminds his listeners that "the fruyt of penaunce ... is the endelees blisse of hevene" (§ 111; "the result of penance ... is the endless bliss of Heaven"). The section on the Seven Deadly Sins makes up the bulk of the text. For each sin, the Parson provides a definition, an analysis of its nature, its subtypes, and its countering virtue.

This kind of treatise was popular in the later Middle Ages, since it was decided at the Fourth Council of the Lateran (1215) that every Christian should make confession at least once a year. Initially, manuals, written in Latin, were primarily intended as reference works for confessors. By Chaucer's day, they circulated in vernacular languages, for personal, non-clerical use, as a kind of "self-help manual". Chaucer appears to have compiled the tale himself mostly from three different thirteenth-century works, translating their contents into English. He used the Summa de poenitentia of the Dominican Raymund of Pennaforte for the sections on contrition, confession, and satisfaction, inserting the material on the sins in the middle from a source that ultimately traces to the Summa vitiorum of Dominican William Perault. (Chaucer may have come to this text in a shortened form that was circulating in England at the time.) He also incorporated elements from the Summa virtutum de remediis anime, a work on the remedial virtues. Chaucer adapted and condensed these works, interspersing them with elements from proverbs and other literature. Some parts of the tale have no parallel in the sources. Since Chaucer typically follows his sources quite closely, it is possible that he had another source for the "Parson's Tale", which is either yet unknown or now lost to us. No external evidence has been found that would help scholars date the tale precisely.

It is possible that the tale was originally written outside of the context of the Canterbury Tales, and only added to them at a later date. Popular among early Chaucer scholars was the hypothesis that not only was this the case, but that Chaucer had never intended it to be part of the Tales at all. Instead, so this theory goes, Chaucer left the Parson's Prologue without a tale to follow it, and what we know of as the "Parson's Tale" was added to this gap. Some scholars have even suggested that the tale was not composed by Chaucer at all, but simply copied or translated by him for his own use, and added to the Tales after his death. While this view is no longer common, even scholars who believe the work to be Chaucer's find that it does not refer back to the rest of the Tales as one might expect, even though they include many examples of the sins that the Parson decries.

== Manuscript context ==
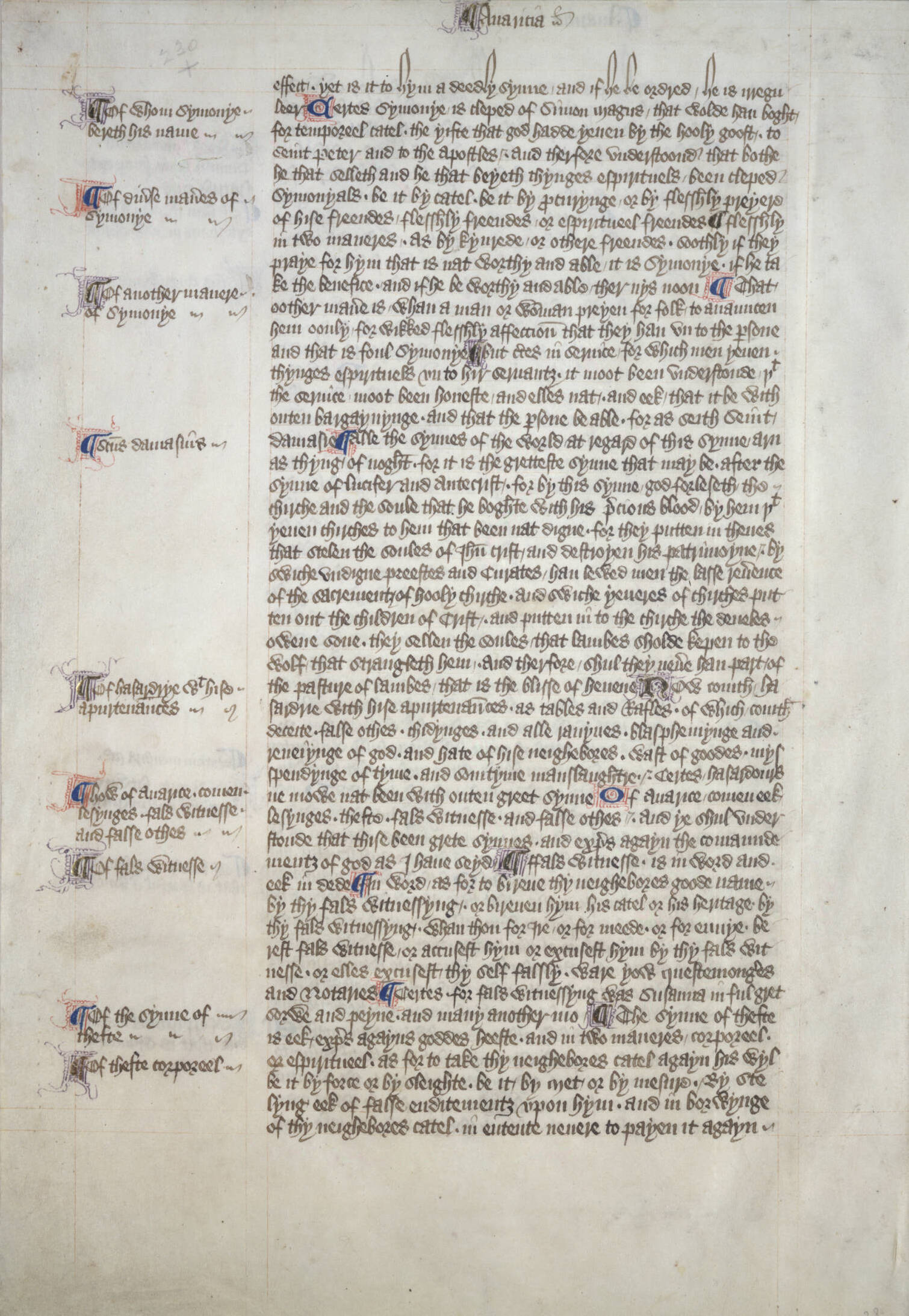
f. 224v of the Ellesmere manuscript, showing scribal marginalia.

The "Parson's Tale" is included in most manuscripts of the Canterbury Tales, but owing to its position as the final tale, damage to the manuscripts has often left it incomplete.

The scribes who copied the tale often added marginal glosses and other textual ordinatio to help readers navigate the dense paragraphs of text.

== Character of the Parson ==
A parson is a type of priest who holds a curate - a type of ecclesiastical benefice in which the holder is responsible for the care of souls, in this case the people of the parson's parish. Chaucer's Parson fulfils his role well. The General Prologue describes the Parson as, foremost, "a good man"; the implication is that, unlike other religious characters in the Tales, his vocation is subordinate to his character. He is poor in wealth, but rich in holiness. He is generous, and, rather than abandoning his benefice and heading to London, he has stayed in the countryside with his parishioners. At least according to the Narrator of the Tales, he is innocent of the common abuses of ecclesiastical office. This is in stark contrast to other contemporary portrayals of priests, such as Langland's Sloth.

The Host suggests that the Parson might be a Lollard, a follower of a reformist religious movement that is now seen as "proto-Protestant" and which has been linked to many social conflicts in 14th- and 15th-century England. Following the Host's example, scholars have examined the "Parson's Tale" for hints of Lollardy, and suggested that Chaucer himself may have held Lollard sympathies. The Parson's own vocabulary, however, is orthodox in nature. His discussion of sin is, while in depth, theologically conventional; he presents sin as a dis-ordering of the divine rules by which "alle thynges been ordeyned and nombred".

Scholars are divided on how much the "Parson's Tale" represents Chaucer's own beliefs, as opposed to imagined beliefs of the fictional character of the Parson. The Parson's portrait in the General Prologue "stresses his teaching by example rather than by precept"; unlike other characters, who use scripture for their own ends, the Parson is the only one who uses scripture for the exclusive purpose of benefiting his listeners' souls. His tale, accordingly, is somewhat drab, boring, and single-voiced. Because sin is the subversion of reason, the Parson avoids appealing to his listeners' emotions. Nevertheless, scholars have found some elements of Chaucerian style and rhetoric in the piece. Some have even taken the tale's nature as a twist of Chaucerian irony.

The General Prologue introduces the Plowman as the Parson's brother; however, the Plowman never delivers a tale.

== Interpretation ==
In general, modern readers have struggled with this tale, seeing it as a repudiation of the rest of Chaucer's work. The contrast between the previous more lively tales and the Parson's treatise has disappointed many readers; E. Talbot Donaldson, for example, wrote that "in literary terms it is ill-tempered, bad-mannered, pedantic, and joyless, and when it is used as a gloss to the other tales it distempers them, fills them with ill-humour, coats them with dust, and deprives them of joy." Reconciling this disjunction has been the focus of much of the scholarship on this tale. One such take holds that the Tales becomes increasingly concerned with speech and the value of fiction towards the end, culminating in the "Parson's Tale." Other scholars have pointed out that, rather than conflicting with the plan set out in the General Prologue, the "Parson's Tale" completes it: "after the sin comes its remedy." Taken on its own, however, although the tale is importantly located at the end of Chaucer's compilation, "its most important characteristic [is] its generality." Even Chaucer's pilgrims, who have rarely agreed on anything at all, are united as an audience to the Parson's "woordes for us alle".

== See also ==
- Penitential, a type of manual for priests hearing confessions
- Exemplum, a popular element of medieval sermons
