= The Manciple's Tale =

Part of the Canterbury Tales

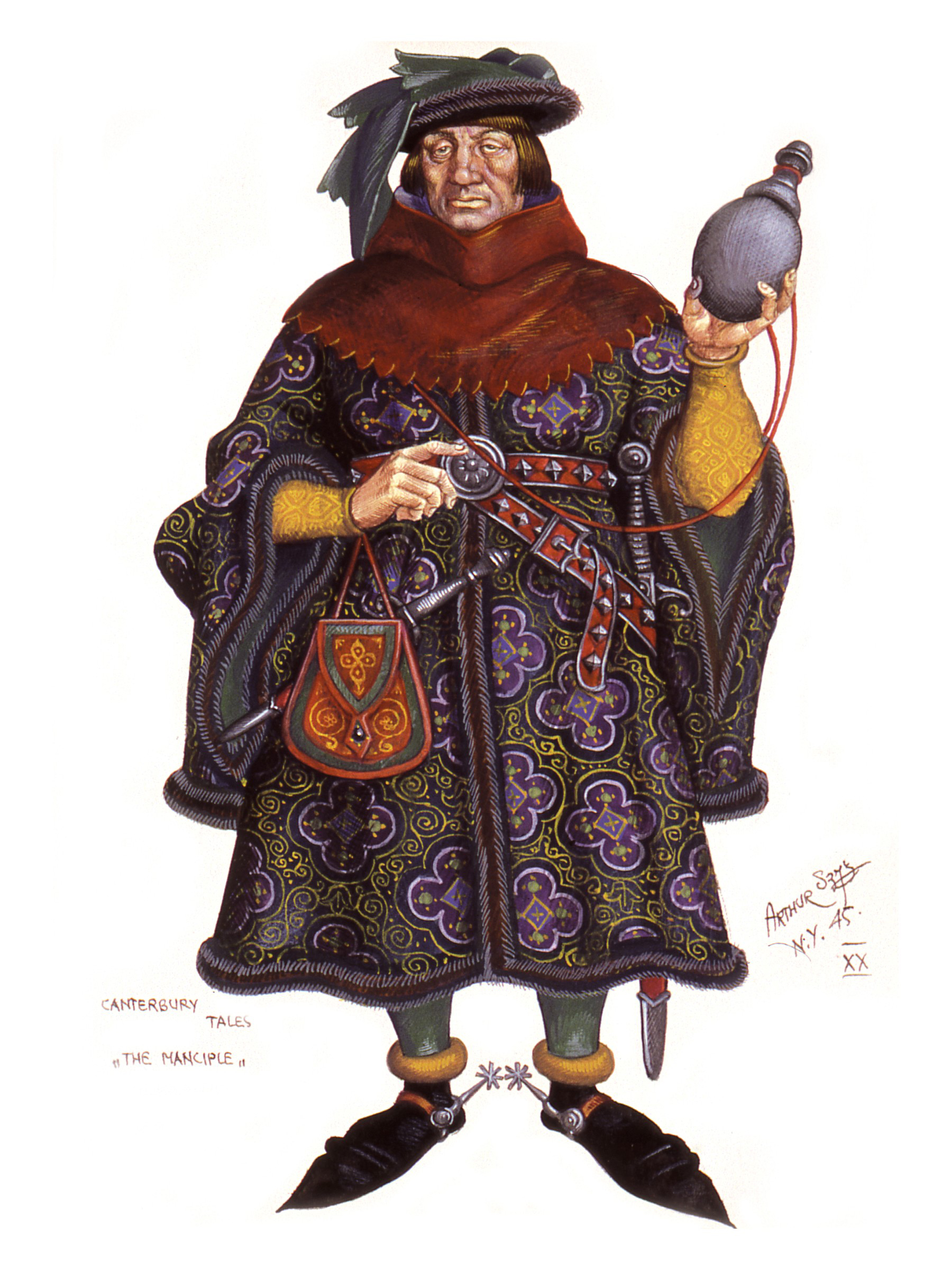
Modern illustration by Arthur Szyk, showing the Manciple dressed in a short robe and cowl. Though he holds a flask, his stern face and the multiple weapons on his belt reveal his guarded demeanor.

"The Manciple's Tale" is part of Geoffrey Chaucer's The Canterbury Tales. It tends to appear near the end of most manuscripts of the poem, and the prologue to the final tale, "The Parson's Tale", makes it clear that it was intended to be the penultimate story in the collection. The Manciple, a purchasing agent for a law court, tells a fable about Phoebus Apollo and his pet crow, which is both an origin myth explaining the crow's black feathers and a moralistic injunction against gossip.

== Prologue ==
In the tale's prologue, the Host tries to rouse the Cook to tell a tale, but he is too drunk. The Manciple insults the Cook, who falls semi-conscious from his horse, but they are reconciled by the Host and the Manciple offers the Cook another drink to make up.

== Plot ==
In the main plot of the tale, Phoebus has a crow which is all white and can speak. Phoebus also has a wife, whom he treasures but keeps shut up in his house. He is very jealous of his wife:

A good wyf, that is clene of werk and thoght,
Sholde nat been kept in noon awayt, certayn;
And trewely the labour is in vayn
To kepe a shrewe, for it wole nat bee.
This holde I for a verray nycetee,
To spille labour for to kepe wyves:
Thus writen olde clerkes in hir lyves.

The Manciple digresses to say that one cannot tame a creature to remove its essential nature; no matter how well-fed a tame cat may be, it will still attack mice instinctively. Similarly, Phoebus's wife takes a lover of low estate; the crow reveals their secret, and Phoebus in rage kills his wife. In his grief afterwards, he regrets his act and blames the crow, cursing it with black feathers and an unmelodious voice. The Manciple ends by saying it is best to hold one's tongue, and not to say anything malicious even if it is true.

== Sources ==
The ultimate source for the tale is Ovid's Metamorphoses. Chaucer probably knew several French versions, such as that in the Ovide moralisé and Machaut's Voir dit. Adaptations were popular in Chaucer's time, such as one in John Gower's Confessio Amantis.
