= The Pardoner's Tale =

Part of the Canterbury Tales

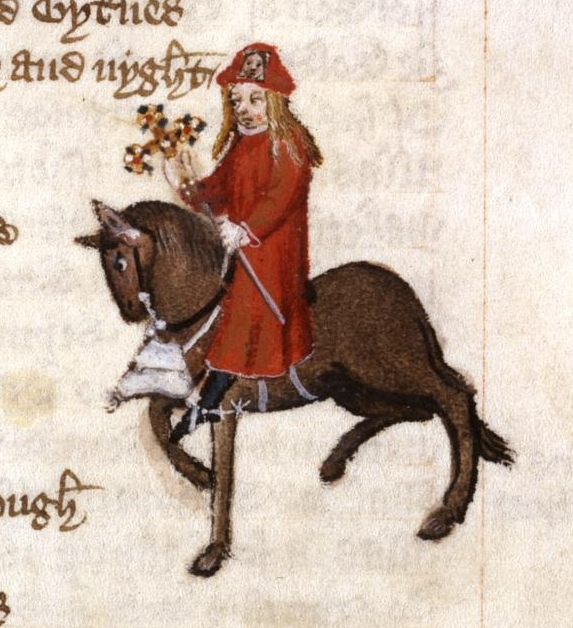
The Pardoner, from Ellesmere Manuscript of Chaucer

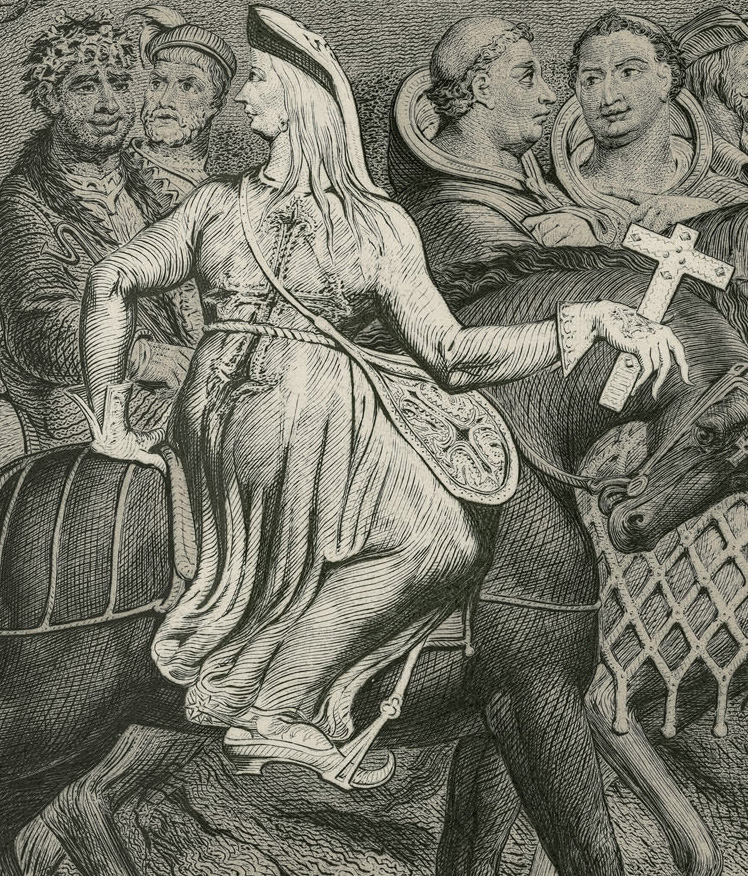
The Pardoner, as depicted by William Blake in The Canterbury Pilgrims (1810)

"The Pardoner's Tale" is one of The Canterbury Tales by Geoffrey Chaucer. In the order of the Tales, it comes after The Physician's Tale and before The Shipman's Tale; it is prompted by the Host's desire to hear something positive after the physician's depressing tale. The Pardoner initiates his Prologue—briefly accounting his methods of swindling people—and then proceeds to tell a moral tale.

The tale itself is an extended exemplum. Setting out to kill Death, three young men encounter an Old Man who says they will find him under a nearby tree. When they arrive they discover a hoard of treasure and decide to stay with it until nightfall and carry it away under the cover of night. Out of greed, they murder one another. The tale and prologue are primarily concerned with what the Pardoner says is his "theme": Radix malorum est cupiditas ("Greed is the root of [all] evils").

== Frame ==
In the order of The Canterbury Tales, the Pardoner's Prologue and Tale are preceded by "The Physician's Tale". This is a harrowing tale about a judge who plots with a "churl [low fellow]" to abduct a beautiful young woman. Rather than allow her to be raped, her father beheads her. The invitation for the Pardoner to tell a tale comes after the Host declares his dissatisfaction with the depressing tale, and declares:

... but [unless] I have triacle [medicine],
Or elles a draughte of moyste [fresh] and corny [strong] ale,
Or but I heere anon a myrie tale,
Myn herte is lost for pitee of this mayde. (lines 314–17)

The Host then asks the Pardoner to "telle us som myrthe or japes [joke, jest] right anon". However, the pilgrims—aware of pardoners' notoriety for telling lewd tales and in anticipation of hearing something objectionable—voice their desire for no ribaldry, but instead want a moral tale.

== Synopsis ==
=== Prologue ===
The prologue takes the form of a literary confession in the same manner as The Wife of Bath's Prologue. However, rather than an apology for his vices, the Pardoner boasts of his duping of his victims, for whom he has nothing but contempt. He says that his "theme"—biblical text for a sermon—is Radix malorum est cupiditas ("Greed is the root of [all] evils", 1 Timothy 6.10). He explains that his false credentials consist of official letters from high-ranking church officials and a superficial use of a few Latin words; then he will produce some "relics", and claim that among them is a bone which has miraculous powers when dipped into a well and a mitten for which:

He that his hand wol putte in this mitayn,
He shal have multipliyng of his greyn, (lines 373–374)

But he will warn that any person that "hath doon synne horrible" will not be able to benefit from these relics. The Pardoner says to the pilgrims that by these tricks he has acquired a considerable sum of money of a hundred marks (£66 13s. 4d., about ten times the salary of the average schoolmaster) a year. He goes on to relate how he stands like a cleric at the pulpit, and preaches against avarice only to gain the congregation's money; he does not care for the correction of sin or for their souls. Against anyone that offends either him or other pardoners, he will "stynge hym with my tonge smerte". Although he is guilty of avarice himself, he reiterates that his theme is always Radix malorum ... and that he can nonetheless preach so that others turn away from the vice and repent—though his "principal entente" is for personal gain.

The Pardoner explains that he then offers many anecdotes to the "lewed [ignorant, unlearned] people".; from long experience he can tell who are the worst sinners (because of their guilty expressions) and thus who are most eager buyers of his fake relics. He scorns the thought of living in poverty while he preaches; he desires "moneie, wolle [wool], chese, and whete" and does not care whether it were from the poorest widow in the village, even should her children starve for famine. Yet, he concludes to the pilgrims, though he may be a "ful vicious man", he can tell a moral tale and proceeds.

=== Tale ===
The tale is set in Flanders at an indeterminate time, and opens with three young men who spend their time patronizing brothels and taverns while playing at eating, drinking, rioting, and gambling; this day they are engaged in blaspheming in a tavern. The Pardoner condemns each of these "tavern sins" in turn—gluttony, drinking, gambling, and swearing—with support from the Christian scriptures, before proceeding with the tale. The rioters hear a bell signalling a burial; upon inquiry they are told the funeral is that of an old drinking friend of theirs who the night before has been killed by a "privee theef" known as Death, who has also killed a thousand others in a nearby community.

The men set out to avenge their friend and kill Death. An ancient man they brusquely query tells them that he has asked Death to take him but has failed, as no one wishes to trade their youth for his great age. He then says they can find Death at the foot of an oak tree and also warns them "God save you, Who redeemed all humankind, And mend your ways!". When the men arrive at the tree, they find a large hoard of eight bushels of gold florins coins and forget about their quest to kill Death.

They decide to take the coins to their homes at night for if any see them with the treasure by day, they would be accused of robbery and hanged. The three men draw straws to see who among them should fetch wine and food while the other two wait under the tree. The youngest of the three men draws the shortest straw and departs; while he is away, the remaining two plot to overpower and both stab him upon his return. However, the one who leaves for town plots to kill the other two to keep the treasure all for himself and does not repent: he purchases rat poison and laces the wine. When he returns with the food and drink, the other two kill him and then consume the poisoned wine, dying slow and painful deaths.

Having completed his tale, the Pardoner—forgetful of his remarks during the prologue—falls into the habit of appealing [to an audience] for gold and silver so that the pilgrims may receive pardons for their sins. The Host responds that he would sooner castrate the Pardoner than kiss his relics. At this point the Knight intervenes and urges them to make peace.

== Sources and composition ==
The prologue—taking the form of a literary confession—was most probably modelled on that of "Faus Semblaunt" in the medieval French poem Roman de la Rose. The tale of the three rioters is a version of a folk tale with a "remarkably wide range" and has numerous analogues: ancient Buddhist, Persian, and African. The Dove's tale from Night 152 of the One Thousand and One Nights about the wealthy merchant from Sindah and the two swindlers who poison one another is also very similar to this story.

== Analysis ==
The relationship between tellers and tale is distinctly significant in "The Pardoner's Tale". The Pardoner is an enigmatic character, portrayed as grotesque in the General Prologue. He is seemingly aware of his sin – it is not clear why he tells the pilgrims about his sin in the prologue before his tale commences. His preaching is correct and the results of his methods, despite their corruption, are good. The Pardoner's confession is similar to that of the Wife of Bath in that there is a revelation of details buried within the prologue.

Chaucer describes the Pardoner as an excellent speaker in his portrait of the character in the General Prologue to The Canterbury Tales, which inherently reflects the quality of the narrative attributed to him.

The old man who appears before the rioters has been the subject of considerable debate. Many people and scholars reference him as "death in person", "the Wandering Jew", "Old Age itself", and "Death's messenger". W. J. B. Owen points out that "He is seeking Death; and that Death or his agent should find death is contrary to all the logic of allegory." Owen argues that the character is merely an old man and not a symbol of mortality.

The Old Man in "The Pardoner's Tale" is often written off as one who does not provide any sort of substance to the play. However, critic Alfred David denies such claims and asserts the possibility that the Old Man in "The Pardoner's Tale" is meant to symbolise more than unambiguous death, "the old man's identity does not admit a simple, unambiguous, and definitive answer such as Death or Death's Messenger". David goes on to assert that the Old Man may actually symbolise the "Wandering Jew" as defined to be a symbol of death that will supposedly roam the Earth until the Second Coming of Jesus Christ. One may compare this notion to the symbol and character of the Old Man in The Rime of the Ancient Mariner by Samuel Taylor Coleridge.

"The Pardoner's Tale" finds itself widely debated among those in the literary world. The question of Chaucer's motivation in writing the tale, as well as potential social comments made within it, have been the subject of controversy. Gregory W. Gross in Modern Language Studies concludes that The Pardoner finds himself publicly shamed by the Host's reprimand at the end of the tale. There is an "undertone" of exclusion at this point in the work that, perhaps, leads to the question of the sexuality of The Pardoner and the social boundaries at hand. To reaffirm his claim, Gross points out the ridicule and "laughter" on behalf of the other pilgrims. Perhaps Chaucer is looking upon the Pardoner with a "compassionate eye", as the Host offers a kiss at the end of the tale. According to Gross, this could simply be the poet's way of easing the tension in the room, thus a sign of "compassion" towards the embarrassment of the Pardoner on behalf of the poet. Ultimately, it is plausible that Chaucer makes a societal statement long before his time that serves as a literary teaching moment in modern time.

In further analysis, psychological patterns of the character of the Pardoner are frequently analysed by readers and critics alike. In 1961, critic Eric W. Stockton defined the psychology-based research of the character, "The psychology of the Pardoner has perhaps gotten in the way of the task of interpreting the stories' meaning. This is indeed an age of psychology." As Stockton states, the character has largely been overanalysed, especially amidst mid-century advances in psychoanalysis in the 1960s and 1970s.

== Character of the teller ==
The religious climate at the time that Chaucer wrote this piece was pre-Reformation. Therefore, the Sacraments were still largely considered, as explained by St. Augustine, "outward and visible signs of an inward and invisible grace". The suggestion that outward appearances are reliable indicators of internal character was not considered radical or improper among contemporary audiences. Indeed, the vivid depiction of the Pardoner's hair, those locks "yellow as wax But smoothe as a strike [hank] of flex [flax]", does little to improve the reader's opinion of his moral character.

Chaucer develops his description and analysis of the Pardoner throughout "The Pardoner's Tale" using suggestive analogies that provide the reader with the perception of a man of extreme sexual and spiritual poverty, willingly admitting that he abuses his authority and sells fake relics. "The Pardoner's Tale" matches the unctuous nature of the Pardoner in many ways. Eugene Vance illustrates one parallel effectively fostered by Chaucer's sexual innuendos. He writes: "The kneeling posture to which the Pardoner summons the pilgrims would place their noses right before his deficient crotch."

In addition, Vance expands upon this comparison, identifying a sexual innuendo implicit in the Pardoner's many relics. "The pardoner conspires to set himself up as a moveable shrine endowed with relics unsurpassed by those of anyone else in England." Yet, of course, the relics are all fakes, creating a suggestion of both the Pardoner's impotence and his spiritual ill-worth.

== General themes ==
Though the Pardoner preaches against greed, the irony of the character is based in the Pardoner's hypocritical actions. He admits extortion of the poor, pocketing of indulgences, and failure to abide by teachings against jealousy and avarice. He also admits quite openly that he tricks the most guilty sinners into buying his spurious relics and does not really care what happens to the souls of those he has swindled.

The Pardoner is also deceptive in how he carries out his job. Instead of selling genuine relics, the bones he carries belong to pigs, not departed saints. The cross he carries appears to be studded with precious stones that are, in fact, bits of common metal. This irony could be an indication to Chaucer's dislike for religious profit—a pervasive late medieval theme hinging on anti-clericalism. Chaucer's use of subtle literary techniques, such as satire, seem to convey this message.

However, the Pardoner might also be seen as a reinforcement of the Apostolic Authority of the priesthood, which, according to the Catholic Church, functions fully even when the one possessing that authority is in a state of mortal sin, which in this case is supported by how the corrupt Pardoner is able to tell a morally intact tale and turn others from his same sin. Thomas Aquinas, an influential theologian of the late medieval period, had a philosophy concerning how God was able to work through evil people and deeds to accomplish good ends. Chaucer may have also been referencing a doctrine of St. Augustine of Hippo concerning the Donatist heresy of fourth and fifth century Northern Africa in which Augustine argued that a priest's ability to perform valid sacraments was not invalidated by his own sin. Thus, it is possible that with the Pardoner, Chaucer was criticising the administrative and economic practices of the Church while simultaneously affirming his support for its religious authority and dogma.

In the General Prologue of the Tales, the Pardoner is introduced with these lines:

With hym ther rood a gentil Pardoner
Of Rouncivale, his freend and his compeer,
That streight was comen fro the court of Rome.
Ful loude he soong "Com hider, love, to me!"
This Somonour bar to hym a stif burdoun ...
A voys he hadde as smal as hath a goot.
No berd hadde he, ne nevere sholde have;
As smothe it was as it were late shave.
I trowe he were a geldyng or a mare.

The last three lines indicate that the narrator thought the Pardoner to be either a eunuch ("geldyng") or a homosexual.

== Adaptations ==
- The Road to Canterbury: A Game of Pilgrims, Pardoners and the Seven Deadly Sins is a board game in which players play as the Pardoner.
- The 1927 novel The Treasure of the Sierra Madre is a novelisation of this tale, which was later made into the 1948 film of the same name.
  - The 2010 video game Fallout: New Vegas further adapts The Treasure of the Sierra Madre specifically in its Dead Money downloadable content, wherein the player helps carry out a heist of the (fictional) Sierra Madre casino centuries in the making. The story follows the themes of the Pardoner's Tale.
- Rudyard Kipling in "The King's Ankus", a story in The Second Jungle Book.
- The Tale of the Three Brothers, a story featured in the Harry Potter universe, is partially based on "The Pardoner's Tale".
- The tale is adapted in Pasolini's film The Canterbury Tales. Robin Askwith plays Rufus, Martin Whelar plays Jack the Justice, John McLaren plays Johnny the Grace, Edward Monteith plays Dick the Sparrow and Alan Webb plays the old man who sends them to Death.
- The tale is adapted in Assassin's Creed Valhalla as a world event that the protagonist, Eivor, encounters. Death is represented by the Old Man that Eivor meets. Eivor pieces together the tale by solving the mystery of what happened to the three young men by the Large Oak.
- The text and an animated retelling appear and serve as vital clues in the 2010 British found footage mystery short film Internet Story.
