= The Shipman's Tale =

Part of the Canterbury Tales

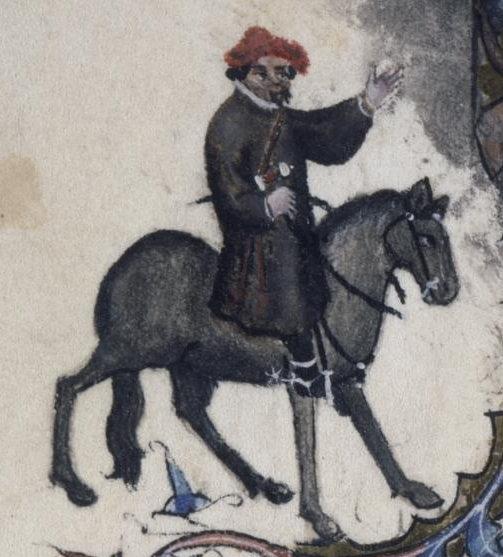
The Shipman from the Ellesmere Chaucer

"The Shipman's Tale" (also called "The Sailor's Tale") is one of The Canterbury Tales by Geoffrey Chaucer.

It is in the form of a fabliau and tells the story of a merchant, his wife and her lover, a monk. Although similar stories can be found in Boccaccio's Decameron, a frequent source for Chaucer's tales, the story is a retelling of a common type of folktale called "the lover's gift regained".

== Plot ==
The tale tells of a merchant whose wife enjoys revelry and socializing, on which she spends money. A young monk, who is close friends with the merchant, comes to stay with them. After confessing that she does not love her husband, the wife asks the monk for one hundred franks to pay her debts. The monk, without her knowledge, borrows the money from the merchant to give to the wife, at which point she agrees with the monk:

"That for thise hundred frankes he sholde al nyght
Have hire in his armes bolt upright;" (lines 315–316)

The monk volunteers the information that he has returned the loan to the wife a few days after he had borrowed it, and then leaves town. When the merchant asks his wife about the money, she says it has been spent on clothing and blames the monk saying that she thought the money was in payment for him being such a long house guest. Instead of giving her husband the money back she says she will repay the debt in bed. As the wife is tallying her debt in bed the story ends on a bawdy pun that all should "tally" the rest of their lives.

== Themes ==
Apart from a criticism of the clergy, a common theme of Chaucer's, the tale also connects money, business and sex. Similar tales often end with both the wife and husband being conned, but the addition of the wife, in turn, conning her husband seems to be Chaucer's own embellishment.

The use of the pronouns "us" and "we" when talking from a woman's perspective, along with the wife's success at the end of the tale, has led scholars to suggest that the tale was originally written for the Wife of Bath but as that character developed she was given a more fitting story and the Shipman took on this tale. In the line "he moot us clothe, and he moot us array," (line 12) and others, "us" and "we" are used, in a way that could be interpreted as a married woman speaking for other wives. It is also possible The Shipman may simply be imitating a female voice, but the epilogue of "The Man of Law's Tale" in some manuscripts suggests it should be followed by the Shipman's tale rather than the Wife of Bath, whose tale usually follows. The changes give some insight into Chaucer's development of the tales and the connections between them.

=== Historical context ===
It is likely that the career in the late-14th century of Dartmouth-based privateer John Hawley provided Chaucer with the historical basis for his character.

== BBC adaptation ==
In the BBC1 adaptation of "The Shipman's Tale" (renamed "The Sea Captain's Tale"), setting is changed to modern England and the protagonists are an Indian family. The monk's role is played by the merchant's business partner, who has come from India to set up a shop in England. The wife, beset by money problems, sleeps with this man, who learns of her previous affairs through the merchant. The business partner breaks up with the wife, and she, feeling jilted, smashes his shop. The merchant subsequently sends the other man back to India with a warning, and at the end he reaches across the bed to touch his wife's hand, a hint of possible reconciliation.
