= Palamon =

Palamon may refer to:

- A fictional character from:
  - The Knight's Tale
  - Palamon and Arcite
  - Palamon and Arcite (Edwardes)
  - The Two Noble Kinsmen

== See also ==
- Palaemon (disambiguation)
