= Anne de Graville =

French Renaissance poet

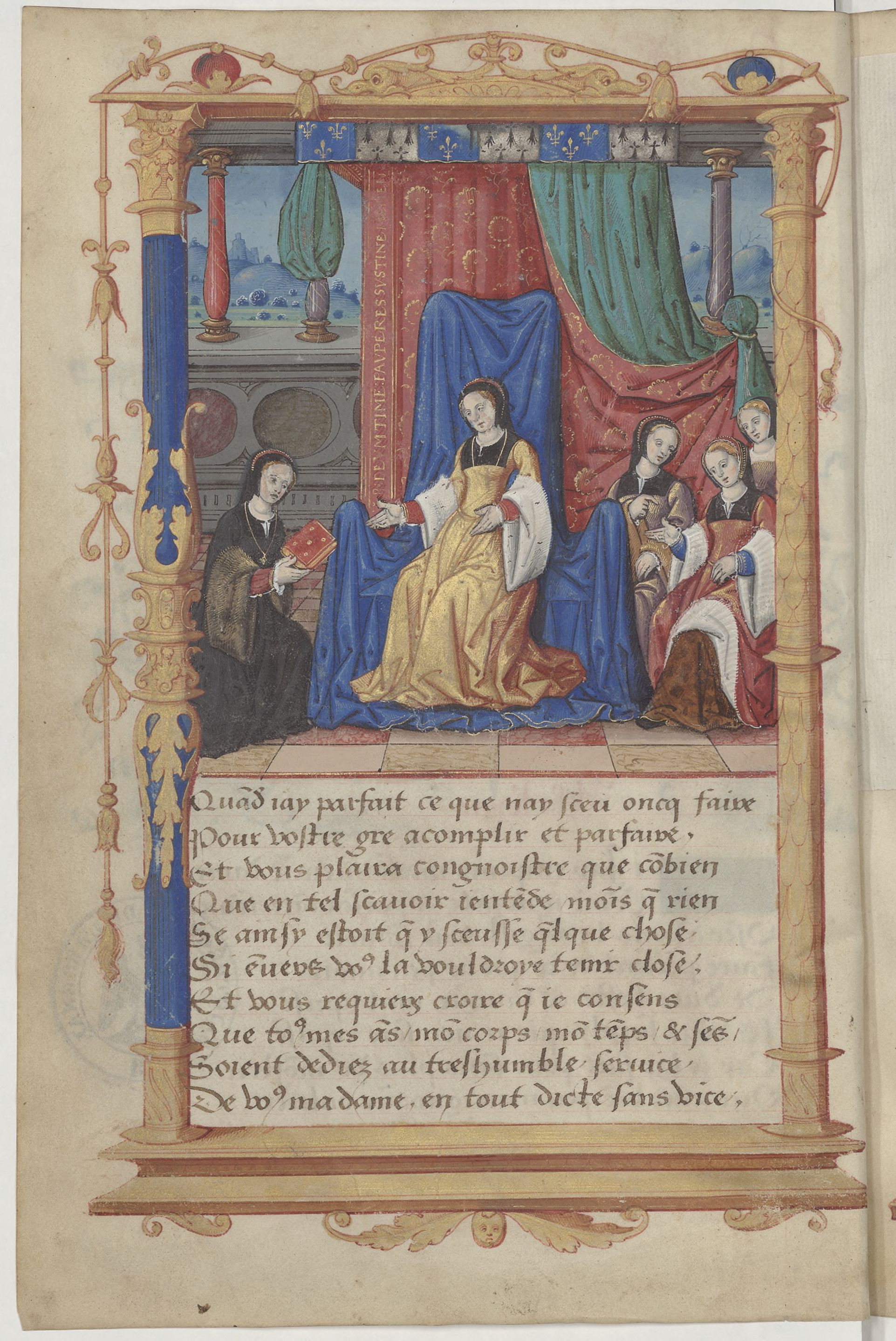
Miniature dedication of the Roman de Palamon et Arcita: Anne de Graville presents her work to Queen Claude of France, Étienne Colaud, Bibliothèque de l'Arsenal, Ms.5116, f.1V.

Anne de Graville or Anne Malet de Graville (c. 1490 – c. 1540) was a French Renaissance poet, translator, and book collector, associated with the court of Queen Claude of France. She was born into one of the most prominent families in the country and overcame scandal to become a well-respected literary figure at the royal court. In addition to authoring two texts, she was an avid collector of books and manuscripts.

== Early life ==
Anne was born around 1490 into the Malet de Graville family, one of the most wealthy and prestigious families in France. She was the youngest of three surviving girls: Louise, Jeanne and Anne. Both of her brothers died early. Her father, the admiral Louis Malet de Graville who served three kings in his lifetime, and her mother Marie de Balsac, raised her at the family estate not far from Paris, the Chateau of Marcoussis. This was the estate where the future king Francis I enjoyed hunting. There Anne received a classical education and learned to read and write in French, Italian, and Latin. She had access to her father's expansive library for her studies and became an avid bibliophile and book collector herself.

It is said that she was very beautiful with blond hair and dark eyes. She had a beautiful singing voice for which she was celebrated at court.

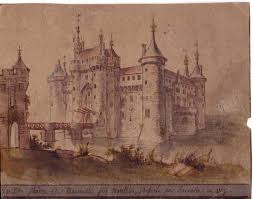
The Château of Marcoussy (or Montagu) where Anne was raised.

== Marriage ==
Around 1507, Pierre de Balsac d'Entragues, the son of Robert de Balsac and cousin to Anne on her mother's side, fell in love with her. He arranged a kidnapping (apparently with her consent) from the Chateau de Marcoussis. They married secretly, around 1508. Because of her marriage, Anne incurred her father’s disappointment and wrath; he sued the couple, leading to lengthy lawsuits and disinheritance. The chaplain of Louis de Graville intervened to reconcile Anne with her father in return for a renunciation of her inheritance, a fixed sum of money and an annual pension. At her father’s death in 1516 she sued the estate and regained the right to her third of the inheritance after her father’s death. After 1518 Anne and Pierre were awarded their part of her father’s possessions, including domains in Normandy and central France, a grand house in Paris, and most importantly, a large portion of Louis Malet de Graville’s extensive library, which she further developed with her own acquisitions.

== Life at Court ==
Not long after her marriage, Anne de Graville served at the court of Queen Claude of France, eldest daughter of Louis XII and Anne of Brittany; Claude became the wife of the future Francis I in 1514, the year before he ascended the throne. Anne was likely her dame d'honneur. Queen Claude's court was notable for its austere and respectable modes of life which contrasted with the promiscuous ways of her husband. She created and dedicated several texts to the queen during her tenure there, from 1515 to 1524.

After the death of the Queen Claude in 1524, Anne moved to her husband's estates to raise her family. During this time she became a confidant of Francis I's sister, princess and poet Marguerite de Navarre. Like the princess, Anne became interested in religious reform and even sheltered several Reformation exiles.

== Mottos ==
- Musas natura, lacrymas fortuna (From Nature comes the Muses, but from Fortune, tears), formulated from the circumstances of her life in which she was blessed by Nature with the literary inspiration of the Muses, but cursed by Fortune and her father to hardship and tears.
- J'en garde un leal (I keep a loyal one), an anagram of her name, that probably refers to her beloved husband.

== Literary works ==
=== La belle dame sans mercy ===
This work, produced probably before 1525, is the major reason for Anne de Graville's inclusion in the history of French literature. The collection of seventy-one rondeaux was revised from the poem originally written one hundred years earlier by Alain Chartier (in 1424), updating the narrative and neutral octosyllabic form of Alain’s poem to a lyrical and courtly form of rondeaux. The text of the poems are preserved in a single manuscript housed at the French National Library (Bibliothèque nationale de France) in Paris with the shelf mark of français 2253. The dialogue between Lover and Lady reflects a softening of the attitude of the Lady toward her pleading courtier, rendering it more acceptable to a Renaissance audience. A modern edition was published by Carl Wahlund in 1897.

=== Le beau roman des deux amans Palamon & Arcita et de la belle et sage Emilia ===
"translaté de vieil langaige et prose en nouveau et rime par madamoiselle Anne de Graville la Mallet, dame du Boys Maslesherbes, du commandement de la Royne" (1521). This "translated" tale was adapted from the Teseida délie Nozze d'Emilia of Italian author Giovanni Boccaccio. The Italian work also inspired Chaucer's "Knight's Tale". Anne's story tells of the amorous rivalry between Palamon and Arcite, best friends, who both wish to earn the hand of Emilia, the younger sister of Hippolyta, queen of the Amazons. Emilia has accompanied her sister and the victorious Theseus to Athens where they witness the dueling between the two rivals. Arcite wins the duel, but then dies tragically from his wounds before the couple can marry. Theseus advises Emilia to wed Palamon in order the make the best of the tragic situation.

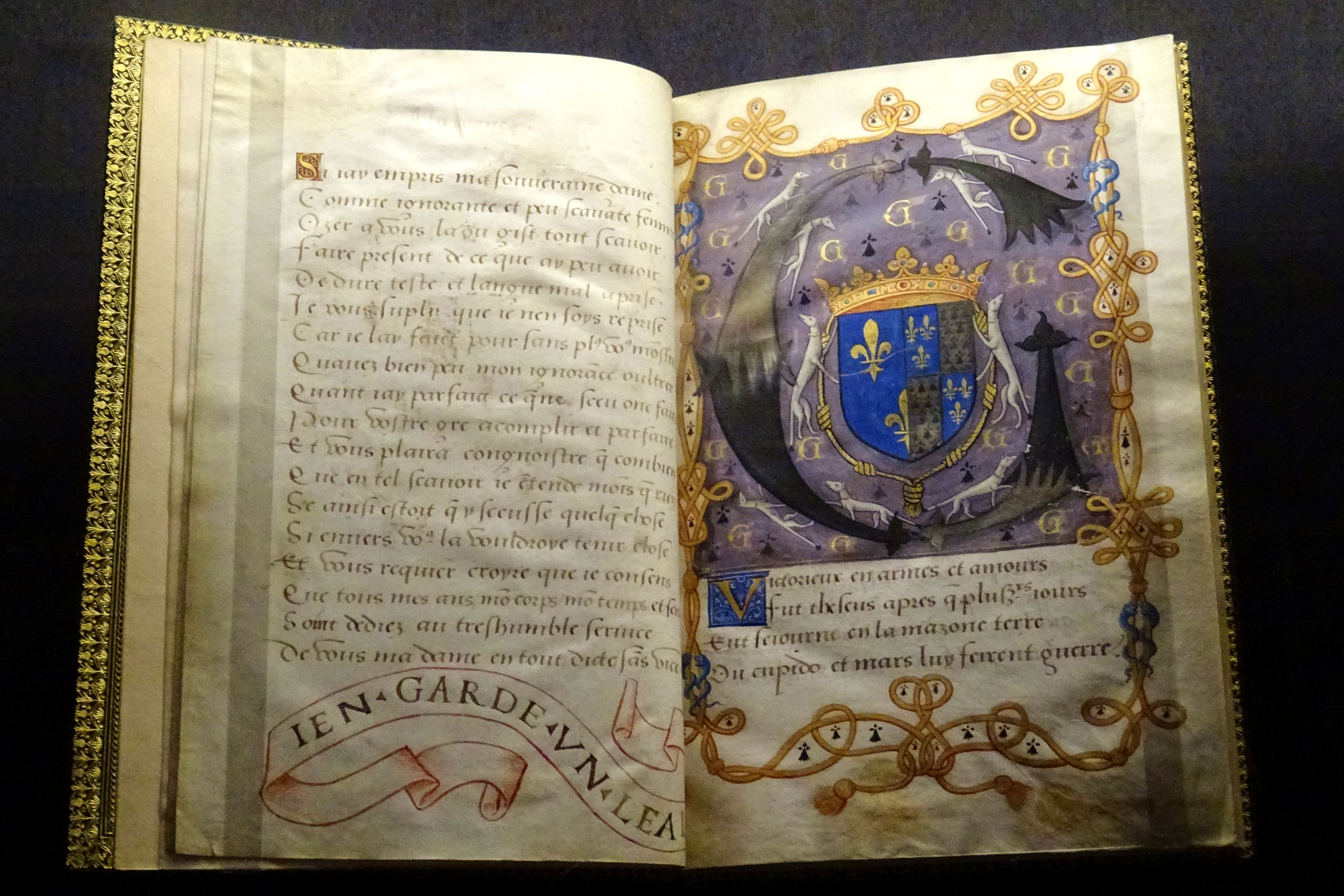
Anne de Graville, Histoire de Palamon et Archita, France, circa 1518-24, inv. 513. Bibliothèque Condé.

The translation was commissioned by Queen Claude and dedicated to her. Six manuscripts of this work survive today with the library shelf marks of Paris, bibliothèque de l'Arsenal, 5116; Paris, Bibliothèque nationale de France, français 1397 and 25441; Paris, Bibliothèque nationale de France n.a.f., 6513 and n.a.fr., 719 and Chantilly, Musée Condé, 1570. A modern edition and critical apparatus has been prepared and published by Yves Le Hir (PUF, 1965).

== Library ==
Anne was not only a writer, she was also a collector of manuscripts. Her library reveals her interests and her knowledge base. She inherited most of her father's collection and purchased many more. Included in these manuscripts are:

- Munich, Bayerische Staatsbibliothek, Cod. gall. 11, Christine de Pizan's Mutacion de Fortune
- Paris, Arsenal 3172, Christine de Pizan's Mutacion de Fortune
- Paris, Bibliothèque nationale, 254, Le livre de la destruction de Troyes.
- Paris, Bibliothèque nationale, 20350, Grandes Chroniques de France
- Paris, Bibliothèque nationale, 22541, Les triomphes de Pétrarque
- Paris, Bibliothèque nationale, 20853, Recueil de pièces sur les croisades et les guerres françaises, sur la population de la France et l'hôtel du roi
- Paris, Bibliothèque nationale, 22548-550, Les sept sages de Rome.
- Paris, Bibliothèque nationale, 23932, Inventaire général des meubles de Charles V
- Paris, Bibliothèque nationale, 25535, Chants royaux, rondeaux et ballades du puy de musique de Rouen
- Paris, Bibliothèque nationale, nouv. acq. 1880, Voyages de Marco Polo, inherited from her father
- Paris, Arsenal 2691, Recueil de différentes pièces, including Le livre de Mellibée et de Prudence sa femme
- Paris, Arsenal 3511, Voyages de Marco Polo, in the margins are written Anne's mottos
- Paris, Arsenal 2776, Les Voeux du Paon and Le Rester du Paon, bought by Anne in Rouen
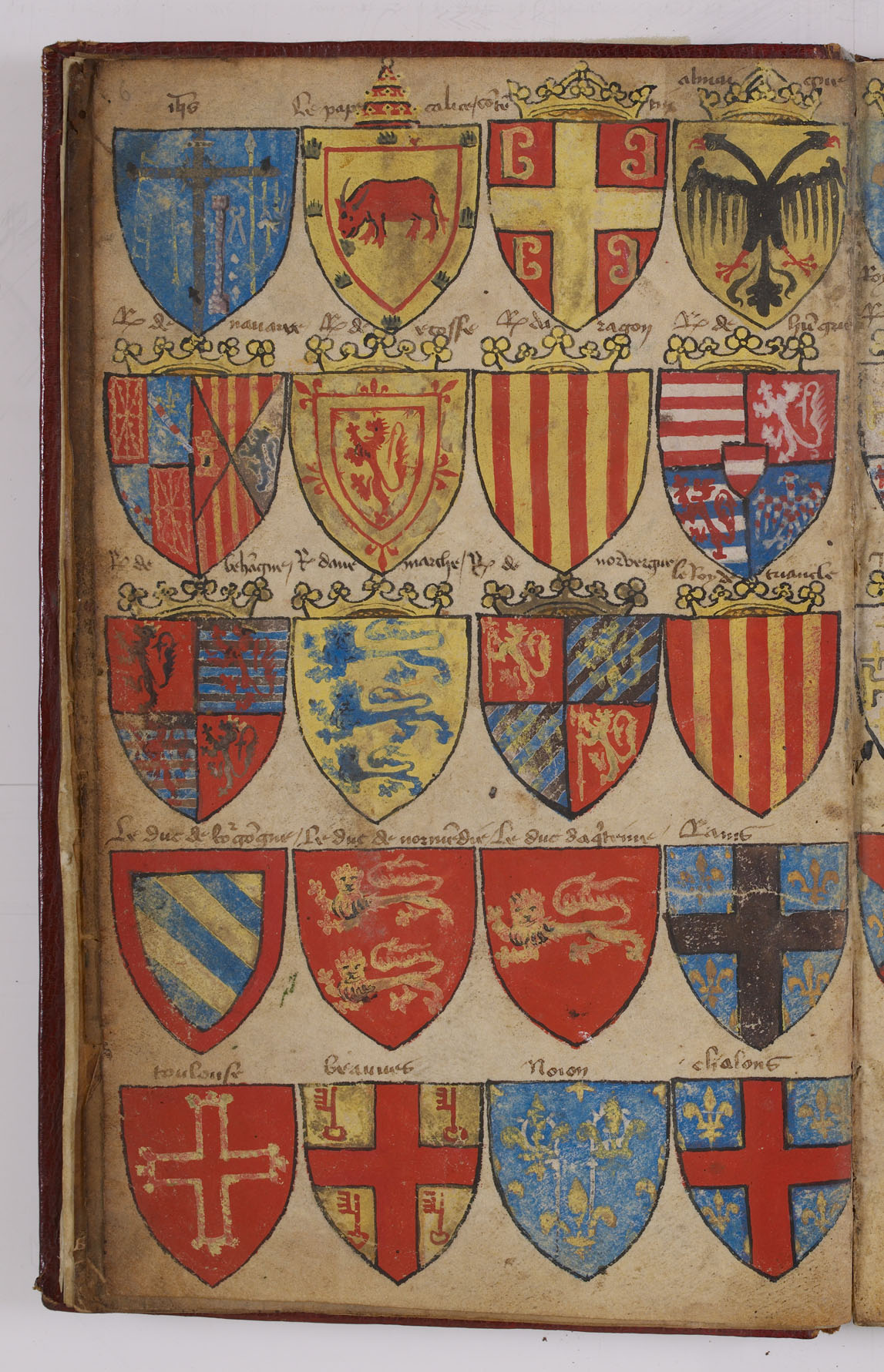
  Page 5 of the Armorial Le Breton owned by Anne
- The Armorial Le Breton, the oldest illustrated armorial preserved in France.

== Posterity ==
After her death around 1540, her daughter Jeanne of Balsac-Entragues, married to Claude d'Urfé, inherited her collection of books, enhancing considerably the library of her famously bibliophilic husband. Four of the 21 books identified as having come from the Graville collection display Anne de Graville's motto: J'en garde un léal.

Anne de Graville was celebrated in a 2022 exposition held at the Chateau de Blois entitled "Renaissance of Women."
