= Battle of Montlhéry =

Franco-Burgundian conflict of Louis XI

- Part of War of the Public Weal
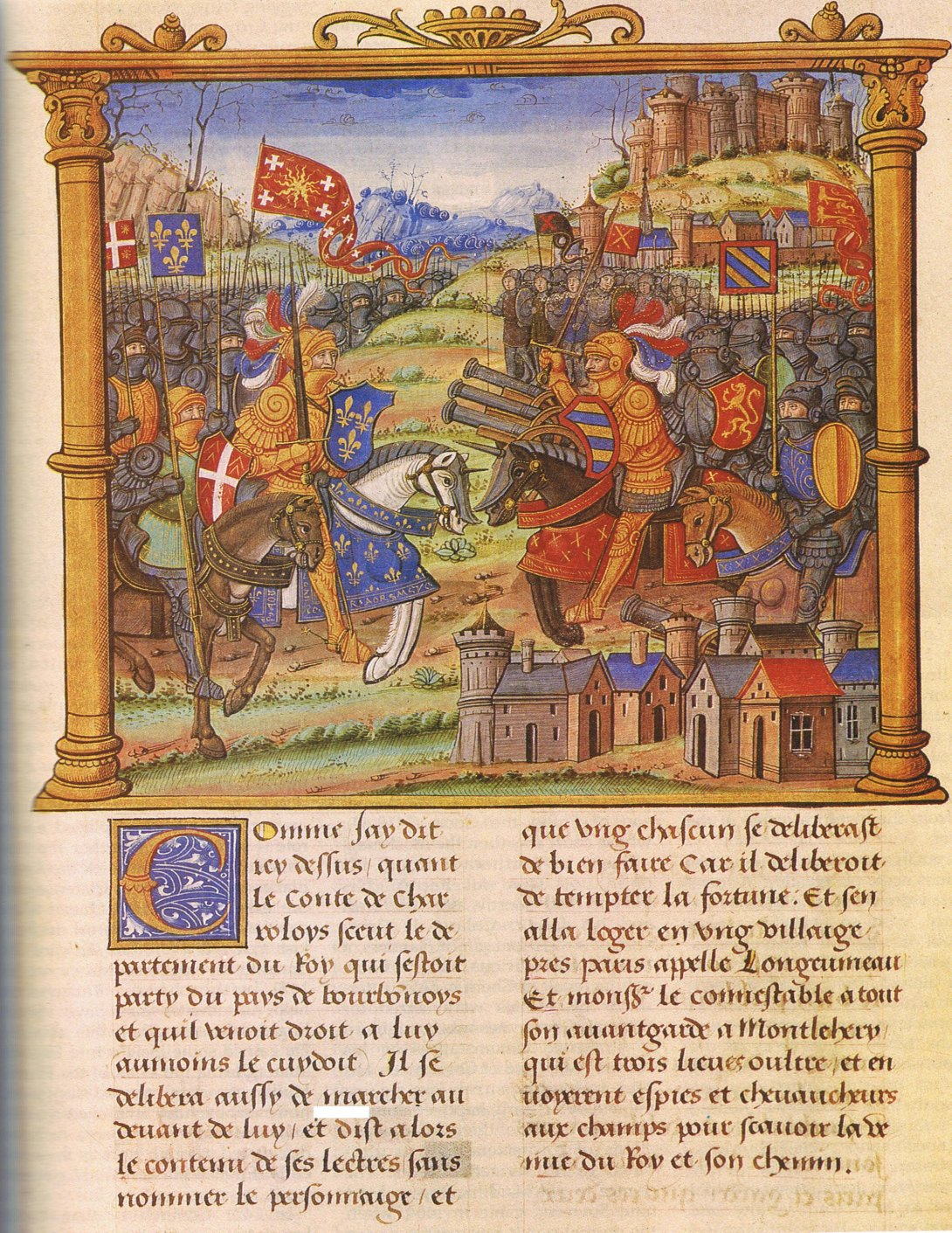
- Miniature by Étienne Colaud from the Mémoires de Philippe de Commines
Date	16 July 1465
Location	Between Montlhéry and Longjumeau, south of Paris
Result	Indecisive – see article text

Belligerents
Burgundian State	Valois

Commanders and leaders
Charles, Count of Charolais	Louis XI of France; Charles, Count of Maine; Pierre de Brézé †

Strength
c. 20,000	c. 15,000

Casualties and losses
2,000	2,000

The Battle of Montlhéry was fought between Louis XI and the League of the Public Weal on 16 July 1465 in the vicinity of Longpont-sur-Orge. It had no clear winner and therefore did not decide the war.

== Insurgency of the Vassal countries ==
Philip the Good had supported and even hosted Louis XI during his dispute with his father Charles VII. Still, or possibly even because he knew him that well after having lived for four years at his court, Louis XI resented the ambitions of Philip, who relentlessly expanded his duchy and behaved like a king in his own right. Louis XI had already been King of France for four years when Philip the Good, henceforth represented by his son Charles the Bold, Count of Charolais, allied with John II, Duke of Bourbon and Francis II, Duke of Brittany. Together, they assembled an army that was considered strong enough to extort independence from Louis XI.

== Preliminary skirmishes ==
Louis XI was backed up by Gaston IV, Count of Foix, the big cities, and all provinces (like Languedoc, Normandy, Champagne, Dauphiné, and others). His army grew rapidly and enforced Picardy's border to Burgundy. He put the defence of this border into the hands of Joachim Rouault, sent Charles, Count of Maine (his uncle) with twelve thousand soldiers against the ruler of Brittany and took the rest of his army (including the Scottish Guard) in April against the Bourbons. After he had conquered Moulins the Duke of Bourbon and other members of the League of the Public Weal signed a peace treaty on the King's terms. The Burgundians arrived at the end of May in Champagne and reached Saint-Denis on 5 July. Not meeting any resistance they marched further and eventually attacked Paris. Brittany's army arrived on 13 July at Beaugency and intended to join forces with the Burgundians and to attack the King's army with a force of 35,000 men. Confronted with an invasion of Champagne and an attack on Paris at the same time, Louis XI split his army. His infantry and artillery kept marching toward Burgundy but he went north while Paris was already surrounded by enemies. Eventually he and his uncle, the comte du Maine, attacked Brittany's army from two sides and successfully hindered it from fusing with the Burgundians. On the night of 14–15 July the army of Louis XI rejoined the forces led by his uncle. Together they prepared for battle.

== Battle ==
After a hard march that left parts of his army behind, Louis XI and his men arrived by dawn at Étampes. The King had 15,000 soldiers at his side, mainly cavalry. He was facing an enemy who had 20,000 men and substantial artillery. The King's men were determined to battle but their enemies weren't. The artillery took its toll among the King's lines but his soldiers stood their ground. During the following battle many fighters on both sides sought duels in the middle of the area between both armies, trying to distinguish themselves. Also, single groups on both sides went occasionally forward, seeking combat, but returned to their original places once they had had their fights. At 14 o'clock Louis XI decided to march forward. Pierre de Brézé who held the right wing of the Royal Army would go first then Louis would attack the centre of the enemy's army while his was uncle would attack at last. Pierre de Brézé managed to break through the lines and in the course of the subsequent disorder Louis XI in his turn attacked the heart of the enemy army. When Pierre de Brézé fell in combat, his enraged men annihilated everybody who stood in their way. However, the men under the command of his uncle didn't do so well and spoiled the victory by effectively avoiding direct contact with the enemy. The Count of Maine was eventually hunted down by his counterparts, led by Charles the Bold himself. Instead of a victory, Louis XI encountered chaos. He was even thrown off his horse. Finally his enemies retreated after all, but his own forces were too scattered and in no condition to pursue them. The Count of Maine also escaped from his pursuers.

Be that as it may, at the end of the day Louis XI had inflicted enough losses on Charles the Bold's army for the king's army to reach Paris without mishap, though leaving his adversary master of the battlefield. Eventually, Brittany's army and other members of the League of the Public Weal rejoined the Burgundian forces and together besieged the French capital (from August 19th 1465).
