= Polemon =

Polemon (or Polemo) is the name of eminent ancient Greeks:

== Philosophers ==
- Polemon of Athens, head of the Platonic Academy from 314–269 BC
- Polemon of Ilium, 2nd-century BC Stoic philosopher
- Polemon of Laodicea, 2nd-century sophist

== Macedonian officers ==
- Polemon (son of Andromenes), fl. 4th century BC
- Polemon (son of Megacles), fl. 4th century BC, Macedonian of Pella, who was one of the officers appointed by Alexander the Great to command the garrison at Memphis in 331 BC
- Polemon (son of Theramenes), fl. 4th century BC

== Kings and other monarchs ==
- Polemon I of Pontus, king of Pontus from 36 BC to AD 8
- Polemon II of Pontus, son to the above, king of Pontus from 38 to 64

== Other ==
- Polemon (snake), a genus of venomous snakes found in Africa
- Polemopolis, a Latin name of Sodankylä

== See also ==
- Palaemon (disambiguation)
