= Percival Chubb =

English founding member of The Fabian Society (1860–1959)

Percival Ashley Chubb (June 17, 1860 in Devonport, Plymouth–1959) was a founding member of the Fabian Society, an influential British socialist organization that aims to advance the principles of democratic socialism via gradualist and reformist effort in democracies.

Born in 1860, Chubb attended the Stationers' School in London. He entered the civil service in 1878, joining the legal department of the Local Government Board. In 1884, he helped found the Fabian Society, calling a series of meetings that led to the organization's founding. Two years later, he joined the Ethical Society.

In 1889, Chubb emigrated to the United States, where he took a series of teaching jobs: first, lecturer at Thomas Davidson's School of the Cultural Sciences in Farmington, Connecticut; then lecturer at the Brooklyn Academy of Arts and Sciences (1890-1892); Head of English, Brooklyn Manual Training High School (1893-1897); second-grade principal of New York Society's Ethical Culture School (1897); lecturer at the Pratt Institute and New York University, New York. From 1897 to 1910, he was the associate leader of the Society for Ethical Culture of New York.

He married his second wife, Anna Sheldon, the widow of Walter Sheldon, founder of the St. Louis Ethical Society, which Chubb would lead from 1911 to 1932.

Chubb was the president of the Drama League of America from 1915-1920. He retired in 1932, but served as president of the American Ethical Union from 1934 to 1939.

His publications and related work include editing John Dryden's Palamon and Arcite, a translation of The Knight's Tale of Chaucer (New York, 1908); On the religious frontier: from an outpost of ethical religion (Macmillan Co, New York, 1931); The teaching of English in the elementary and secondary school (Macmillan Co, new York, 1902); and Introduction to Select writings of Ralph Waldo Emerson (1888); editor of Essays of Montaigne (1893).

Chubb died in 1960.
