= The Two Noble Kinsmen =

Play partly written by William Shakespeare

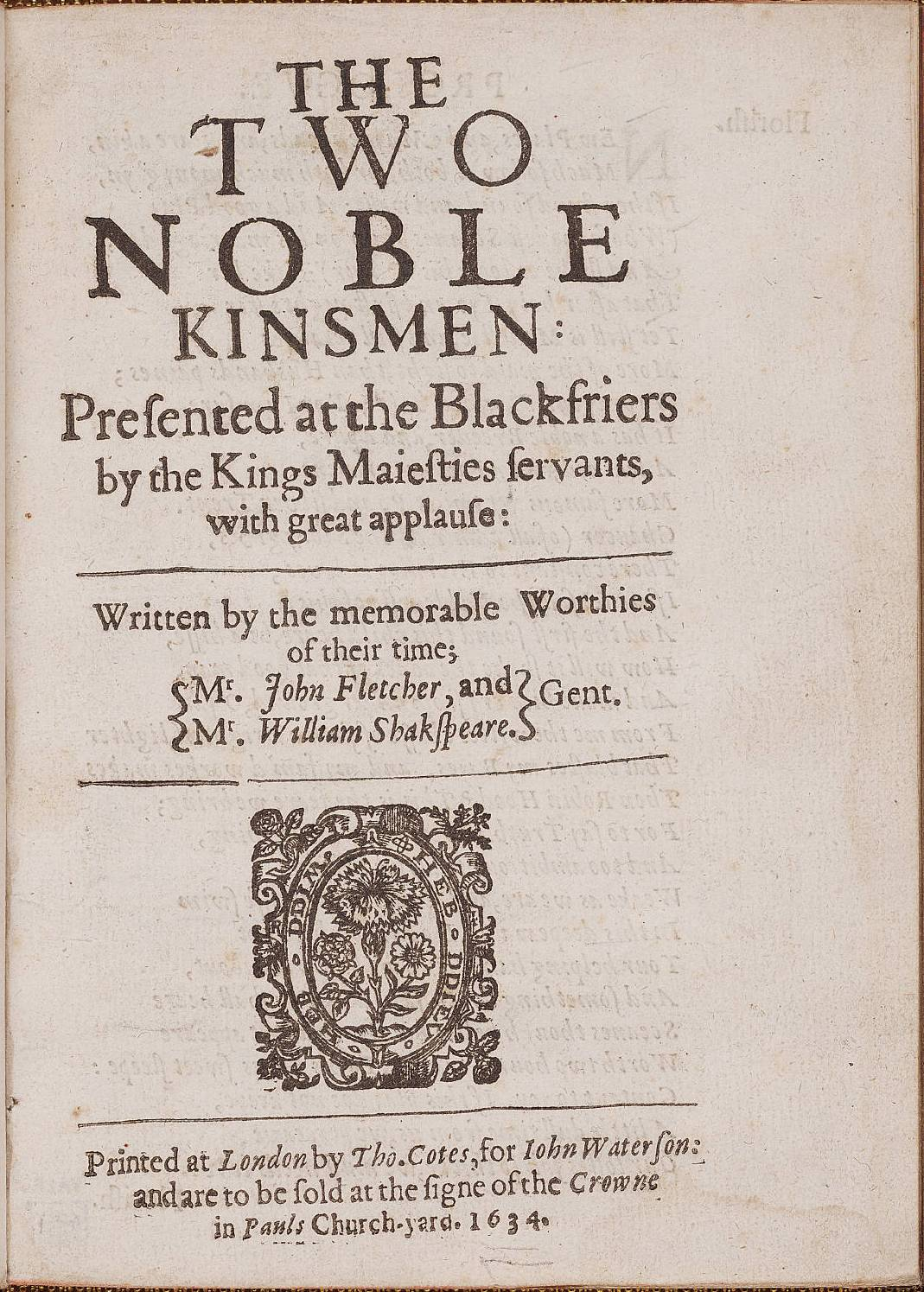
Title page of the 1634 quarto

The Two Noble Kinsmen is a Jacobean tragicomedy, first published in 1634 and attributed jointly to John Fletcher and William Shakespeare. Its plot derives from "The Knight's Tale" in Geoffrey Chaucer's The Canterbury Tales (1387–1400), which had already been dramatised at least twice before, and itself was a shortened version of Boccaccio's epic poem Teseida. This play is believed to have been originally performed in 1613–1614, making it William Shakespeare's final play before he retired to Stratford-upon-Avon, where he died in 1616.

Formerly a point of controversy, the dual attribution is now generally accepted by scholarly consensus.

== Characters ==
- Theseus, Duke of Athens
- Palamon, nephew of the King of Thebes
- Arcite, nephew of the King of Thebes
- Pirithous, an Athenian general
- Artesius, an Athenian captain
- Valerius, a noble of Thebes
- Six Knights
- A Herald
- A Jailer
- Wooer of the jailer's daughter
- A Doctor
- Brother of the jailer
- Friends of the jailer
- A Gentleman
- Gerrold, a schoolmaster
- Hippolyta, wife of Theseus
- Emilia, her sister
- Three Queens
- Jailer's Daughter
- Emilia's Servant
- Country Wenches and Women personating Hymen, Boy
- A Laborer
- Countrymen, Messengers
- A Man personating Hymen, Boy
- Executioners, Guards, Soldiers, Attendants

== Synopsis ==
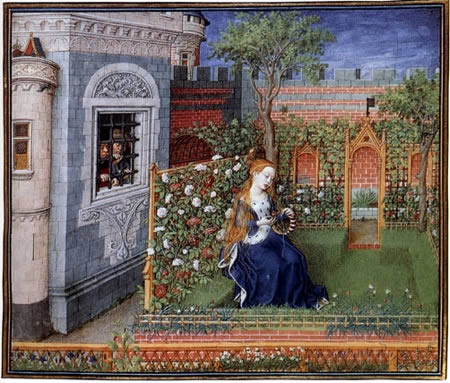
Emilia in the rose garden from Boccaccio's Teseida, French, c. 1460

A prologue informs the audience that the play is based on a story from Chaucer.

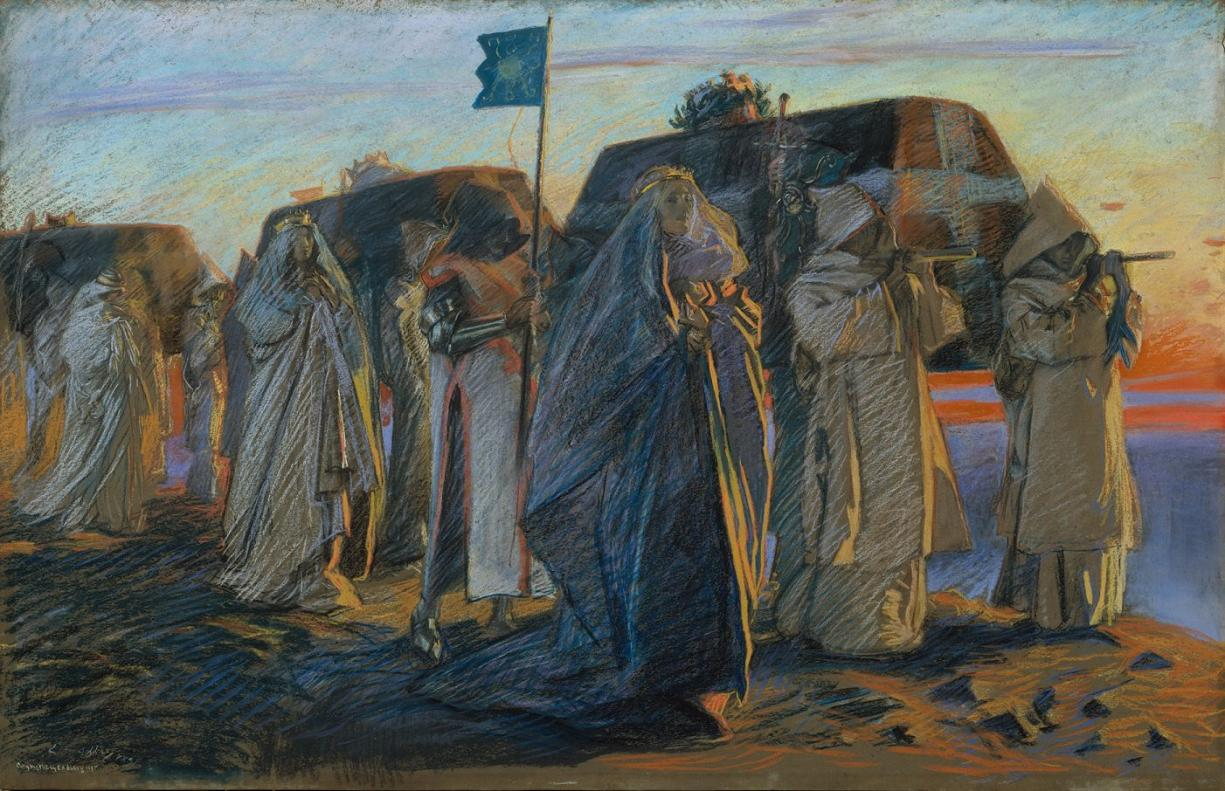
"Dirge of Three Queens" (act I, scene 5): the three queens bury their three husbands (Edwin Austin Abbey, c. 1895)

Three queens come to plead with Theseus and Hippolyta, rulers of Athens, to avenge the deaths of their husbands by the hand of the tyrant Creon of Thebes. Creon has killed the three kings and refuses to allow them proper burial. Theseus agrees to wage war on Creon.

In Thebes, cousins and close friends Palamon and Arcite are bound by duty to fight for Creon, though they are appalled by his tyranny. They fight courageously in battle, but the Thebans are defeated by Theseus. Palamon and Arcite are imprisoned but philosophically resign themselves to their fate. Their stoicism is instantly destroyed when from their prison window they see Princess Emilia, Hippolyta's sister. Both fall in love with her, and their friendship turns to bitter rivalry. Arcite is released after a relative intercedes on his behalf. He is banished from Athens, but he disguises himself, wins a local wrestling match, and is appointed as Emilia's bodyguard.

Meanwhile, the jailer's daughter has fallen in love with Palamon and helps him escape. She follows him, but he ignores her since he is still obsessed with Emilia. He lives in the forest half-starved, where he meets Arcite. The two argue, but Arcite offers to bring Palamon food, drink and armaments so that they can meet in an equal fight over Emilia.

The jailer's daughter, forsaken, has gone mad. She sings and babbles in the forest. She meets a troupe of local countrymen who want to perform a Morris dance before the king and queen. The local schoolmaster Gerald invites the mad daughter to join the performance. Theseus and Hippolyta appear hunting. Gerald hails them, and they agree to watch the yokels perform a bizarre act for them, with the jailer's mad daughter dancing. The royal couple reward them.

Arcite returns with the food and weapons. After a convivial dinner with reminiscences, the two fight. Theseus and his entourage arrive on the scene. He orders for Palamon and Arcite to be arrested and executed. Hippolyta and Emilia intervene and so Theseus agrees to a public tournament between the two for Emilia's hand. Each warrior will be allowed three companions to assist them. The loser and his companion knights will be executed.

The jailer finds his daughter with the help of friends. He tries to restore her mental health. On the advice of a doctor, he encourages her former suitor to pretend to be Palamon so that she will be gradually accustomed to see him as her true love. His devotion slowly wins her over.

Before the tournament, Arcite prays to Mars that he win the battle, Palamon prays to Venus that he marry Emilia and Emilia prays to Diana that she be wed to the one who loves her best. Each prayer is granted: Arcite wins the combat but is then thrown from his horse and dies, leaving Palamon to wed Emilia.

== Sources ==
Before the composition of The Two Noble Kinsmen, Chaucer's "Knight's Tale"—itself based on Giovanni Boccaccio's Teseida—had been adapted for the stage twice before, although both versions are now lost. The first was by Richard Edwardes in Palamon and Arcite (1566). This play was commissioned for a one-off performance before Queen Elizabeth in Oxford. It was never published, and it is unlikely to have served as a basis for The Two Noble Kinsmen.

Another play on the topic, the authorship of which is not known, would certainly have been known to Shakespeare and Fletcher. It was performed by the Admiral's Men in September 1594, which had then recently been formed after a split in Shakespeare's company. Philip Henslowe commissioned the play, which may have influenced Shakespeare's own A Midsummer Night's Dream, which is usually considered to have been written around this time.

The comic sub-plot involving the jailer's daughter has no direct source, but is similar to scenes in The Masque of the Inner Temple and Gray's Inn (1613), by Francis Beaumont, from which the performance by the yokels is derived. The Schoolmaster who organises it recalls Rombus in Sir Philip Sidney's one-act play The Lady of May (1579?). In other respects, he resembles Peter Quince in A Midsummer Night's Dream.

== Date and text ==
Links between The Two Noble Kinsmen and contemporaneous works point to 1613–1614 as its date of composition and first performance. A reference to Palamon, one of the protagonists of Kinsmen, is contained in Ben Jonson's play Bartholomew Fair (1614). In Jonson's work, a passage in Act IV, scene iii, appears to indicate that Kinsmen was known and familiar to audiences at that time.

In Beaumont's The Masque of the Inner Temple and Gray's Inn (1613), the second anti-masque features this cast of rural characters: pedant, May Lord and Lady, servingman and chambermaid, tavern host and hostess, shepherd and his wench, and two "bavians" (male and female baboon). The same cast slightly simplified (minus wench and one "bavian") enacts the Morris dance in Kinsmen, II, v, 120–138. A successful "special effect" in Beaumont's masque, designed for a single performance, appears to have been adopted and adapted into Kinsmen, indicating that the play followed soon after the masque.

The play was entered into the Stationers' Register on 8 April 1634; the quarto was published later that year by the bookseller John Waterson, printed by Thomas Cotes. The play was not included in the First Folio (1623) or any of the subsequent Folios of Shakespeare's works, though it was included in the second Beaumont and Fletcher folio of 1679.

In September 2020, media reported that early seventeenth-century editions of several English plays, including a 1634 Two Noble Kinsmen had been discovered by John Stone of the University of Barcelona at the Royal Scots College's library in Salamanca, Spain. The inclusion of The Two Noble Kinsmen in one of these two volumes makes it perhaps the oldest copy of any of Shakespeare's works in the country and the first to circulate in the Spanish-speaking world.

== Shakespeare and Fletcher contributions ==
Researchers have applied a range of tests and techniques to determine the relative shares of Shakespeare and Fletcher in the play. For example, Smith (1974) cites "metrical characteristics, vocabulary and word-compounding, incidence of certain contractions, kinds and uses of imagery, and characteristic lines of certain types", and offers a breakdown that agrees, in general if not in all details, with those of other scholars:

Shakespeare
Act I, scenes 1–3; Act II, scene 1; Act III, scene 1; Act V, scene 1, lines 34–173, and scenes 3 and 4.
Fletcher
Prologue; Act II, scenes 2–6; Act III, scenes 2–6; Act IV, scenes 1 and 3; Act V, scene 1, lines 1–33, and scene 2; Epilogue.
Uncertain
Act I, scenes 4 and 5; Act IV, scene 2.

== Performance history ==
In addition to whatever public performances there were around 1613–1614, evidence suggests a performance of The Two Noble Kinsmen at Court in 1619. In 1664, after theatres had re-opened after Charles II returned to the throne at the beginning of the English Restoration period, Sir William Davenant produced an adaptation of The Two Noble Kinsmen for the Duke's Company titled The Rivals. Thomas Betterton played the role of Philander, Davenant's version of Palamon. Samuel Pepys saw Davenant's production, and judged it "no excellent play, but good acting in it" (10 September 1664).

=== Modern revivals ===
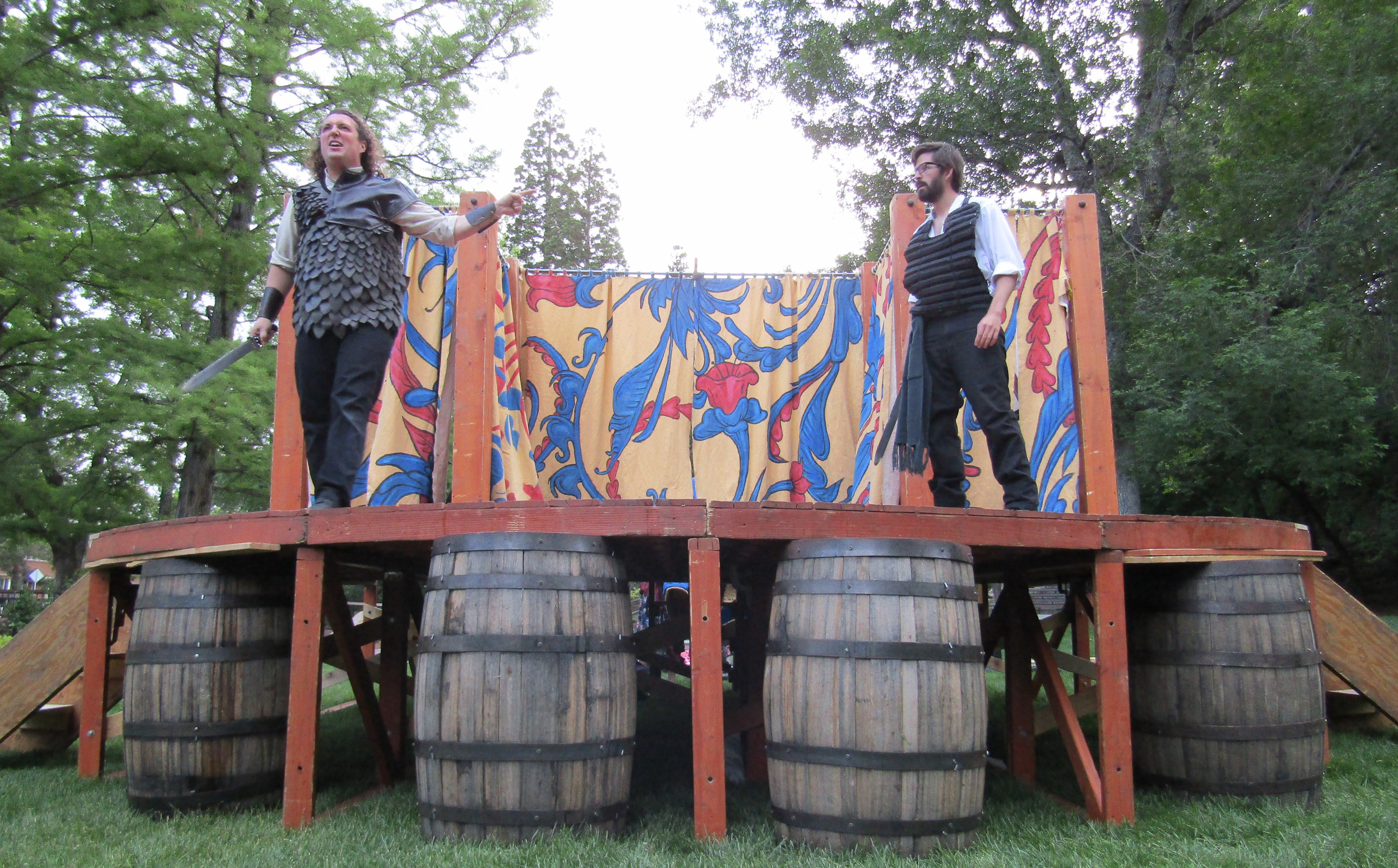
Modern production by the Grassroots Shakespeare Company of Utah

A production was staged by the Royal Shakespeare Company at the Swan Theatre's inaugural season in 1986. In 2016, the Royal Shakespeare Company staged a version of the play at the Swan Theatre, and the play was part of the 2018 summer season at Shakespeare's Globe Theatre in London.

In July 2007, the Hudson Shakespeare Company of New Jersey staged a version of the play as part of its annual Shakespeare in the Parks series. Director David Sewell set the production in ancient Greece with an ethnically diverse cast reflective of its Mediterranean setting.

A production opened on 9 June 2015 at the White Bear Theatre in Vauxhall, London—the first London production of the play since 2000.

In 2019, The Porters of Hellsgate in Los Angeles staged a production in a rep with Double Falsehood. The production, directed by Will Block, re-purposed the Morris Dance as a hallucination featuring major characters from the Jailer's Daughter's life. It also excised Palamon and Arcite's prayers, focusing the scene instead on Emilia's dilemma.

From January 25 to February 4, 2024, the Toronto based Shakespeare Bash'd Theatre Company staged this play in Toronto at The Theatre Centre Incubator (1115 Queen St West).
