= Trinity Tales =

1975 British TV drama series

- Credit sequence segueing from medieval illustration to pub beer-mat
- Genre: Comedy drama
- Written by: Alan Plater
- Directed by: Tristan de Vere Cole; Roger Tucker
- Starring: Bill Maynard; Francis Matthews; John Stratton; Colin Farrell; Gaye Brown
- Composers: Alex Glasgow; Michael Maxwell Steer
- Country of origin: United Kingdom
- Original language: English
- No. of series: 1
- No. of episodes: 6

Production
- Producer: David Rose
- Running time: 50 minutes

Original release
- Network: BBC Two
- Release: 21 November – 26 December 1975

Trinity Tales is a 1975 British television series, consisting of six 50-minute programmes, written by Alan Plater and shown on BBC2. It was loosely based on Geoffrey Chaucer's Canterbury Tales, updated to a modern setting.

The series evolved from a stage play by Plater, "Trinity Tales or The Road to Wembley", which was performed by the Birmingham Repertory Theatre Company from 30 January 1975 to 22 February 1975.

== Scenario ==
A bus carrying supporters of rugby league club Wakefield Trinity is on its way from Wakefield to a Challenge Cup Final at London's Wembley Stadium. To pass the time each of the characters on the bus tells a story. The teller of the best tale will win a free fish-and-chip supper provided by "Stan the Fryer", a chip shop proprietor. Along with Stan, the travellers are Nick, the bus driver, "Smith, the Man of Law" (a policeman), "Alice, the wife of Batley", "Dave the Joiner", his girlfriend "Judy the Judy" and a writer referred to as "Eric the prologue". On the way they stop off at several pubs. At one stop-off point they pick up the pub's lugubrious landlord, Reuben.

== Commentary ==
Names such as "Stan the Fryer" and the "Wife of Batley" are parodies of the names of the Chaucerian characters, the Wife of Bath and the Huberd the Friar. The figure of Chaucer himself is replaced by the writer Eric.

Plater adapted five of the original stories: the Miller's Tale, the Wife of Bath's tale, the Reeve's Tale, the Knight's Tale and the Franklin's Tale. Another story begun by Eric is cut off by the other pilgrims for being boring, just like Chaucer's tale of Sir Thopas in the original.

The tales are told in ways that parody TV and film clichés of the era. Thus The Man of Law's Tale, is a pastiche of 1973 film, The Sting, and Eric's unfinished tale is told in the style of an arty film noir. The actors playing the "pilgrims" also perform the roles of the characters in the various tales, usually reflecting the personality of their pilgrim.

The tales typically involve techniques such as breaking the narrative with songs, and comic Brechtian alienation devices, including characters commenting on their own roles in the story.

== Episodes ==
The tales were first broadcast from 21 November to 26 December 1975 on BBC2. The series was repeated in 1977.

- The Driver's Tale - 21 November 1975: Con-man "Big George" attempts to swindle rugby fans by selling tickets for a non-existent trip to Wembley.
- The Fryer's Tale - 28 November 1975: Arthur, a weedy youth, is in love with Dorothy, the wife of rich man. He has to play rugby for Britain to win her interest. (based on The Franklin's Tale)
- The Judy's Tale - 5 December 1975: Sam and Charlie compete for the favours of a barmaid, Judy. She tells them to perform a series of tasks in the pub to prove their worth, which ends up with both passed-out drunk. (based on The Knight's Tale)
- The Joiner's Tale - 12 December 1975: Eric attempts to tell a Chandleresque film noir story but is cut off. Dave butts in with a different tale. Two workmen outwit an obnoxious businessman while building a cocktail bar at his house, continually managing to extend the job. In the end they complete the work by "testing" the bar with the help of the man's wife and daughter, ending up in bed with them. (based on The Reeve's Tale)
- The Wife of Batley's Tale - 19 December 1975: A would-be trendy DJ for "wonderful radio Batley" is sacked by his boss but is helped by a mysterious woman. (based on The Wife of Bath's Tale)
- The Man of Law's Tale - 26 December 1975: A financial scam goes wrong.

== Cast ==
- Bill Maynard (Stan the fryer)
- Francis Matthews (Eric the prologue)
- Colin Farrell (Nick the driver)
- Gaye Brown (Alice, the Wife of Batley)
- John Stratton (Smith, the Man of Law)
- Susan Littler (Judy the Judy)
- Paul Copley (Dave the joiner)
- Peter Benson (Reuben)

== Music ==
Audio Cues
