= Palaemon =

Palaemon, Palaimon, Palemon (Ancient Greek: Παλαίμων) may refer to:

- Palaemon (mythology), several mythological persons
- Remmius Palaemon, the ancient Roman grammarian
- Teacher of Saint Pachomius
- Palaemon (crustacean), a genus of shrimps
- Palemon Howard Dorsett (1862–1943) was an American horticulturalist
- Palemonids, legendary dynasty of the Grand Duchy of Lithuania
- Palémon, character from French comedy Le jugement de Midas

== See also ==
- Palmon
- Polemon (disambiguation)
- Palamon (disambiguation)
