= Jeanne de la Font =

French Renaissance poet (1500–1532)

- Born: 1500; Bourges, France
- Died: 1532 (aged 31–32)
- Occupations: Poet; patron of the arts
- Known for: French adaptation of Boccaccio's Teseida
- Spouse: Jacques Thiboust
- Children: 5 (including Jacqueline, Jeanne, and Marie)
- Parents: Jean de la Font; Françoise Godard

Jeanne de la Font (1500–1532) was a poet and patron of the French Renaissance.

== Life and work ==
Jeanne was the only child of Jean de la Font and Françoise Godard of Bourges. Marguerite de Navarre arranged her marriage to her secretary Jacques Thiboust. They lived in the city of Bourges, which had become a cultural centre because of the patronage of Jeanne of France at the start of the century. Marguerite attracted many humanists to the city and both Jeanne de la Font and her husband established friendly ties to them. The couple had five children, of whom Jacqueline, Jeanne and Marie Thiboust survived to adulthood and became known for their learning.

Jeanne wrote a French adaption of Giovanni Boccaccio's Teseida, which gained her praise as a poet.
