= Teseida =

Epic poem written by Giovanni Boccaccio

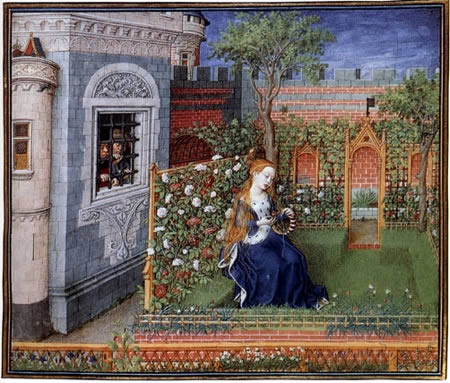
Emilia in the rose garden, French, c. 1460

Teseida (full title: Teseida delle Nozze d’Emilia, or The Theseid, Concerning the Nuptials of Emily) is a long epic poem written by Giovanni Boccaccio c.1340–41. Running to almost 10,000 lines divided into twelve books, its notional subject is the career and rule of the ancient Greek hero Theseus (Teseo), although the majority of the epic tells the story of the rivalry of Palemone and Arcita for the love of Emilia. It is the main source of "The Knight's Tale" in Geoffrey Chaucer's Canterbury Tales, and therefore is the original source of The Two Noble Kinsmen, a collaboration by William Shakespeare and John Fletcher. The exact sources of Boccaccio's knowledge about the ancient Greek world are unknown, but is likely that he gained the knowledge through his close friendship with Paolo de Perugia, a medieval collector of ancient myths and tales.

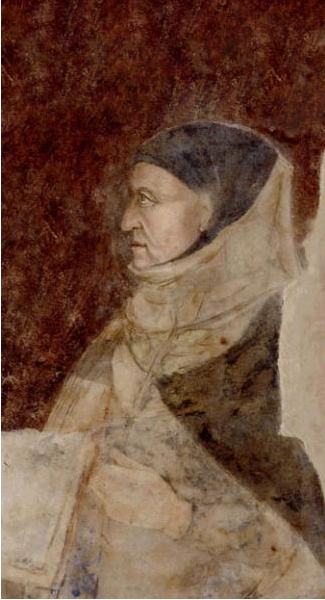
Teseida

French poets Jeanne de la Font and Anne de Graville gained fame in the sixteenth century by writing French verse adaptions of Teseida.

== Synopsis ==
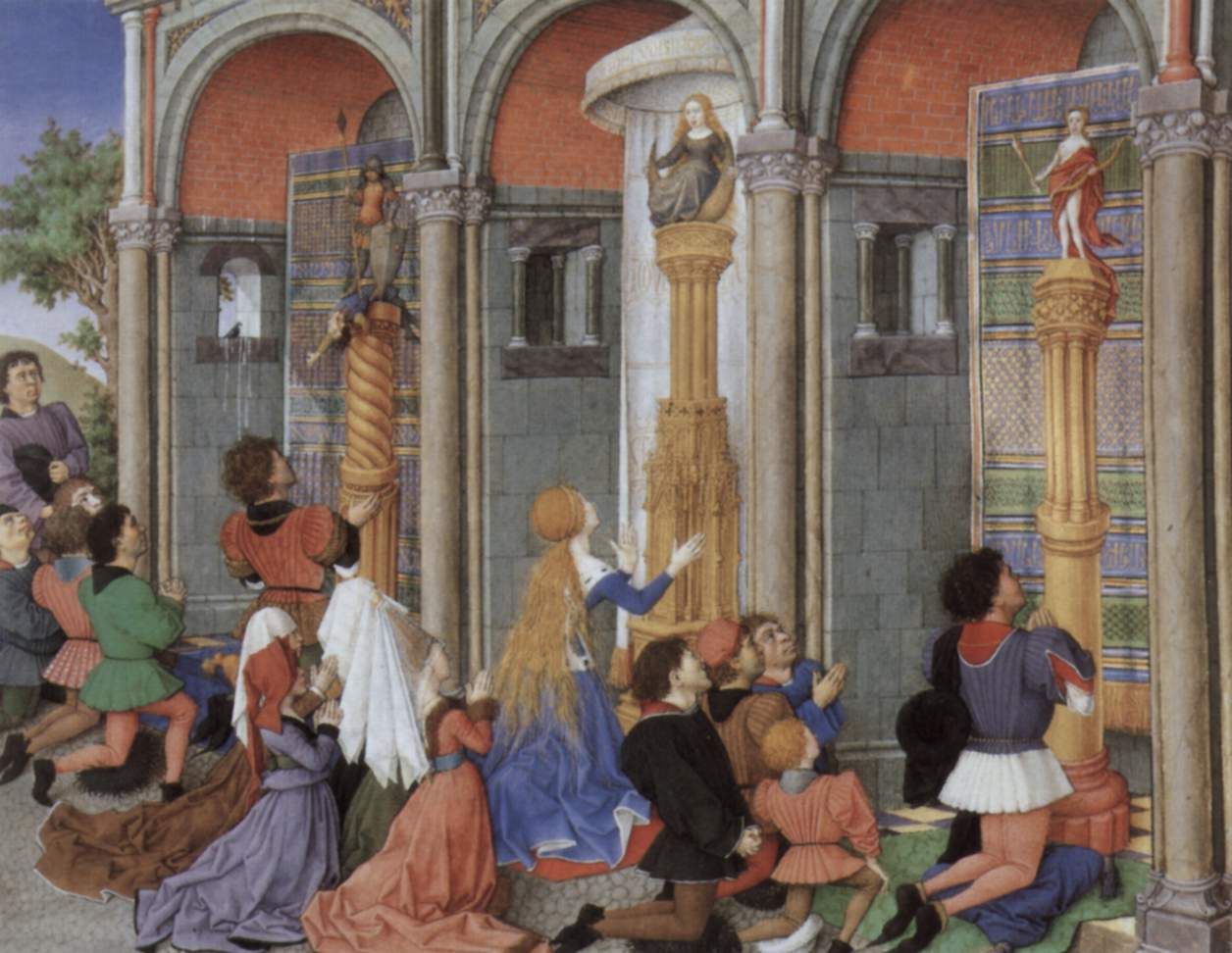
Arcita, Emilia, and Palamone pray to their respective deities, Mars, Diana, and Venus.

Book I: The women of Scythia rebel against the men and elect Ipolita (Hippolyta) as their queen. Teseo (Theseus) decides to purge this sin and launches an expedition into Scythia, the land of the Amazons. He attacks the fortress of Ipolita and sends her a message asking her either to surrender or to be ready to die. There his expedition is victorious against the warrior women. She finally surrenders with a pact whereby she becomes his queen. Teseo is also attracted by the beauty of her sister Emilia.

Book II: Returning home to Athens with Ipolita, he encounters on the road a group of women from Thebes. They are the widows of nobles and heroes defeated by the new ruler there, Creon, who has refused to let the bodies of the vanquished be buried. At their entreaty, Teseo reroutes his army to Thebes (sending Ipolita on to Athens under guard) and there does battle against Creon. Teseo is victorious again. In the aftermath, Teseo's soldiers find two cousins nearly dead on the battlefield. They are Palemone and Arcita, who belong to the Theban royal family. So Teseo orders them taken with him to Athens to be imprisoned for life.

Book III: From out of the window of their shared prison cell, both men spy Ipolita's younger sister, Emilia, and are instantly smitten. But neither has any hope of pursuing the object of his ardor. However, at the intercession of Peritoo, a friend of Teseo, Arcita is released from prison under the condition that he will leave Athens and never return.

Book IV: Both men are now beside themselves with love agony: Palemone because he remains in prison where he can see Emilia but can't reach her; Arcita because he can't even see Emilia, forced as he is to stay out of Athens on pain of death. But after years pass and he has become gaunt from his love agonies, Arcita looks very different from his previous appearance. So he decides to risk all by returning to Athens under that disguise, adopting the name Penteo. There he manages to secure a position in Teseo's court and gradually gains prominence.

Book V: Still in prison, Palemone eventually learns of Arcita's return and becomes wildly jealous. This leads him to make a daring escape and then confront Arcita in a grove where Arcita frequently goes to sigh out this love. The two commence a duel to the death but are soon interrupted by Teseo who happens to be leading a hunting party through that very grove. Learning who the combatants are and the cause of their dispute, he decrees that the two must fight it out formally in the lists, the victor to win the hand of Emilia. He gives the two a year to scour the world and gather a hundred of the noblest knights each.

Book VI: A year later the opposing champions arrive and are described in detail, as is the arena specially built for the contest.

Book VII: Just before the morning of battle, the opposing lovers, as well as Emilia (who wants to remain single), pray to their respective deities. And each receives a positive sign that seems to contradict the signs received by the others. The battle is then prepared for.

Book VIII: The two opposing armies engage in a battle that is described in detail. But it soon comes down to a contest between the two lovers. Finally, Arcita gains the victory, doing so without killing Palemone.

Book IX: Arcita is accidentally injured. But he is still able to celebrate his victory and marry Emilia.

Book X: Then Arcita, after much suffering, dies from his wounds.

Book XI: He is given a hero's funeral that is described in elaborate detail.

Book XII: In the end, Teseo determines that Emilia and Palemone should marry, and this is done. Thus all the seemingly contradictory prophesies of the gods (given in Book VII) are fulfilled.
