= Galliot du Pré =

Parisian bookseller and publisher

- Occupations: Bookseller; publisher

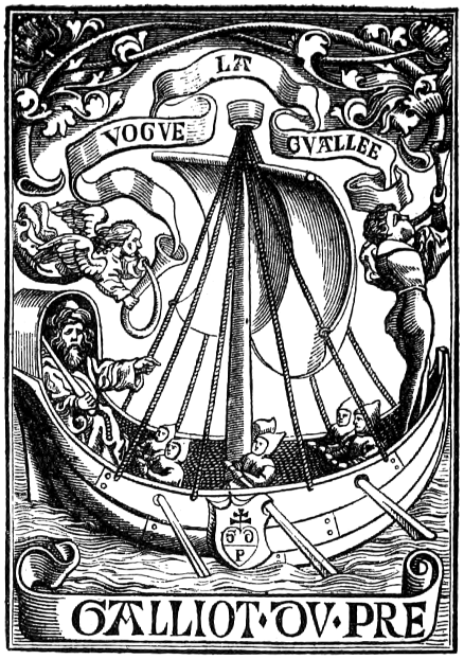
Imprint used from 1512

Galliot du Pré (died April 1560) was a Parisian bookseller and publisher.

In May 1514 the Royal Chancery of Louis XII granted du Pré the privilege of exclusive rights. This was confirmed in 1515 by Francis I.

Galliot du Pré's imprint device featured a ship with an angel blowing a trumpet, which issues the words "Vogue la Guallee" (or sometimes "la galee"). The ship is a galiot, likely serving as a visual pun based on du Pré's first name.

== Publications ==
- Le Grand Coustumier de France (1514)
- L'Instruction et manière de procéder ès cours du Parlement (1514)
- Les Grandes Chroniques de Bretaigne by Alain Bouchart (1514 bis 1531)
- les Mémoires by Philippe de Commynes (1524)
- les Annales et chroniques de France by Nicole Gilles (1525)
- les Œuvres by Alain Chartier (1529)
- Les dictz moraux des philosophes by Guillaume de Tignonville (1531)
- Libri de re rustica by Cato the Elder, Varro and Columella et Palladius (1533);
- Biblia sacra (1541, Folio);
- Les Divines institutions de Lactance Firmian traduites by René Fumé (1542, Folio);
- Tractatus juris regaliorum (1542, Folio);
- Tractatus duo de origine et usu jurisdictionum by Pierre Bertrand (1551).
