= Myra Orth =

American art historian

- Born: Myra Whitney Dickman; 6 October 1934
- Died: 30 November 2002 (aged 68)
- Education: Cornell University; New York University Institute of Fine Arts
- Occupations: Art historian University teacher Writer
- Known for: her specialism in French Renaissance manuscripts
- Spouse: William "Bill" Torrence Orth
- Children: 2

Myra Orth (born Myra Dickman: 4 October 1934 - 30 November 2002) was an American art historian. After graduating from Cornell University she married and relocated with her husband to Europe where for much of the time she lived - apart from three years in Australia and Japan - between 1956 and 1982, while remaining fully networked with academic peers in the United States. Her post-graduate degrees were acquired in part "by correspondence"; while the renaissance manuscript illuminations, on which she became a leading international authority, were located for the most part in western Europe, and particularly in Paris where she worked frequently and lived between 1976 and 1982. Her published contributions to scholarship appeared primarily in the United States, France and England.

== Life and works ==
Myra Whitney Dickman was born in the United States of America. Her father was a member of New York's Grolier Club with a passionate appreciation of "print culture" which he shared with his daughter. Her mother is described as a social worker and "strong feminist". Myra Dickman graduated from Cornell University in 1956 and on 18 August 1956 married William "Bill" Orth at Riverside CT. Her MA (1964) and PhD (1976) were both supervised by Colin Eisler at the Institute of Fine Arts, New York University. The MA dissertation was titled "Progressive Tendencies in French Manuscript Illuminations (1515-1530)," and the doctoral work concerned "Godefroy le Batave and the 1520s Hours Workshop".

In 1956 the Orths moved to Europe, where they lived briefly in France and then Germany before returning to Brooklyn where Myra enrolled at New York University and embarked on her postgraduate studies. After she received her MA in 1964, the couple lived successively in Belgium (1965-1969), Australia (1970–72) Japan (1972) and England (1972-75) before settling more permanently in Paris in 1976. While his wife pursued her academic career, by 1977 Bill Orth was reported to be working as a Southern Europe regional sales manager for GM-Opel. The couple's two children were born in 1963 and 1965.

The Getty Research Institute in Los Angeles contains an archive of "Myra Dickman Orth research papers", stored in 83 boxes, (Note: Accession no. 2004.M.10.) including lecture notes, teaching and course notebooks, and notes for her MA and PhD degree dissertations. 65 of the 83 boxes are given over to her "Publications and research (1970-2003)", including not just the typescripts for articles published and lectures delivered, but also research notes and tools. She returned in her research on several occasions to the (originally Flemish) Paris illuminator Godefroy le Batave, who had formed the focus of her doctoral dissertation. There was an important work on sixteenth century Books of hours and the illustrations in manuscripts from the court of Henry II. However, her most formidable published work, and probably the one of greatest value to non-specialist readers, is the posthumously published twin volume study titled "Renaissance manuscripts: the sixteenth century". The first volume was completed by the time of the author's death, and was published in 2005. The second volume appeared only in 2015, by which time much new research had become available, and while the main text was little changed when it appeared in 2015, it did incorporate a greatly extended bibliography and suitable updates in respect of the current locations of manuscripts referenced. In the words of a brief review-synopsis from Larissa Grollemond of the J. Paul Getty Museum, the 720 page study "is the first to provide a comprehensive guide to Renaissance illumination, so often relegated to a secondary place behind its medieval forebears, and to establish book illumination as a central medium in France during the sixteenth century".

In 1976, as her children entered their teenage years, Myra Orth accepted a teaching position at the (subsequently renamed) "American College" in Paris. Although she was recruited to teach "Renaissance Art History", she quickly widened the scope of her courses to embrace art more generally and architecture in France and England up to and including the eighteenth century. She also served as "Department Chair" and "Head of the Humanities Division" from 1980 till 1982.

Myra Orth returned to the United States in 1982 and took a teaching position at the University of Virginia, where she taught Renaissance art history for a year, later moving across to California. Between 1985 and 1992 she was employed as "Special Collections Curator" and Section Head of Northern Paintings for the Photo Archive" at the "Getty Center for the History of Art and the Humanities" (as the "Getty Research Institute" was known at that time). Context for the appointment is provided by the Getty Center's extensive document photographing project, and for two years during her time with the organisation Orth found herself serving as "Acting Head of the Photo Archive" She took the lead in a major exercise to photograph and place on microfilm manuscripts held at the Library of the Russian Academy of Sciences and Humanities in Saint Petersburg and on Prague's National Museum and Museum of Decorative Arts, a project undertaken jointly with the Paris-based Institut de recherche et d'histoire des textes. Another highlight of her career with the Getty Center involved curating an exhibition on the newly acquired (and remarkably extensive) archive of the English art historian Ellis Waterhouse. Myra Orth retired from the payroll of the Getty Center in 1995, but continued to undertake work for the center as an advisor.

After retiring, Myra Orth relocated to Boston, which enabled her to live relatively close to her daughter. The proximity of Harvard Library and Logan Airport made it possible to focus on research and writing, without the distractions of salaried employment.

Myra Orth was 68 when she died of brain cancer on 30 November 2002.
