= Polemon (son of Theramenes) =

Macedonian officer

Polemon (Ancient Greek: Πολέμων; lived 4th century BC), son of Theramenes, was a Macedonian officer. He was left by Alexander in the command of a fleet of thirty triremes which was destined to guard the mouths of the Nile and the sea-coast of Egypt in 331 BC.
