= The Knight's Tale =

Part of the Canterbury Tales

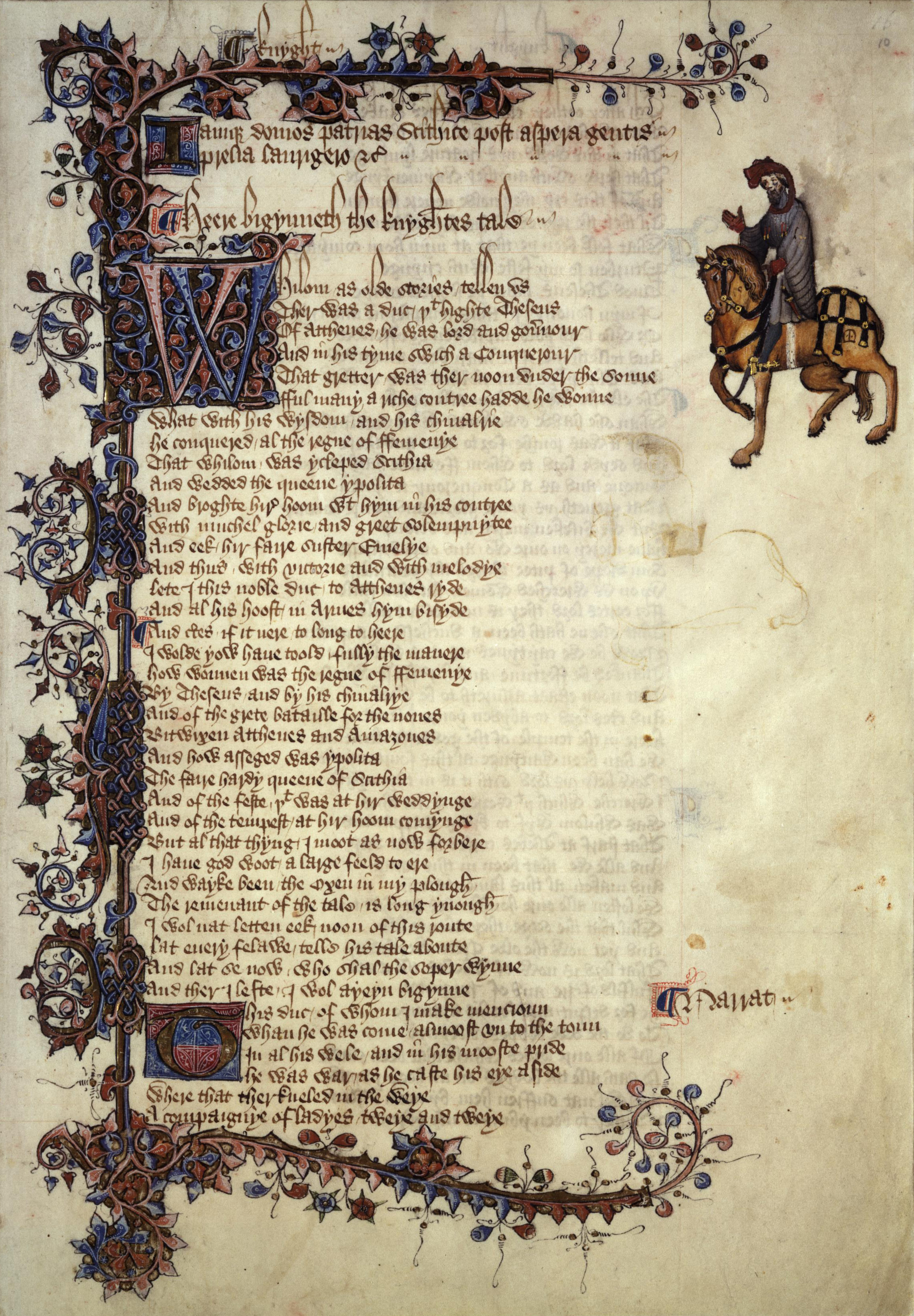
The first page of Knight's Tale in the Ellesmere manuscript

"The Knight's Tale" (Middle English: The Knightes Tale) is the first tale from Geoffrey Chaucer's The Canterbury Tales.

The Knight is described by Chaucer in the "General Prologue" as the person of highest social standing amongst the pilgrims, though his manners and clothes are unpretentious. We are told that he has taken part in some fifteen crusades in many countries and also fought for one pagan leader against another. Though the list of campaigns is real, his characterization is idealized. Most readers have taken Chaucer's description of him as "a verray, parfit gentil knyght" to be sincere but Terry Jones suggested that this description was ironic, and that Chaucer's readers would have deduced that the Knight was a mercenary. He is accompanied on his pilgrimage by the Squire, his 20-year-old son.

The story introduces themes and arguments typically encountered in the literature of knighthood, including courtly love and ethical dilemmas.

== Sources and composition ==
The epic poem Teseida (full title Teseida delle Nozze d’Emilia, or "The Theseid, Concerning the Nuptials of Emily") by Giovanni Boccaccio is the source of the tale, although Chaucer makes many significant diversions from that poem. The Teseida has 9,896 lines in twelve books, while "The Knight's Tale" has only 2,250 lines—though it is still one of the longest poems in the Tales. Most of the epic characteristics of the Teseida are removed, and instead the poem conforms primarily to the genre of romance; there are no epic invocations; the fighting and mythological references are severely reduced; and Theseus's conquests, the assault on Thebes, and the epic catalogue of heroes fighting for Palamon and Arcite are all severely compressed. The Knight-narrator repeatedly admits that he must skip past such details so that other pilgrims will get a chance to tell their stories.

The tale is considered a chivalric romance, yet it is markedly different from either the English or French traditions of such tales. For instance, there is the inclusion of philosophical themes—mainly of the kind contained in the Consolation of Philosophy of Boethius—astrological references, and an epic context.

The tale is the first to be told in The Canterbury Tales, as it is announced as such in the "Prologue." The tale that follows it is told by the drunken Miller and also involves a conflict between two men over a woman. It is a direct antithesis to the Knight's in register, with none of the nobility or heritage of classical mythology, but is instead a rollicking, bawdy fabliau, and designed to annoy the Knight and amuse the other pilgrims with its crude comedy.

== Synopsis ==
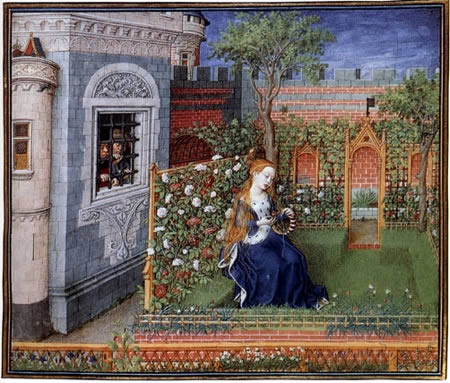
Emilia in the rose garden from Boccaccio's Teseida, French, c. 1460

Two cousins and knights, Palamon and Arcite, are captured and imprisoned by Theseus, duke of Athens, after being found unconscious following his battle against Creon. Their cell sits in the tower of Theseus's castle, with a window which overlooks his palace garden. The imprisoned Palamon wakes early one morning in May and catches sight of Emelye, who is Theseus's sister-in-law, below in the courtyard picking flowers for a garland. He instantly falls in love with her, wondering if she is human or a goddess; his moan is heard by Arcite, who then also wakes and sees Emelye. He falls in love with her as well. This angers Palamon, who believes that he claimed her first. Arcite argues that he also loved Emelye before it was even established that she was human, and adds that love obeys no rules anyway.

The friendship between Palamon and Arcite quickly deteriorates over their competition for Emelye. After some years, Arcite is released from prison through the help and advice of Perotheus, a mutual friend of Theseus and Arcite, commuting Arcite's sentence from imprisonment to exile; but Arcite laments that being away from Emelye is worse than imprisonment. He later secretly returns to Athens in disguise and enters service in Emelye's household, to get close to her. Palamon eventually escapes by drugging the jailer, and, while hiding in a grove, overhears Arcite singing about love and fortune.

They begin to duel with each other over who should get Emelye, but are thwarted by the arrival of Theseus's hunting party. Theseus plans to sentence the two to summary execution, but upon the protests of his wife and Emelye, he decides to have them compete in a tournament instead. Palamon and Arcite are to gather 100 men apiece and to fight a mass judicial tournament, the winner of which is to marry Emelye. The forces are assembled one year later and lavishly banqueted by Theseus. On the early morning before the tournament, Palamon prays to Venus to make Emelye his wife; Emelye prays to Diana to remain unmarried, or else to marry the one who truly loves her; and Arcite prays to Mars for victory. Theseus lays down rules for the tournament so that if any man becomes seriously injured, he must be dragged out of the battle and withdrawn from the combat. Because of this, the narrator (the Knight) claims that there were no deaths on either side.

Although both Palamon and Arcite fight valiantly, Palamon is wounded by a chance sword thrust from one of Arcite's men, and is unhorsed. Theseus declares the fight over. Arcite has won the battle; but Saturn intervenes on Venus's side, and Arcite's horse throws him off and falls on him, leaving him mortally wounded, before he can claim Emelye as his prize. As he dies in bed, he tells Emelye that she should marry Palamon, because he would make a good husband for her. After a heroic burial and a period of mourning, Theseus proclaims that Palamon should marry Emelye, and thus all three prayers are fulfilled.

== The First Mover ==
The First Mover or the Firste Moevere is a speech delivered by Theseus, spanning lines 2129–2216, bringing the poem's narrative to its close.

=== Background ===
The First Mover speech appears near the end of the poem, after the protagonists Arcite and Palamon have finished their duel for Emelye's hand; Arcite is fatally injured, and Theseus speaks to console Emelye and Palamon as they grieve for Arcite.

=== Summary ===
Theseus begins with a reference to the First Mover, the primum movens, or unmoved mover of Aristotelian philosophy creating the “Great Chain of Love”, the kyndely enclyning, or natural inclination, that holds the universe together in medieval cosmology. He describes the inevitability of death for all things at their proper time, using the destruction of an oak tree, a stone, and a river as examples, and listing all the classes of medieval society as universally subject to death. He then shifts to a discussion of the proper way to respond to this inevitability of death. Theseus maintains that, since every man must die when his time comes, that it is best to die with a good name and reputation, on good terms with his friends, and having died with honour. Theseus's comfort to Emelye and Palamon is that Arcite died in just such a manner, having acquitted himself well in a feat of arms.

=== Scholarly interpretation ===
It is generally acknowledged among scholars that the First Mover speech draws on the philosophy of Boethius. What the purpose of the speech is, however, has been assessed variously. Some scholars maintain that the speech, with its Boethian elements, is not only representative of Boethian philosophy, but of Chaucer's own beliefs, and a reconciliation of Boethian and Christian philosophy, though this is disputed. The speech has also been read as a parody of Boethius's Consolation of Philosophy, as a narrative device simply conveying an idea from the character of Theseus to the characters of Palamon and Emelye, as a transition from a tragic character death to a happy ending, as a counsel of how and when to die properly, and even as an expression of disappointment in not only the events of the tournament, but in the divine order he describes.

== Adaptations and derivations ==
Richard Edwardes's 1566 play Palamon and Arcite is based on this tale, but the text of the play is lost. Another version of the story was performed in 1594, but this is only known from a reference in Philip Henslowe's diary. The Two Noble Kinsmen, a 1613 play co-written by William Shakespeare and John Fletcher, is based on the tale.

John Dryden translated this story into the language of his time—modern English. Dryden's book is titled Palamon and Arcite and is longer than the original text due to the insertion of embellishments by the later poet.

In Alan Plater's 1975 TV series Trinity Tales the story is transformed into a competition between two young men for the attentions of a barmaid.

The story is one of the tales that inspired the 2001 movie A Knight's Tale, in which Chaucer himself is one of the principal characters, alongside Heath Ledger as William Thatcher, a peasant squire who poses as a knight and competes in tournaments, winning accolades and acquiring friendships with such historical figures as Edward the Black Prince (James Purefoy).

It was also adapted for the BBC's The Canterbury Tales in 2003. The names of the characters Palamon and Arcite are changed to Paul (Chiwetel Ejiofor) and Ace (John Simm), and the story was moved to a modern prison setting where the two men battle for the attentions of a prison teacher named Emily (Keeley Hawes).
