= Palamon and Arcite (Edwardes) =

Lost 16th-century play

- Written by: Richard Edwardes
- Original language: English
- Subject: Two warriors fall out over a beautiful princess
- Genre: Romance
- Setting: Ancient Greece

Premiere
- Date premiered: 1566
- Place premiered: Christ Church, Oxford

Palamon and Arcite (1566) is a play by Richard Edwardes, which was performed before Elizabeth I at Oxford. It is based on Chaucer's The Knight's Tale. Though the text of the play is lost, there is a detailed record of its structure and plot.

The performance was a highly spectacular affair organised by staff and students of Oxford University. The event was vividly recalled and described by many contemporary witnesses.

== Context ==
The play was created for a visit of the queen to Christ Church, Oxford, part of Oxford University. Edwardes was the courtier whose job it was to organise the Royal entertainments. He is usually credited as its author, but one writer at the time said that it was translated "from the Latin into the English tongue by Master Edwards and some other alumni of the college." However, no Latin original is known, and the source (Chaucer) is English. No other source says this; the writer may be conflating the play with others performed at the same event, a comedy and a tragedy, both in Latin, written by Oxford scholars. The performance was spread over two days, 2 and 4 September 1566.

According to Edwardes's biographer Albert Cook, the play was carefully crafted to appeal to Elizabeth, by emphasising the virginal purity of the heroine Emilia. But it was created at a time when Elizabeth was still young, and it was expected that she would marry at some point, as Emilia does at the end. The final scene was applauded and the queen gave a reward in gold coins (angels) to the actors in the principal female roles, Emilia and Hippolyta. The latter was performed by John Rainolds, who later became a leading Puritan, and recalled his youthful cross-dressing role with embarrassment.

== Performance ==
The actors were students and scholars of the university. Their performance was interrupted several times. Near the end, a spectator tried to intervene to stop the actors who he thought were recklessly destroying valuable items in a fire, which was part of the performance. At another point one of the actors, John Dalaper, completely forgot his lines, and apologised clumsily to the queen, who called him a "knave". More seriously, an accident occurred resulting in three deaths. Due to the pressure from the crowd watching from surrounding buildings, a wall and a flight of stairs collapsed. In addition to the three deaths, five people were seriously injured as a result. Despite the tragic accident, the show continued.

Edwardes's "finessing" of the queen's virgin persona was a success. "The sequel shows that his finesse was a complete success, for the audience greeted the conclusion of the marriage-scene with a riot of applause ('incredibili spectatorum clamore et plausu'), and the Queen gave Emilia a reward of eight angels." The queen especially admired the performance of a scene in which the character was "gatheringe her flowers prettily in ye garden and singing sweetlie in ye pryme of March."

=== Costume note ===
A record book of the wardrobe of Elizabeth I notes that part of a purple velvet gown that had belonged to Mary I of England was lost at Oxford "in a play before her majestie". This may refer to Palamon and Arcite or another entertainment during the same visit.

== Plot ==
Though the text was never published the plot was described in a Latin text by John Bereblock, a Fellow of Exeter College and artist, who recorded all the entertainments provided for the queen's visit. There are also records of conversations about the play, and comments by the queen on particular scenes. Albert S. Cook summarises Bereblock's account as follows:

Part I

- Palamon and Arcite, in prison, see Emilia, and quarrel over their love for her.
- Escape of Arcite.

(Considerable time-interval here in Chaucer.)

- Return of Arcite, who lives disguised as a servant in Emilia's household.
- Escape of Palamon, who meets Arcite in the woods, and quarrels with him.
- Intervention of Theseus, who ordains a tournament in forty days' time.

Part 2

- Arrival of the two knights, with their friends and retainers.
- The prayers of Palamon, Arcite, and Emilia.
- The single combat won by Arcite.
- The contention of the gods.
- Saturn strikes Arcite with subterranean fire, as he goes in triumphal procession.
- Funeral of Arcite, and marriage of Emilia to Palamon.
