= Palamon and Arcite =

1700 story by Joh Dryden

Palamon and Arcite is part of Fables, Ancient and Modern written by John Dryden and published in 1700. Palamon and Arcite is a translation of The Knight's Tale from The Canterbury Tales by Geoffrey Chaucer. Although the plot line is identical, Dryden expanded the original text with poetic embellishments. The source of Chaucer's tale was Boccaccio's Teseida. Translations include those by Percival Ashley Chubb (1899) and Walter William Skeat (1904).

== Characters ==
The four central characters remain the same as in Chaucer's story. Palamon, possible cousin of Arcite, is at least "brother-in-arms" according to Dryden. Arcite is a knight of royal blood, although this is not fully explained in the text. Emily (Emelye or Emilye) is the princess and stepdaughter or possibly niece of the king. And King Theseus is the Duke of Athens.

== Plot ==
Two knights named Palamon and Arcite are imprisoned by Theseus when he found them after a battle. They are held in a dungeon from which they can see into a courtyard. One day, Palamon, while looking through the bars of his cell, sees Emily. Falling in love instantly, Palamon cries out, causing Arcite to ask what's wrong. Palamon declares his newfound love for Emily, and as Arcite listens, he sees Emily. Turning to Palamon, Arcite claims that because he first recognized her as mortal and not a goddess, Arcite has the right to woo Emily.

Later, one of Arcite's friends begs Theseus to free his prisoner; Theseus agrees, but banishes Arcite. The love-struck knight returns, disguised as one of Theseus's servants. The story unfolds as each knight endures different challenges to prove his love for Emily.

Meanwhile, Palamon escapes the tower and pretends to be one of Emily's servants. Arcite finds Palamon one day and they organise a fight in order to see who will win Emily.

At the fight, Arcite wins, but then god Pluto causes an earthquake and so his horse topples over and crushes him. On his deathbed, Arcite apologizes, as they had once been as close as brothers and now they were rivals in love. Arcite tells Palamon to marry Emily, and then he dies. After a while, Palamon marries Emily.
