= Richard Edwardes =

16th-century English writer

Richard Edwardes (also Edwards, circa 1523 – 31 October 1566) was an English poet, playwright, and composer; he was made a Gentleman of the Chapel Royal, and was master of the singing boys. He was known for his comedies and interludes.

== Life ==
Richard Edwardes was born around 1523 in Somerset.

Edwardes began his studies at Corpus Christi College, Oxford in May 1540 and joined Christ Church, Oxford as it opened in 1546. He joined Lincoln's Inn but did not take up law as a career. He joined the Chapel Royal by 1557 and was appointed Master of the Children in 1561. He married Helene Griffith in 1563. After he died in 1566, he was succeeded by William Hunnis.

== Works ==
=== Plays ===
In 1566, Edwardes' Palamon and Arcite was performed before Elizabeth I at Oxford when the stage fell — three people died and five were injured as a result. Despite the tragic accident, the show continued to play that night.

The excellent Comedie of two the moste faithfullest Freendes, Damon and Pithias (written in 1564, published in 1571), a comedy, is his only extant play.

=== Poems ===
Ten of Edwardes' poems appear in the first edition of the Paradise of Dainty Devices, though publisher Henry Disle says the poems are "written for the most part by M. [Master] Edwards." Edwardes possibly compiled the manuscript on which the Paradise of Dainty Devices is based.

=== Verses on the court of Mary I ===
Verses by Edwardes around the year 1555 describe eight ladies in waiting to Mary I of England, and particularly praise the beauty of Jane Dormer, "of lively hue", and Frances Bayneham, "as beautiful as nature can devise". The ladies were named as Howard, Dacres, Baynam, Arundel, Dormer, Mansell, Margaret Cooke, and Bridges. The verses are found in a British Library manuscript, (Cotton MS Titus A XIV), and were not included in the Paradise.

=== Music ===
Edwardes was less well known as a composer, but several of his compositions survive, including three pieces in the Mulliner Book: "O the syllye man," ascribed to him by the book, and two anonymous pieces usually attributed to him, "In goinge to my naked bedde" and "When grypinge griefes." Other pieces include a song from Damon and Pithias, "Awake, ye woeful wights," and a setting of the Lord's Prayer in Richard Day's Psalter of 1563.

== Sources ==
- Paradise of Dainty Devices (linked below)
