= Oliver Wardrop =

British diplomat, traveller and translator

Sir John Oliver Wardrop KBE CMG (10 October 1864 – 19 October 1948) was a British diplomat, traveller and translator, primarily known as the United Kingdom's first Chief Commissioner of Transcaucasia in Georgia, 1919–20, and also as the founder and benefactor of Kartvelian studies at Oxford University.

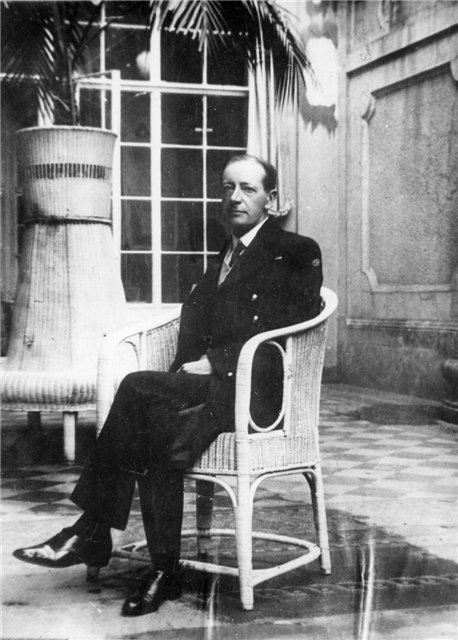
Oliver Wardrop in Tbilisi

After travelling to Georgia (then part of Imperial Russia) in 1887, Wardrop wrote his study The Kingdom of Georgia, published in 1888. In 1894 during his second journey to Georgia he mastered the Georgian language and published a series of books on Georgia, including his translation of Sulkhan-Saba Orbeliani's The Book of Wisdom and Lies.

From 1906 to 1910 Wardrop served as Consul to Romania at Bucharest, and in 1914 he was appointed Consul at Bergen, later Consul and then Consul-General for western Norway, remaining at Bergen.

In July 1919 the British Foreign Secretary Lord Curzon offered Wardrop the post of the first British Chief Commissioner of Transcaucasus in Tbilisi. The government of independent Georgia and its head Noe Zhordania welcomed Sir Oliver's return to Georgia. Wardrop, a capable diplomat, tried to promote Georgian culture and gather all the support from the west for the newly formed country under the threat of Bolshevik aggression. However, in February 1921 Soviet Russia's Red Army invaded Georgia, putting an end to the short-lived democratic republic.

In England, Wardrop organized the set-up of the Georgian Society and the Georgian Committee in London. In 1930, along with W.E.D. Allen, he formed the Georgian Historical Society which published its own journal Georgica. His sister Marjory Wardrop (1869–1909) translated the 12th-century Georgian epic by Shota Rustaveli, The Knight in the Panther's Skin into English.

Wardrop also catalogued the Georgian manuscripts at the British Museum and continued to add to the Wardrop Collection of Georgian books and manuscripts at the Bodleian Library.

In 1909 the Marjory Wardrop Fund at Oxford University was created by Wardrop after his sister's death. Through it, Wardrop augmented his collection, which now consists of 1,454 items, of which 215 are periodicals and 73 are series. Included are 74 MSS in the category of texts and collections of Georgian literature. Based on the legacy left by Sir John Oliver Wardrop and his sister Marjory, in 2003 the Oxford University Georgian Society was founded.

A statue of Oliver and Marjory, by Jumber Jikia, was unveiled on 18 October 2015, during the Tbilisoba festival, in Tbilisi's Oliver Wardrop Square, which itself opened during the 2014 Tbilisoba. A room in the National Library in the city also bears their names.

In 2014, the UK and Georgia inaugurated Wardrop dialogue, a format of strategic dialogue to promote strategic relations between two countries.

In October 2019 the Europe-Georgia Institute initiated the Oliver Wardrop Discussions to bring together British and Georgian politicians and young leaders and foster dialogue and cooperation between the countries. The first Wardrop Discussion was held on the 22-nd of October, 2019 and featured former Georgian Ambassador to the UK Giorgi Badridze, the representative of British Liberal Democrats Imad Ahmed and the head of the Europe-Georgia Institute George Melashvili.
