= The Book of the Wiles of Women =

The Book of the Wiles of Women (Spanish: El Libro de los Enganos e los Asayamientos de las Mugeres) is a medieval collection of stories, translated from Arabic into Spanish in 1253.

The translation was carried out at the request of Frederick of Castile, brother of king Alfonso X, from an unidentified Arabic version, although similar stories were already circulating in Europe in Latin works such as Petrus Alfonsi's Disciplina clericalis. The work is part of the 'Sindibad' or 'Seven Sages' tradition; the majority of the tales may have older origins in India.

== Text summary ==
A young prince, the son of Alcos, king of Judea, is placed under the tutelage of the wise man Sindibad. Just before he is to return to his father, Sindibad casts the prince's horoscope and warns him that if he should speak during the next seven days, he will be in grave peril. The prince therefore returns to the court mute, much to his father's dismay, while Sindibad retreats into hiding. While the prince is enduring his self-imposed silence, however, one of his father's favourite wives takes him aside and suggests that they should murder the king, marry, and rule together. In his anger, the prince breaks his silence to threaten to expose her at the end of the seven days, whereupon his stepmother accuses him of attempting to violate her, which causes the king to order his execution.

The sages who serve as the king's counsellors then seek to save the prince's life by telling a series of stories to the king which are designed to make him distrust his wife's tale by more generally casting doubt on the trustworthiness of women. The sages tell a total of thirteen tales: nine portray the wiles of women, three the dangers of precipitate action, and only one the wisdom of a virtuous wife. These tales are interspersed by others told by the accusing wife, which speak instead of the wickedness of men, particularly royal advisors. Finally, on the eighth day, the prince speaks, exposing his stepmother's treachery, and tells five tales to demonstrate the success of his education from Sindibad. Sindibad is ultimately honoured by the king, while the wicked wife is put to death.
