= The Fox, the Wolf and the Husbandman =

Poem by the 15th-century Scottish Robert Henryson

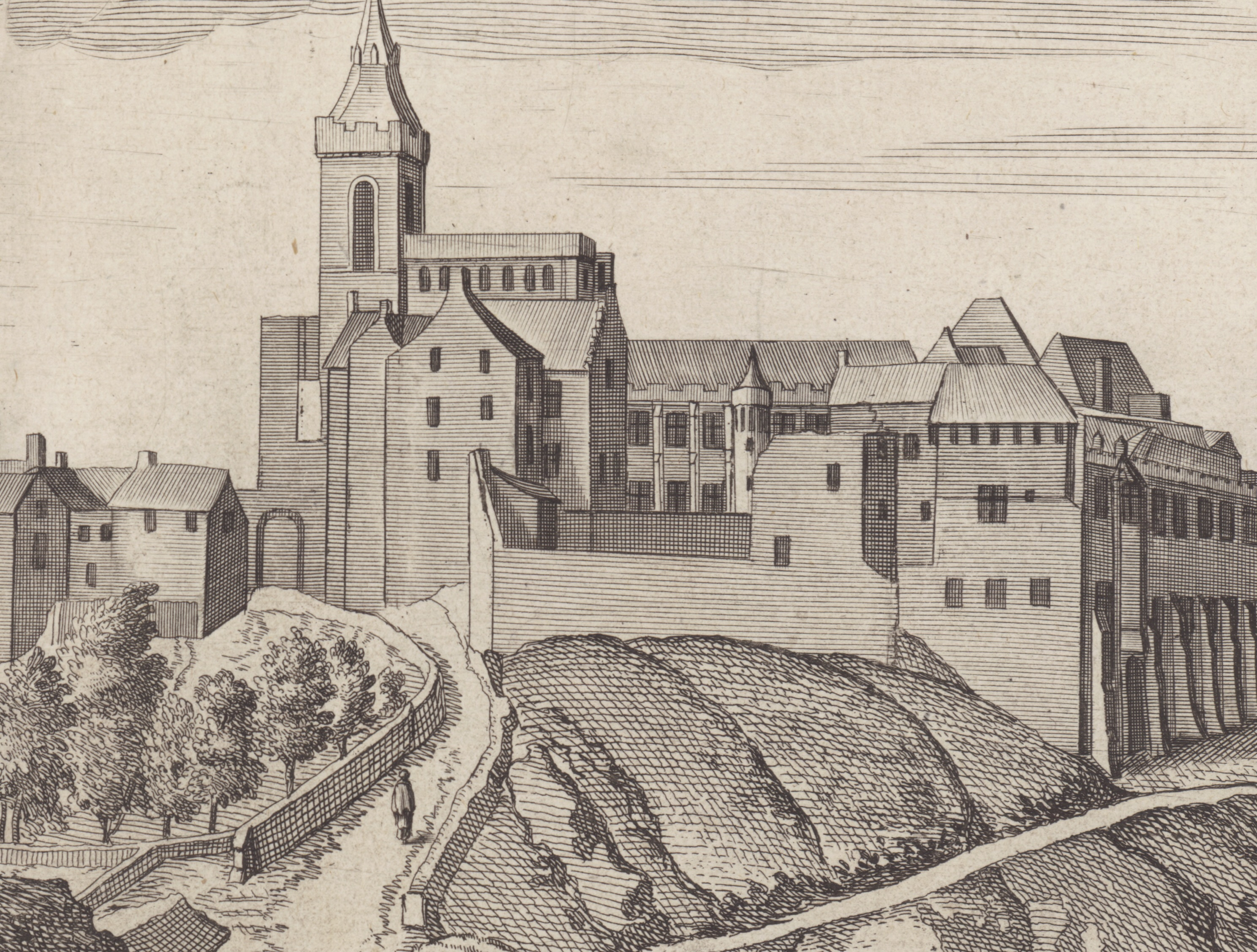
Dunfermline Abbey from a 17th-century engraving. Robert Henryson, author of The Morall Fabillis, was associated with the place.

The Fox, the Wolf and the Husbandman is a poem by the 15th-century Scottish poet Robert Henryson and part of his collection of moral fables known as the Morall Fabillis of Esope the Phrygian. It is written in Middle Scots. As with the other tales in the collection, appended to it is a moralitas which elaborates on the moral that the fable is supposed to contain. However, the appropriateness of the moralitas for the tale itself has been questioned.

The tale combines two motifs. Firstly, a husbandman tilling the fields with his new oxen makes a rash oath aloud to give them to the wolf; when the wolf overhears this, he attempts to make sure that the man fulfills his promise. The fox mediates a solution by speaking to them individually; eventually he fools the wolf into following him to claim his supposed reward for dropping the case, and tricks him into a draw-well. The moralitas connects the wolf to the wicked man, the fox to the devil, and the husbandman to the godly man. A probable source for the tale is Petrus Alfonsi's Disciplina Clericalis, containing the same motifs, and William Caxton's Aesop's Fables—though the tale is a beast fable, not Aesopic.

== Sources ==
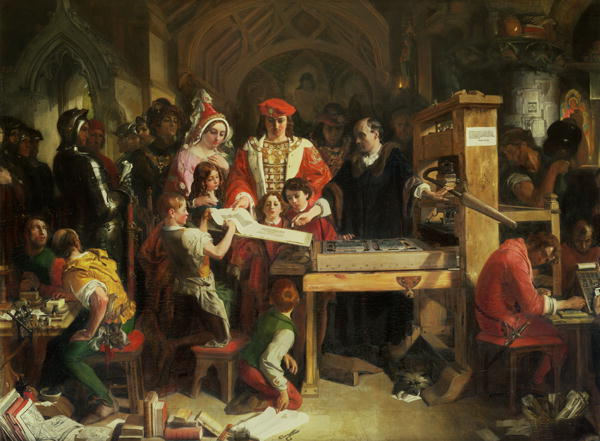
William Caxton (pictured centre-right), whose translation of Aesop's Fables was a probable source for the tale

A probable source of the tale is Petrus Alfonsi's Disciplina clericalis, which has the same three motifs: the rash promise of the husbandman; the wolf mistaking the moon for cheese; and the wolf that descends into the well via a bucket, thereby trapping himself and freeing the fox. However, the discussion of legality and the questioning of language that take place alongside these motifs are entirely Henryson's invention. Whereas the moral of Alfonsi's tale explains that the wolf lost both the oxen and the cheese because he "relinquished what was present for what was to come" (Latin: pro futuro quod presens erat dimisit), Henryson's moralitas more fully involves the husbandman.

Another source may be Aesop's Fables as published by William Caxton—scholar John MacQueen considers this more likely than Disciplina clericalis—although the tale itself is not Aesopic but rather of the beast fable (also beast-epic) genre. The plots of such works are more complicated than their Aesopic counterpart, tend more towards ribaldry, and feature the fox making a victim of the wolf.

== Synopsis ==
=== Tale ===
A husbandman tilling the fields with his new, untrained oxen is made furious by their wrecking of the land. In his anger he makes the rash oath that the wolf "mot have you all at anis! [may, at once]". However, the wolf is lying nearby with the fox, and, overhearing it, promises to make him stay true to his word. Eventually the oxen calm down, but on the way back home the wolf jumps into their path. The wolf asks where the husbandman is driving them, since they are not his, to which he confirms that they are and asks why he is being stopped since he never offended the wolf before. The wolf reminds the husbandman of his earlier declaration, to which he replies that a man may say things that do not mean anything. They argue, and the husbandman reproaches the wolf for not having a witness; in response, he produces the fox. The creature takes it upon himself to mediate the dispute, and takes each aside in turn. To the husbandman he says that he would lend his expertise to help him were it not for the "grit coist and expence" of doing so; the husbandman offers him half a dozen of the fattest hens he has, to which the fox accedes and goes off. To the wolf he says that the husbandman has offered an unparalleled block of cheese in exchange for him dropping the case.

The wolf, after some complaint, agrees to this and the two proceed through the woods after the prize—all the while the fox considers how to trick the wolf. Eventually, as the wolf complains of the fruitlessness of their quest, they arrive at a draw-well with buckets on each end of a rope. Seeing the reflection of the moon in the water at the bottom of the well, the wolf believes there to be cheese down there and lowers the fox down to pick it up. When he complains that it is too heavy for him to lift alone, the wolf jumps into the other bucket and descends to help. However, this pulls up the other bucket, into which the fox has jumped, and so the two swap places; the wolf at the bottom of the well and the fox safely escaped. The narrator professes that he does not know who helped the wolf out of the well, but that the tale is at an end.

=== Moralitas ===
The wolf is likened to a wicked man who oppresses others. The fox is likened to the devil. The farmer is likened to the godly man, with whom the fiend finds fault. The woods where the wolf was cheated are corrupting goods that man longs to get. The cheese represents covetousness; the well that contains it is fraud and fantasy, which draws men downwards into hell.

== Analysis ==
As with other tales in the collection, the moralitas of The Fox, the Wolf and the Husbandman can be considered at odds with the tale itself. Lianne Farber highlights a number of these discrepancies, and says that the allegory "does not hold true in any traditional sense". Amongst the inconsistencies is that the fox, not the wolf, is the figure that argues with and finds fault in the husbandman; the "woods of the world" are not traversed by the husbandman, in spite of the moralitas suggesting it is applicable to all men; Farber argues that even assuming the moral to be true is problematic, since it apparently suggests that the godly man must bribe the figure of the judge, and that this does not affect his godly status. Furthermore, the absence of the legal discussion and the binding quality of words from the moralitas suggests to Farber that the "intricate legal framework … has no impact whatsoever in resolving the issues with which it is supposed to deal". In contrast, Philippa M. Bright considers that the moralitas of this tale, as well as several others, create "an additional sense which co-exists with the literal narrative and extends and complements it thematically"; treating literal details symbolically and establishing the sense through direct comparisons.

According to Dorothy Yamamoto, the significant themes in the tale are "solidity and vacancy, substance and illusion". The cheese that apparently resides in the well is only an illusion, not a solid object, and similarly the fox creates a surface reconciliation between the wolf and the husbandman, but which betrays his real intentions. Through their frequent misuse, words that should convey real value are emptied of meaning. As an example, Yamamoto highlights the fox's taill on which the wolf and husbandman make their pledge—which body part she says is used by the fox in other tales to blind his foes, and is thereby a highly inappropriate object to use.
