= Marjory Wardrop =

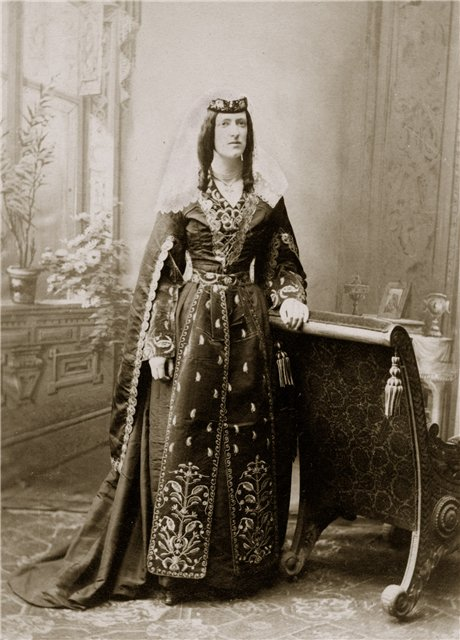
Marjory Wardrop dressed in Georgian national costume

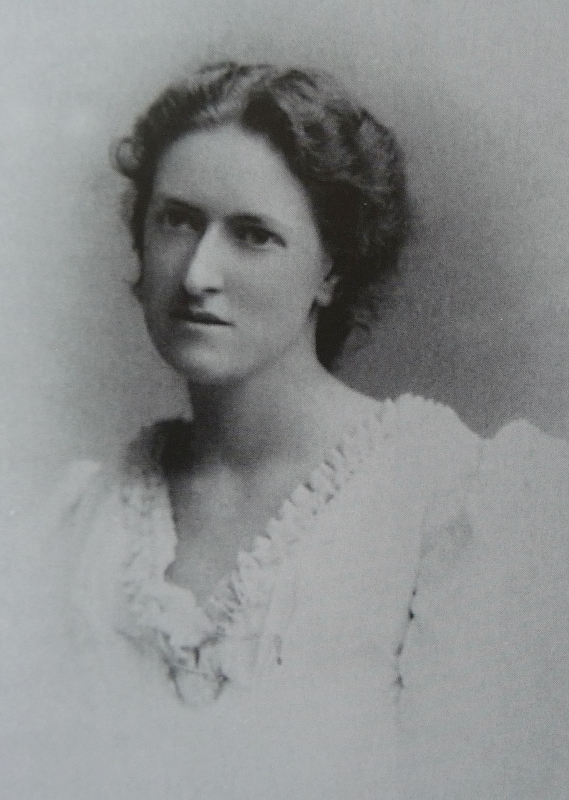
Marjory Wardrop

Marjory Scott Wardrop (11 November 1869 – 7 December 1909) was an English scholar and translator of Georgian literature. She was a sister of the British diplomat and scholar of Georgia, Sir Oliver Wardrop.

Fluent in seven foreign languages, she also learned Georgian and traveled to Georgia (then part of Imperial Russia) in 1894-5 and 1896. She translated and published Georgian Folk Tales (London, 1894), The Hermit by Ilia Chavchavadze (London, 1895), The Life of St. Nino (Oxford, 1900), etc. She also made the first English prose translation of The Knight in the Panther's Skin, a medieval Georgian epic poem by Shota Rustaveli (published by Oliver Wardrop in London, 1912). After her death, Sir Oliver created the Marjory Wardrop Fund at Oxford University "for the encouragement of the study of the language, literature, and history of Georgia, in Transcaucasia."

A statue of Marjory and Oliver, by Jumber Jikia, was unveiled on 18 October 2015, during the Tbilisoba festival, in Tbilisi's Oliver Wardrop Square, which itself opened during the 2014 Tbilisoba. A room in the National Library in the city also bears their names.
