= Cheese Factories on the Moon =

Book by Scott A. Frisch and Sean Q Kelly

Cheese Factories on the Moon: Why Earmarks are Good for American Democracy is a book by American political scientists Scott A. Frisch and Sean Q. Kelly. The title of the book was inspired by a quote by conservative Republican and former Senator Phil Gramm, who said:

If we should vote next week on whether to begin producing cheese in a factory on the moon, I almost certainly would oppose it...On the other hand, if the government decided to institute the policy, it would be my objective to see that a Texas contractor builds this celestial cheese plant, that the milk comes from Texas cows, and that the Earth distribution center is located in Texas.

Originally published in 2011, the book focuses on congressional appropriations earmarks.

== See also ==
- The Moon is made of green cheese
