= Atatürk Monument (Artvin) =

Monument in Artvin, Turkey

Coordinates: 41°10′15.0″N 41°49′44.6″E

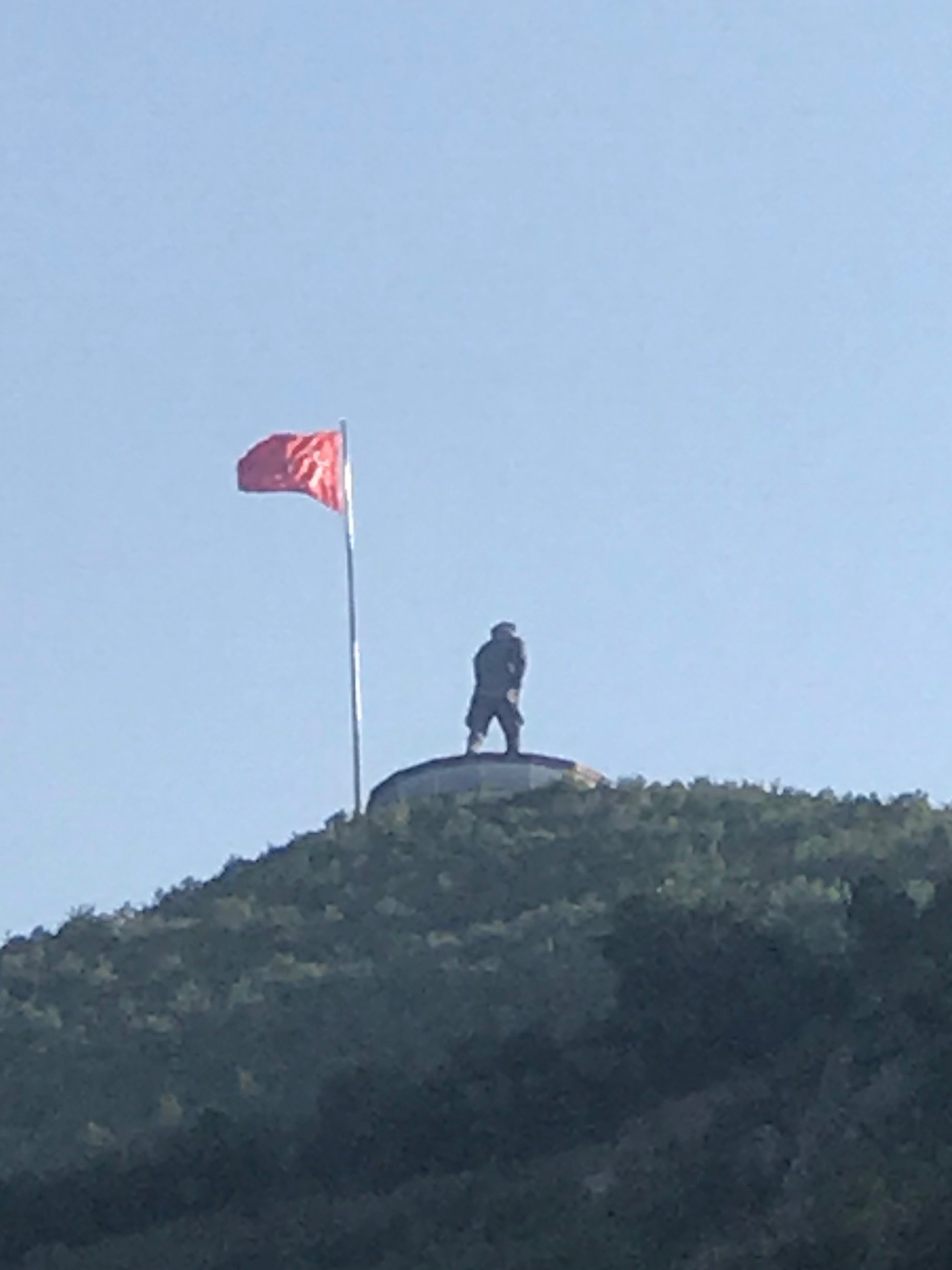
Atatürk Monument

The Atatürk Monument, also known as the Artvin Atatürk Statue, is a monument in Artvin, Turkey. The monument consists of the world's largest Atatürk statue made of steel and copper. The monument was completed in 2012 and unveiled in a ceremony in 2017. It is the most popular site in Artvin, with more than 35,000 visitors per year. The monument was sculpted by Georgian sculptor Jumber Jikia.
