= How the Daughter-in-Law Got the Coins =

Sri Lankan fairy tale

How the Daughter-in-Law Got the Coins is a Sri Lankan fairy tale collected by H. Parker in Village Folk-Tales of Ceylon.

It is Aarne–Thompson type 982, "The Pretended Inheritance".

== Synopsis ==
A man marries a rich woman who did not help his mother. He gives his mother a bag full of pottery shards. The mother contracts leprosy, but since she shakes the bags where the daughter-in-law can hear and announces that whoever cares for it will have, the daughter-in-law tends her. After the mother dies, the woman realizes it was shards, not coins.

== Variants ==
A medieval variant can be found in Disciplina Clericalis by Petrus Alfonsus. It's No.36 in the collection.

A Cossack variant was translated by Robert Nisbet Bain and included in Cossack Fairy Tales and Folk Tales.
