= Green cheese =

Type of under-ripe cheese

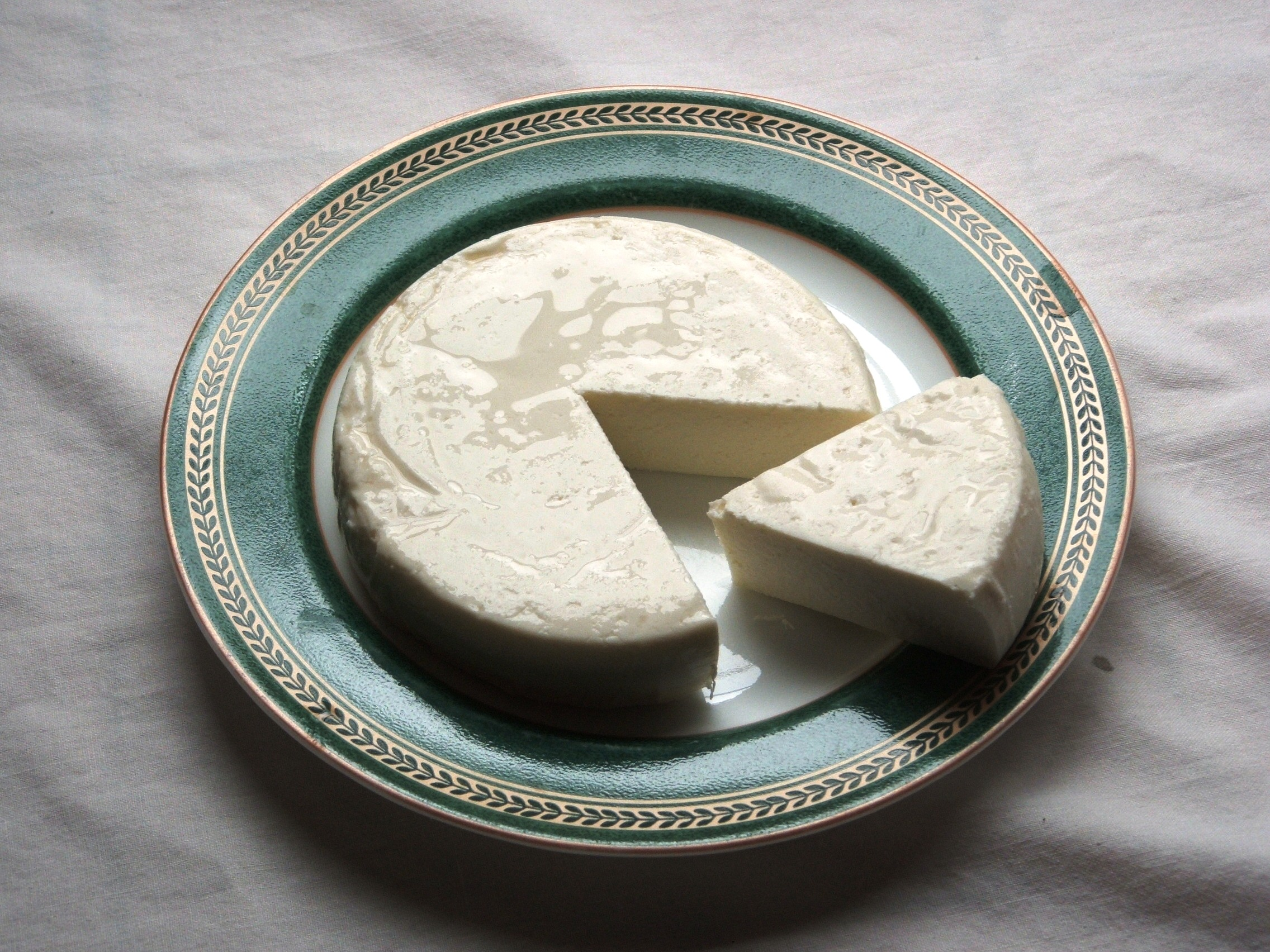
Queso fresco ("fresh cheese"), a green cheese, with typical white, round appearance

Green cheese is a fresh cheese that has not thoroughly dried nor aged, which is white in color and usually round in shape. The Oxford English Dictionary gives a reference from the year 1542 of the four sorts of cheese. The first sort is green cheese, which is not called "green" because of its color but for its newness or under-ripened state, for the whey is not half pressed out of it yet. The phrase is not commonly used to describe the color of a cheese, though there are some cheeses with a greenish tint, usually from mold or added herbs. There are other instances in which the word "green" is used to mean "new", such as in the term "greenhorn", which refers to an inexperienced person.

== In popular culture ==
The phrase "the Moon is made of green cheese" refers to the similarity in appearance of a typical round, green cheese and the full Moon. It is commonly misinterpreted to mean that the Moon is green, which isn't the case. (The surface of the Moon is quite dark and could be described as having the color of old, weathered black asphalt).

John Maynard Keynes made a reference comparing a green cheese to the moon in his 1936 book The General Theory of Employment, Interest and Money. The exact meaning of the sentence is debated, but the equating of the moon with a green cheese is clear:

Unemployment develops, that is to say, because people want the moon; — men cannot be employed when the object of desire (i.e. money) is something which cannot be produced and the demand for which cannot be readily choked off. There is no remedy but to persuade the public that green cheese is practically the same thing and to have a green cheese factory (i.e. a central bank) under public control.

There is a popular saying in Scotland, "You can't see green cheese go past you." This means that you must have whatever someone else has just for the sake of having it. For example, a child's friend may get a bike and although the child is unable to ride a bike, they will pester their parents to buy one.

The following West Frisian language shibboleth makes reference to it: "Bûter en brea en griene tsiis, hwa't dat net sizze kin is gjin oprjuchte Frys." meaning "Butter and bread and green cheese, who can't say that is no true Frisian."

== Cheeses that are green ==
The veins of most blue cheese are in fact a dark bluish-green. There are several varieties of cheese which are actually green or pale green in color. Green cheese varieties include:

- Cherni Vit - Green cheese from Bulgaria
- Sage Derby
- Schabziger - Swiss green cheese
- Y Fenni - Welsh green cheese

Other cheeses exist which are wholly or partly green due to the addition of herbs.
