= The Book of Wisdom and Lies =

Georgian tales by Sulchan-Saba Orbeliani

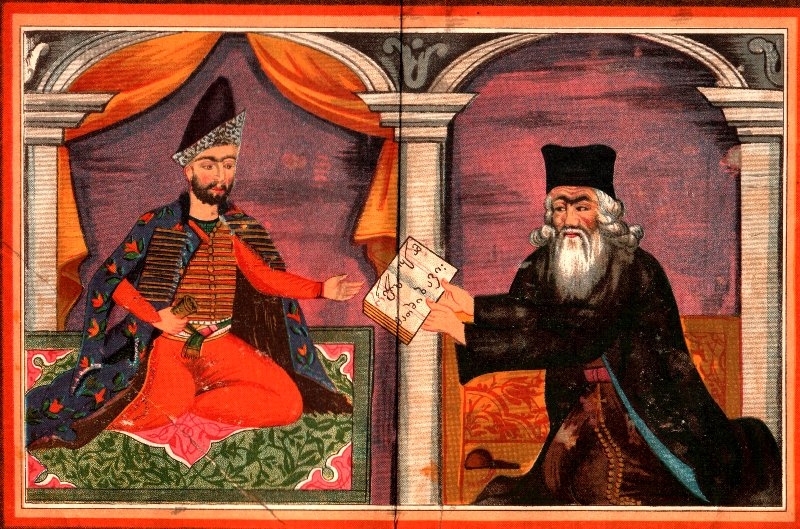
- Author: Sulkhan-Saba Orbeliani
- Language: Georgian
- Genre: Fable, Picaresque novel, Grotesque, Allegory
- Publication date: 1686–1695
- Publication place: Georgia

The Book of Wisdom and Lies (Georgian: წიგნი სიბრძნე სიცრუისა, romanized: ts'igni sibrdzne sitsruisa) is a collection of fables and tales written by Sulkhan-Saba Orbeliani between 1686 and 1695, when he was 20–25 years old.

The book reflects his observations about life. Sulkhan-Saba skillfully presents many interesting and complicated aspects of human nature and gives his opinions and explanations. He gives answers to many questions and brings one to realization that a human should be kind. Translator Oliver Wardrop calls Orbeliani's style "beautifully concise and epigrammatic".

A frame story involves disputes between King Phonez, his vizier Sedrak, his eunuch Ruka, his son Djumber, and Djumber's tutor Leon. The disputants make their points with dozens of stories, which form the bulk of the text. The individual tales occur in settings ranging from France to India, and derive from Georgian folklore, near-Eastern literature more generally (e.g. One Thousand and One Nights), and even the author's own experiences in Europe.

A bowdlerized English translation by Oliver Wardrop was published by William Morris at the Kelmscott Press in 1894. Another translation, by Katharine Vivian, was published by the Octagon Press in 1982.
