= Credulity =

Willingness or ability to believe that a statement is true

Credulity is a person's willingness or ability to believe that a statement is true, especially on minimal or uncertain evidence. Credulity is not necessarily a belief in something that may be false: the subject of the belief may even be correct, but a credulous person will believe it without good evidence.

== Meaning ==
The words gullible and credulous are commonly used as synonyms. Goepp & Kay (1984) state that while both words mean "unduly trusting or confiding", gullibility stresses being duped or made a fool of, suggesting a lack of intelligence, whereas credulity stresses uncritically forming beliefs, suggesting a lack of skepticism. Jewell (2006) states the difference is a matter of degree: the gullible are "the easiest to deceive", while the credulous are "a little too quick to believe something, but they usually aren't stupid enough to act on it."

Yamagishi, Kikuchi & Kosugi (1999) characterize a gullible person as one who is both credulous and naïve. Greenspan (2009) stresses the distinction that gullibility involves an action in addition to a belief, and there is a cause-effect relationship between the two states: "gullible outcomes typically come about through the exploitation of a victim's credulity.

== Examples ==
Pseudoscience, a methodology, belief, or practice that is claimed to be scientific, or that is made to appear to be scientific, but which does not adhere to an appropriate scientific methodology, lacks supporting evidence or plausibility, or otherwise lacks scientific status. Professor Paul DeHart Hurd argued that a large part of gaining scientific literacy is "being able to distinguish science from pseudo-science such as astrology, quackery, the occult, and superstition".

A snipe hunt, a form of wild-goose chase that is also known as a fool's errand, is a type of practical joke that involves experienced people making fun of credulous newcomers by giving them an impossible or imaginary task. The origin of the term is a practical joke where inexperienced campers are told about a bird or animal called the snipe as well as a usually preposterous method of catching it, such as running around the woods carrying a bag or making strange noises.

In literature, Lewis Carroll provides a discussion of credulity in his 1871 novel Through the Looking-Glass:

Alice laughed. 'There's no use trying,' she said, 'one can't believe impossible things.'
'I daresay you haven't had much practice,' said the Queen. 'When I was your age, I always did it for half-an-hour a day. Why, sometimes I've believed as many as six impossible things before breakfast. [...]'

== See also ==
- Delusion
- Faith
- Fallacy
- Moon is made of green cheese
- Noble lie
- Scepticism
- Stupidity
- Superstition
