= Walcher of Malvern =

11th-century astrologer

Walcher of Malvern (died 1135) (also known as Walcher of Lorraine) was the second Prior of Great Malvern Priory in Worcestershire, England, and a noted astronomer, astrologer and mathematician. He has been described as an important transitional figure, whose observations and writings reflected the transformation of the astronomy of the Latin West from its traditional focus on computing dates in the ecclesiastical calendar and studying the rudiments of Roman astronomy to the use of ancient astronomical computational methods learned from Arabic zijes and other Islamic sources.

== Life and work ==
Walcher was from Lotharingia, a region influenced by the new scientific ideas coming from Spain, and arrived in England around 1091. Using an astrolabe to measure the time of several solar and lunar eclipses with an accuracy of about fifteen minutes, he computed a set of tables giving the time of the new moons from 1036 through 1111, which were considered important for medical astrology. His later observations revealed significant errors in his tables, reflecting the limitations of early medieval astronomical theory.

In his later De Dracone (ca. 1116), Walcher drew on the knowledge of Arabic astronomy that his master, Petrus Alfonsi, had brought from Spain. De Dracone discussed the motion of the lunar nodes (the head and tail of the dragon) and their significance for the computation of lunar and solar eclipses. In De Dracone, Walcher recorded angles in degrees, minutes, and seconds, although he wrote these numbers using Roman, rather than Arabic numerals.

Walcher was Prior of Malvern Priory from 1120 to 1135. Walcher's gravestone in St Anne's Chapel at the Priory Church records his abilities:

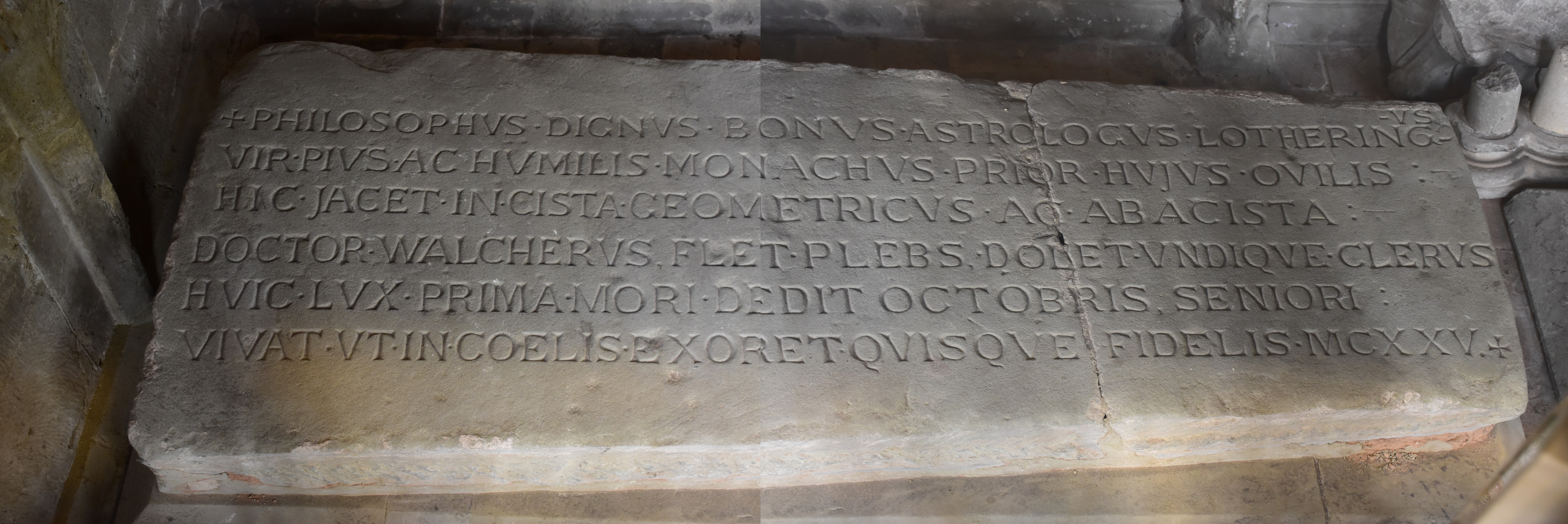
Gravestone of Walcher in Great Malvern Priory

Philosophus dignus, bonus astrologus lotharingus,
Vir pius et humilis, monachus, prior hujus ovilis
Hic jacet in cista geometricus et abacista,
Doctor Walcherus; flet plebs, dolet undique clerus;
Huic lux prima mori dedit Octobris seniori;
Vivat ut in coelis exoret quisque fidelis. MCXXXV.

"In this chest lies Doctor Walcher, a worthy philosopher, a good astronomer, a Lotharingian, a pious and humble man, a monk, the prior of his sheepfold, a geometer and abacist. The people mourn, the clergy grieve on all sides. The first day of October brought death to this elderly man. May each believer pray that he may live in heaven. 1135."

As head of the Priory he would have been a very influential figure in the county of Worcestershire.
