= The Princess and the Tin Box =

"The Princess and the Tin Box" is a short story by James Thurber in the form of a modern fable. It was first published in the September 29, 1945 edition of The New Yorker magazine and republished in 1948 in Thurber's The Beast in Me and Other Animals: A New Collection of Pieces and Drawings about Human Beings and Less Alarming Creatures. The story is widely used as a text in schools for teaching both writing skills and reading comprehension.
