= Rtveli =

Georgian harvest holiday

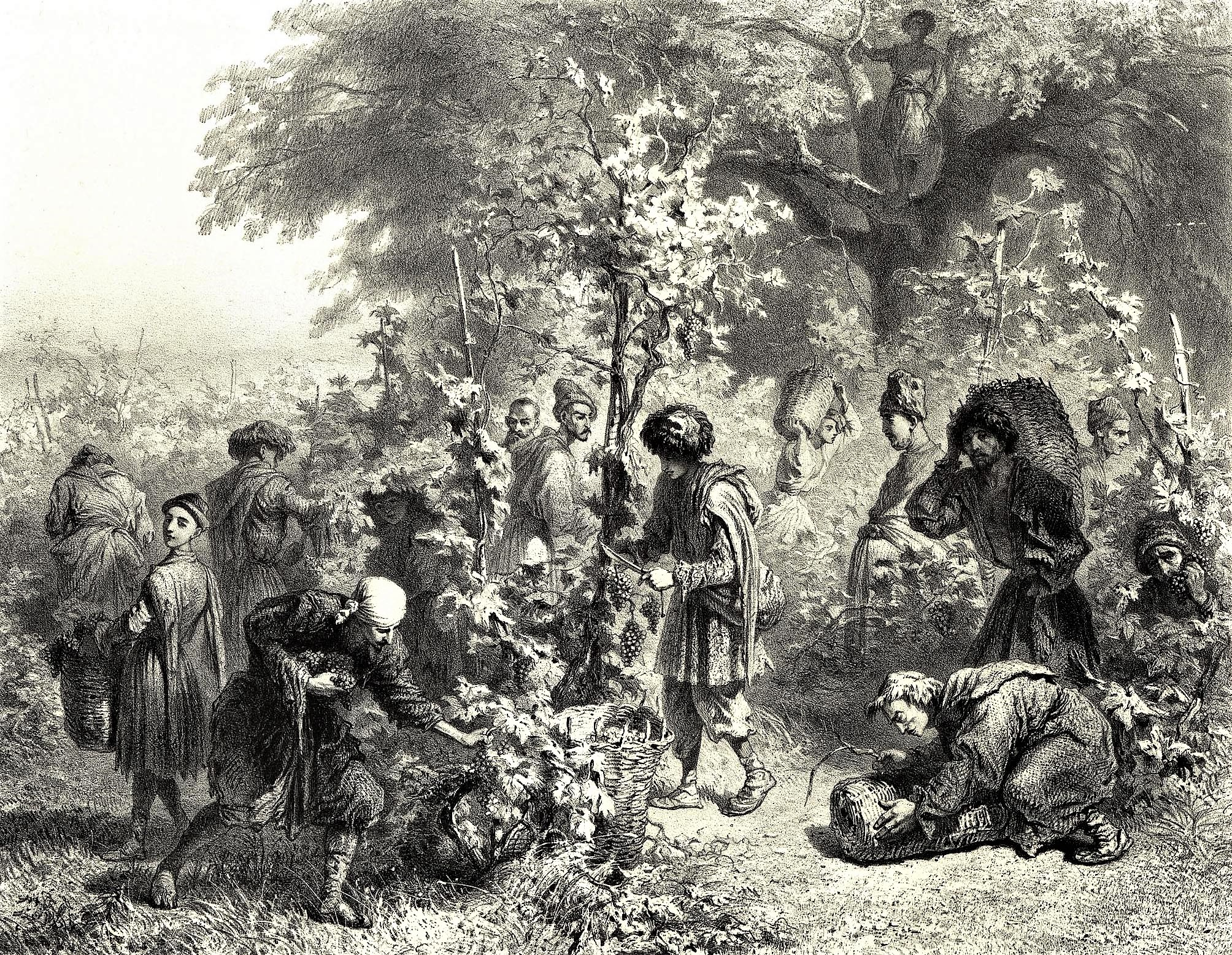
Rtveli in Kakhetia by Grigory Gagarin, 1847

Rtveli (Georgian: რთველი) is a traditional vintage and rural harvest holiday in Georgia accompanied by feasts, musical events and other celebrations. It normally takes place in late September in eastern Georgia and in mid-October in western Georgia.

In Georgia, where wine has an iconic significance, the tradition of rtveli dates back to ancient times, having its roots in the festivity of mid-Autumn abundance and variety. Rtveli usually lasts for several days, with people starting working in early morning hours and ending the day with a feast in the accompaniment of vintage-themed folk songs.

== See also ==
- Georgian wine
- Tbilisoba
