= Jumber Jikia =

Sculptor from country of Georgia, born 1950

- ჯუმბერ ჯიქია
- Born: 12 October 1950; Georgia
- Alma mater: Tbilisi State Academy of Arts
- Occupation: Sculptor
- Awards: State Award Laureate, 1989

Jumber Jikia (Georgian: ჯუმბერ ჯიქია; b. 1950) is a sculptor from Georgia.

Jikia was born on 12 October 1950. He studied at Tbilisi School of Art, and then Tbilisi State Academy of Arts, where he was later a lecturer.

His public works in Tbilisi include a statue of Oliver and Marjory Wardrop, unveiled on 18 October 2015, during the Tbilisoba festival, in Tbilisi's Oliver Wardrop Square; and one of Václav Havel unveiled on 22 June 2017 by President of Georgia Giorgi Margvelashvili and Czech Defense Minister Martin Stropnicky.

Two of his Horses of the Wind are in Rustavi.

Outside Georgia, his works are on public display in Egypt (History Steps 2008), and Cappadocia, Turkey (History Steps 2009).

He also sculpted a 22m tall, 60 ton, colossal steel-framed copper statue of Mustafa Kemal Atatürk for the Assembly Hall at Artvin in Turkey.

Dying Centaur is in the collection of the Polish Sculpture Center.

== Awards ==
- 1985: Fanano Arte First Prize
- 1986: Gold Medal, Warsaw
- 1984: Gold Medal Rmn-Grand Palais, Paris
- 1989: State Award Laureate
