= Fable =

Short fictional story that anthropomorphises non-humans to illustrate a moral lesson

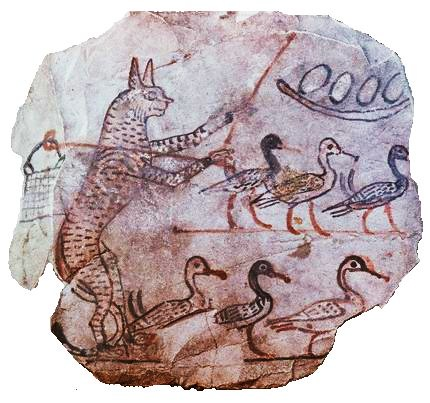
Anthropomorphic cat guarding geese, Egypt, c. 1120 BCE

Fable is a literary genre defined as a succinct fictional story, in prose or verse, that features animals, legendary creatures, plants, inanimate objects, or forces of nature that are anthropomorphised, and that illustrates or leads to a particular moral lesson (a "moral"), which may at the end be added explicitly as a concise maxim or saying.

A fable differs from a parable in that the latter excludes animals, plants, inanimate objects, and forces of nature as actors that assume speech or other powers of humankind. Conversely, an animal tale specifically includes talking animals as characters.

Usage has not always been so clearly distinguished. In the King James Version of the New Testament, "μῦθος" ("mythos") was rendered by the translators as "fable" in the First Epistle to Timothy, the Second Epistle to Timothy, the Epistle to Titus and the First Epistle of Peter.

== Global history ==
The fable is an enduring form of folk literature, spread abroad less by literary anthologies than by oral transmission. Fables appear throughout a number of cultures throughout history.

=== Aesopic or Aesop's fable ===
The varying corpus denoted Aesopica or Aesop's Fables includes most of the best-known western fables, which are attributed to the legendary Aesop, supposed to have been a slave in ancient Greece around 550 BCE. When Babrius set down fables from the Aesopica in verse for a Hellenistic Prince "Alexander", he expressly stated at the head of Book II that this type of "myth" that Aesop had introduced to the "sons of the Hellenes" had been an invention of "Syrians" from the time of "Ninos" (personifying Nineveh to Greeks) and Belos ("ruler"). Epicharmus of Kos and Phormis are reported as having been among the first to invent comic fables. Many familiar fables of Aesop include "The Crow and the Pitcher", "The Tortoise and the Hare" and "The Lion and the Mouse".

In the first century AD, Phaedrus (died 50 AD) produced Latin translations in iambic verse of fables then circulating under the name of Aesop. While Phaedrus's Latinisations became classic (transmitted through the Middle Ages, though attributed to a certain Romulus, now considered legendary), the writing of fables in Greek did not stop; in the 2nd century AD, Babrius wrote beast fables in Greek in the manner of Aesop, which would also become influential in the Middle Ages (and sometimes transmitted as Aesop's work).

In ancient Greek and Roman education, the fable was the first of the progymnasmata—training exercises in prose composition and public speaking, wherein students would be asked to learn fables, expand upon them, invent their own, and finally use them as persuasive examples in longer forensic or deliberative speeches. The need of instructors to teach, and students to learn, a wide range of fables as material for their declamations resulted in their being gathered together in collections, like those of Aesop.

=== Africa ===
African oral culture has a rich story-telling tradition. The Anansi oral story originates from the tribes of Ghana. "All Stories Are Anansi's" was translated by Harold Courlander and Albert Kofi Prempeh and tells the story of a god-like creature Anansi who wishes to own all stories in the world. The character Anansi is often depicted as a spider and is known for its cunning nature to obtain what it wants, typically seen outwitting other animal characters.

=== India ===
India has a rich tradition of fables, many derived from traditional stories and related to local natural elements. Indian fables often teach a particular moral. In some stories the gods have animal aspects, while in others the characters are archetypal talking animals similar to those found in other cultures. Hundreds of fables were composed in ancient India during the first millennium BCE, often as stories within frame stories. Indian fables have a mixed cast of humans and animals. The dialogues are often longer than in fables of Aesop and often comical as the animals try to outwit one another by trickery and deceit. In Indian fables, humanity is not presented as superior to the animals. Prime examples of the fable in India are the Panchatantra and the Jataka tales. These included Vishnu Sarma's Panchatantra, the Hitopadesha, Vikram and The Vampire, and Syntipas' Seven Wise Masters, which were collections of fables that were later influential throughout the Old World. Ben E. Perry (compiler of the "Perry Index" of Aesop's fables) has argued controversially that some of the Buddhist Jataka tales and some of the fables in the Panchatantra may have been influenced by similar Greek and Near Eastern ones. Earlier Indian epics such as Vyasa's Mahabharata and Valmiki's Ramayana also contained fables within the main story, often as side stories or back-story. The most famous folk stories from the Near East were the One Thousand and One Nights, also known as the Arabian Nights.

The Panchatantra is an ancient Indian assortment of fables. The earliest recorded work, ascribed to Vishnu Sharma, dates to around 300 BCE. The tales are likely much older than the compilation, having been passed down orally prior to the book's compilation. The word "Panchatantra" is a blend of the words "pancha" (which means "five" in Sanskrit) and "tantra" (which means "weave"). It implies weaving together multiple threads of narrative and moral lessons together to form a book.

=== Europe ===
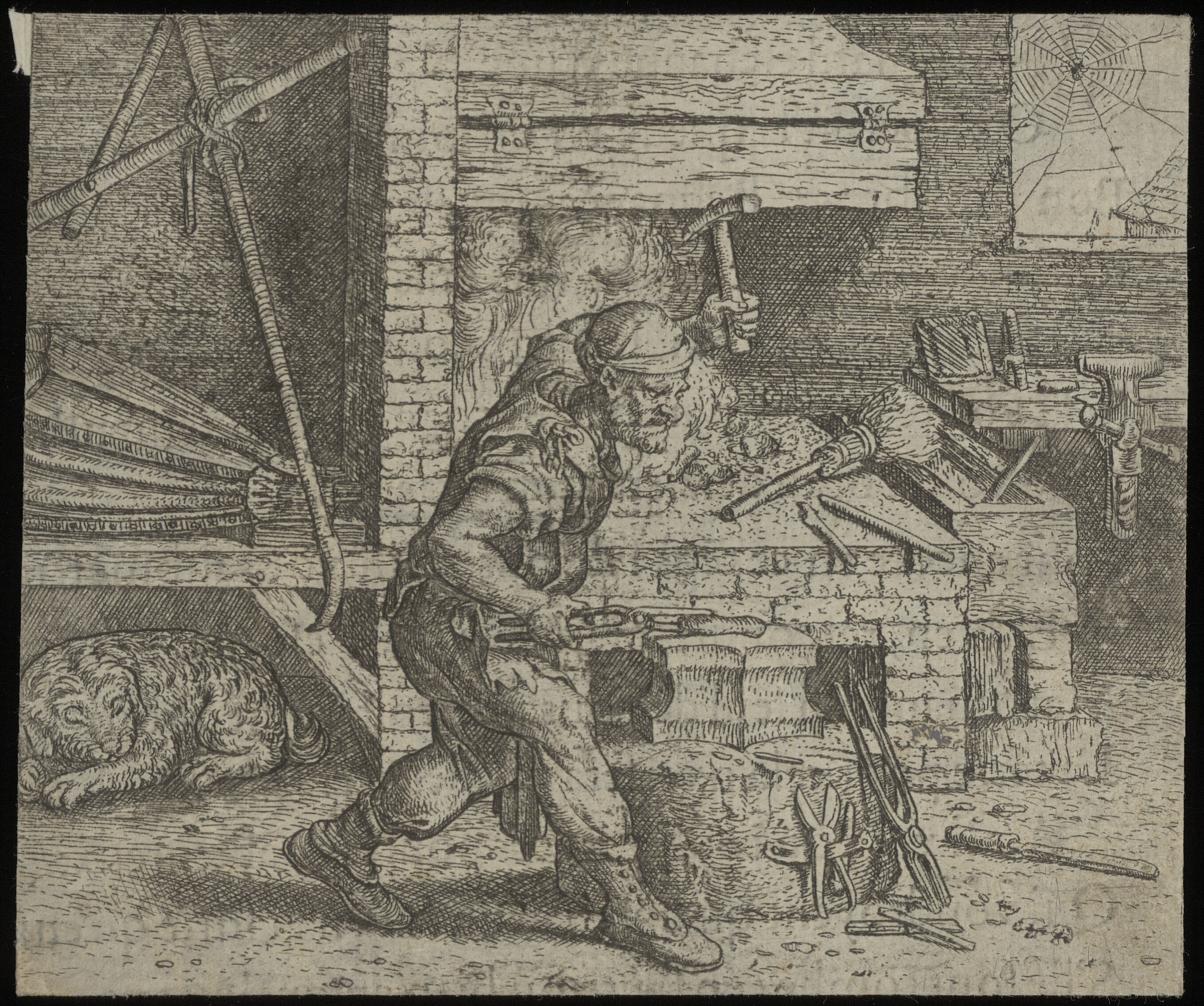
Printed image of the fable of the blacksmith and the dog from the sixteenth century

Fables had a further long tradition through the Middle Ages and became part of European high literature. The Roman writer Avianus (active around 400 AD) wrote Latin fables mostly based on Babrius, using very little material from Aesop. Fables attributed to Aesop circulated widely in collections bearing the title of Romulus (as though an author named Romulus had translated and rewritten them, though today most scholars regard this Romulus to be a legendary figure). Many of these Latin version were in fact Phaedrus's 1st-century versified Latinisations. Collections titled Romulus inspired a flurry of medieval authors to newly translate (sometimes into local vernaculars), versify and rewrite fables. Among them, Adémar de Chabannes (11th century), Alexander Neckam (12th century, Novus Aesopus and shorter Novus Avianus), Gualterus Anglicus (12th century) and Marie de France (12th-13th century) wrote fables adapted from models generally understood to be Aesop, Avianus or the so-called "Romulus".

In the later Middle Ages, Aesop's fables were newly gathered and edited with a prefatory biography of Aesop. This biography, usually simply titled Life of Aesop (Vita Aesopi), is more invented than factual, and itself a sort of moralistic fable; known in several versions, this Aesop Romance, as scholars term it today, enjoyed nearly as much fame as the fables themselves by the end of the fifteenth century. The most common version of this tale-like biography is attributed to the Byzantine scholar Maximus Planudes (1260–1310), who also gathered and edited fables for posterity. In the Renaissance, Aesopic fables were hugely popular. They were published in luxurious illuminated manuscripts, such as the so-called "Medici Aesop" made around 1480 in Florence based on the corpus established by Planudes, probably for the son of Lorenzo de' Medici (now kept in the New York Public Library). Early on, Aesopic fables were also disseminated in print, usually with Planudes's Life of Aesop as a preface. The German humanist Heinrich Steinhöwel published a bilingual (Latin and German) edition of the fables in Ulm in 1476. This publication gave rise to many re-editions of the sole German prose translation (known as the Esopus or Esopus teutsch). It became one of the great bestsellers of the last decades of the fifteenth century. Several authors adapted or versified fables from this corpus, such as the German poet and playwright Burkard Waldis, whose versified Esopus of 1548 was influential. Even the artist and polymath Leonardo da Vinci (1452–1519) composed some fables in his native Florentine dialect.

During the 17th century, the French fabulist Jean de La Fontaine (1621–1695) saw the soul of the fable in the moral—a rule of behavior. Starting with the Aesopian pattern, La Fontaine set out to satirise the court, the church, the rising bourgeoisie, indeed the entire human scene of his time. La Fontaine's model was subsequently emulated by England's John Gay (1685–1732); Poland's Ignacy Krasicki (1735–1801); Italy's Lorenzo Pignotti (1739–1812); Serbia's Dositej Obradović (1745–1801); Spain's Tomás de Iriarte y Oropesa (1750–1791); France's Jean-Pierre Claris de Florian (1755–1794); and Russia's Ivan Krylov (1769–1844).

== Contemporary works ==
In contemporary periods, while the fable has been trivialized in children's books, it has also been fully adapted to modern adult literature.

During the 1880s, Irish-American journalist and folklorist Joel Chandler Harris wrote African-American fables in the Southern context of slavery under the name of Uncle Remus. His stories (including the animal characters Brer Rabbit, Brer Fox, and Brer Bear) are modern examples of story-telling that have been praised by scholars like Louis D. Rubin Jr. Harris' work has also received criticism, however; according to Rubin, Harris seemed to perpetuate segregationist ideology, as well as glamorize the background and role of slaves in his stories.

Felix Salten's Bambi (1923) is a Bildungsroman—a story of a protagonist's coming of age—cast in the form of a fable. James Thurber used the ancient fable style in his books Fables for Our Time (1940) and Further Fables for Our Time (1956), and in his stories "The Princess and the Tin Box" in The Beast in Me and Other Animals (1948) and "The Last Clock: A Fable for the Time, Such As It Is, of Man" in Lanterns and Lances (1961). Władysław Reymont's The Revolt (1922), a metaphor for the Bolshevik Revolution of 1917, described a revolt by animals that take over their farm in order to introduce "equality". George Orwell's Animal Farm (1945) similarly satirized Stalinist Communism in particular, and totalitarianism in general, in the guise of animal fable.

In the 21st century, the Neapolitan writer and painter Sabatino Scia is the author of over a hundred fables. The characters are not only animals, but also things, beings, and elements from nature—all playing the role of revealer of human society. In addition to these writings, Scia also uses painting as a medium for his fables: his collection "Не забувати ніколи" [Never forget], for example, is a commentary on the Holodomor. In Latin America, the brothers Juan and Victor Ataucuri Garcia have also contributed to the resurgence of the fable. But they do so with a novel idea: use the fable as a means of dissemination of traditional literature of that place. In the book Fábulas Peruanas, published in 2003, they have collected myths, legends, and beliefs of Andean and Amazonian Peru, to write as fables.

African-American and award-winning author Octavia E. Butler, though having published work since 1971, has made a resurgence in popular media nearly twenty years after her death in 2006. With what The MacArthur Foundation describes as "transcendent fables", her stories address social issues such as climate change and racial inequality in a way that is still relevant to many of her readers.

== Classic ==
- Aesop (mid-6th century BCE), author/s of Aesop's Fables
- Vishnu Sarma (c. 200 BCE), author of the anthropomorphic political treatise and fable collection, the Panchatantra
- Bidpai (c. 200 BCE), author of Sanskrit (Hindu) and Pali (Buddhist) animal fables in verse and prose, sometimes derived from Jataka tales
- Syntipas (c. 100 BCE), Indian philosopher, reputed author of a collection of tales known in Europe as The Story of the Seven Wise Masters
- Gaius Julius Hyginus (Hyginus, Latin author, native of Spain or Alexandria, c. 64 BCE – 17 CE), author of the Fabulae
- Phaedrus (15 BCE – 50 CE), Roman fabulist, by birth a Macedonian
- Nizami Ganjavi (Persian, 1141–1209)
- Walter of England (12th century), Anglo-Norman poet, published Aesop's Fables in distichs c. 1175
- Marie de France (12th century)
- Jalāl ad-Dīn Muhammad Balkhī (Persian, 1207–1273)
- Vardan Aygektsi (died 1250), Armenian priest and fabulist
- Berechiah ha-Nakdan (Berechiah the Punctuator, or Grammarian, 13th century), author of Jewish fables adapted from Aesop's Fables
- Robert Henryson (Scottish, 15th century), author of The Morall Fabillis of Esope the Phrygian
- Leonardo da Vinci (Italian, 1452–1519)
- Biernat of Lublin (Polish, 1465? – after 1529)
- Jean de La Fontaine (French, 1621–1695)
- Sulkhan-Saba Orbeliani (Georgian, 1658–1725), author of The Book of Wisdom and Lies
- Bernard de Mandeville (English, 1670–1733), author of The Fable of the Bees
- John Gay (English, 1685–1732)
- Christian Fürchtegott Gellert (German, 1715–1769)
- Gotthold Ephraim Lessing (German, 1729–1781)
- Ignacy Krasicki (Polish, 1735–1801), author of Fables and Parables (1779) and New Fables (published 1802)
- Dositej Obradović (Serbian, 1739–1811)
- Félix María de Samaniego (Spanish, 1745–1801), best known for "The Ant and the Cicada"
- Tomás de Iriarte (Spanish, 1750–1791)
- Jean-Pierre Claris de Florian, (French, 1755–1794), author of Fables (published 1802)
- Ivan Dmitriev (Russia, 1760–1837)
- Ivan Krylov (Russian, 1769–1844)
- Hans Christian Andersen (Danish, 1805–1875)

== Modern ==
- Leo Tolstoy (1828–1910)
- Rafael Pombo (1833–1912), Colombian fabulist, poet, writer
- Ambrose Bierce (1842–?1914)
- Joel Chandler Harris (1848–1908)
- Sholem Aleichem (1859–1916)
- George Ade (1866–1944), Fables in Slang, etc.
- Władysław Reymont (1868–1925)
- Felix Salten (1869–1945)
- Don Marquis (1878–1937), author of the fables of archy and mehitabel
- Franz Kafka (1883–1924)
- Damon Runyon (1884–1946)
- James Thurber (1894–1961), Fables for Our Time and Further Fables for Our Time
- George Orwell (1903–1950)
- Dr. Seuss (1904–1991)
- Isaac Bashevis Singer (1904–1991)
- Nankichi Niimi (1913–1943), Japanese author and poet
- Sergey Mikhalkov (1913–2009), Soviet author of children's books
- Pierre Gamarra (1919–2009)
- Richard Adams (1920–2016), author of Watership Down
- José Saramago (1922–2010), Portuguese writer, author of Ensaio sobre a cegueira
- Italo Calvino (1923–1985), Cosmicomics etc.
- Arnold Lobel (1933–87), author of Fables, winner 1981 Caldecott Medal
- Ramsay Wood (born 1943), author of Kalila and Dimna: Fables of Friendship and Betrayal
- Bill Willingham (born 1956), author of Fables graphic novels
- David Sedaris (born 1956), author of Squirrel Seeks Chipmunk
- Hayao Miyazaki (born 1941), Japanese filmmaker, director of Spirited Away
- Guillermo del Toro (born 1964), Mexican filmmaker, director of Pan's Labyrinth
- Pendleton Ward (born 1982), American animator, creator of Adventure Time

== Notable fable collections ==
- Aesop's Fables by Aesop
- Jataka tales
- Panchatantra by Vishnu Sarma
- Baital Pachisi (also known as Vikram and The Vampire)
- Hitopadesha
- Kalīla wa-Dimna
- A Book of Wisdom and Lies by Sulkhan-Saba Orbeliani
- Seven Wise Masters by Syntipas
- One Thousand and One Nights (also known as Arabian Nights, c. 800–900)
- Fables (1668–1694) by Jean de La Fontaine
- Fables and Parables (1779) by Ignacy Krasicki
- Fairy Tales (1837) by Hans Christian Andersen
- Uncle Remus: His Songs and His Sayings (1881) by Joel Chandler Harris
- Fantastic Fables (1899) by Ambrose Bierce
- Fables for Our Time (1940) by James Thurber
- 99 Fables (1960) by William March
- Collected Fables (2000) by Ambrose Bierce, edited by S. T. Joshi

== Bibliography ==
- Buckham, Philip Wentworth (1827). Theatre of the Greeks. J. Smith. "The Theatre of the Greeks."
- King James Bible; New Testament (authorised).
- DLR [David Lee Rubin]. "Fable in Verse", The New Princeton Encyclopedia of Poetry and Poetics.
- Read fables by Aesop and La Fontaine
