= Sulkhan-Saba Orbeliani =

Georgian prince, writer, and monk (1658–1725)

Sulkhan-Saba Orbeliani სულხან-საბა ორბელიანი
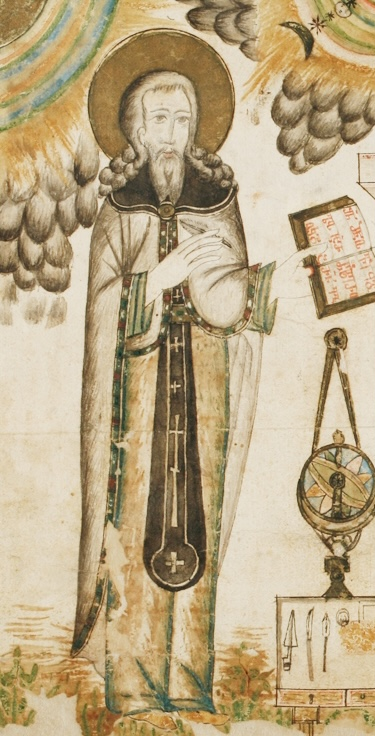
- Miniature of Sulkhan-Saba, 1700s
- Born: November 3, 1658; Tandzia, Kingdom of Kartli, Safavid Empire
- Died: January 26, 1725 (aged 66); Moscow, Russian Empire
- Occupations: writer, thinker, statesman, prince
- Writing career
- Period: Reign of King Vakhtang VI
- Genres: poem, dictionary
- Notable work: A Book of Wisdom and Lies

Prince Sulkhan-Saba Orbeliani (Georgian: სულხან-საბა ორბელიანი [sulχan saba oɾbeliani]; November 4, 1658 – January 26, 1725), known simply as Sulkhan-Saba, was a Georgian writer and diplomat. Orbeliani is noted in part due to his important role as an emissary of Georgia to France and the Vatican, where he vainly sought assistance on behalf of his beleaguered King Vakhtang VI.

== Biography ==
Orbeliani was born into the House of Orbeliani, with close ties to the Georgian royal Bagrationi dynasty. He was a fabulist, lexicographer, translator, diplomat and scientist. The words of one of the French missioners, Jean Richard, testify to his authority among his contemporaries: "I believe him to be the father of all Georgia."

He was born on 4 November 1658, in the village of Tandzia near Bolnisi in the Kvemo Kartli region. He spent his childhood and adolescence there. He was brought up at the court of King George XI and acquired his encyclopedic knowledge in the Great Palace Library. When he was 20–25 years old he wrote a collection of fables and tales titled Sibrdzne Sitsruisa (A Book of Wisdom and Lies), containing his observations about life. The reader feels how ably, deliberately and naturally the author weaves together his ideas about the lives of both humans and animals. Orbeliani understands both the light and the dark side of human nature and human experience. He describes many aspects of life, answers many questions, and encourages the reader towards greater kindness and compassion.

His next important work was The Georgian Dictionary, which combines both a lexicon and an encyclopedia, one of the first works of its kind in history. His work helped standardize the literary Georgian language. His dictionary for the language is still essential for those who wish to learn Georgian today.

Orbeliani was an educator of Vakhtang VI, King of Kartli, who was the leader of the movement initiated for an intellectual renaissance in Georgia.

In 1709 the first printing-house was established, where for the first time the Gospel and The Knight in the Panther's Skin were printed. During this period the Georgian chronicles were collected, the basis of the Georgian historiography. Orbeliani was in the center of the political and social life of the country together with Vakhtang VI. He was searching for methods of freeing the country from the Osmans. In 1698 Orbeliani became a monk at the Monastery of David Gareji, from thence called Sulkhan-Saba.

Orbeliani appealed to the West for assistance. The growth of his state authority was crowned by his diplomatic missions. He travelled via Constantinople, Marseilles, Paris, Rome, and other cities of Italy and finally back to Georgia through Constantinople and Turkey. In Paris he appeared before Ludwig XIV and in Italy before the Pope Clement XI, who treated him as the Father of all Georgia. The French said of him: "It is happiness that we have had the advantage of seeing the Wisdom of Solomon and divine grace with our own eyes in the person of Your Greatness". France promised assistance to Georgia, but soon Louis XIV died. The ruling circles in France changed and relations with countries of the Near East became aggravated. Concrete historical circumstance made the travel of Orbeliani unsuccessful, his attempts to bring Georgia and the states of Western Europe together turned out to be all in vain.

== Religion ==
Before becoming a monk of David-Garedja Monastery in 1698 under the name Saba, Orbeliani converted to the Roman Catholic Church (1692). He originally practiced his new religion in secret. After 1703 he made spreading the Catholic faith in Georgia a major policy of King Vakhtang VI, who had been his pupil. In 1713–1714 Orbeliani made a journey to the Holy See and to France. He visited Pope Clement XI and King Louis XIV and requested aid from them for King Vakhtang and the Catholic Faith in Kartli (East-Georgian Kingdom). After his return to Kartli Orbeliani actively began trying to spread Catholicism in Georgia, for which the Georgian Orthodox Church persecuted him. In 1724 he fled with King Vakhtang to the Russian Empire.

== Bibliography ==
- Sulkhan-Saba Orbeliani Georgian dictionary (with commentary of I. Abuladse). VI-II, Tbilisi, Merani, 1991/1993
- A. Baramidze, Sulxan-Saba Orbeliani : c'xovreba da literaturli mogvaceoba; nark'vevi. Tbilisi: Sabtschota Saqartvelo 1959 (geo).
- M. Tarchnisvili, J. Assfalg: Geschichte der kirchlichen georgischen Literatur: Auf Grund des ersten Bandes der Georgischen Literaturgeschichte von K. Kekelidze. Biblioteca Apostolica Vaticana, Città del Vaticano 1955 (ger).
- M. Tamarashvili: History of Catholicism among the Georgians. Tbilisi 1902, passim (geo.).
