= Petrus Alphonsi =

Jewish-Spanish physician, writer, astronomer, & polemicist (died c.1116)

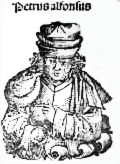
Pedro Alfonso/Petrus Alphonsi in a 15th-century imagined portrait

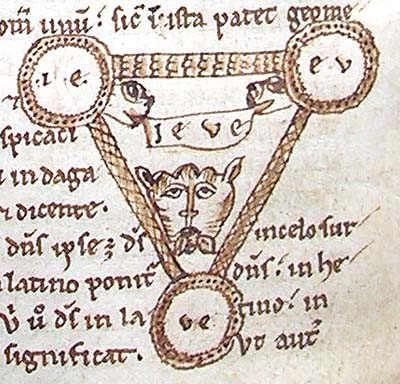
Petrus Alfonsi's Tetragrammaton-Trinity diagram, which influenced Joachim of Fiore and the development of the Shield of the Trinity diagram

Petrus Alphonsi (died after 1116) was a Spanish physician, writer, astronomer and polemicist who was born and raised as a Jew and later in life converted to Christianity in 1106. He is also known just as Alphonsi, and as Peter Alfonsi or Peter Alphonso, and was born Moses Sephardi. Born in Islamic Spain, he mostly lived in England and France after his conversion.

== Life ==
Petrus Alphonsi was born at an unknown date and place in the 11th century in Spain, and educated in al-Andalus, or Islamic Spain. As he described himself, he was baptised at Huesca, capital of the Kingdom of Aragon, on St. Peter's Day, 29 June 1106, when he was probably approaching middle age; this is the first clear date we have in his biography. he took the name of Petrus Alfonsi (Alfonso's Peter).

By 1116 at the latest he had emigrated to England, where he seems to have remained some years, before moving to northern France. The date of his death is as unclear as that of his birth. He was famous as a writer during his lifetime, and remained so for the rest of the Middle Ages, with over 160 surviving medieval manuscripts containing works of his. The most common are his Dialogi contra Iudaeos (Dialogue Against the Jews), an imaginary conversation between a Jew and a Christian, and Disciplina Clericalis (A Training-school for the Clergy), in fact a collection of Eastern fables.

Petrus was born a Jew while living in al-Andalus, and after he rose to prominence, he converted to Christianity. This environment gave him an advantageous knowledge of Christianity, Judaism and Islam that would later prove useful in his polemics. John Tolan mentioned in his book Petrus Alfonsi and His Medieval Readers that "Alfonsi's texts were received enthusiastically—he became an auctor, an authority to be quoted. His success was due in large part to his ability to bridge several cultures: a Jew from the [Muslim] world of al-Andalus." His knowledge of these different religions is what makes Alfonsi unique and why he is essential to be studied when looking at anti-Judaic polemics.

Petrus' upbringing placed him in an atmosphere that provided a significant impetus to launch him as one of the most important figures in anti-Judaic polemics. According to Tolan, Petrus Alfonsi was reared in a society in turmoil: a place of chaos and political instability, where Islam and Christianity were becoming a larger influence. His background was conveniently placed in the centre of contention between religions and circumstances that surrounded his upbringing, and provided the framework for polemics that would shape Medieval Judaic perception.

In the Dialogus Alphonsi relates that he traveled to England as magister in liberal arts. He spent several years there as court physician of Henry I of England (reigned 1100–1135).

The presence of Alfonsi in the West Country in the years before that date may have contributed to the flowering of Arabic science in that region from the 1120s onwards. He discussed astronomy with Walcher of Malvern. Petrus passed on the Arabic system of astronomical graduation. They may have collaborated on a work on eclipses.

== Works ==
=== Disciplina Clericalis ===
Alfonsi's fame rests chiefly on a collection of 33 tales, composed in Latin at the beginning of the 12th century. This work is a collection of oriental tales of moralizing character, translated from Arabic. Some of the tales he drew on were from tales later incorporated into Arabian Nights, including the "Sindibad the Wise" story cycle (not to be confused with Sindbad the Sailor) and "The Tale of Attaf". It established some didactic models that would be followed by other medieval authors.

The collection enjoyed remarkable popularity, and is an interesting study in comparative literature. It is entitled Disciplina Clericalis (A Training-school for the Clergy), and was often used by clergymen in their discourses, notwithstanding the questionable moral tone of some of the stories. The work is important as throwing light on the migration of fables, and is almost indispensable to the student of medieval folk-lore. Translations of it into French, Spanish, German, and English are extant. At the beginning of the 13th century an anonymous versifier rendered some sentences and tales from the Disciplina Clericalis by Petrus Alphonsi (1110 circa) into the elegiac metre. This was the origin of the Alphunsus de Arabicis eventibus. Joseph Jacobs discovered some of the stories at the end of Caxton's translation of the fables of Æsop, where thirteen apologues of "Alfonce" are taken in fact from the Disciplina Clericalis.

An outline of the tales, by Douce, is prefixed to Ellis' "Early English Metrical Romances." Nearly all the stories are adopted in the Gesta Romanorum. Chapters ii and iii were done into Hebrew and issued under the title, Book of Enoch,. An early French translation of this Hebrew language extract was made prior to 1698 by Piques, and August Pichard published another version in Paris, 1838.

Friedrich Wilhelm Valentin Schmidt produced a scholarly edition in 1827.

=== Dialogi contra Iudaeos ===
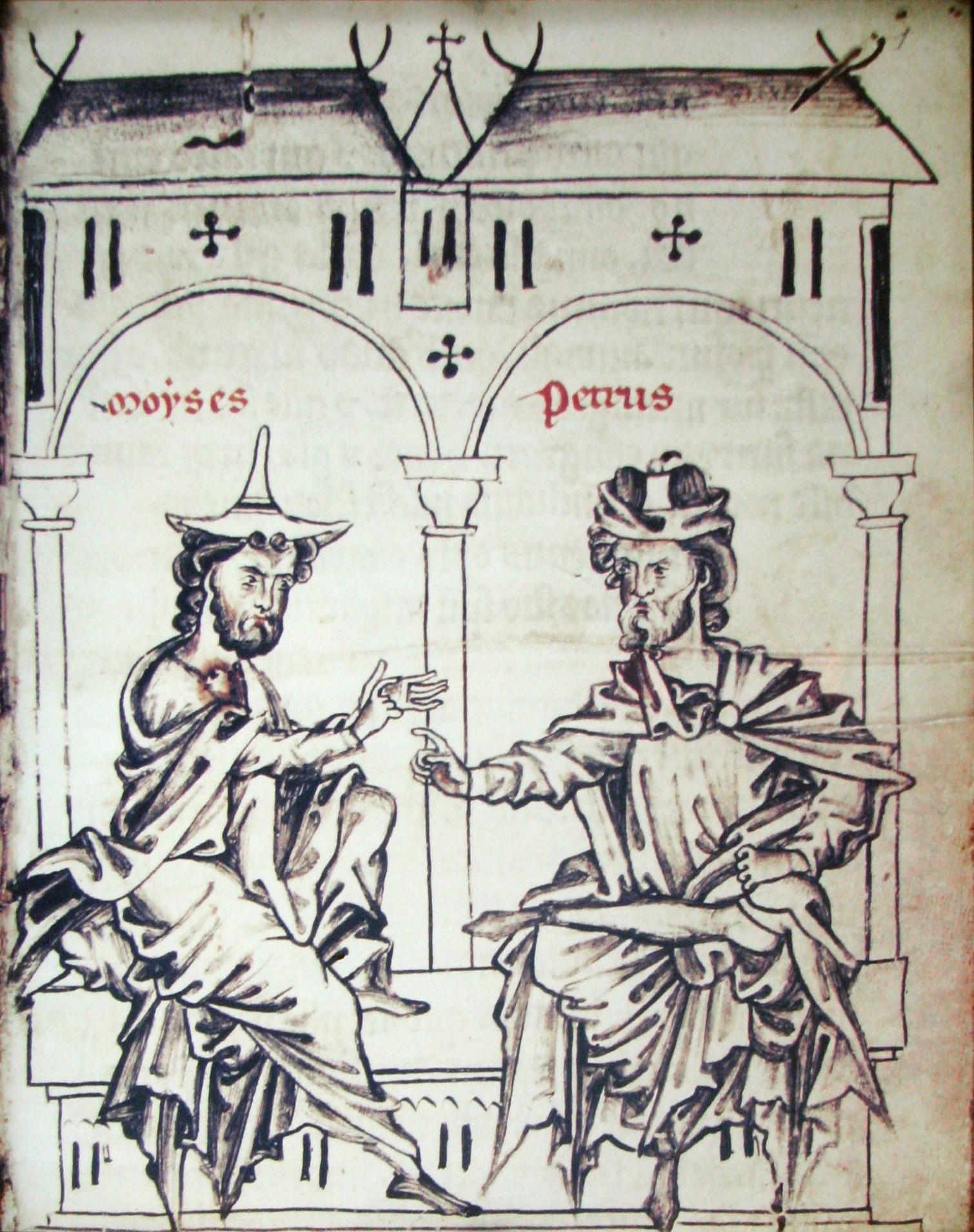
A 13th-century Belgian manuscript showing the dialogue between the Jew "Moyses" and the Christian "Petrus"

Like many converts of his time, Alfonsi was accused of bad faith by the Jewish community and to counter this, as well as to show his zeal for his new faith he wrote a work attacking Judaism and defending Christianity. It became one of the most widely read and used anti-Jewish polemical texts of the Middle Ages, as Tolan shows. Alfonsi wrote the Dialogues in 1110; he presents them as a disputation between his former Jewish self (Moses) and his current Christian self (Peter). He divides the work into twelve "Dialogues" or chapters: and the first four attack Judaism, the fifth attacks Islam, and the last seven defend Christianity.

Up until the Dialogi contra Iudaeos, the Augustinian tradition was followed in Christendom which allowed relative tolerance to the Jewish people, and for the most part up until this point the attacks on the Jewish people were localized and more importantly, not organized. There was no literature before Petrus Alfonsi's Dialogi condemning Judaism as a whole. There was no document for people to latch on to and group up against the Jewish people.

Alfonsi attempted to prove Christianity by disproving Judaism. For Alfonsi, there existed a difficulty in proving Christianity through the invalidity of Judaism since the basic tenets of Christianity originate in the Old Testament. At the time, some believed if a polemicist proves the nullification of binding of the Mosaic ("Old") Law, then ipso facto he or she also proves the invalidity of Christianity. He attempted to avoid this problem by challenging the Talmud and rabbis.

This work presented a point of view contrary to previous Christian philosophy because Christians claimed that the Jews were blindly practicing the Old Law. Petrus Alfonsi initiated a differing idea that “the Jews no longer followed the Old Law; they follow a new and heretical law, that of the Talmud.” Petrus’ belief was that the Jewish leaders were knowingly and willfully leading their flock astray. He believed that they purposely lied in order to conceal their sin of killing Jesus, in spite of the fact that they knew that he was the Son of God. Petrus Alfonsi also claimed that the Talmud was written to keep the Jewish people from seeing that Jesus was the Son of God; he called the Talmud “a fabric of lies” and a “heretical book.”

What makes this doctrine so radically different from some previous Christian polemics of the time is that they tried to prove the validity of Christianity by pointing out scriptures in the Old Law that confirmed that Jesus was the Son of God. With this belief, it portrayed the Jews as a people who would eventually see the truth and would ultimately convert to Christianity. Petrus’ new concept claimed that the Jewish leaders were blatantly lying and had attempted to cover up the truth. This new concept obviously would create a new type of tension between Christians and Jews, and Alfonsi inadvertently affected Anti Semites to rebring [deicide] as a charge against all Jews.

The Augustinian tradition afforded Jews in Europe a tolerance throughout the Latin West that was not shared among other religions. This tradition did not place any emphasis on Judaism being heretical, but rather pointed to the fact that the Jews had a pivotal part to play in the spreading of Christianity. This doctrine was originally written to explain why Jews were not converting to Christianity. Since the Jews were the ones who had kept the law, it would seem logical that they would know whether the savior had come, and this seemed to present a problem within Christian society. Daniel J. Lasker said of Petrus' ideology that “These innovations signaled the beginning of the end of the relative Christian tolerance of Jews and Judaism inspired by the writings of Augustine.” Other authors before Petrus had used harsher rhetoric; there was seldom any deviation from the Augustinian tradition.

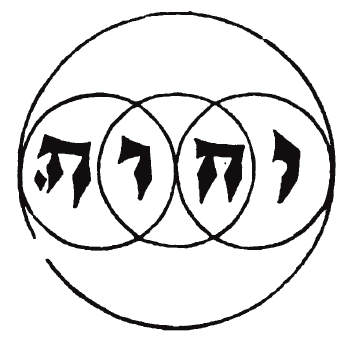
Alphonsi "was probably the first to connect the 'ineffable' trinity with the 'ineffable' Tetragram".

The Augustinian tradition assumed that, once the Jews’ purpose was served, they would convert to Christianity, but Jews in general were not converting and people were looking for a new explanation. Alfonsi attempted to explain this discrepancy by claiming that Judaism is heretical, and that the Jewish leaders have knowingly covered up the truth. He made his claim specific to the religion and Jewish leaders, but not to the people as a whole.

Alfonsi's polemical work did not signify that the twelfth century was filled with violence between religions, or that many who professed to be Christians were actively crusading against the Jews for conversion. At this time, the Augustinian tradition remained and Christians assumed that the Jews would just progress towards becoming Christians. During Alfonsi's life, his work set the stage and afforded the language that would enable later persecutions, rather than his polemics developing out of Jewish persecution. Although Alfonsi may not have been the man who was forcibly converting Jews, his writings did enable later polemicist to fabricate even bolder claims of the Talmud including that it was satanic. These new writings and ideals influenced the thought of many others in the Latin West for years to come.

Petrus Alfonsi's Dialogi contra Iudaeos was not an entirely new polemical concept; he used the same arguments and cited the same Old Testament prophecies that polemicists before him had been using. Before Alfonsi's Dialogi contra Iudaeos, Medieval Latin knew very little about the religious beliefs and practices of the Jews living within their own city. Most Christians did not know the contents of the Talmud, and some did not even know of its existence. This lack of knowledge provided a problem for Christians who were trying to prove the superiority of Christianity over Judaism, and they were doing this without even knowing the basics of Judaism.

What made Petrus Alfonsi's work unique and gave him a level of influence that was unmatched by any of the preceding polemicists was his knowledge of Judaism combined with his new concept on how to perceive it. As stated earlier, Petrus’ unique upbringing gave him a particular advantage to be an authority on polemics. Because Petrus came from Iberia, a place where polemics were initiated from actual dialogue and actual knowledge of rival religions, he was able to bring his Andalusian polemic with his firsthand knowledge of Judaism out of Iberia to Latin Europe, and transform the Latin polemical tradition.

The Dialogi contra Iudaeos represented a turning point in not only polemical strategy, but also the perception of Judaism. In the Dialogi, Alfonsi argued with himself as his old Jewish self (Moses) and his new converted Christian self (Peter). What made this particular strategy of polemics so influential was the ability to control the argument legitimately without the need of a second party. Since the argument was between Judaism and Christianity, and Alfonsi was once a Jew and then a Christian, he was able to argue both sides with accuracy. By arguing against himself in the Dialogi, he was able to set the parameters of the argument without any unforeseen issues from a second party. Petrus was able to make each side say what he wanted; because of this, it was authoritative, and became a damaging piece to the perception of the Jews.

The polemics between Moses and Peter seemed to have a friendly tone in their voices, but the arguments that the Dialogi presented were a radically new way to attack Judaism. It was far more negative than any of the Latin works influenced by the Augustinian tradition. Alfonsi viewed Judaism as a conspiratorial, anti-Christian sect. Although he claimed that Judaism did follow the Old Law, he said that it is “only in part, and that part is not pleasing to God.” He also challenged the general idea that the Jews unknowingly killed the son of God, and said that they killed Jesus out of envy. He said that, “God revealed to their priests the Temple would be destroyed and the Jews scattered as punishment for the Crucifixion; the priests, out of malice and envy, hid this revelation from their people.”

This was a clear deviation from the Augustinian tradition, and was only successful because of the unique position as a Jewish convert that Petrus Alfonsi occupied. Because of his knowledge of the Talmud and Judaism, that until then was unprecedented by Christian polemicists, it validated his anti-Judaic position. This knowledge made him an authority, and allowed some people to begin to question the longstanding Augustinian tradition of tolerance, which was problematic for the Jews on many different levels. This not only became a threat to Jewish communities in creating new contentions between Jews and Christians that had not previously existed, but also Jews had to worry about the possibility of losing their position of tolerance with Christendom. With these new polemical works came the issue of what was the purpose of the Jew. If the Jews’ position no longer fell in line with acceptance within Christendom, then they would be forced into a new role, that of intolerance.

==== Various Arguments of the Dialogi contra Iudaeos ====
Alfonsi's claim that was the most deleterious to Jewish-Christian relations was that the Jews knew that Christ was the Son of God and still killed him. John Tolan says that “Alfonsi was the first Latin writer of anti-Jewish polemic to assert that the Jews were guilty of deicide .” In the tenth titulus of the Dialogi contra Iudaeos, Alfonsi declares “that Christ was crucified and killed by the Jews of their own spontaneous will.” He claimed that the Jewish leaders were a deceitful people that should not be trusted, and since he used to be a Jew whom followed Rabbinical Judaism, he was qualified to reveal their thinking process.

When the Jews were accused of killing the Son of God, there were three responses given in an attempt to justify why this action was done. The first response was that the Crucifixion was necessary, according to Moses, for it “fulfilled his will.” The second point that Moses makes is that many of the Jews’ ancestors were not a part of the Crucifixion and were already living elsewhere in the world; Judah killed Christ, not Israel. The last point Moses makes is that the Jews had a right to kill him because they had a just judgment of Jesus being a magician. Peter retaliates with valid counterpoints that are clearly better constructed than Moses’ points. This is not to say that Moses’ arguments were not well thought out; it is merely that Peter puts together a better articulated argument. Once Moses conceded that Peter was making valid points, he questioned then why the Jews would kill Jesus, because there were many Jews that were known for their wisdom. Peter then says that “since they denied him and slew him from envy, this is why they are guilty of such a great crime". He said they decided to kill Christ “not in order to fulfill his will, but from the poison of hatred and envy.” Previous polemicists have claimed that the exile of the Jews was due to the Crucifixion, but what was new was the idea that at least a small number of rabbis knew that Jesus was the Son of God before they killed him and that the rabbis also knew this was the reason they were in exile.

Petrus’ attack, although directed at Judaism, does not attempt to challenge the Jewish people; he reserves his polemics for the rabbis and rabbinical Jewish writings. This is particularly interesting because his polemics demonstrate that the Jewish people were not impenitently heretical but rather misguided by envious rabbis who wanted to retain power over the Jews. If this was the case, then there was hope for the Christians that the Jews could convert.

This perception of the Jews being capable of conversion if they were just enlightened of the truth about the deceitful rabbis was not injurious to the Jews in the immediate future, but rather to Judaism as a whole over a long period of time. These concepts that flipped the Augustinian tradition upside-down laid the groundwork and afforded the language that would enable Christians to persecute the Jews for the purpose of conversion. According to Christians, once the Jews had discovered the truth that Alfonsi had, they would convert because the truth was self-evident. However, this was not the case and it gave Christians and later polemicist the impetus for developing a culture that would require a new position for the Jews.

When Alfonsi used the Talmud in his arguments, his goal was to expose it as “devoid of divine inspiration” and he did this through proving the Talmud was “contrary to logical and scientific fact.” The way that Alfonsi used the Talmud was completely different from how Christians in the past had used it. Previously Christians would merely peruse the Talmud for inflammatory references to Jesus in order to invoke Christian disdain towards the Jews. When Petrus Alfonsi quoted from the Talmud, he ignored any such slanderous language, and focused on references that would contradict philosophical logic or scientific fact. He proved philosophical fact in his polemics by discussing how the corporeality of God could not exist because it contradicted the dominant Aristotelian theory, and that the Talmudic rabbis saw such scriptures as “God created man in his own image,” as literal. In the Dialogi contra Iudaeos Petrus attacked the mystical tradition called Shi’ur Qomah. He showed how science of his day clearly contradicted the Talmudic claim in hopes of discrediting the validity of it being divinely inspired.

==== The Fifth Titulus ====
As stated earlier, what made Alfonsi's polemics unique is that he was born a Jew in al-Andalus and converted to Christianity. He not only had an immense knowledge of Christianity and Judaism, but he was also very well versed in Islam. He was the first Christian polemicist to have a well-rounded knowledge of the Islamic faith. Some Iberian scholars like Daniel Blackman have made ground breaking arguments that Alfonsi's polemical work against Islam was not primarily meant to disprove it, but rather to use Islam as a means for disproving Judaism to Christians through association. This is not a claim that Alfonsi's only goal in his Islamic polemics was to oppose Judaism, but rather that it was a strong underlining goal.

Petrus established in the beginning of the fifth titulus that he was very knowledgeable in Islam, and it is evident that he wanted his readers to know that he had the authority to write about Islam. Since there was no real polemics about Islam at this time, it was important to make it known to his readers that he had the authority to write about Islam. To accomplish this, Petrus so arrogantly says that he “is not less convincing than if Mohammad himself were present...” This confidence in his knowledge of the Islamic faith allows the opportunity for the Dialogi to make a difference in the perception of Christians in Latin Europe.

The fifth titulus in the Dialogi contra Iudaeos dealt specifically with polemics against Islam, and out of all twelve tituli, the fifth titulus was the only one that mentioned anything of Islam. Tolan argued that the fifth titulus was shorter and less developed than the other anti-Judaic tituli because he was just trying to convince a Jew of the invalidity of Islam; so there was no need to fully develop this titulus. Blackman argues differently about the fifth titulus, that it was written to associate Judaism with Islam. The fact that Petrus associated Moses with defending the Islamic faith makes this an argument against Judaism. Petrus does not directly say that this is his reason, but the Dialogi was written for Christians to read, not Jews. This document was one of the most important polemics written for Christians’ perception of Judaism. The Dialogi portrayed Judaism as defending Islam, so if Petrus could show Islam as invalid, then he could, through association, expose the invalidity of Judaism.

Although Blackman believes that Petrus was motivated in part to write the Dialogi to help explain to Christians why Islam is false, if he really wanted to articulate a complete argument against Islam, he could have written a separate work that was against a Muslim and not a Jew. It seems very illogical for Petrus to write such an extensive work against Judaism, and then write one of the twelve titulus about Islam in the middle of the Dialogi. If the purpose of the fifth titulus is to be against Islam, it does not coincide with anything else in the Dialogi, and it is placed in the middle of it. If Petrus’ true intention of the fifth titulus was to prove the invalidity of Islam then he most certainly would have written an entirely different polemic and included the fifth titulus in that work.

When one contrasts Alfonsi's Judaic polemics to his Islamic polemics, there is much revealed about his thoughts on each religion. Petrus’ polemics against Judaism did not focus on how the religion was created or the people that were the original followers of the religion, but that is exactly how Alfonsi sought to defame Islam. He would use a different method of attack against Judaism by associating Judaism with Islam to the Christians.

In the start of the fifth titulus, Moses conceded that Peter did not agree with Judaism, but then made the insinuation that Islam is a just religion, and that it is preferred over Christianity. Moses says that “Indeed [their] law is generous. It contains many commands concerning the pleasures of this present life, by which fact divine love is shown to have been greatest toward them... If you should investigate the basis of this law, you will find that it is grounded on an unshakable foundation of reason.” What Petrus attempted to do here is have Moses defend Islam. This was particularly important because he wanted a strong association in his readers’ minds between Judaism and Islam. His goal was to create a link in the minds of his readers so that they perceived Judaism and Islam to be synergistically working together against Christianity.

Alfonsi never directly made this claim, but rather wanted his readers to think that Christianity was correct, and that opposing religions would work together before ever conceding that Christianity was the valid choice. He wanted the readers to believe that Judaism is interested only in disproving Christianity and would even defend Islam if necessary. This was an effective method because the readers of the Dialogi were Christians, and they would assume that, since Christianity was correct, all other “false” religions would work together for the downfall of Christianity.

By equating Judaism with Islam, Alfonsi helped strengthen his argument that Judaism is heretical. As stated earlier, Judaism had enjoyed the benefit of the Augustinian tradition, but by placing Judaism on the same level as Islam, it made Judaism as heretical as Islam.

This association of Judaism with Islam may not have been as directly condemning as Alfonsi's claims that Judaism was heretical, but this does in fact damage the perception of Judaism. Alfonsi's purpose was to degrade the character of the Arabs and the origins of the Islamic faith to order to dismiss it as invalid. Petrus said of the Arabs that “the greater portion of the Arabs at that time were common soldiers and farmers, and almost all were idolaters, except for some who embraced the law of Moses in a heretical way...” He also said of Muhammad that, “Once he was transformed from the humblest pauper into a very rich man by this wealth, he burst forth into such arrogance that he expected that the kingdom of the Arabs would be offered to him...” This insinuation of the Arab people being idolaters and Muhammad being an arrogant man due to his wealth was meant to debunk the Islamic faith. Petrus was able to come out against Islam in a different way than Judaism because Christianity in no way bases its faith on Islam, so going after its history was the simplest task to accomplish. This was to show the Christian readers that there was no reason to defend Islam, and that anyone who did defend it must be doing so only to attempt to dismantle the validity of Christianity.

Although it is not possible to prove with empirical evidence, Blackman believes that Petrus Alfonsi converted to Christianity because he honestly believed that it was right and the most logical choice to make. His surroundings suggested that his conversion was merely the product of opportunism and chaos, but when one begins to delve into the Dialogi contra Iudaeos it becomes apparent that he deeply believed what he wrote. Funkenstein agrees saying that he believes that Petrus’ motives for the writing of the Dialogi were fairly sincere. It is my belief that Petrus supposed that all Jews simply needed to see the truth and that the rabbis were lying out of envy to keep the populace subordinated. He saw himself in the Jews, and as long as they were being led by deceitful rabbis, they had no reason to convert. It was this ubiquitous ideal that was his greatest weakness when writing the Dialogi. Although this document was written for Christians, he intended it to help the Christians understand why the Jewish people were not converting. According to Alfonsi, as long as the rabbis of the present day remained in power, they were able to keep the Jewish people from seeing the truth. Alfonsi's Dialogi was the single most important work in polemics for shifting the perspective of the Christians, and he assumed that his work would be able to convert the Jews. This was not the case. Although he was successful in changing the mindsets of the Christians toward the Jews, there was not the desired result of conversion but rather something he was against, a greater persecution of the Jews.

A manuscript from the 12th century containing the work can be found at the Cambridge Historic Parker Library.

=== Other works ===
- De dracone, in which he calculates movements of the stars
- De Astronomia, contains an astronomical grid according to the Arab, Persian and Latin calendars. With them and the aid of an astrolabe it was possible to find out, with accuracy, the ascending positions of the sun, moon, and the five known planets.
- Carta a los peripatéticos franceses

== See also ==
- Jacob ben Reuben (rabbi)
