= Syntipas =

Legendary Indian author of a collection medieval tales

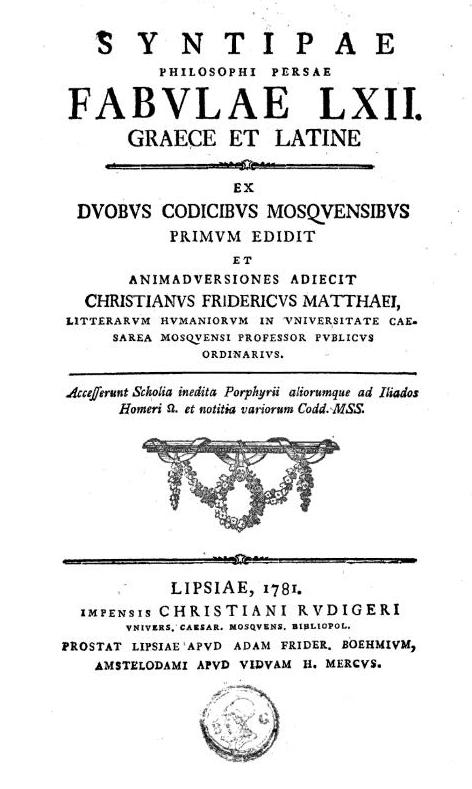
Title page of the Latin edition of The Fables of Syntipas, 1781

Syntipas (Note: Greek: Συντίπας; also rendered as Sindibad (Arabic: سندباد), Sandbad (Persian: سندباد), Sendabar (Hebrew: סנדבר), Çendubete (Spanish) and Siddhapati (Sanskrit: सिद्धपति).) is the purported author of the Seven Wise Masters, a cycle of stories of Indian and Persian origin popular in medieval literature. He first appears in Arabic renditions as an Indian philosopher who lived around 100 BC.

Due to the popularity of Seven Wise Masters, he was also credited with a collection of Greek-derived fables in medieval times.

== Origins and development ==
The framework story (story within a story) in which Syntipas plays a leading part accompanies the immensely popular cluster of tales, reminiscent of the 1001 Nights, known generally in Europe as the History of the Seven Wise Masters (Historia Septem Sapientium) or Dolopathos. It is conjectured to have been of Indian or Persian origin and was eventually transmitted into many Oriental and Western languages. A Syriac version was translated into Greek by the Byzantine author Michael Andreopoulos at the end of the 11th century under the title of The Book of the Philosopher Syntipas. In his introduction, Andreopoulos describes it as a story which “derides evildoers and, towards its end, praises righteous deeds,” thus excusing a work otherwise characterised by “exoticism and eroticism”. Another version was translated from Arabic into Spanish in the thirteenth century as The Book of the Wiles of Women (Spanish: El Libro de los Enganos e los Asayamientos de las Mugeres).

In the Greek version, Syntipas is counsellor to King Cyrus and tutor to his son who, having taken a vow of silence for seven days, is accused by his stepmother of trying to seduce her. Over successive days there follows a competition of stories and counter-stories told by the king’s advisory philosophers and the stepmother whose advances he has rejected, thus putting off the prince’s execution until he is at liberty to tell the truth. This denouement is followed by a few other tales illustrative of the situation.

Although a few of the 27 stories that appear there concern animals, the main protagonists of the majority are humans. This proportion was reversed in The Fables of Syntipas, a Syriac fable collection also translated by Andreopoulos which accompanied the Syntipas romance in some manuscripts. A Latin version of these was published in 1781 by Christian Frederick Matthaei, drawing the attention of scholars interested in the transmission of Aesop’s Fables. Eventually it was demonstrated that most had been translated into Syriac from an old Greek source as recently as the 9th century or later. Nearly a quarter of the 62 appearing there are not Aesopic, but otherwise it includes such well known examples as The Ant and the Grasshopper, The North Wind and the Sun and The Farmer and the Viper.

== Bibliography ==
- Adrados, Francisco Rodríguez: History of the Graeco-Latin Fable Vol.1, Brill NL 1999, pp.132-5
- Gibbs, Laura: “Syntipas” in Aesopus, 2009
- Perry, Ben Edward: ”The origin and date of the fables ascribed to Syntipas” in Transactions and Proceedings of the American Philological Association Vol. 64 (1933), pp.xliv-xlv
- Toth, Ida: “Authorship and authority in The Book of the Philosopher Syntipas”, in The Author in Middle Byzantine Literature, Walter de Gruyter 2014, pp.87-102
