= Jon Paul Piques =

Canadian actor, director, Internet celebrity and soccer player

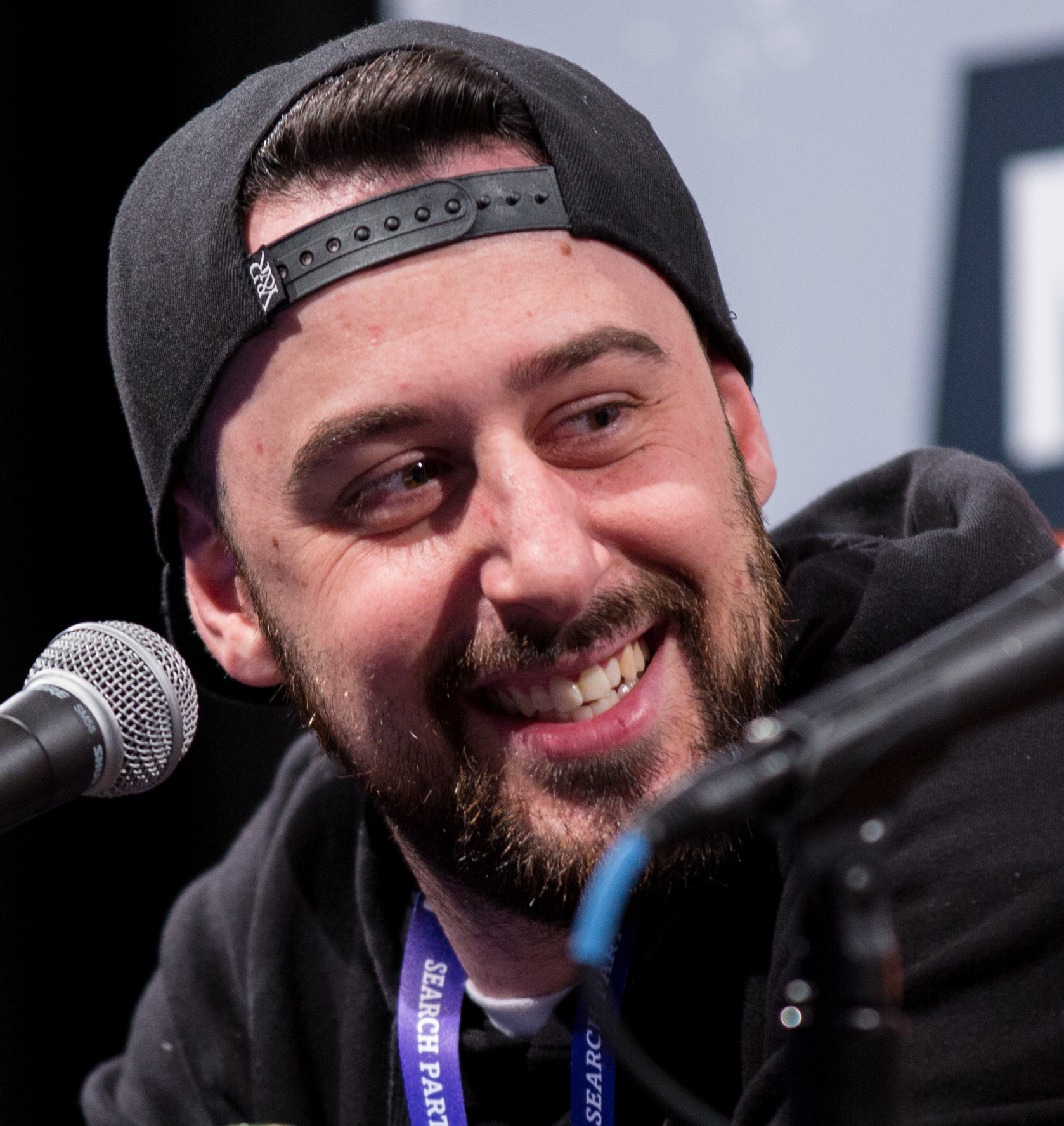
- Piques in 2016
- Born: June 30, 1986 (age 40); Woodbridge, Ontario, Canada
- Education: Humber College
- Occupations: Footballer; actor; director; internet celebrity
- Years active: 2004–present
- Known for: Facebook and Instagram skits
Association football career
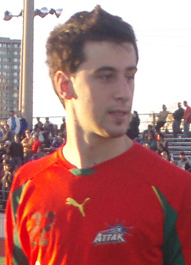
- Piques in 2007
- Position: Goalkeeper
Youth career
- Sporting CP
- Beja
Senior career*
Years	Team	Apps	(Gls)
2006	Braga B		
2006	Toronto Lynx		
2007	Montreal Impact		
2007	Trois-Rivières Attak		
2008–2009	Italia Shooters		
- * Club domestic league appearances and goals

Jon Paul Piques (born June 30, 1986), also known simply as Piques, is a Canadian actor, director, internet celebrity and former soccer player. He has over 12 billion views on YouTube and over 11 million combined followers.

== Career ==
=== Soccer career ===
Piques played as a goalkeeper during his youth and was scouted by Sporting CP through his father's contacts at the Lisbon club. Sporting's officials wanted him to stay, but he was unable to as he was still in ninth grade. He finished up his school year and joined Sporting's academy. During his time there, he became close friends with Miguel Veloso, and although they never played together, Cristiano Ronaldo. Piques was at Sporting for ten months, and FIFA rules determined that he had to return to Canada. He went back to Portugal after turning eighteen, to play for Beja and then for Braga's reserve team, before returning to Canada to play one season with the Montreal Impact. At Braga B, he was second-choice to Eduardo and was a teammate of Diego Costa, both of whom would later play for Chelsea, Piques' favourite club.

In 2007, he played with Montreal's reserve team Trois-Rivières Attak in the Canadian Soccer League, where he won the Open Canada Cup. The following season, he played with division rivals the Italia Shooters, where he won the International Division title.

=== Media career ===
Piques decided to change career paths and attended Humber College, majoring in marketing and sales. After college, Piques worked as a business insurance salesman, but later moved to Los Angeles following initial success on social media. Piques' breakthrough on social media was through Vine, where he posted comedic videos on his way back and forth to his insurance job. Following his success on Vine, Piques expanded into Facebook. Many of Piques’ social media videos involve collaborations with other Vine stars such as Jerry Purpdrank, Amanda Cerny, Lele Pons, Max Jr and King Bach.

Piques was a featured speaker in the 2016 SXSW festival in Austin, Texas, where he led the panel about the rise of social media in today's world.

Piques shot his first pilot presentation in May 2016, which he wrote and is starring in for Playboy Digital. In 2018, Piques had a voice role in a six-part animated series Super Slackers, directed by Simpsons director David Silverman. In 2019, he appeared in Airplane Mode, a film featuring several internet celebrities and co-written by the Paul brothers.

Some of the brands Piques has worked with include T-Mobile, Anheuser-Busch and TGI Fridays among others.

== Personal life ==
Piques was raised in Woodbridge, Ontario, Canada. He is of Italian and Portuguese descent.
