= Disciplina clericalis =

Book by Petrus Alphonsi

Disciplina clericalis is a book by Petrus Alphonsi. Written in Latin at the beginning of the 12th century, it is a collection of 33 fables and tales and has been described as "the oldest European collection of novellas". It has also been classified as a frame tale.

== Works in Disciplina Clericalis ==
Works included in the book are:

=== The Half Friend ===
A Berber who is dying calls his son to him and asks him how many friends he thinks he has gained in his lifetime. The son estimates the number to be around 100. The father replies that as for himself, he has only ever acquired half a friend, and that he only considers people his friends once they have proved their friendship. He then tells his son to test his friends by bringing them a dead calf cut in pieces in a sack and bring it to each of his friends telling them that he has killed a man and he needs them to help him hide the body. All of his friends refuse to help him and break off their friendships with him. The father then tells the son to go to his "half friend" and see what he will say. The son does this and the "half friend" agrees and begins preparations. Upon seeing this, son informs the "half friend" of the truth and thanks him. Afterward the son asks the father if he has ever known someone who had a "perfect friend". The father replies that he has and begins to tell the story.

=== The Perfect Friend ===
The story opens with two merchants, one living in Marrakesh and the other in Egypt, who know each other through hearsay. One day, the one from Marrakesh happens to have business in Egypt and travels there. He is welcomed to stay at the house of the other merchant but suddenly falls ill. The other merchant, who is hosting him, calls in the most experienced doctors in Egypt who diagnose him with lovesickness. Upon request, his host brings him all the women of his household, starting with the chamber maids and singing girls and then his daughters, to see if they are the object of his sickness. When none of these are of interest to the sick merchant, his host brings him a girl of noble birth who he is hoping to marry someday. When the sick merchant sees this girl he tells his host that 'she is the one who means life and death to me'. Upon hearing this the host gives the girl to the sick merchant who recovers and after finishing his business goes back to Marrakesh.

Some time later the merchant from Egypt loses all his wealth and becomes a beggar. He travels to Marrakesh to see his friend, however he arrives at an inconvenient time in the middle of the night. He does not go to his friends house for fear of being recognized and instead decides to spend the night in a mosque. While he is there he overhears one man kill another. There is an alarm and the citizens flock to the mosque. They find the Egyptian who confesses to the crime so that he can commit suicide. The following morning he brought to the gallows and is about to be hanged when the other merchant sees him and confesses to the crime to save his friends life. The real murderer sees this and decides to confess to the crime so that he can escape a worse judgement from God later on. The judges are confused by this and decide to take the case before the king. After having a council they decide to set all three men at liberty if they will tell how the event came to pass. They do and are set at liberty. After this the merchant from Marrakesh lets the other merchant into his house as a guest and offers to allow him to stay and share his wealth. However the merchant from Egypt wants to go back to his homeland and so the merchant from Marrakesh give him half of his goods and he returns to his own land. On hearing this, the son of the dying remarks 'it is scarcely likely that a man could find such a friend'.

=== The Three Poets ===
Three different poets go to present poetry to a king. The first is a Berber of lowly birth and high abilities. The king rewards him richly when he hears his poetry. When other poets malign him for being of lowly birth the king rewards him even more when he tells the maligners 'no one blames the rose because it springs from amongst thorny thickets'. The second poet who comes before the king is of noble birth but lesser abilities. When the king hears his poetry he does not give him a gift. The poet then asks for a gift for being noble. On hearing this the king asks the poet who his father is. Upon discovering the identity of the poets father the king tells the poet 'his seed has degenerated in you'. The third poet who appears before the king has a noble mother but a lesser father and is not of great abilities. When the king hears this poet he again asks who the father is. The poet is ashamed to mention his father and so speaks to the king of his uncle who possesses great skill and wit. Upon observing this the king roars with laughter. When he is asked why he begins to tell a story.

=== The Mule and the Fox ===
The king tells his courtiers he is laughing because the situation reminds him of a story he read in a book of fables. At their request he tells the story: A young mule and a fox are in a pasture together. The fox is intrigued by the mule and asks who he is. The mule replies that he is one of gods creatures. The fox then asks the mule if he has a mother and a father. The mule, unwilling to admit that his father is a donkey says, 'my mother's brother is a noble steed'. After telling this story, the king compares the third poet to the mule who was ashamed of his father because he was a donkey and asks the poet who his father is. When the king sees the poet's father he recognizes him as being a lowly and uneducated man. On seeing this the king says of this poet 'give him something from our treasury, for the seed has not degenerated in him'.

=== The Man and the Serpent ===
A man walking through a field finds a snake which has been tied up by shepherds. The man frees the snake and brings it back to life by warming it. As soon as the snake comes back to life it attacks the man by winding itself around him. When the man asks him why he is repaying the good that has been done him with evil the snake replies that it is his nature. The man argues with the snake and a fox is called upon to judge the matter. The fox first has the snake tied back up and tells it to escape if it can. The fox then tells the man that he cannot change the natural order of things using an analogy of a weight that falls when its supports are removed.

=== The Hunchback and the Poet ===
A poet presents a pleasing poem before the king and is rewarded with a gift of his choosing. He asks the king if he may be permitted to sit at the gate and to ask one dinar from every person with a deformity (hunchbacked, one-eyed, leprous, etc.). One day a hunchback comes by wearing a hooded cloak and holding a staff. The poet asks him for a dinar and he refuses at which point the poet rips off his hood revealing that he has only one eye. The poet, still holding onto the man's hood, asks for two dinars. The man tries to run and his hood is ripped off revealing a rash and he is asked for three dinars. The hunchback tries to resist by force and thus reveals his arms and it becomes apparent that he has impetigo. He is asked for a fourth dinar. During the struggle his cloak is also torn revealing that he has a hernia. This causes the poet to solicit a fifth dinar from him. The moral of the story is that as a result of the hunchbacks struggling he is required to pay five dinars when he could have only paid one.

=== The Two Clerks who Entered a Tavern ===
Two learned men are out on a walk and approach a gathering area of drinkers. The first argues that they ought to divert their course away from the area to avoid becoming involved with evil men. The other does not agree saying that it cannot hurt to pass through, and they do not alter their course. While they are passing the second man is overpowered by a song which he hears and is held back. His companion leaves him and he decides to enter a tavern to drink. Meanwhile, a prefect of the city follows a spy into the tavern. This prefect realizes that the tavern is the abode of the spy and arrests all of the men inside of the tavern for being accomplices.

=== The Voice of the Screech Owl ===
Two students are walking along and come to a place where they hear a beautiful voice belonging to a woman. One of them stops to listen and is urged to continue by his friend who says "Whoever hears the song of the bird and is bewitched thereby, he must surely die". The first student remarks that the voice which they had heard was more beautiful than the one he heard with his teacher earlier. He then goes on to tell his friend about the voice which he had heard earlier. This voice was repetitive and discordant and the student marvels that his teacher found pleasure in it. The teacher remarks that man finds joy in his voice, poetry, and son even if they are not pleasing to him. Then the two students depart.

=== The Vintner ===
A vintner goes out in his field and while he is gone his wife calls her lover to her. However her husband returns unexpectedly because of an injury to his eye. The wife hides her lover under the bed and goes to meet her husband. When he asks to have his bed prepared the wife, worried that he will discover her lover, asks what is ailing him. He tells her of the injury to his eye and she tells him that she must lay a charm on the good eye so that the same thing will not befall it as well. He agrees to this and the wife kisses his eye until her lover is safely out of the house.

=== The Linen Sheet ===
A man goes travelling and leaves his wife with his mother-in-law. His wife loves another and tells her mother who approves. While they are eating with this lover, the husband returns unexpectedly. The wife hides her lover and lets her husband in. He asks to have his bed prepared. The wife is unsure how to handle this request so the mother steps in and distracts the man with a fine linen sheet and the lover sneaks out of the house.

=== The Sword ===
A man goes travelling and leaves his wife with his mother-in-law. The mother in law approves of the wife's secret lover and invites him to a banquet. While they are eating the husband returns and knocks on the door. Having no place to hide the lover, the mother-in-law gives him a sword and tells him to stand by the door. When the husband asks the meaning of this the mother-in-law replies that the man was running from three men who were trying to kill him and that they had given him refuge. She further informs the husband that the lover had thought the husband was one of these pursuers and for this reason had not addressed him. The husband is impressed by this and makes the man eat with him and comforts him before letting him go.

=== The Hermit who Prepared his Soul for Death ===
The Book also contains a prologue and an epilogue
