= Seven Wise Masters =

Cycle of stories of Sanskrit, Persian or Hebrew origins

The Seven Wise Masters (also called the Seven Sages or Seven Wise Men) is a frame narrative with multiple embedded stories, known across Europe, Asia, the Middle East and North Africa from the ninth century onwards. It is one of the most widely transmitted tales of premodernity, translated and adapted into at least 32 languages, with each version considerably different from the others.

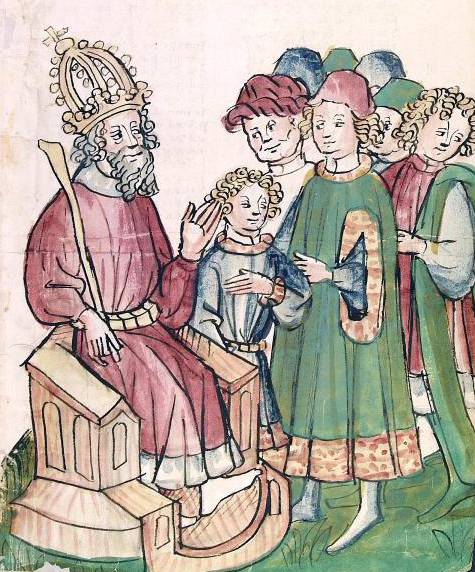
Emperor Pontianus, his son Diocletian and the seven wise masters (Cod pal. germ 149 at Heidelberg)

== Plot ==
A king or emperor sends his son, the young prince, to be educated away from the court by seven wise masters. On his return to court, the prince is bound to a week's silence to avert danger foreseen in his horoscope. His stepmother attempts to seduce him but is rejected. The woman accuses the son of attempted rape and seeks to bring about his death. The seven sages each tell a story in his defence, and in many versions the woman reciprocates with her own stories. Finally the prince's lips are unsealed, the truth exposed, and the wicked woman is either pardoned or executed.

== Transmission ==
The transmission of the narrative falls into two main branches: the older branch consists of versions often referred to collectively as the Book of Sindbad, contains a distinctive series of embedded tales. The plot is usually set at a royal court whose king has several wives or sexual partners, and whose most prominent sage is known as Sindbad, Sindibad, Sendebar, Syntipas or similar. The younger branch is usually known as the Seven Sages of Rome, Dolopathos or Diocletian and contains its own relatively consistent series of embedded tales. It is normally set at the court of the Emperor of Rome, who remarries after the death of his son's mother.

== The Book of Sindbad ==
The earliest existing version of the Book of Sindbad that can be relatively secured dated is the Greek Book of Syntipas the Philosopher, composed by Michael Andreopoulos in Anatolia in the late eleventh century. Andreopoulos plausibly claims to have worked from a Syriac translation, which was itself based on an Arabic translation by one Musa, of a Persian text. All these older texts are lost, but there are surviving versions from the twelfth century onwards in Syriac, Arabic, Persian, Greek, Hebrew, and Spanish. No traces of a Sanskrit version have been found.

=== Syriac: Sindban ===
The Syriac Sindban is one of the oldest extant versions of the narrative.

=== Greek: Syntipas ===
The Byzantine version of the text.

=== Persian: Sindibad-nameh ===
There are three versions in Persian, including one in verse, and two in prose, dating from the late twelfth century to the late fourteenth century. One of the prose texts, by Nakhshabi, is the eighth night in his Tutinama story-cycle.

=== Arabic: The Book of the Seven Vizirs ===
While the surviving versions of the Seven Vizirs are dated later than many of the other texts in the Eastern tradition, earlier versions are presumed to have existed.

The version of the Sindbad narrative titled Kitāb al-Sindbād, or الوزراء السبعة [Al-Wuzarāʾ al-sabʿa, The Seven Viziers] is referenced in Arabic literature dating from the 9th and 10th centuries. Though no early versions of the full text survive, allusions to the narrative may be found in the works of the historian such as al-Ya'qūbī (9th century) and al-Shābushtī (d. after 998 CE / late 4th century AH), suggesting that the narrative was well known by the 10th century, with the original Arabic transmission date by the 9th, or possibly even 8th century. Additional references to the narrative are found in Murūj al-Dhahab by al-Masʿūdī’ (d. 956 CE / 345 AH), who claims the popular entertainment book Kitāb al-Sindbād refers to the sage Sindbād who lived during the reign of the Indian king Kush and relates the story of the Seven Viziers, the Prince, and the King's wife; it is also mentioned in al-Fihrist by Ibn al-Nadīm (d. 995 CE / 385 AH), in which Kitāb Sindbād al-Ḥakīm is referenced as a book of entertainment that exists in two forms - long and short - and has either Persian or Indian origins (see Ateş 1948, pp. 12–13). Ibn al-Nadīm identifies the Arabic poet Abān al-Lāhiqī as the author of one version, and also 'transmits the name of the Persian scholar Mūsā b. 'Īsā al-Kisrawī (d. 874/875 CE), one of the leading translators from Persian into Arabic, who has been unanimously identified in modern scholarship as Mousos from Andreopoulos's Preface' in the Greek version (Krönung 2016, p. 370).

The surviving copies of the text in Arabic are much younger than this, however, and they fall into three distinct versions or redactions:

- A1001: The version of The Seven Viziers found in the One Thousand and One Nights
- A101: The version of The Seven Viziers embedded in the One Hundred and One Nights
- Arabic Version A: The Seven Viziers redacted independently of a larger frame structure.

There is some variation within each of the above groups. The independent Seven Viziers redactions, discussed below, demonstrate some variation in the number and order of stories contained within them. For example, the earliest surviving independent Seven Viziers text - c. 1535, edited by Ateş in the appendix to his edition of Sindbad-name, found in the Ali Paşa Library in Istanbul - contains the 21 stories. Other later versions from the 18th century, including Bibliothèque nationale de France, Arabe 3670 and Paris Bibliothèque nationale de France, Arabe 3639 edited by Basset in 1903, include 24 stories instead. Notably, they include some stories - e.g. Curiositas, Imago, Capsa - that appear infrequently elsewhere in the tradition.

=== Spanish: Sendebar, or Libro de los Engaños ===
While there are version of the narrative in Old Spanish that adhere to the narrative patterns found in the Western or European traditions, Libro de Los Engaños is part of the Eastern tradition.

=== Hebrew: Mischle Sendebar (משלי סנדבר) ===
The Hebrew translation ‘Mishle Sendebar’, is believed to originate from the 12th Century Mishle Sendebar is of the eastern branch of the seven sages; along with the Arabic, Old Spanish, Syriac, Greek, and Persian versions. These are known collectively as the Book of Sindibad. The Hebrew version is also the only version of the Eastern versions to name the sages.

Of the Eastern extant versions of the Seven Sages, Mishle Sendebar is the only version of the story in which the woman who accuses the prince of rape is not punished, but forgiven; upon the application of Judaism's Golden Rule.

This version is transmitted in 35 manuscripts and 4 print editions.

== The Seven Sages of Rome/ Dolopathos/ Diocletian ==
=== Dolopathos ===
The first surviving adaptation of the Book of Sindbad into the substantially different context of the Roman Imperial Court at the beginning of the Common Era is the Latin Dolopathos sive Rege et Septem Sapientibus, written sometime between 1184 and 1212 by Jean de Hauteseille (Johannes de Alta Silva), a monk of the Cistercian abbey of Haute-Seille near Toul. It contains only stories by the seven masters, and the empress does not tell her own stories. This was translated into French around 1210 by a trouvère named Herbers under the title Li romans de Dolopathos.

Latin: Dolopathos by Johannes de Alta Silva

Dedicated to the Bishop of Metz, whose diocese included the monastery of Haute-Seille, the Latin original Dolopathos is unique in comparison to other Western texts of the Seven Sages. The title translates as "suffering from grief", which is a compound of the Latin noun dolor (meaning pain or grief) and the Greek noun pathos (suffering).

The narrative is set in Sicily, where the benevolent King Dolopathos is slandered by his enemies. In defending himself before the Roman Emperor Augustus, he is given the emperor's wife's sister in marriage. Their son, Prince Lucinus, is educated by a single sage (Virgil in this story) as per other Eastern narratives.

The unique nature of the narrative is due to multiple aspects: the queen not telling stories in-between the sages' tales; the omission of certain expected tales; and the specific collection of tales included in Dolopathos, several of which are not found elsewhere in the tradition.

This version is transmitted in 11 manuscripts, and there are 3 modern editions:

- Hermann Oesterley (1873) in German, Johannes de Alta Silva: Dolopathos sive de rege et septem sapientibus
- Alfons Hilka (1913) in German, Johannes de Alta Silva: Dolopathos sive de rege et septem sapientibus written in German
- Brady B. Gilleland (1981) in English, Johannes de Alta Silva: Dolopathos

=== The Seven Sages of Rome ===
The most widely translated and adapted version of the Seven Sages/Book of Sindbad story matter was the Latin Historia Septem Sapientum (Story of the Seven Sages), composed by an unknown author most likely in Alsace some time between 1325 and 1342. It is itself translated from the French version known in scholarship as 'A'.

== Latin: Historia septem sapientum ==
The most widely translated and adapted version of the Seven Sages/Book of Sindbad story matter was the Latin Historia Septem Sapientum (Story of the Seven Sages), also referred to as Version H, composed by an unknown author most likely in Alsace some time between 1325 and 1342. It is itself translated from the French version known in scholarship as 'A'. The oldest surviving manuscript was composed in 1342, however it is likely that the text was circulated orally amongst the public from at least 1325, and possibly as early as 1285. This corresponds with the circulation period of the Gesta Romanorum, which itself contains many Seven Sages tales, in both Germany and France.

Known for its elaborate moralisations, the Version H emphasises the evilness of the empress through its reiteration at the end of each inset story. The conclusion of the frame tale is that the prince reveals one of the empress' handmaidens to be a man, which a contemporary audience would read as proof of adultery. The lover is then executed alongside the empress. Version H also showcases several modifications to the story order; a new story (Amatores) is added, and Senescalcus and Roma are combined to keep the total inset stories to 15.

Order of Inset Stories in Latin Version H Manuscripts
Sequence Number	Inset Story	Narrator
1	Arbor	Empress
2	Canis	First Master
3	Aper	Empress
4	Puteus	Second Master
5	Gaza	Empress
6	Avis	Third Master
7	Sapientes	Empress
8	Tentamina	Fourth Master
9	Virgilius	Empress
10	Medicus	Fifth Master
11	Senescalcus and Roma	Empress
12	Amatores	Sixth Master
13	Inclusa	Empress
14	Vidua	Seventh Master
15	Vaticinium and Amici	Prince

This version is transmitted in 198 manuscripts and consists of 4 groups, distinguished by small typographic mistakes and edits which indicate they come from similar origins.

The Latin Version H has been translated into English, French, Spanish, German, Dutch, Danish, Swedish, Icelandic, Armenian, Polish, Czech, and Russian.

=== German: Sieben weise Meister ===
The German adaptions of the Seven Sages tradition can be divided into several verse and prose versions, most of which follow the Latin Historia but sometimes change the order or selection of the embedded tales. The oldest known German version of the Seven Sages, Dyocletianus Leben by Hans von Bühel, dates back to 1412, whereas most of the surviving textual witnesses are from the 16th to the 18th century and often embedded into German adaptions of the Gesta Romanorum. Literary scholars have repeatedly emphasized the popularity of the Sieben weise Meister in the late Middle Ages and early modern period in contrast to its marginalization in modern literary historiography.

=== English: The Sevyn Sages ===
The Middle English metrical versions of the Seven Sages were probably based on the Old French prose Version A. The Middle English version survives in eight manuscripts, with the oldest, the Auchinleck Manuscript, currently held by the National Library of Scotland, dating from the early 14th century. Scholarship agrees that these represent three distinct versions based on dialectic differences. These groups are the 'Northern', 'Southern', and 'Midlands' versions. The Northern and Southern groups are closely related, with literary scholars assuming the existence of a lost 'parent-text' dubbed 'Y'. The Midlands text is not part of this group, due to notable stylistic deviations, though the same basic pattern is still adhered to.

Examples of deviations among the ‘Y’ group, or Southern and Northern versions, and the Midlands text include the empress's name. The ‘Y’ group calls her ‘Milicent’, whereas the Midlands text calls her ‘Helie’ or ‘Elye’. The name of the emperor, among all three groups, is always ‘Dioclecian’ and the prince either ‘Florentine’ or ‘Florentin’. All three groups mirror Middle English romances in narrative and form, containing, for example, lines with eight syllables and rhyming couplets.

Despite their close geographical proximity, the Middle English version is rather distinct from the Older Scots Version A and later English prints, which are considered part of the Historia Septem Sapientum or 'H' tradition (see above), such as the early 16th-century print by Wynkyn de Worde.

=== Czech: Kronika sedmi mudrců ===
Whilst the story was reproduced in Czech versions of the Gesta Romanorum, the oldest known print of the stories alone dates from 1502, translated and printed by Mikuláš Bakalář, a Bohemian printer who trained in Krakow. It is unclear whether the adaptation stems from the Latin Historia itself or a previous German translation. However, the text was popular and reprinted regularly. The Czech adaptation is notable for five tales which do not appear in other versions.

=== Polish: Poncjan (Historja o siedmiu mędrcach) ===
The Polish adaptations of the Seven Sages are believed to originate from a lost print by Jan z Koszyczek, from 1528 to 1532. His source text is unclear, however literary scholars agree that the story is related to the Historia text. It was well received in Poland and underwent regular reprints in the 17th, 18th, 19th, and 20th centuries. The Polish editions are believed to be the basis for Russian versions.

=== Scots ===
There is one Older Scots manuscript version of the text, found in the Asloan Manuscript in the National Library of Scotland. This text, The Buke of the Sevyne Sagis, is largely similar in structure to the medieval English versions of the narrative; it derives largely from the French prose Version A, but also exhibits influence of Version H, the Latin Historia Septem Sapientum. There were also several early modern prints of the narrative published in Scotland. One of the most important of these is The Sevyn Sages by John Rolland of Dalkeith edited for the Bannatyne Club (Edinburgh, 1837).

=== Swedish ===
The Old Swedish Historia was edited by Gustav Edward Klemming under the title Sju vise mästare.

== Literary legacy ==
The collection later supplied tales that circulated in both oral and written traditions. Giovanni Boccaccio used many of them for his famous work, the Decameron.

The Latin romance was frequently printed in the 15th century, and Wynkyn de Worde printed an English version about 1515. See:

- Gaston Paris, Deux rédactions du "Roman des sept sages de Rome" (Paris, Société des anciens textes français, 1876)
- Georg Büchner, Historia septem sapientium (Erlangen, 1889)
- Killis Campbell, A Study of the Romance of the Seven Sages with special reference to the middle English versions (Baltimore, 1898)
- Domenico Comparetti, Researches respecting the Book of Sindibdd (Folk-Lore Soc., 1882).

The Seven Sages Society, founded in 1975, maintained a perpetual scholarly bibliography, with annual updates in its on-line and printed (free of charge) newsletter.

The Seven Sage of Rome Database aims to catalogue manuscripts, prints, and secondary scholarship surrounding the story.

== Stories ==
The tale collection has been thought to contain the origins of the Aarne–Thompson–Uther tale type ATU 671, "The Three Languages". The story tells of a commoner boy who can understand the language of animals, which converse among themselves that the boy will lord over their mother and father in the future. His parents expel him for such affront. After a series of adventures, the boy becomes a king or pope and returns to his family's house. His parents serve him with a water and a towel and he reveals his identity.

== See also ==
- The Book of the Wiles of Women, 13th-century Spanish version of the tales
- Tutinama, another collection of Indian stories about women

== Sources ==
- Irwin, Bonnie D. "The Seven Sages," in Madieval Folklore: A Guide to Myths, Legends, Beliefs, and Customs, Carl Lindahl, John McNamara and John Lindow, eds. Oxford University Press, 2002.
- Runte, Hans R., J. Keith Wikeley and Anthony J. Farrell, The Seven Sages of Rome and the Book of Sindbad: An Analytical Bibliography, New York: Garland Publishing, Inc., 1984 (Garland Reference Library of the Humanities).
