= Tbilisoba =

Festival in Georgia

Coordinates: 41°41′34″N 44°48′23″E

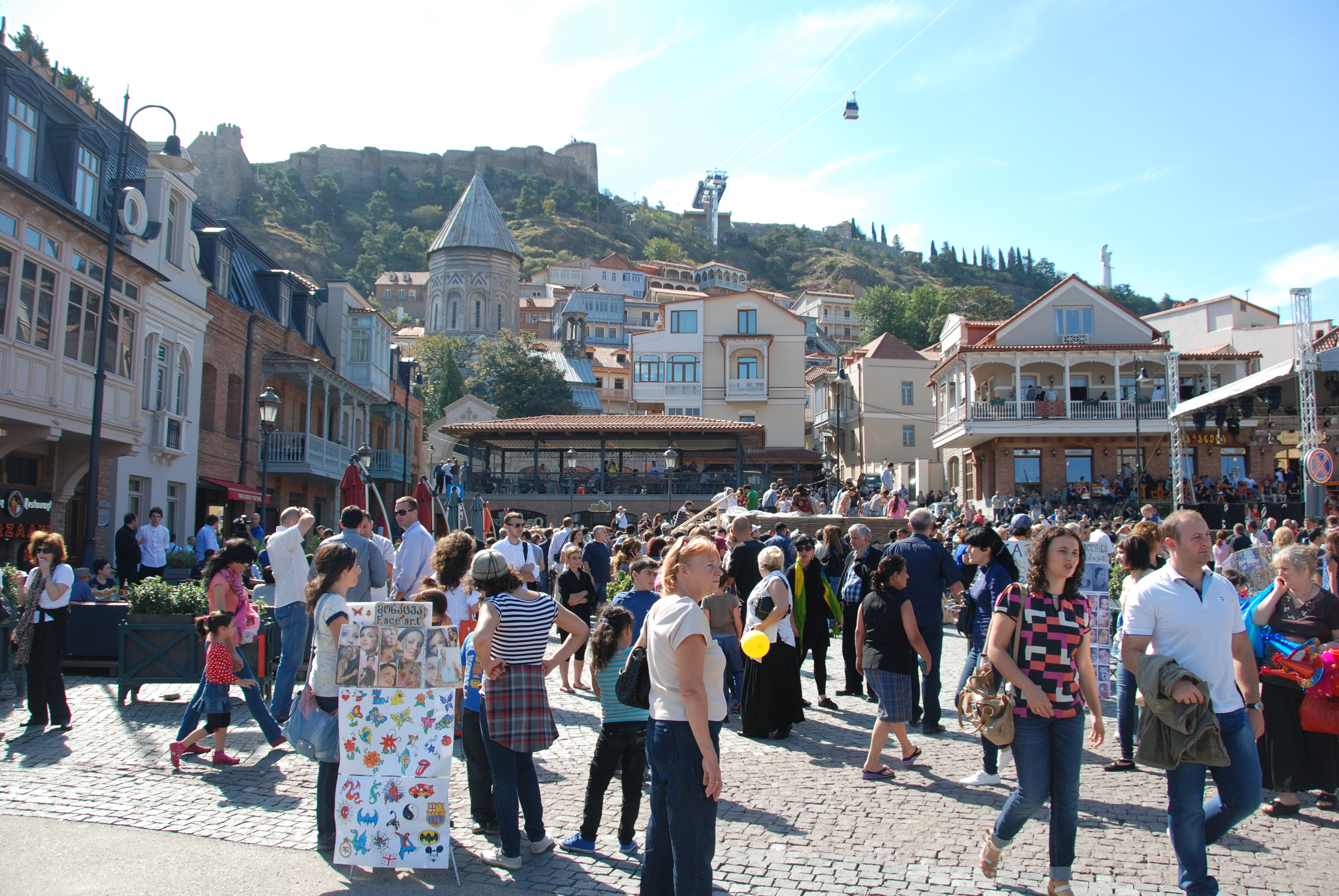
Tbilisoba 2012.

Tbilisoba (Georgian: თბილისობა) is an annual October festival which celebrates the diversity and history of Tbilisi, the capital of Georgia. It was first held on October 28, 1979, and has since become an established tradition. The festival features open-air concerts of traditional music and dancing and various cultural events, centered on Old Tbilisi, the historical part of the city. Beyond celebrating the city's past and present, people from all over Georgia represent their region at the fair of the harvest and Rtveli. Awarding honorary citizenship of Tbilisi by the city government also occurs in the framework of Tbilisoba.

== History ==
The festival was created at the initiative of Eduard Shevardnadze, then the First Secretary of the Communist Party of the Georgian Soviet Socialist Republic, to honor the capital and counter attendance at religious events as part of his program to overcome "manifestations of nationalism" through introducing new "socialist traditions". The event became a celebration of the city's 1,500-year history and had the unintended effect of engaging Georgians more intensely in their national history. The festival remained dormant during the civil unrest of the early 1990s. It was resumed in 1995 and has since been held annually, usually in the latter half of October.

== Videos ==
- Tbilisoba 1981
- Tbilisoba 2005
