= Chanticleer and the Fox =

Fable dating from the Middle Ages

Chanticleer and the Fox is a fable that dates from the Middle Ages. Though it can be compared to Aesop's fable of The Fox and the Crow, it is of more recent origin. The story became well known in Europe because of its connection with several popular literary works and was eventually recorded in collections of Aesop's Fables from the time of Heinrich Steinhowel and William Caxton onwards. It is numbered 562 in the Perry Index.

== Story ==
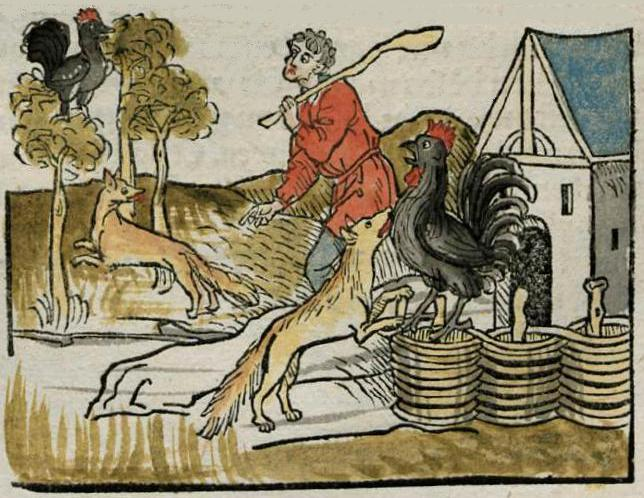
A coloured illustration of the fable from Steinhöwel's Esopus, c.1501

Chanticleer is a rooster who lives with his three wives in an enclosure on a rich man's farm. He is warned in a dream that he will be captured by a predator, but he ignores this warning. His favourite wife, Pinte, tells him that she has seen the fox Renart lurking in the cabbage patch. Eventually the two creatures meet, and Renart flatters Chanticleer by talking about how Chanticleer's father was a great singer. If the son is to equal his father, he explains, he must shut his eyes as he stretches his neck to crow. When Chanticleer shuts his eyes and crows, the fox seizes him and makes a run for the woods, with the farm workers and a mastiff in pursuit. Chanticleer now advises the fox to turn around and defy them, but when he opens his mouth to do so, Chanticleer flies up to safety in a tree. The rooster and the fox each blame themselves for the gullibility their pride has led them into.

== Mediaeval background ==
Because the tale of Chanticleer and the Fox enters into several mediaeval narrative masterworks, there has been considerable investigation into the question of its origin. It has also been asserted that the tale has developed out of the basic situation in Aesop's fable of The Fox and the Crow. Early examples of the story are pithily fabular but towards the middle of the 12th century it appears as an extended episode of the Reynard cycle under the title "How Renart captured Chanticleer the cock" (Si comme Renart prist Chanticler le Coq). The work of which it was part was immensely popular and spread widely in translation.

Both before and contemporary with this long, circumstantial narrative, shorter versions were recorded in a number of sources. One of the earliest is Ademar de Chabannes' 11th century fable in Latin prose of a fox who flatters a partridge into shutting her eyes and then seizes her; the partridge persuades the fox to pronounce her name before eating her and so escapes. In the following century Marie de France tells a fable very similar to the Renart version in Old French verse. Similar short tales had followed the long telling in the Reynard Cycle. They include the story of Renart and the Tomtit, in which the frustrated fox tries to persuade his 'cousin' to greet him with a kiss and eventually has to flee at the approach of dogs. This is obviously a variant version of The Cock, the Dog and the Fox. After another episode (in which Renart injures his paw), the fable of the Fox and the Crow is adapted to become the tale of Renart and Tiécelin. Here the fox flatters the crow into singing and so dropping the round cheese it has stolen. Even this early, such a grouping indicates that contemporaries were aware of the kinship of these stories.

Two other longer adaptations of the fable were eventually written in Britain. The first of these was Geoffrey Chaucer's The Nun's Priest's Tale, a section of his extended work, The Canterbury Tales, that was written about 1390. This consists of 626 lines of 10-syllable couplets and introduces significant variations. The scene takes place in a poor woman's garden-close where Chauntecleer the cock presides over a harem of seven hens, among whom Pertolete is his favourite. When Chauntecleer has a premonitory dream of his capture, it is Pertolete who argues that it has no significance and initiates a long and learned debate on the question. The rest of the story is much as in the other versions except that at the end the fox tries to charm down the escaped cock a second time before the two creatures condemn their own credulous foolishness. The tale remained popular so long as Chaucer's Middle English was generally accessible to people. Then the poet John Dryden wrote an updated version titled "The Cock and the Fox" (1700). Although this follows Chaucer's text more or less closely, he adds a few comments of his own and expands it to 820 lines in heroic couplets.

In the meantime the Scottish poet Robert Henryson had produced his freer version of Chaucer's tale, The Taill of Schir Chanticleir and the Foxe, written in the 1480s. This consists of 31 rhyme royal stanzas and is more or less dependent on Chaucer's telling but for one important particular. In place of the extended debate on dreams, this poem's rhetorical episode is reserved until after the capture of Chanticleir by the fox and so adds to the suspense. In this, his three wives voice their various responses to what they believe will be his inevitable death.

== Adaptations ==
The Taill of Schir Chanticleir and the Foxe is the third fable in The Morall Fabillis of Esope the Phrygian, a seminal folkloric work by Scots-language poet Robert Henryson. It was composed in Scotland during the 15th century.

Continued appreciation of the kinship between the tales of the Fox and the Crow and The Cock and the Fox is indicated by the mid-18th century Chelsea tea service which has the former illustrated on the saucer and the latter on the cup. A little later the Cock and the Fox appears on a tile from a Liverpool pottery. These seem to be inspired by the 18th century collections of Aesop's fables. A 1520 misericord carved by John Wake on a choir stall of Beverley Minster, on the other hand, draws from the Chaucerian version of the story. A fox has stolen a goose and the cries of the other geese attract the attention of an old woman, who rushes out of the house (SH20).

There have been several musical settings of Chaucer's story, of which the first was Gordon Jacob's The Nun's Priest's Tale for chorus and orchestra, which had its premiere in 1951 and is still performed. The largest and most important of his choral works, it is in ten movements. While the narrative is sung by all, Chanticleer's part is rendered by the tenor and bass voices, Pertolete's by soprano and alto. The words used are from the translation by Nevill Coghill, who was also responsible for the lyrics in the rock-pop musical Canterbury Tales, the original score of which included the Nun's Priest's Tale among its five episodes. Set to music by John Hawkins and Richard Hill, the work was first presented at the Oxford Playhouse in 1964 and went on to be performed around the world.

In the children's storybook Chanticleer and the Fox, Barbara Cooney retells The Nun's Priest's Tale, using her own illustrations. Published in 1958, it was the recipient of the Caldecott Medal for illustration in 1959. Its robust confrontation of the problem of good and evil was considered as challenging for younger readers. Among other works that were created specially for children there was Chanticleer and the Fox, a musical play based on the Nun's Priest's Tale, in which the collaborators were the composer of light music Edward Hughes and the poet Peter Westmore (Oxford 1966). It was followed by Michael Hurd's Rooster Rag, a 13-minute pop cantata for narrator and unison voices that was commissioned and first performed in May 1975 at the Cookham Festival. The main chorus is of six hens, and there are the solo characters of Chanticleer, Pertelote and Mr Fox for stage versions. The choice of title was influenced by the popular "Chanticleer Rag" of 1910. However, the original cover illustration for that (based on a costume design by Coquelin) and the words make it clear that its inspiration was Edmond Rostand's drama Chantecler about a cock that believed the sun would not rise unless it crowed first.

Several other works claim to be inspired by Chaucer's tale but, like Rostand's play and the 1990 cartoon feature film Rock-a-Doodle based on it, have little connection with the original Renart Cycle version beyond using the name Chanticleer, or variants of it.

== See also ==
- Foxes in popular culture
