= The Frog and the Mouse =

Aesop's fable

A plate from 1880 illustrating the fable

The Frog and the Mouse is one of Aesop's Fables and exists in several versions. It is numbered 384 in the Perry Index. There are also Eastern versions of uncertain origin which are classified as Aarne-Thompson type 278, concerning unnatural relationships. The stories make the point that the treacherous are destroyed by their own actions.

== The Greek fable and mediaeval variations ==
The basic story is of a mouse that asks a frog to take her to the other side of a stream and is secured to the frog's back. Midway across, the frog submerges and drowns the mouse, which floats to the surface. A passing kite picks it from the water and carries the frog after it, eventually eating both. Other versions depict them as friends on a journey together or else exchanging hospitality.

The story was variously interpreted in the Middle Ages. Odo of Cheriton's version does not demonstrate treachery but only foolish association; through trusting to the frog's offer, both lose their lives when the kite swoops upon them. The moral ballade based on the story by Eustache Deschamps demonstrates "How gentle words are frequently deceptive". The mouse is escaping famine and accepts the frog's offer to tow it across the river; the story then continues as Ysoppe dit en son livre et raconte (according to Aesop's account). Marie de France's story is more circumstantial and concludes differently from most others. The mouse lives contentedly in a mill and offers hospitality to a passing frog. The frog then lures the mouse into crossing the stream on the pretense of showing her his home. While he is trying to drown his passenger, the pair are seized by the kite, who eats the frog first because it is fat. Meanwhile, the mouse struggles free of its bonds and survives.

At the start of the 15th century, the poet John Lydgate expanded Marie's story even further. The most significant additional detail is the mouse's moralising on the happiness of being satisfied with one's lot. It is as a result of this that the frog is preferred by the kite for its fatness, since the virtuous mouse, being content with little, is "slender and lean". Lydgate's account was followed by two more vernacular versions. In William Caxton's collection of the fables, it is a rat on pilgrimage who asks the frog's help to cross a river. A Scottish poem under the title The Paddock and the Mouse appears among Robert Henryson's Morall Fabillis of Esope the Phrygian and is an expanded version of Eustache Deschamps' version, in the course of which the frog offers to carry the journeying mouse over to the grain fields on the stream's other bank. Henryson interprets the tale in his concluding ballade, making the point that "Foul mind is hid by words both fair and free" and that it is better to be content with one's lot "Than with companion wicked to be paired".

== Renaissance versions ==
The mediaeval theme of unwary trust continued into the Renaissance. The fable was among those translated into German by Martin Luther in 1530, with a text based upon the Heinrich Steinhöwel version. The lesson to be learned from it is firstly to be on the watch for deceit, but also that the deceitful may equally be victim of their own wiles. In modern times his text was set by Hans Poser in his Die Fabeln des Äsop for accompanied choir (Op. 28, 1956).

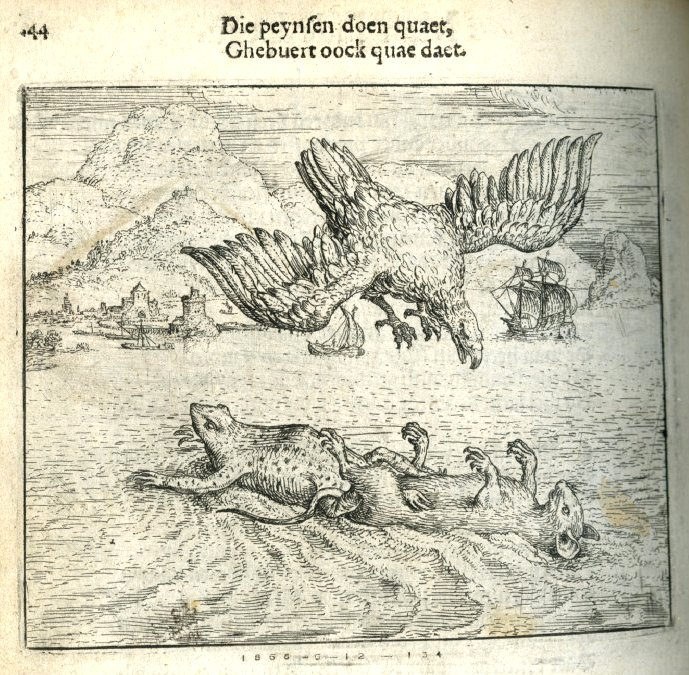
Marcus Gheeraerts the Elder's illustration of the fable in Warachtighe Fabulen der Dieren (1567)

Compilers of emblem books also began using the fable as an illustration. Titled in Dutch as "The Toad and the Rat", it appeared in Eduwaert de Dene's De Warachtighe Fabulen der Dieren (True Animal Fables, 1567). There it is accompanied by the proverb "The ill you do comes back to you" and an engraving of the toad towing the rat over a broad river as a falcon swoops down upon them. A similar design reversed appears in Christoph Murer's XL emblemata miscella nova (1622), with moralising lines that ascribe the tale to Aesop "who can be trusted" under the ironical title "Friends in misfortune" (Amici in tempore adverso).

Jean de la Fontaine invented his own fanciful details to bulk out his retelling of the fable in 1668. There the frog feigns friendship and invites a fat rat to a banquet, intending to drown and eat it while swimming across the marsh. Then a kite that has seen them struggling in the water carries both away for a feast of its own. As in the case of the emblems, the moral is that the trickster often falls into the trap of his making.

A very similar illustration to those in the emblem books accompanied a story much like La Fontaine's in the Phryx Aesopus (1564) of the Neo-Latin poet Hieronymus Osius. The story was followed by a second, however, in which the two creatures figure as enemies disputing rulership of the marsh in which they live and are carried off by the kite as they fight. This was the principal variant of the fable to emerge during the Renaissance in an attempt to explain the frog's motivation, never explained in any earlier account. Behind his behaviour is the situation at the start of the ancient mock epic Batrachomyomachia in which a frog carrying a mouse on its back had submerged from fear of a snake and inadvertently drowned his rider. In revenge, the mice declared war on the frogs and ever after the two had been enemies.

In a translation of another Latin retelling towards the end of the 16th century, Arthur Golding drew a parallel with this old enmity in the manuscript of his "A Moral Fabletalk". The merging of the different battles into an extended fable was carried forward by John Ogilby in 1668, soon to be followed by accounts of their marshland battle with reeds and bulrushes for weapons in the fable collections of Francis Barlow (1687), Roger L'Estrange (1692) and Samuel Croxall (1722). In the aftermath of civil strife and revolution, it was an apt opportunity to preach civil concord, but the fable had by now wandered far from Aesop's original story-line. That was not to return in English sources until George Fyler Townsend's retranslation of 1887, where the moral of his tale once again underlines treachery with the proverbial verse, "Harm hatch, harm catch".

Croxall's account in particular was frequently reprinted into the second half of the 19th century, and was also incorporated into other compilations of fables. Among the latter was Samuel Lysons' Christian Fables or the Fables of Aesop and Other Writers Christianized (London 1850), where the moral is given a new application. Croxall's had been a political appeal to "throw away the ridiculous Distinctions of Party" which weaken the state. In Victorian times, Lysons targets the squabbling between Christian factions who ought instead to unite since "divisions in church and state only render us more open to the attacks of our great and natural enemy – the Devil".

== The Eastern analogue ==
Aesop's fable was current in the Middle East during mediaeval times and is told at great length by Rumi in his Masnavi as an example of the dangers of unequal friendship.

At about the same time, a different version concerning a scorpion and a tortoise had emerged among the fables of Bidpai. The scorpion asks the tortoise to carry it across a stream and promises that it will do no harm. When the tortoise discovers that the scorpion is trying to drive its sting through his shell, he dives and drowns its treacherous passenger. Although many of Bidpai's stories can be traced back to the ancient Hindu fable collection, the Panchatantra, no Sanskrit version of the scorpion story exists. A German study by Arata Takeda suggests that it was introduced during the 12th and 13th century in the Persian language area.

Takeda's study began as an attempt to find the origin of a more recent hybrid tale with elements of both Aesop's fable and the Eastern analogue. In this, it is a frog that is asked by the scorpion to carry it across the water. To allay the frog's suspicions, the scorpion argues that this would be safe since, if he stung the frog, both would drown. The frog agrees, but midway across the river the scorpion does indeed sting the frog. When asked the reason for his illogical action, the scorpion explains that this is simply his nature. The earliest verifiable appearance of this variant was in the 1954 script of Orson Welles' film Mr. Arkadin. On account of its dark morality, there have been many popular references since then. The moral that there is no hope of reform in the basically vicious was common in ancient times and was exemplified, for example, in Aesop's fable of The Farmer and the Viper, but no evidence exists of a link between them.

Claims are sometimes made, also without supporting evidence, that the fable of the frog and the scorpion is of Arab origin, but the authentic West Asian stories in which these two appear are completely different. A Sufi source from the 6th century illustrates divine providence with the tale of a scorpion that crosses the Nile on a frog's back in order to save a sleeping drunkard from being stung by a snake. There was also a Jewish variant in the Babylonian Talmud tractate Nedarim 41a in which a rabbi witnessed a scorpion crossing a river in the same way in order to sting a man to death. In neither case is the frog harmed.
