= The Paddock and the Mouse =

Poem by Robert Henryson

"The Paddock and the Mouse" is a poem by the 15th-century Scottish poet Robert Henryson and part of his collection of moral fables known as the Morall Fabillis of Esope the Phrygian. It is written in Middle Scots. As with the other tales in the collection, appended to it is a moralitas which elaborates on the moral that the fable is supposed to contain.

The tale is an expansion of Aesop's Fable of The Frog and the Mouse and concerns a mouse that desires to cross a stream. A paddock (Note: Either a toad or a frog. Robert L. Kindrick notes that "Apparently toads, frogs, and paddocks are sometimes treated indifferently in medieval literature"; he nevertheless notes it firstly as a frog, corresponding with rava in Gualterus Anglicus' version of Aesop's Fables, a source of Henryson's. In his modern English text, Seamus Heaney simply translates as "toad".) offers his assistance and, to prove his trustworthiness, discusses the difference between appearing and being virtuous. As the two cross the stream tied together, the paddock betrays and tries to drown the mouse. Their struggle is seen by a kite (bird), who grabs and kills them both.

== Synopsis ==
=== Tale ===
A mouse is sat alongside a stream, lamenting being unable to cross it and reach the cereals and other foodstuffs on the opposite side. A paddock approaches and says that she will assist her in crossing; the mouse enquires as to how the creature is able to swim, and she explains how her anatomy allows her to. However, the mouse suspects, on the basis of physiognomy, that the paddock is untrustworthy; she highlights her features, and recites the proverb that a man's morals is shown in his face. To this the paddock replies with another proverb, do not judge a man by his looks, and gives several instances in which goodness in appearance is not replicated in spirit. Finally, the mouse accedes to the help, although is still concerned about a potential loss of liberty and life which will accompany being tied to the paddock as they cross the water; she makes the paddock swear an oath that she will assist her in crossing. The two tie themselves together with some string and proceed to swim. However, as they start across the stream the paddock swims downwards with the intention of drowning the mouse; the mouse decries the creature's deception, but struggles upwards to prevent herself from drowning. Seeing the struggle is a nearby kite. The bird flies down and grabs the two—as they are bound together—and carries them away, where he kills and disembowels them, though they do not satiate his appetite much.

== Notes ==
Preceded by The Taill of the Wolf and the Lamb	The Morall Fabillis by Robert Henryson	Succeeded by -
