= The Taill of the Lyoun and the Mous =

Preceded by The Taill of the Scheip and the Doig	The Morall Fabillis by Robert Henryson	Succeeded by The Preiching of the Swallow

The Taill of the Lyoun and the Mous is the seventh poem in Robert Henryson's cycle The Morall Fabillis of Esope the Phrygian written in Middle Scots. In the accepted text of thirteen poems it thus occupies the central position in the cycle. This fact is further underlined by the stanza count of the full cycle, in which the fabill itself, 24 stanzas in length, makes an architectural division of the lave of the entire cycle, before and after, in two roundly equal sections of 200 stanzas each. The Taill of the Lyoun and the Mous is also the only fabill in the cycle to appear as part of a dream vision.
