= Herrnstein =

Herrnstein is a surname. Notable people with the surname include:

- Albert E. Herrnstein (1882–1958), American football player and coach
- Barbara Herrnstein Smith (born 1932), American literary critic and theorist
- John Herrnstein (1938–2017), American baseball and football player
- Richard Herrnstein (1930–1994), Jewish American psychologist

== See also ==
- Hernstein, a town in Austria
