= Burgess (title) =

Medieval, early modern European title

A burgess was the holder of a certain status in an English, Irish or Scottish borough in the Middle Ages and the early modern period, designating someone of the burgher class. It originally meant a freeman of a borough or burgh, but later came to be used mostly for office-holders in a town or one of its representatives in the House of Commons of England.

== Etymology ==
The word Burge (and its related forms such as borough, burg, bourg) derives from the Proto-Indo-European root *bhergh-, meaning "high," with derivatives referring to hills and hill-forts. This root is also reflected in Indo-Iranian languages, where it carried the sense of "tower" and "fortress."

- Germanic Branch

The Oxford English Dictionary states that borough is "a word inherited from Germanic," with its earliest known use in the Old English period (pre-1150). The Online Etymology Dictionary traces it to Old English burg, burh ("a dwelling or dwellings within a fortified enclosure"), from Proto-Germanic *burgs ("hill fort, fortress"), with cognates in Old Norse borg ("wall, castle"), Old High German burg ("fortified place, citadel"), and Gothic baurgs ("city"). The meaning shifted in Old English from "fortress" to "fortified town," and then simply "town" by the 16th century.

- Greek-Latin Branch and French

The root also reached Greek as πύργος (pýrgos), meaning "tower, wall, fortress." The Dictionnaire de l'Académie française states that French bourg (12th century, burc) is derived from Late Latin burgus ("ensemble of fortified dwellings"), of Germanic origin, under the influence of Greek purgos ("tower"). The Centre National de Ressources Textuelles et Lexicales (CNRTL) confirms that Late Latin burgus is a crossing between Latin burgus (from Greek πύργος, "tower") and the Germanic feminine *burg ("fortified settlement"). The 17th-century French scholar Nicot also noted the connection: "Bourg... vient de Pyrgus purgos... Burgus purgos, turrim significat et castellum."

- German

In German, Burg (feminine) is traced to Old High German burg, Middle High German burc, from Proto-Germanic *burgs. The Deutsches Wörterbuch by Jacob and Wilhelm Grimm notes the connection to Greek πύργος and Latin burgus, listing cognates including Gothic baurgs, Old English burg, and English borough.

- Summary

The path of evolution is as follows:

PIE *bhergh- (high) → Proto-Germanic *burgs (hill-fort) → Old English burg/burh → Modern English borough; and → Greek πύργος → Late Latin burgus → French bourg; and → Old High German burg → Modern German Burg

The word was derived in Middle English and Middle Scots from the Old French word burgeis, simply meaning "an inhabitant of a town" (cf. burgeis or burges respectively). The Old French word burgeis is derived from bourg, meaning a market town or medieval village, itself derived from Late Latin burgus, meaning "fortress" or "wall". In effect, the reference was to the north-west European medieval and renaissance merchant class which tended to set up their storefronts along the outside of the city wall, where traffic through the gates was an advantage and safety in event of an attack was easily accessible. The right to seek shelter within a burg was known as the right of burgess. In Irish the name appears as buirgéiseach, in Scottish Gaelic as bùirdeas, in Welsh as bwrdeis, Scots burges and Latin burgensis.

The term was close in meaning to the Germanic term burgher, a formally defined class in medieval German cities (Middle Dutch burgher, Dutch burger and German Bürger). It is also linguistically close to the French term bourgeois, which evolved from burgeis.

== Usage in England ==
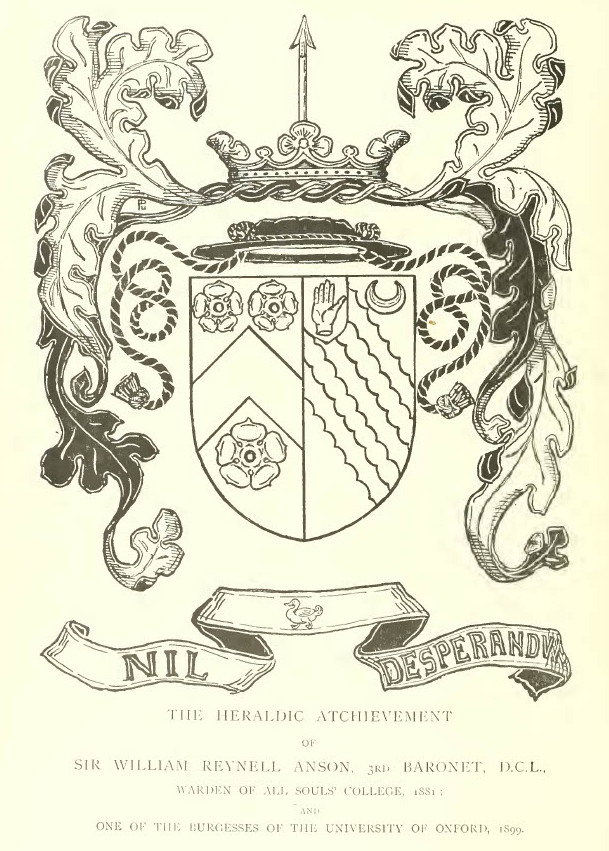
Sir William Anson was, among other things, "...One of the Burgesses of the University of Oxford," in 1899

In England, burgess meant an elected or unelected official of a borough, or the representative of one in the House of Commons of England. This use of the word burgess has since disappeared. Burgesses as freemen had the sole right to vote in municipal or parliamentary elections. However, in Britain and Ireland these special privileges were removed by the Reform Act 1832.

== Usage in Ireland ==
The title of burgess also existed in some Irish cities and towns, dating back to the 12th-century Norman conquest of Ireland. English, Welsh and Norman colonists were offered the title of "burgess" in settlements of the Lordship of Ireland. Tenants on burgage land could freely lease or buy other land from their lord, sell their land or leave the property. A typical annual rent for a burgage was one shilling. They could also hold a "hundred court" separate from the manorial court.

The title was also used in settlements established after the Plantations of the 16th–17th centuries.

Under the 1841 Municipal Corporations Reform (Ireland) Act, those who occupied property with a rateable valuation of £10 or more could vote in corporation elections and had the title "burgess."

== Usage in Scotland ==
Burgesses were originally freeman inhabitants of a city in which they owned land and who contributed to the running of the town and its taxation. The title of burgess was later restricted to merchants and craftsmen, so that only burgesses could enjoy the privileges of trading or practising a craft in the city through belonging to a guild (by holding a guild ticket) or were able to own companies trading in their guild's craft. One example are the Burgesses of Edinburgh.

The burgesses' ancient exclusive trading rights through their Guilds were abolished in 1846. Thereafter a burgess became a title that gave social standing to the office and usually carried with it a role which involved charitable activities of their guild or livery company, as it does today.

== Usage in American colonies ==
The term was also used in some of the Thirteen Colonies. In the Colony of Virginia, a "burgess" was a member of the legislative body, which was termed the "House of Burgesses". In Connecticut, New Jersey, and Pennsylvania, the Burgess, or Chief Burgess, was the executive of many colonial-era municipalities until the turn of the 20th century, and persists in some places as the highest ranking magistrate of a municipality.

== "Greensleeves" reference ==
The original version of the well-known English folk song "Greensleeves" includes the following:

Thy purse and eke thy gay guilt knives,
thy pincase gallant to the eye:
No better wore the Burgesse wives,
and yet thou wouldst not love me.

This clearly implies that at the time when it was composed (late 16th to early 17th century) a burgess was proverbial as being able to provide his wife with beautiful and expensive clothes.

== See also ==
- Burgher (title)
- Bourgeois
- Citizen
- Bourgeois of Brussels
- Poorter
- House of Burgesses of Virginia, the first elected legislative assembly in the New World
- Borough and Burg
- "The Taill of the Uponlandis Mous and the Burges Mous", a poem from Scotland which partly satirised the class.
- Burgage
