= The Cock and the Jewel =

Aesop's fable

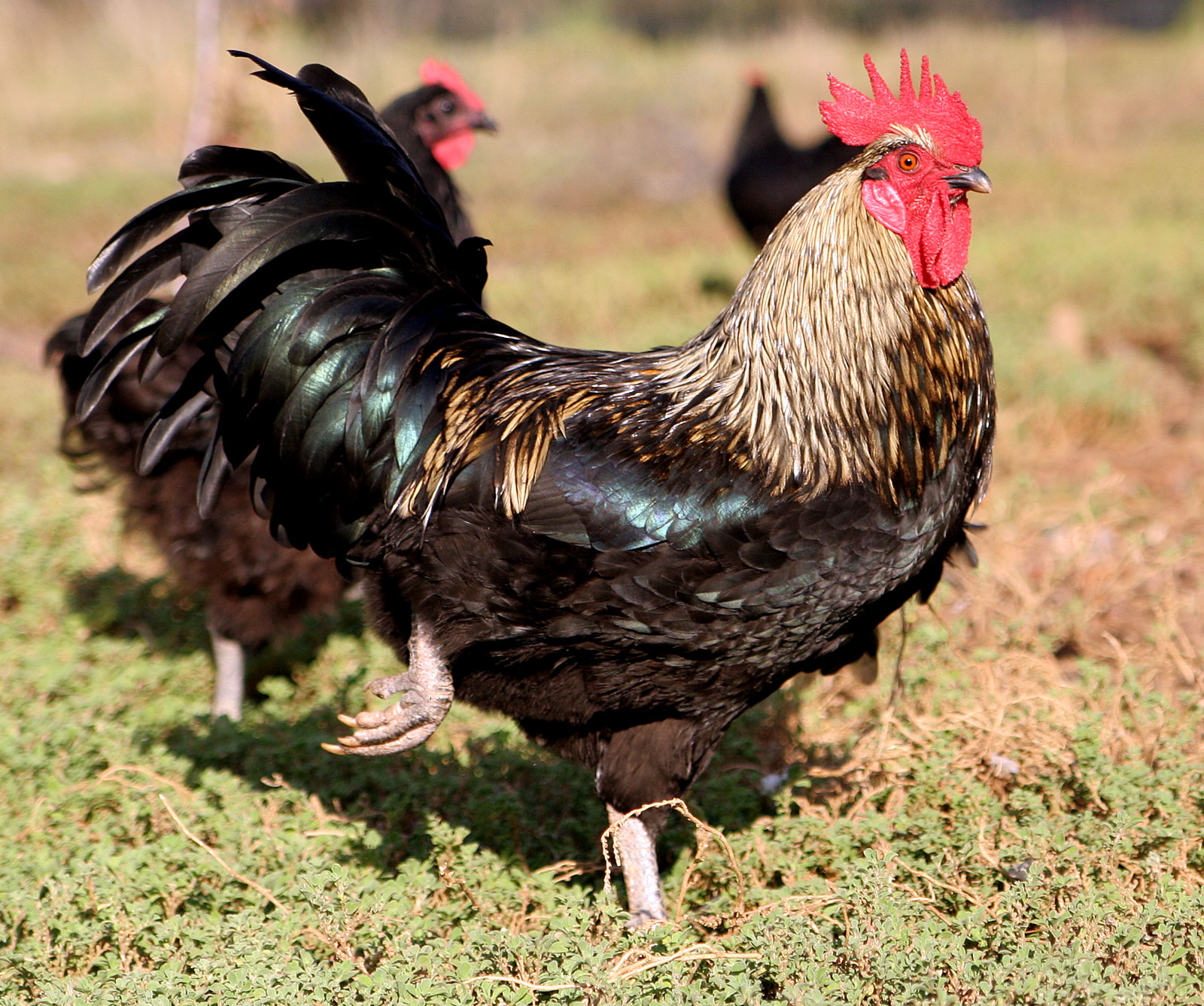
The "noble cockerel", as highlighted by John Lydgate

The Cock and the Jewel is a fable attributed to Aesop and is numbered 503 in the Perry Index. As a trope in literature, the fable is reminiscent of stories used in Zen such as the kōan. It presents, in effect, a riddle on relative values and is capable of different interpretations, depending on the point of view from which it is regarded.

== Fable to proverb ==
In its most cogent, unelaborated form, the fable is very short. A cockerel seeking food finds instead a precious gemstone, recognises the worth it has for others, but rejects it as being of no practical use to himself. The rejection is generally shown in the form of a direct address by the cockerel to the gemstone, as in this modern English translation: "Ho!" said he, "a fine thing you are, no doubt, and, had your owner found you, great would his joy have been. But for me, give me a single grain of corn before all the jewels in the world."

The fable was well enough known in Renaissance Britain for the Cock's preference to become proverbial. "Prefer not a barlie corne before a pretious jewel", a character in Robert Greene's Euphues His Censure (1587) warns; and Francis Quarles laments that "We catch at barley-grains, while pearls stand by despised" in his Divine Emblems (1635). Yet another character, in Henry Fielding's The Temple Beau (1729), points out that "virtue loses not its worth by being slighted by the world, more than the pearl when the foolish cock preferred a barleycorn".

== Literary tradition ==
The Cock and the Jewel was given prominence in medieval Europe by virtue of the fact that it opens what was then a standard text for the teaching of grammar, the so-called elegiac Romulus. This was generally committed to memory in early school years. The fable is typically short and given in eight lines of elegiac metre with a further two providing a moral judgement. It portrays the cock as startled to discover such a beautiful object in the dirt (in sorde manens) and recognising that he is not the right creature to have found it. The writer's emphatic moral conclusion provided the standard medieval interpretation of the fable: "Cockerel, you represent a fool, jewel, you stand for the fine gift of wisdom; for the fool, this corn has no taste" (Tu Gallo stolidum, tu iaspide pulcra sophye, / Dona notes; stolido nil sapit ista seges).

The explicit judgement of the cock's action as foolish, on the grounds that the jewel represents wisdom rather than mere allure or material wealth, may represent the standard mediaeval answer to Aesop's riddle, but variants in the tradition did exist. The story stands at the head of Marie de France's 12th-century fable collection, the Ysopet. There she adds a detail common in later retellings, that the cock is scratching on a dunghill, so emphasizing the contrast between the find and its location. The cock makes the observation that a rich man would have known how to make proper use of the gem it has uncovered, whereas "since I can't embellish you as I would like, I'll not wear you at all." At odds with this reasonable conclusion, Marie comments that the cock is like those who, "if everything does not go as they wish, they do not value good and honor at all but instead take the worst and scorn the best."

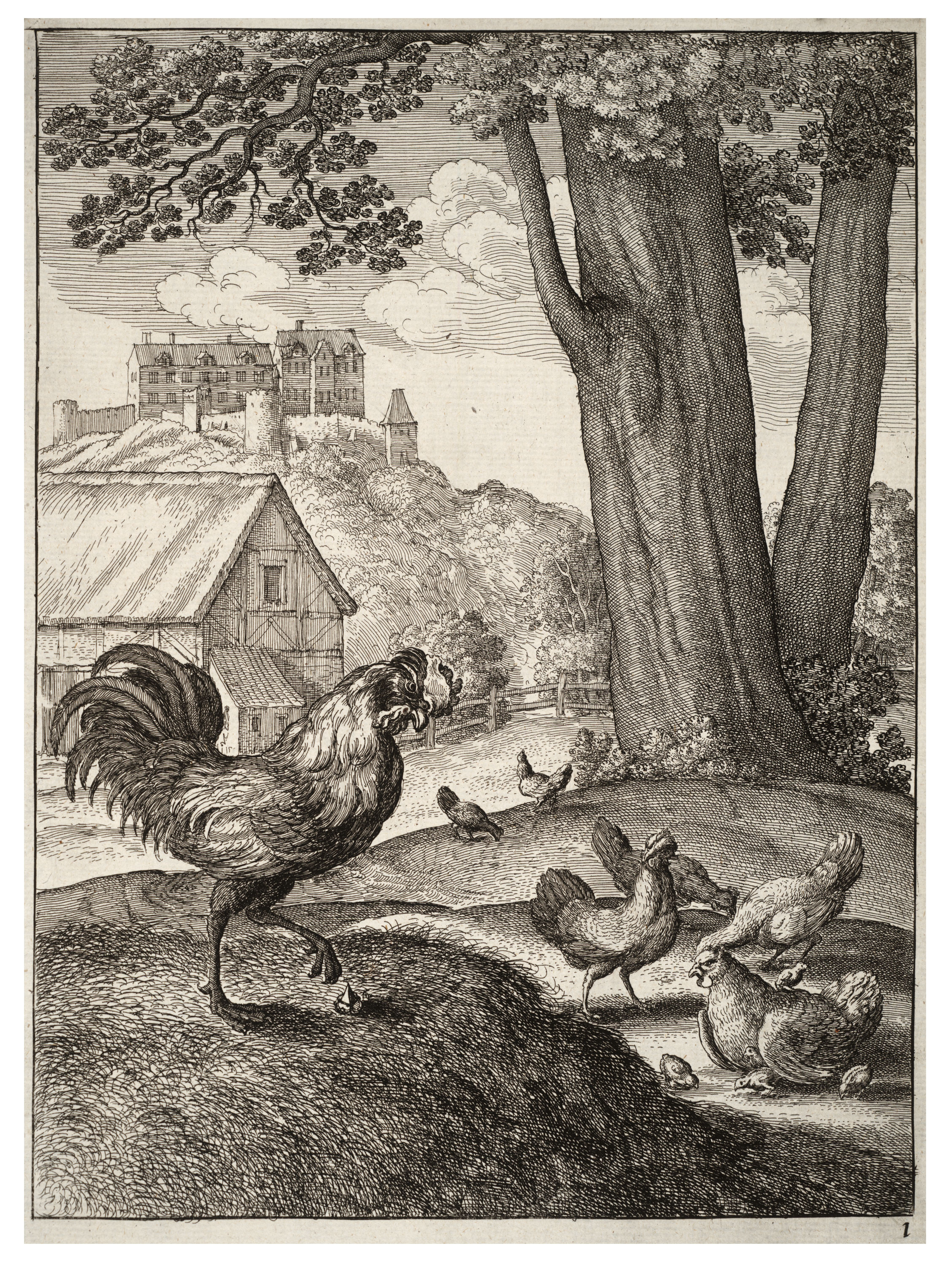
Illustration by Wenceslas Hollar for The Fables of Aesop, 1665

John Lydgate's version, written about 1410, is longer and more nuanced. He begins the Prologue to his Isopes Fabules with the statement that "Wisdom is more in price than gold in coffers" but turns that to mean that beneath the "boysterous and rurall" fable hide valuable lessons for life, so anticipating the Cock's eventual find. In his description of the Cock, Lydgate presents it as a noble beast and a notable example of diligence. On discovering a jacinth in the dunghill, the Cock rejects keeping it as being contrary to his natural station in life. All the wisdom it might symbolise, from his practical point of view, is no better than speculation on 'how the man came first into the moon'. Lydgate then comments that the Cock has made the wisest choice in rejecting worldliness and preferring virtue. Some three centuries later, the periodical writer John Hawkesworth adapted the story to a similar moral in an extended poem, "The Fop, Cock, and Diamond", in The Gentleman's Magazine for 1741. There the diamond's journey is traced from the ring of a man-about-town to its discovery by the cock, whose noble conduct is contrasted with the vain behaviour of its previous owner, leading to the advice that one should keep one's wants to simple necessities.

Samuel Croxall's prose retelling, originally published in 1722 and many times reprinted, also approaches this conclusion. Noting the fable's ambiguity, he comments that "the most probable intention of the author was to hold forth an example of industry and good sense. The lesson inculcated is the wisdom of estimating things by their intrinsic worth, and of refusing to be led away by doubtful fascinations from the known path of duty." But the Cock's abstention from the trappings of the governing class is also capable of the political reading given it by John Ogilby in his Fables of Aesop paraphras'd in verse (1665). The lesson there of maintaining the balance of social relations is emphasised further by Wenceslaus Hollar's accompanying print in which the cock astride its dunghill is wittily contrasted with the Germanic castle on the neighbouring hilltop.

The other literary expansion to survive from the 15th century is Robert Henryson's The Morall Fabillis of Esope the Phrygian, written c.1480, with which this fable, under the title of The Taill of the Cok and the Jasp, begins. His own moral conclusion follows the standard verse Romulus closure, making the rejected jasp an unambiguous figure for wisdom and condemning the consequent materialism of the cockerel. This is in line with the Biblical simile of the uselessness of casting pearls before swine, to which Henryson alludes in the poem. For him the state of nature is limited by brute appetite; it requires wisdom to discern the way of learning and virtue. Caxton appears to agree in his contemporary publication of the fables (1484). The cock, he says, represents "the fool whiche careth not for sapyence ne for wysedome", but then draws the sting from his criticism in continuing "and by the stone is to vnderstond this fayre and playsaunt book".

In La Fontaine's Fables it is given a materialist twist by likening the cock to those who are incapable of judging the 'intrinsic worth' of anything (I.20). After a very brief telling of the cock's rejection of the pearl as being inedible, La Fontaine describes a parallel situation in which a man inherits a valuable manuscript but prefers to have cash in hand for it. According to his reading of the fable, what the man and the cock lack is aesthetic judgement rather than wisdom. Some later interpretations are equally materialistic. Thomas Bewick applies the fable to the choice of sexual partner in his Select Fables of Aesop (1784), while the Canadian author Robertson Davies converts it to a playlet satirising devotees of the Reader's Digest in his A Masque of Aesop (1955).

== Artistic interpretations ==
Such a short fable suggested little latitude for invention to most book illustrators, apart from the sly juxtaposition of dunghill and castle already noted in Hollar's print. The same criticism can be made of the nearly contemporary Flemish painting of the subject by Frans Snyders. In the second half of the 19th century, the French animal painter Philibert Léon Couturier, whose specialty was poultry, managed to provide two amusing variations on the theme. In Le coq et la perle, now in the Musée Denon, Chalon-sur-Saône, the bird struts by with a pearl pendant hanging from its beak, the image of self-regard. In contrast, Coq et perle pictures the bird approaching a fallen necklace with great caution. A more symbolical interpretation by Gustav-Adolf Mossa depicts a fashionable courtier in motley dress that includes a cock's comb. So engrossed is he in his own appearance that he ignores a female beauty dressed in white who stands in the background looking at him.

La Fontaine's version of the fable allowed illustrations of the simpleton selling a valuable edition to whom he compared the cock. Settings of his words have been comparatively rare. In 1873 it was set for men's voices by Emile Pessard, and later for a capella male voices by Noel-Gallon (1891–1927). It is also the second in Marie-Madeleine Duruflé's 6 Fables de La Fontaine for a Capella choir (1960). In Germany, it was Martin Luther's translation (Fabel vom Hahn under der Perle) that was set by Hans Poser as the first of six in Die Fabeln des Äsop for accompanied men's choir (0p. 28, 1956).

== See also ==
- Intrinsic value (ethics)
