= The Taill of Schir Chanticleir and the Foxe =

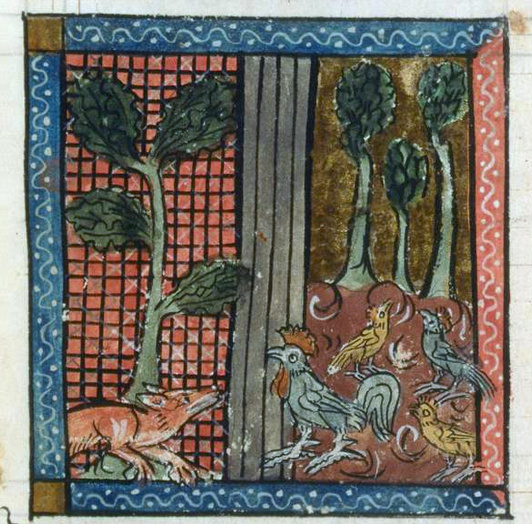
An illumination of the tale from a mediaeval manuscript

"The Taill of Schir Chanticleir and the Foxe" is Fabill 3 of Robert Henryson's cycle of thirteen Morall Fabillis composed in Scotland in the later fifteenth century. It is the first of the fable in the poem to be based on Reynardian and beast epic sources rather than on any strictly Aesopian original, although the closest match from Aesop might be The Dog, the Cock and the Fox. It is a version of Chanticleer and the Fox, a traditional tale of Reynard the Fox.

One of its most direct known sources is Geoffrey Chaucer's Nun's Priest's Tale from the Canterbury Tales written perhaps around ninety years earlier. It might also be argued that Henryson was acquainted with the earlier extended telling of the story in the Reynard cycle. Chanticleir, for example, has three wives, as in the earlier French romance, where Chaucer gives seven to his Chauntecleer.

Henryson's version was probably composed sometime around the 1480s.

== Fable ==
Schir Lowrence, a fox "full sair hungrie," creeps one morning early into the farmyard which neighbours the "thornie schaw of grit defence" which is "his residence." He stalks Chanticleir, a cockerel owned by a poor widow highly dependent on her small flock of hens. Pretending he has come to serve Chanticleir, Lowrence uses flattery to praise the bird's voice and trick him into singing on tiptoe with his eyes closed in the manner, supposedly, of his father who he claims also to have served. So close a friend he was to the bird's father that the tod was present at his death to hald his heid and gif him drinkis warme ... syne [say] the dirigie quhen that he wes deid. This complex web of flattery and highly ambiguous assurance persuades Chanticleir to perform the foolish act, allowing Lowrence swiftly to hint him be the throte and hy with him to the wood.

Hearing the resultant commotion of the flock, the widow discovers the theft and faints. There is then a brief excursus as the three hens in Chanticleir's harem, Pertok, Sprutok and Toppok, deliver rhetorical responses on the loss of their husband. Pertok eulogises the cock and laments his death, but Sprutok counters this with a strong critical condemnation of the cock, advising Pertok simply to forget him now that he is gone; counsel which persuades Pertok to alter her memory of Chanticleir and resolve, before the week is out, to get ane berne (man) suld better claw oure breik (line 529). Finally Toppok, lyke ane curate, preaches a sermon full crous which pronounces the cockerel's destruction as no more than his just and inevitable reward due to his failure to repent his sexual venality.

But Chanticleir is not dead yet. The widow, recovering from her swoon, calls on her troupe of dogs to reskew my nobill cok or he be slane. Chanticleir takes the opportunity of the pursuit of the widow's kennetis (hounds) and Lowrence's physical exhaustion to persuade the fox in mynd (line 556) to turn briefly and assure the dogs that he and the cock are friends. Taken in by this, he opens his mouth to call back enabling Chanticleir to escape into a tree. Lowrence tries a second time to persuade Chanticleir to come to him, but the cock is not fooled twice. Thus Lowrence still goes hungry, while Chanticleir

...over the feildis tuke his flicht
And in at the wedowis lewer couth he licht. (lines 584-5)

What Chanticleir's three wives make of his return is left to the reader's imagination.

== Moralitas ==
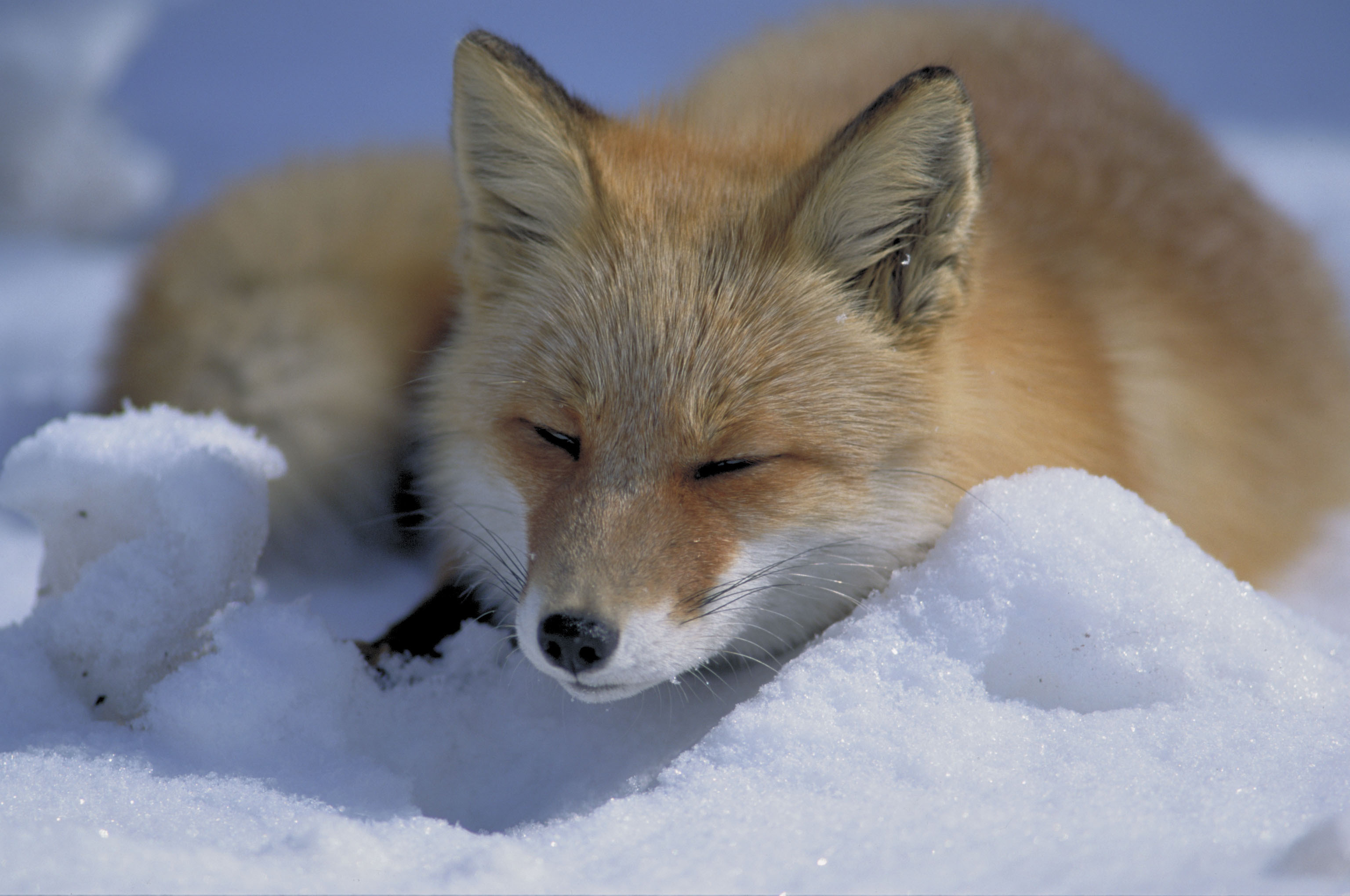
...creip on my wame in froist and snaw... (lines 457-8)

The moralitas opens with an observation that the taill is overheillit wyth typis figurall (replete with symbolic meanings). It focusses, however, on one basic message, the sin of pride and the dangers of flattery, expressed in forceful alliterative verse:

Fy, puft-up pryde ! Thow is full poysonabill !
Quha favoris the on force man haif ane fall:
Thy strenth is nocht, thy stule standis unstabill;
Tak witnes of the feyndis infernall,
Quhilk houndit doun wes fra that hevinlie hall
To hellis hole, and to that hiddeous hous,
Because in pryde thay wer presumpteous...

(lines 593-99)

while the foxe, we are told, may weill represent flatterers

With fals mening and mynd maist toxicate...

(line 602).

Despite the forceful rhetoric, the simplicity of the message is qualified and undercut by the writer's admissions that the full range of readings is more complex. In contrast to the relatively plain statement of the moral to the previous fabill (The Twa Mice) Henryson is starting to complicate his inferences. We are not to take the narrator's moralitates as a complete picture.

== Structure and sources ==
The poem makes a human and existential drama out of a simple act of animal predation and ultimately can only be comic or absurd. The first known example of this narrative idea, exploited for full ironic effect in the genre, is Chaucer's mock heroic Nun's Priest's Tale which Henryson almost certainly used as a source. Chaucer also featured in his poem a long and profoundly comic set of excursuses on dream prediction delivered by the (well-read) victim of the farmyard crime. Henryson's version, which is shorter and more concise, sticks chiefly to the main action but still maintains the complexity of effect which Chaucer demonstrated was possible.

The Talking of the Tod opens with a short general prologue (two stanzas) which highlights the instinct-led nature of creatures in the animal kingdom while acknowledging their enormous diversity.

A similar set of three verse Romulus stories can be identified in the second half of the poem occupying a position that strongly mirrors the first trio in terms of organisation, though the latter three are not manifestly linked in terms of narrative.

== Numbers ==
The fable is 27 stanzas; the moralitas is 4 stanzas:

- 27 + 4 = 31

The action of the fable itself can be further broken down thus:

- Part 1 (stalking Chanticleir) — 14 stanzas (of which Lowrence and Chanticleir's dialogue = 7 stanzas)
- Part 2 (disputation between the hens) — 7 stanzas
- Part 3 (denouement; Chanticleir's escape) — 6 stanzas

== See also ==
- The Parson's Tale

Preceded by The Taill of the Uponlandis Mous and the Burges Mous	The Morall Fabillis by Robert Henryson	Succeeded by The Taill of how this forsaid Tod maid his Confessioun to Freir Wolf Waitskaith
