= The Preiching of the Swallow =

Poem by Robert Henryson

The Preiching of the Swallow, is the eighth poem in the accepted text of Robert Henryson's Middle Scots cycle, The Morall Fabillis of Esope the Phrygian written around the 1480s. Often seen as the most beautiful of the poems in the cycle, it is a very rich expansion of material ultimately derived from Aesop. It is the second of two poems in the cycle which feature the narrator as protagonist in the taill.

Preceded by The Taill of the Lyoun and the Mous	The Morall Fabillis by Robert Henryson	Succeeded by The Taill of the Wolf that gat the Nek-hering throw the wrinkis of the Foxe that begylit the Cadgear
