= The Nun's Priest's Tale =

Part of the Canterbury Tales

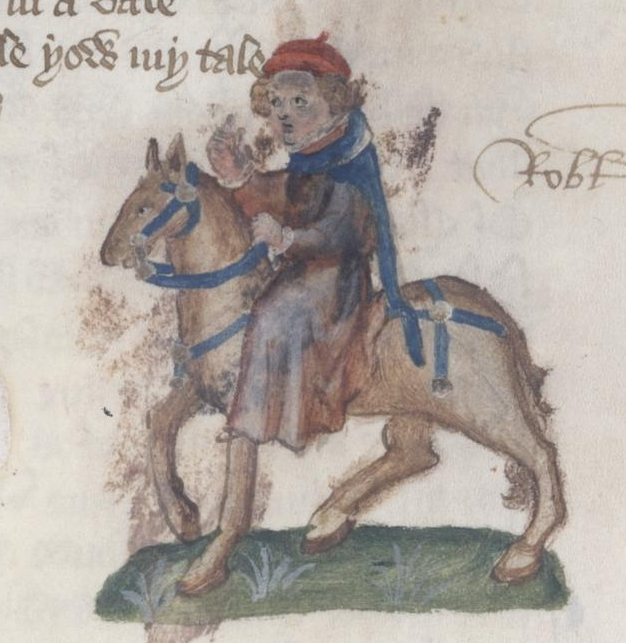
The Nun's Priest, from the Ellesmere Chaucer (15th century)

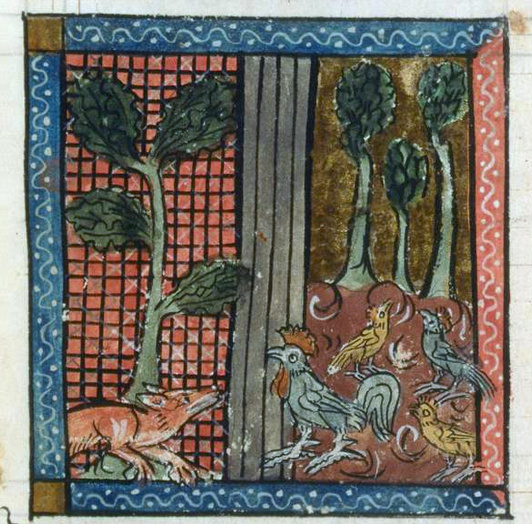
Chanticleer and the Fox in a mediaeval manuscript miniature

"The Nun's Priest's Tale of the Cock and Hen, Chauntecleer and Pertelote" (Middle English: The Nonnes Preestes Tale of the Cok and Hen, Chauntecleer and Pertelote) is a narrative poem and one of The Canterbury Tales by Middle English poet Geoffrey Chaucer. Composed in the 1390s, it is a beast fable and mock epic based on an incident in the Reynard cycle. The story of Chanticleer and the Fox became further popularised in Britain through this means.

== The tale and framing narrative ==
The narrative of 695 lines includes a prologue and an epilogue. The prologue links the story with the previous Monk's Tale, a series of short accounts of toppled despots, criminals and fallen heroes, which prompts an interruption from the knight. The host upholds the knight's complaint and orders the monk to change his story. The monk refuses, saying he has no lust to pleye, and so the Host calls on the Nun's Priest to give the next tale. There is no substantial depiction of this character in Chaucer's "General Prologue", but in the tale's epilogue the Host is moved to give a highly approving portrait which highlights his great physical strength and presence.

The fable concerns a world of talking animals who reflect both human perception and fallacy. Its protagonist is Chauntecleer, a proud cock (rooster) who dreams of his approaching doom in the form of a fox. Frightened, he awakens Pertelote, the chief favourite among his seven wives. She assures him that he only suffers from indigestion and chides him for paying heed to a simple dream. Chauntecleer recounts stories of prophets who foresaw their deaths, dreams that came true, and dreams that were more profound (for instance, Cicero's account of the Dream of Scipio). Chauntecleer is comforted and proceeds to greet a new day. Unfortunately for Chauntecleer, his own dream was also correct. A col-fox, ful of sly iniquitee (line 3,215), who had previously tricked Chauntecleer's father and mother to their downfall, lies in wait for him in a bed of wortes.

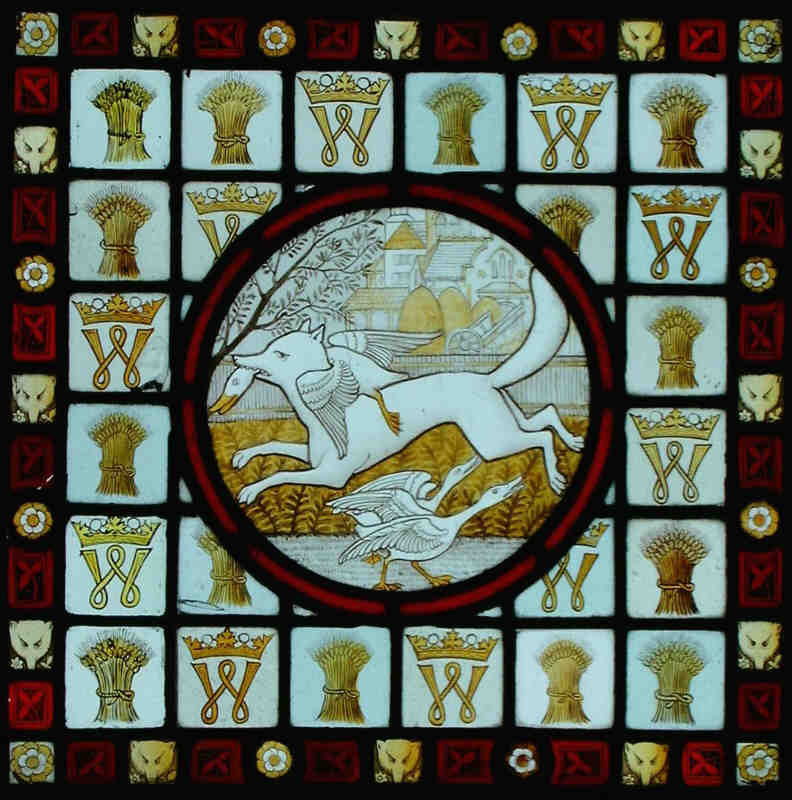
A Victorian stained-glass window by Clement James Heaton

When Chauntecleer spots this daun Russell (line 3,334), the fox plays to his prey's inflated ego and overcomes the cock's instinct to escape by insisting he would love to hear Chauntecleer crow just as his amazing father did, standing on tiptoe with neck outstretched and eyes closed. When the cock does so, he is promptly snatched from the yard in the fox's jaws and slung over his back. As the fox flees through the forest, with the entire barnyard giving chase, the captured Chauntecleer suggests that he should pause to tell his pursuers to give up. The predator's own pride is now his undoing: as the fox opens his mouth to taunt his pursuers, Chauntecleer escapes from his jaws and flies into the nearest tree. The fox tries in vain to convince the wary rooster of his repentance; it now prefers the safety of the tree and refuses to fall for the same trick a second time.

The Nun's Priest is characterised by the way that he elaborates his slender tale with epic parallels drawn from ancient history and chivalry, giving a display of learning which, in the context of the story and its cast, can only be comic and ironic. But in contrast, the description of the poor widow and the chicken yard of her country cottage with which the tale opens is true to life and has been quoted as authentic in discussions of the living conditions of the mediaeval peasant. By way of conclusion, the Nun's Priest goes on to reconcile the sophistication of his courtly performance with the simplicity of the tale within the framing narrative by admonishing the audience to be careful of reckless decisions and of truste on flaterye.

== Adaptations ==
Robert Henryson used Chaucer's tale as a source for his Taill of Schir Chanticleir and the Foxe, the third poem in his Morall Fabillis of Esope the Phrygian, composed in or around the 1480s. Later, the poet John Dryden adapted the tale into more comprehensible modern language under the title of The Cock and the Fox (1700). In 2007, the playwright Dougie Blaxland wrote a comic verse play Chauntecleer and Pertelotte, roughly based on the Nun's Priest's Tale.

Barbara Cooney's adaptation for children with her own illustrations, Chanticleer and the Fox, won the Caldecott Medal in 1959. Another illustrated edition of the tale won the 1992 Kerlan Award. This was Chanticleer and the Fox – A Chaucerian Tale (1991), written by Fulton Roberts with Marc Davis' drawings for a Disney cartoon that was never completed.

Among musical settings have been Gordon Jacob's The Nun's Priest's Tale (1951) and the similarly titled choral setting by Ross Lee Finney. Another American adaptation was Seymour Barab's comic opera Chanticleer. In the UK Michael Hurd set the tale as Rooster Rag, a pop cantata for children (1976).

A full-length musical stage adaptation of The Canterbury Tales, composed of the Prologue, Epilogue, The Nun's Priest's Tale, and four other tales, was presented at the Phoenix Theatre, London on 21 March 1968, with music by Richard Hill and John Hawkins, lyrics by Nevill Coghill, and original concept, book, and direction by Martin Starkie. The Nun's Priest's Tale section was excluded from the original 1969 Broadway production, though reinstated in the 1970 U.S. tour.

== See also ==
- Chanticleer and the Fox
- The Book of the Dun Cow

== Notes ==
General

- Goodall, Peter; Greentree, Rosemary; Bright, Christopher, eds. (2009). Chaucer's Monk's Tale and Nun's Priest's Tale : An Annotated Bibliography 1900 to 2000. annotated by Geoffrey Cooper... et al. Toronto: University of Toronto Press. ISBN 978-0-80209-320-2.

Specific
