= The Taill of the Uponlandis Mous and the Burges Mous =

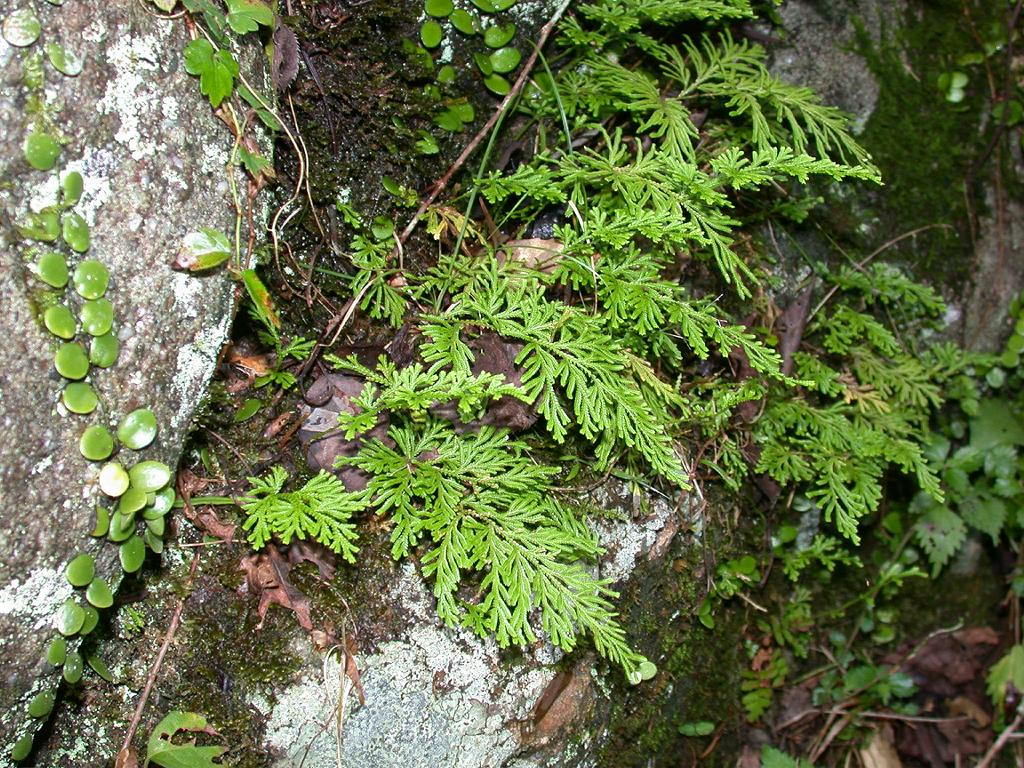
Off fog and farne full febilie wes maid... (line 198)

"The Taill of the Uponlandis Mous and the Burges Mous", also known as "The Twa Mice," is a Middle Scots adaptation of Aesop's Fable The Town Mouse and the Country Mouse by the Scottish poet Robert Henryson. Written around the 1480s, it is the second poem in Henryson's collection called The Morall Fabillis of Esope the Phrygian.

Hennryson's Fabill treats its characters and incidents with a realism that was hitherto unusual in the genre. Its ambiguous portrayal of the two protagonists seamlessly blends their animal and human characteristics in a way that allowed the makar to satirise new social classes in the rising burous touns of his day with subtle and philosophical irony.

== Plot ==
The original fable plot is very simple. A town mouse visits a country cousin and is unimpressed at the poor quality of the fare. The town mouse invites the cousin back to her town house where the feasting is better. In town it is true that the food is better, more plentiful and very readily available, but the creatures are twice interrupted by inhabitants of the house. The country mouse does not stay to experience a third upset but returns home where the simple food can be enjoyed in peace.

Henryson's second fabill is highly faithful to Aesop's basic structure. His expansion creates fully fleshed scenes from each of the elements and heightens the drama in a number of different ways while remaining essentially concise.

Mous in Scots is pronounced with a short "oo" vowel, and Henryson's 15th-century spelling of the plural is myis.

== Fabill ==
Henryson's fabill describes the two mice as sisteris and presents the difference in their lifestyles using human and economic terms that lend them ambiguous overtones. The Uponlandis Mous survives with difficulty like an owtlaw living on uther mennis skaith (lit. harm, in the sense of toil, suggesting the corn planted by farmers) and going hungry in winter. By contrast, the Burges Mous in town has it easy and lives a privileged life like a gild brother able to move freely all year but custum mair or les (i.e. without paying tax) among the cheis in ark and meill in kist. Just as Henryson blurs animal and human characteristics he also blurs the gender of the mice.

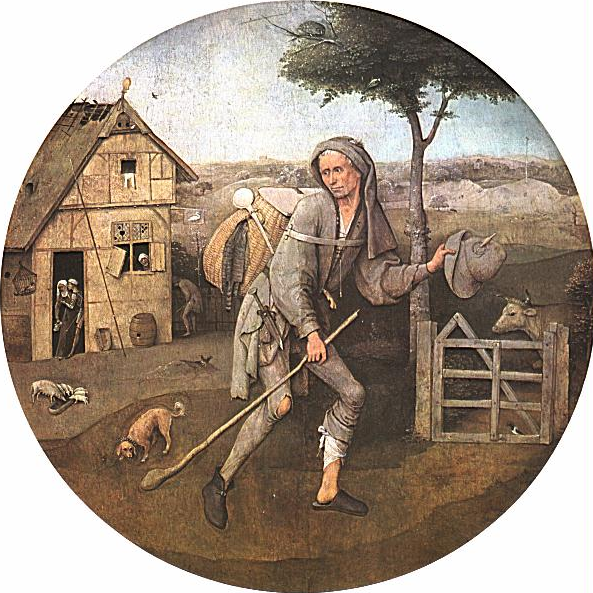
Hieronymus Bosch, "The wayfarer."

The taill features pictures of the mice travelling outside the city. When the Burges Mous decides to look for her sister, she sets out barefute, allone, with pykestaf in hir hand/ as pure pylgryme, and the image is of a lost figure in rugged terrain of uncertain vastness. Their journey back to town even has unlawful overtones (though quite natural for a mouse) as the pair sleep by day and move by night as if in violation of a curfew.

The fabill has two main scenes. The first is set in the sober wane of the Uponlandis Mous, described as a frail dwelling of moss and fern set under a steidfast stane. It features some highly believable dialogue as the two sisters fall out over the quality of the hospitality and is only eight stanzas long.

The second scene, with equally swiftly described action, takes place in a spence with vittell grit plentie (a well-stocked pantry) in a town house described as being not fer fra thyne (lit. not far from your place). The first figure to interrupt their feast is the spencer. Henryson departs from Aesop's original by allowing only the Burges Mous a hole in which to escape. Her sister, finding nowhere to go, lies flatlings on the ground in terror.

Visitation number two is a much more frightening development for the mice. After the spencer passes, the Burges persuades her reluctant sister to return to the burde, but

scantlie had thay drunkin anis or twyse
Quhen in come Gib Hunter, oure jolie cat...

(lines 325-6)

This time the Uponlandis Mous is lucky to escape with her life. After much cruel handling from the cat, she manages to win free only by climbing up between ane parraling and the wall. After the cat has gone, the mous decries her sister's lifestyle and returns home.

Quhen scho wes furth and fre, scho wes ful fane,
And merilie markit unto the mure.

(Lines 355-6)

The fabill has a happy ending, but is qualified. The narrator reports in the final stanza only the rumour he has heard that the Uponlandis Mous lived happily ever after.

== Moralitas ==
The second moralitas in the cycle is a short, beautifully composed paean to the virtues of self-sufficiency and self-control summed up in the line, Quha hes aneuch, of na mair hes he neid, a philosophy commonly expressed in many religions and cultures, most especially Daoism. The moralitas is one of the most straightforward and self-contained in Henryson's Morall Fabillis and is manifestly in harmony with the preceding taill (not always the case elsewhere).

Henryson to some degree highlights the second moralitas as standing a little apart from the rest of the poem by composing its four stanzas in ballade form (the first of only two brief departures from rhyme royal in the cycle overall) while nevertheless simultaneously underlining the close link to the story by using a chain of rhyme that runs from the end of the taill into the beginning of the moralitas. Despite employing conventional moral expressions and warnings, the ultimate effect is surprisingly moving.

The first word addresses the audience in intimate and familiar terms as friendis (pronounced in Scots with a short "ee" vowel).

== Meit ==
The Uponlandis Mous and the Burges Mous contains several references to meit (food) eaten by the mice. Comparisons of the bill of fare between the two locales (town and country) reveal differences.

The simple (generally unprocessed) foods associated with the rural existence are:

- corne
- quheit
- ry
- nuttis
- peis,
- watter caill (as soup)
- benis

This list ends with candill instead of spyce (perhaps also involving a pun with Scots cannel).

The foods associated with the urban setting, on the other hand, are effectively household produce:

- cheis
- butter
- flesche
- fische baith fresche and salt
- grotis
- meill
- malt
- muttoun
- beif
- thraff caikkis
- mane full fyne insteid of geill

Once again, the list is completed with quhyte candill to gust thair mouth withall.

The Uponlandis Mous refers to the seithing of ane kow (pronounced coo) (line 235) as an illustration of excess, while the Burges Mous rather gallusly invokes Christian dietary codes when she boasts, My Gude Friday is better nor your Pace (line 248). The Uponlandis Mous ultimately complains of the urban fare, Thy guse is gude, thy gansell sour as gall (line 345) and the narrator in the moralitas refers to fitches and seid (line 367).

One point of equivalence in dietary matters between the two scenes is the reference in both to candlewax as the condiment the mice use (instead of spice) to add gust or "flavour" to their meals, while on the matter of drink, Henryson makes a special point that the mice drink the watter cleir/ insteid of wyne (lines 272-3).

== Extract ==
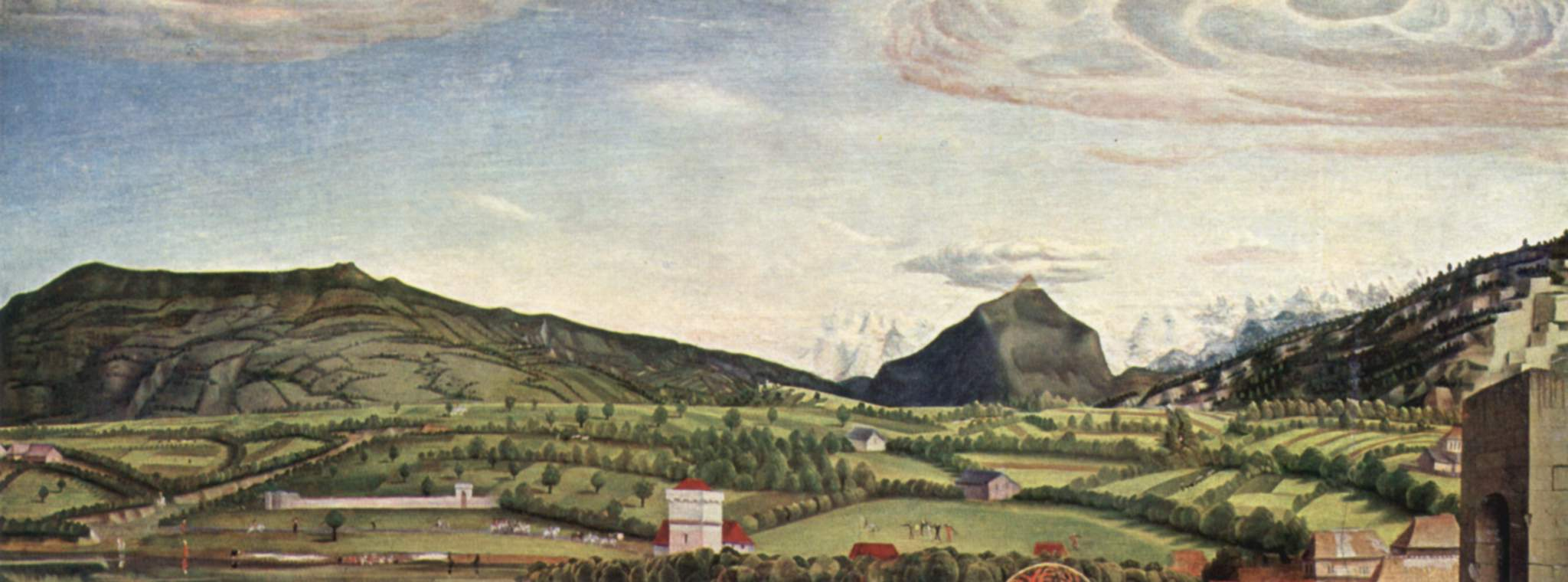
Konrad Witz. Landscape painted in 1444 (detail)

When the Burges Mous ventures forth to seek her rural cousin beyond the confines of city, the picture of her as a figure in a landscape (created in a very few words) produces a highly ambiguous sense of scale:

Furth mony wilsum wayis can scho walk:
Throw mosse and mure, throw bankis, busk and breir,
Fra fur to fur, cryand fra balk to balk:
"Cum furth to me, my awin sister deir,
Cry peip anis!"...

- Listen: Audio (UK) [Link under construction.]

== See also ==
- municipality
- banquet
- fasting
- Lent

Preceded by The Taill of the Cok and the Jasp	The Morall Fabillis by Robert Henryson	Succeeded by The Taill of Schir Chanticleir and the Foxe
