= The Cock and the Jasp =

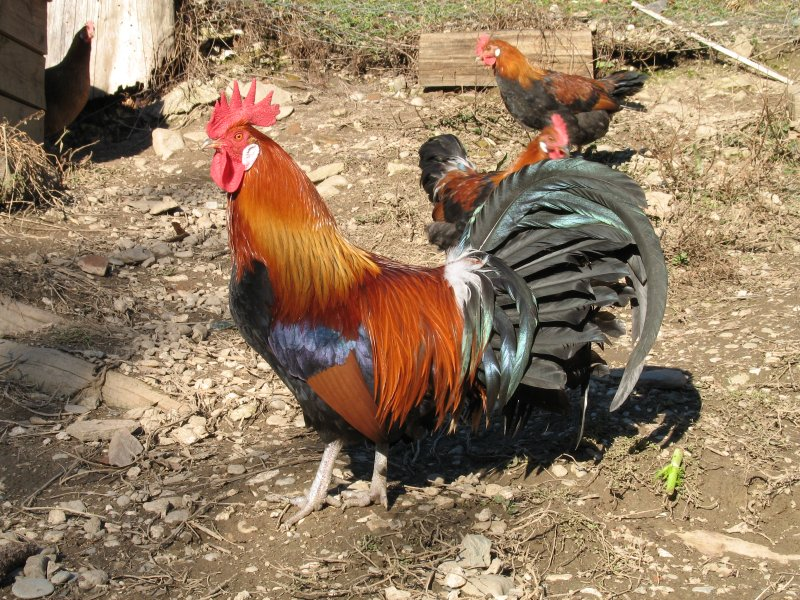

"The Taill of the Cok and the Jasp" is a Middle Scots version of Aesop's Fable The Cock and the Jewel by the 15th-century Scottish poet Robert Henryson. It is the first in Henryson's collection known as the Morall Fabillis of Esope the Phrygian. The Cok and the Jasp is framed by a prologue and a moralitas, and as the first poem in the collection it operates on a number of levels, and in all its parts, to introduce the larger cycle.

== Sources ==
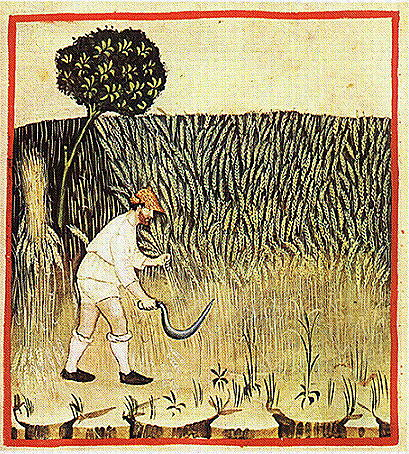
Grain gathering in the 14th century

Although the Aesopian tale of The Cock and the Jewel, which Henryson re-tells, is typically simple, it is one of the most ambiguous in the fable canon. It presents what is, in effect, a riddle on relative values with almost the force of a kōan. One modern translation of the fable, in its most cogent form, runs thus:

A Cock, scratching the ground for something to eat, turned up a Jewel that had by chance been dropped there. "Ho!" said he, "a fine thing you are, no doubt, and, had your owner found you, great would his joy have been. But for me ! give me a single grain of corn before all the jewels in the world."

Aesop's Fables, translated by V.S. Vernon Jones (1912)

The standard medieval interpretation of the fable, however (which Henryson follows) came down firmly against the cockerel on the grounds that the jewel represents wisdom rather than mere wealth or allure. This interpretation is expressed in the verse Romulus, the standard fable text across Europe in that era, written in the lingua franca, Latin.

Henryson tacitly acknowledges this "source" in his own expanded version by claiming to be making a "translatioun" from the Latin and directly quoting some of its lines. The Romulus was a standard classroom text used in primary education to teach Latin. Since The Cock and the Jewel (De Gallo et Jaspide) was the first fable in this standard collection, it was, de facto, a universally familiar text in literary consciousness throughout Europe.

== Prologue ==
There is little doubt that the succinct prolog which leads into the Cok and the Jasp is intended to introduce a general collection of Fabillis, not solely the Fabill of the Cok and the Jasp. It opens with a defense of poetry (expanded from the verse Romulus), presents an apologia for making the translatioun, establishes the first person narrator, summarises Aesop's work and provides a bridging passage into the First Fabill.

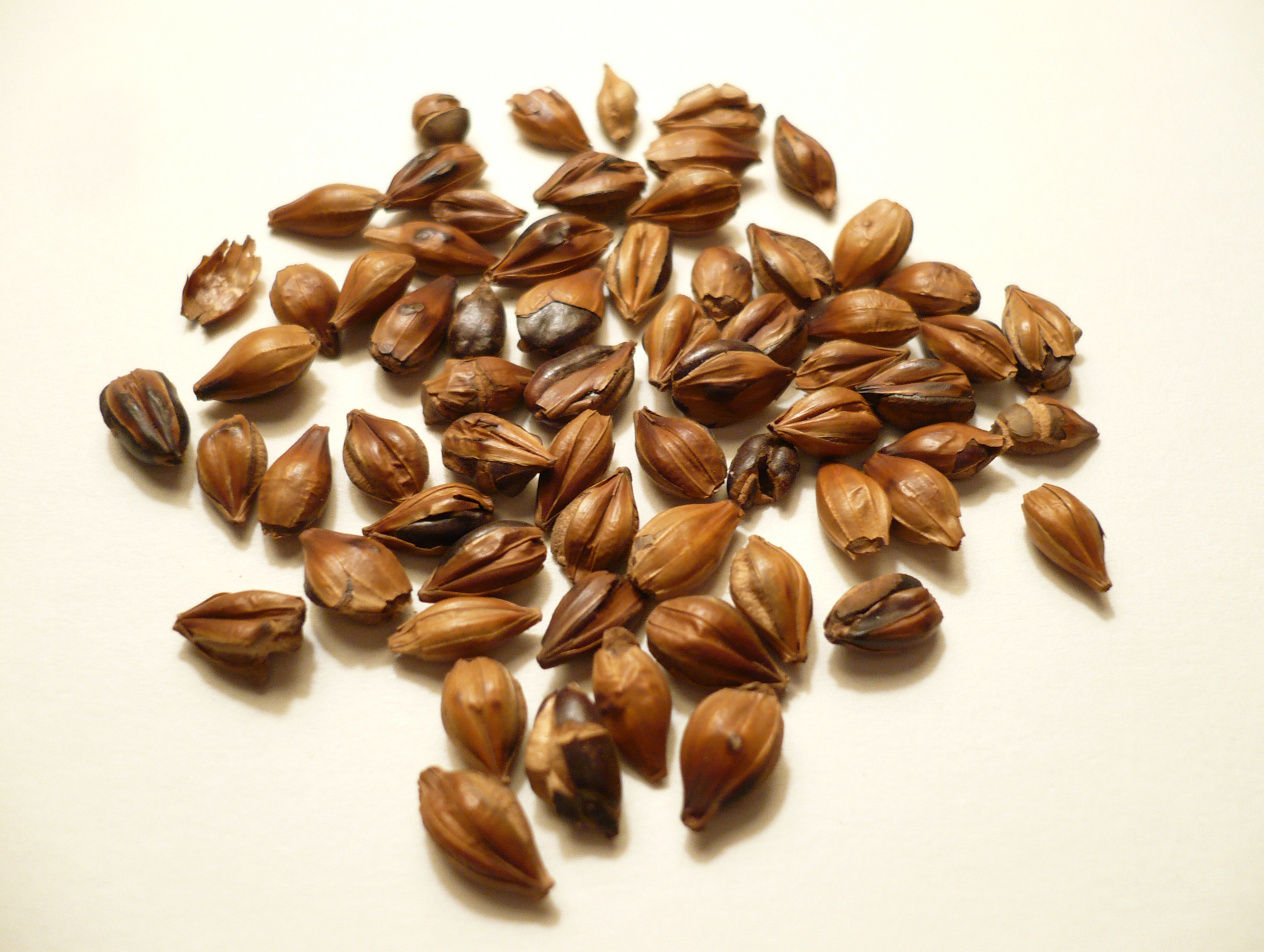

The first four stanzas develop a general argument that fiction, even though it may be feinyeit by nature, can have a sound moral purpose at heart, and that stories which are pleisand (line 4) or merie (line 20) are better suited to convey wisdom than dry scholastic writing. Henryson develops his meaning using three images; cereal cultivation (stanza 2), the nuttis schell (stanza 3) and the bowstring (stanza 4).

In stanza 5 (the middle stanza of the prolog) the narrator identifies and directly addresses his audience for the first time as my maisteris, or in other words, his own university educated peers. The writer, in effect, is figuring himself in the role of student before his teachers (his readers). The stanza also makes cryptic reference to an unnamed commissioning patron for the poem who may or may not have existed.

The humility topos continues into the next stanza where the narrator pretends to have no understanding of eloquence and an ability only to write in rude and hamelie language, a self-deferential reference to his choice to create poetry in Scots rather than Latin. He concludes by inviting his readers to correct any mistakes they may find.

A brief precis of Aesop's fable literature then follows in the next three stanzas with a stark view of its purposes and some comments on how animal behaviour and human nature compare. The ninth stanza ends with a swift bridging passage into the first Fabill.

== Fable ==
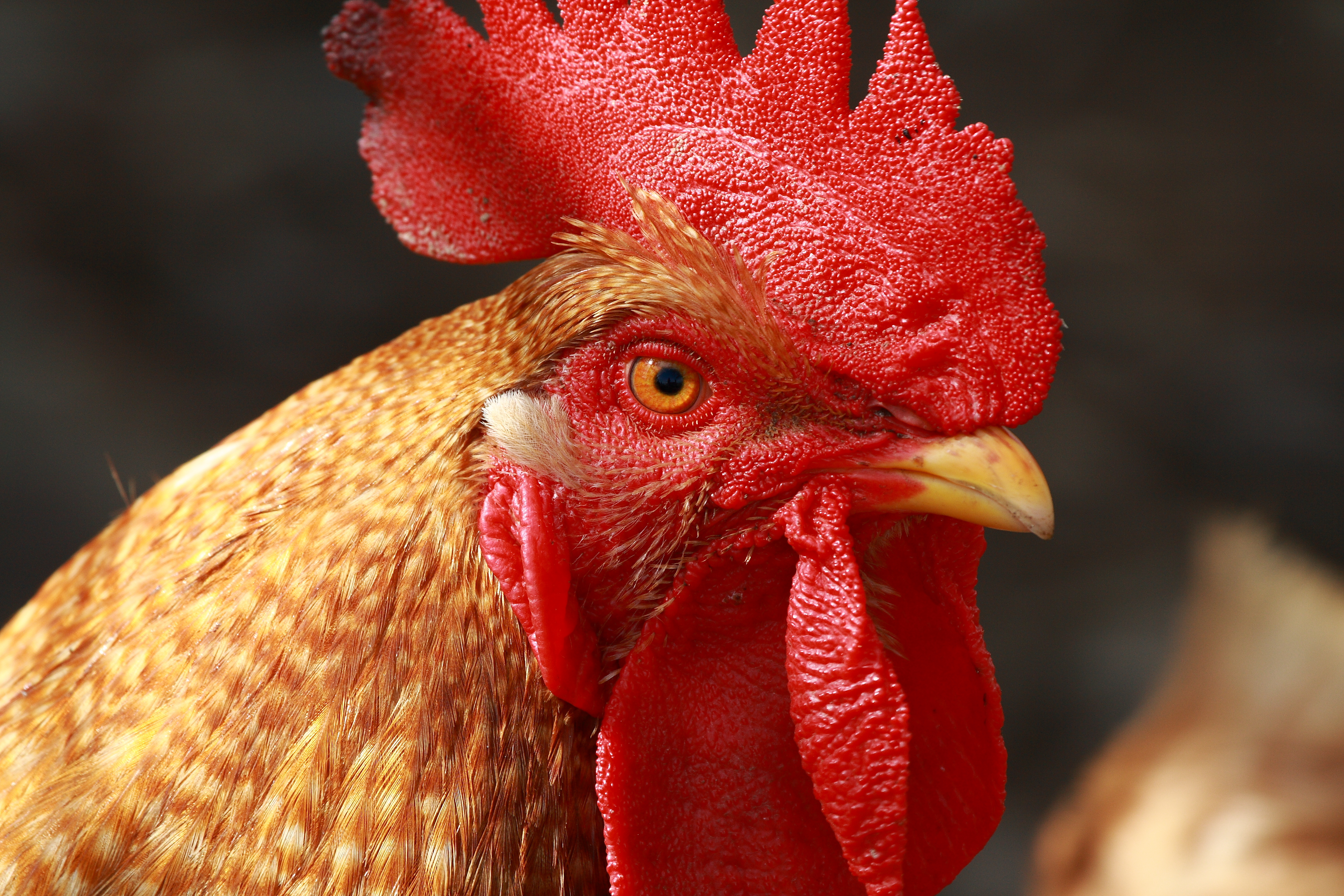

Of all the thirteen taillis, the Cok and the Jasp most pretends to be like the static and conventional re-tellings more usual in fable genre. Henryson's innovation and development from his sources chiefly involve presenting an unusually well-rounded, imaginatively realised figure of the cok in a specific and concretely drawn setting. He establishes explicit reasons for the loss of the jasp and sets the location for its discovery as a midden. He also expands the cockerel's arguments and ultimate reasons for the rejection of the jasp as a carefully orchestrated passage of fully fleshed oration which nonetheless continues to sound as if it is being delivered in the voice of a cockerel. But since this is not so much a story — more a strongly drawn vignette — the fabill does not yet fully live up to the requirements for fully effective storytelling argued for in the prolog. This will come in the subsequent fabillis, and so, in a sense, the First Fabill partly acts to defer reader's expectations.

The cok addresses the stone directly, acknowledges its worth, recognises it has been misplaced and argues, realistically enough, that to him it is of no practical use. The jasp, he says, is an object that belongs more properly to a lord or king (line 81), while he is content simply to satisfy his humble wants in draf, corn, wormis and snaillis — his daily meit. The rhetorical climax comes in the seventh stanza of the fabill in which the cok, rising on a number of rhetorical questions, finishes with an almost fantastical exortation for the stone to levitate and transport itself back to some more royal place:

Quhar suld thow mak thy habitatioun?
Quhar suld thow duell bot in ane royall tour?
Quhar suld thow sit bot on ane kingis croun,
Exaltit in worschip and in grit honour?
Rise gentill jasp, of all stanis the flour
Out of this midding, and pas quhar thow suld be;
Thow ganis not for me, nor I for the.

(M.F. lines 106-112)

And the cock, leaving the jasp, exits the poem to seek his meit (line 114).

== Moralitas ==
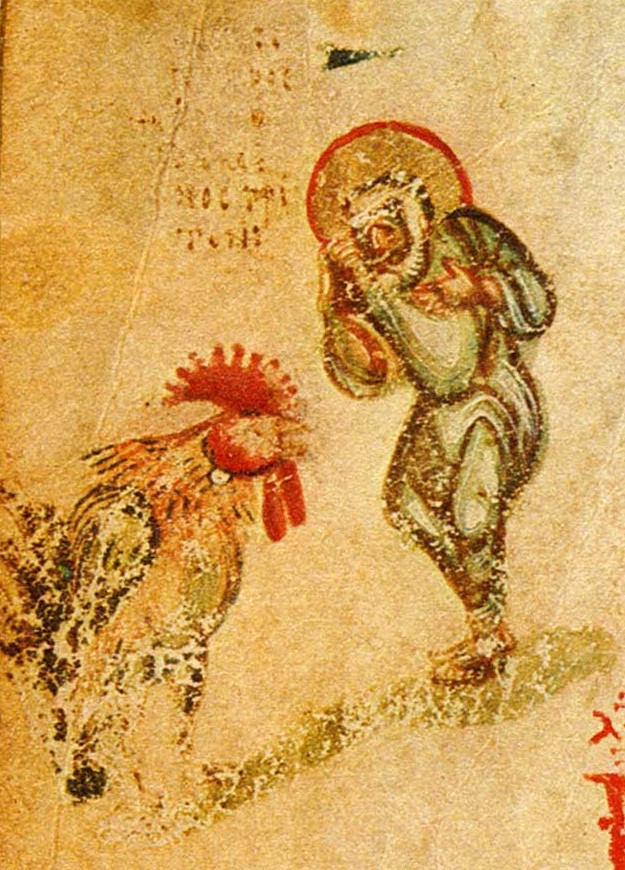
St Peter and the Cock.

The poet immediately follows the taill with a moralitas. This was a common device in medieval and renaissance fable literature, and its use here establishes the convention that Henryson will employ consistently through all thirteen of the Morall Fabillis.

In this case, however, before the Moralitas properly begins, stanza 18 (the ninth stanza of the fabill) as a footnote to the taill, intercedes with a compressed account of the qualities of the jasp, including its protective properties, which almost instantly casts doubt on the wisdom of the cock's decision. For example, lines 125-6:

Quha hes this stane sall have gude hap to speid,
Of fyre nor water him neidis not to dreid.

In a sense, stanza 18 presents a new riddle and, to be answered, requires the cock's argument to be turned.

The Moralitas proper is usually given to begin after stanza 18 in most textual witnesses except Bannatyne. Its five stanzas come down explicitly against the cock and so, by implication, present a conceit of closure on Aesop's more open and enigmatic original. The narrator minces no words in expressing how serious the cockerel's error has been in rejecting the stone because, he says, the jasp represents science, in the sense of wisdom, which he defines in terms that bring it close in meaning to concepts like dharma. In the final stanza he laments mankind's general failure to respect and comprehend these values:

Bot now, allace, this jasp is tynt and hid;
We seik it nocht, nor preis it for to find…

He closes, with pretended indifference, by advising the reader, if he so wishes, to go seek the jasp where it lies.

== Themes ==
Heraldic cockerel with grain

Henryson's expansion of Aesop's fable makes its inferences concrete, introduces complexity and raises a large number of themes in a very short space. In relation to other known fable literature in Europe up to that time, the loading is extremely rich.

Even though the moralitas comes down sincerely and emphatically on the side of the rejected stone, nevertheless, the cockerel has raised questions that are not necessarily easily resolved. The subsequent poems will appear to further intensify many of those doubts and dichotomies rather than resolving them. Therefore, the riddling aspect to the Aesopian original is, in some regards, not ultimately overturned and is arguably maintained as part of the fabric of the poem.

Among the specific issues touched on or implied in Henryson's expansion are questions of fiction and truth, appetite, self-interest, fecklessness, materialism, duty, wisdom, hierarchy, equality, education, social order, government, the nature of aristocracy, the nature of royalty and many others. There is also the question of who the cockerel ultimately represents and whether, in some sense, Henryson's poem itself is ultimately the jasp which the reader has encountered "in the midden" to take or leave as he or she wishes.

== Opening lines ==
It is worth noting that the opening of Henryson's Prolog to the Morall Fabillis echoes the opening lines of John Barbour's Brus. It is therefore a variation on the theme of the relation between truth and report in literature. For comparison, the first ten lines, of The Brus, composed in the 1370s, run:

Storyss to rede ar delitibill
Suppos that thai be nocht but fabill,
Than suld storys that suthfast wer
And thai war said on gud maner
Have doubill plesance in heryng.
the first plesance is the carpyng,
And the tother the suthfastnes
That shawys the thing rycht as it wes,
And suth thyngis that ar likand
Till mannys heryng ar plesand.

(Barbour, The Brus, lines 1-10)

Henryson's first stanza, written just over a century later, uses a number of the same (or similar) terms, but, in shorter space, generates a slightly less sanguine impression of the relation between narrative, audience and subject. The differences are subtle, but distinct:

Thocht feinyit fabillis of ald poetre
Be not al grunded upon truth, yit than
Thair polite termes of sweit rhetore
Richt plesand ar unto the eir of man;
And als the caus that thay first began
Wes to repreif the haill misleving
Off man be figure of ane uther thing.

(Henryson, Morall Fabillis, lines 1-7)

== Numbers ==
The first fabill, in all its three parts, occupies 23 stanzas, distributed 9—9—5.

- Prolog: 9 stanzas
- Fabill: 9 stanzas, including stanza 18 on the properties of the jasp (see above).
- Moralitas: 5 stanzas

Because of the ambiguity of the status of stanza 18 (as in a sense a second "mini" moralitas) the count could be interpreted as

- 9—8—6,

or even perhaps,

- 9—8—1—5.

== Notes and references ==
Preceded by -	The Morall Fabillis by Robert Henryson	Succeeded by The Taill of the Uponlandis Mous and the Burges Mous
