= Contingencies of Value =

1988 book by Barbara Herrnstein Smith

Contingencies of Value: Alternative Perspectives for Critical Theory
- Cover of the first edition
- Author: Barbara Herrnstein Smith
- Language: English
- Subject: Literary criticism
- Publication date: 1988
- Publication place: United States
- Media type: Print
- ISBN: 9780674167865

Contingencies of Value: Alternative Perspectives for Critical Theory is a 1988 book by literary critic and professor Barbara Herrnstein Smith. In the book, she presents a relativistic theory of value, contending that value emerges from a dynamic process of changing and interacting variables.

== Overview ==
Smith's view of value is radically relativistic. She contends that "all value is radically contingent, being neither a fixed attribute, an inherent quality, or an objective property of things but, rather, an effect of multiple continuously changing, and continuously interacting variables." She considers value to be the "product of the dynamics of a system, specifically an economic system."

== Reception ==
Contingencies of Value received generally positive views in scholarly periodicals, with some reviewers expressing misgivings about gaps and weaknesses in Smith's argument for a radically relativist theory of value.

Christopher J. Knight, writing in the Journal of Value Inquiry, summed up Smith's project in Contingencies of Value as follows: "Smith, believing that critics have wrongly framed the question of artistic value, turns away from them and toward anthropologists, critical theorists, linguists, philosophers, physicists, sociologists, etc., hoping to broaden her understanding of just what it is that determines 'aesthetic' value. For the point is, in Smith's view, that the whole question of aesthetic value—what has it, what doesn't—is decidedly problematic."

William E. Cain, reviewing Contingencies of Value for Philosophy and Literature, had high praise for the book:

Barbara Herrnstein Smith's book is a powerfully argued, highly suggestive analysis of the concept of "value" in literary study and cultural commentary and critique. Smith presents a compelling case for the "radical contingency" of value and keenly describes the complex systems within which value judgments take shape, exist, and circulate. She displays a formidable command of difficult, dense philosophical issues and controversies, and her distinguished work in reviewing, elaborating upon, and re-articulating them forcefully challenges both conservative scholars who adhere to notions of "transcendent" value and radical theorists who urge that we see all value judgments as mere expressions of class, race, and gender bias.

Jeffrey L. Geller reviewed the book for Philosophy & Rhetoric, and described Smith's position as placing her at the extremes of relativism: "By starting and finishing with a conception that assimilates language to action, Smith takes a place, if not a position, in the American pragmatist camp. Connor refers to Smith's exposition in Contingencies as a defense of the 'radical-pragmatist' case. Whereas Rorty is usually considered the pragmatist provocateur par excellence, we have seen that Smith consistently outflanks Rorty, earning Contingencies the distinction of being a 'more-relativist-than-Rorty' argument.

Two critics, Meili Steele and Martin Mueller, criticized Smith's argument for not accounting for the source of her own vocabulary and for not acknowledging how certain value judgments would have nearly universal agreement.

Meili Steele, in Comparative Literature, wrote that "Barbara Smith's book uses a functional/systemic model drawn from sociology to examine axiological theories of the past and present. Her thesis is that 'all value is radically contingent, being neither a fixed attribute, an inherent quality, or an objective property of things but, rather, an effect of multiple continuously changing, and continuously interacting variables'—that is, value is the 'product of the dynamics of a system, specifically an economic system.'"

Steele went on to zero in on this flaw in Smith's argument: "If she adopts the therapeutic goal of Wittgenstein and Rorty that seeks to rid us of obfuscatory vocabularies, she offers no justification for her vocabulary, no metatheoretical argument against competing nonfoundationalist problematics. Such a gap would not be a serious problem if the book were not so contentiously aimed at exposing others' views."

Martin Mueller, reviewing the book in Salmagundi, pointed to what he found as a weakness in her account of value: "There may be practical virtue in the amiable hypocrisy of a conceptual style that never asserts the ultimate principles by which it is guided. But a theory may be at fault for claiming too little or too much, and it is clearly a weakness of Smith's account of moral life that she refuses to articulate, or even denies the existence of, rules whose violation in many cases would be noted with universal, or nearly universal, agreement."

== See also ==
- Contingency, Irony, and Solidarity
- Relativism

== Sources ==
- Cain, William E. (1 October 1989). "Review of Contingencies of Value: Alternative Perspectives for Critical Theory by Barbara Herrnstein Smith". Philosophy and Literature. 13 (2): 376–378. doi:10.1353/phl.1989.0024. S2CID 143975776.
- Geller, Jeffrey L. (1997). "The Stalemate of Reason: Barbara Herrnstein Smith on the Problems of Circularity and Self-Contradiction". Philosophy and Rhetoric. 30 (4): 376–394. JSTOR 40237966.
- Knight, Christopher J. (1987). "Smith, Stein, Picasso—and the Contingency of Value". Journal of Value Inquiry. 21 (3): 217–224. doi:10.1007/BF00140363. S2CID 170530837.
- Mueller, Martin (Fall 1990). "Endurance and Contingency". Salmagundi (88/89): 435–454. JSTOR 40548502.
- Smith, Barbara Herrnstein (1991). Contingencies of Value: Alternative Perspectives for Critical Theory. Cambridge: Harvard University Press. ISBN 9780674167865.
- Steele, Meili (Winter 1992). "Review of Contingencies of Value: Alternative Perspectives for Critical Theory by Barbara Herrnstein Smith". Comparative Literature. 44 (1): 105–108. doi:10.2307/1771185. JSTOR 1771185.
