= Poetic closure =

Linguistic device

Poetic closure is the sense of conclusion given at the end of a poem. Barbara Herrnstein Smith's detailed study—Poetic Closure: A Study of How Poems End—explores various techniques for achieving closure. One of the most common techniques is setting up a regular pattern and then breaking it to mark the end of a poem. Another technique is to refer to subject matter that in itself provides a sense of closure: death is the clearest example of this.
