= Poetic Closure =

Book by Barbara Herrnstein Smith

Poetic Closure: A Study of How Poems End
- Title page for Poetic Closure: A Study of How Poems End (1968)
- Author: Barbara Herrnstein Smith
- Language: English
- Genre: Non-fiction
- Publisher: University of Chicago Press
- Publication date: 1968
- Publication place: United States
- ISBN: 0-226-76343-9

Poetic Closure: A Study of How Poems End — ISBN 0-226-76343-9 — is a book by Barbara Herrnstein Smith, which was published by the University of Chicago Press in 1968. The division between form and content in the way the book is structured has been criticized.

== Structure of the book ==
The book addresses the following topics:

- Formal Structure
- Thematic Structure
- Special Terminal Features
- Problems of Closure

== Structural closure ==
Herrnstein Smith observes that regularity — such as the regular repetition of lines of iambic tetrameter — builds the expectation of continuance, and the desire for closure. Examples of how a sense of closure may be achieved include:

- breaking the regularity of the repetition as in the final alexandrine of the Spenserian stanza
- returning to the norm after a brief departure from it; Herrnstein Brown offers Robert Herrick's brief lyric 'I dare not ask a kisse' as an example.

Wyatt's practice of varying the final repetition of a refrain — as in the poem 'Forget not yet' — is cited as an example of the first kind.

Other examples of closure brought about by structural means include: where the last stanza repeats (or closely echoes) the first stanza, thereby 'framing' the entire poem (such as in Wyatt's 'My Lute Awake!'); where enjambent is used in blank verse, and only at the close does a line end correspond to a full stop (the example given is from the conclusion of Book XI of Paradise Lost).

== Notes ==
1. Morse Peckham in Genre, V (1972) page 63), see also Ernst Häublein, The Stanza, (The Critical Idiom), Methuen 1978. ISBN 0-416-84610-6, page 55.
