= Heinrich Steinhöwel =

German doctor, humanist, translator

Heinrich Steinhöwel, alternatively Steinhäuel or Steinheil (1410/1411 – 1 March 1479) was a German doctor, humanist, translator and writer. From 1450 he settled in Ulm, from which most of his works were published.

== Life and work ==
According to recent research, Steinhöwel was born in 1410 or 1411 in Weil der Stadt and went to study medicine at the University of Vienna from 1429 to 1436. He continued his education at the University of Padua from 1438, where he began by studying canon law, transferring later to receive his doctorate in medicine in 1443. From 1444 he taught medicine at the University of Heidelberg, going on to practice as a doctor in his hometown of Weil in 1446, then in 1449 in Esslingen am Neckar.

In 1450 Steinhöwel was appointed city physician of Ulm, initially for six years and then with an extended contract, and was also granted a pharmacy connection there. Later he authored a small work on the treatment of plague, Das Büchlein der Ordnung der Pestilenz (1473), the first on its subject in German, which went through four reprints before the end of the century. He was also consulted medically by various princes, including Eberhard I, Duke of Württemberg and Philip the Good, Duke of Burgundy.

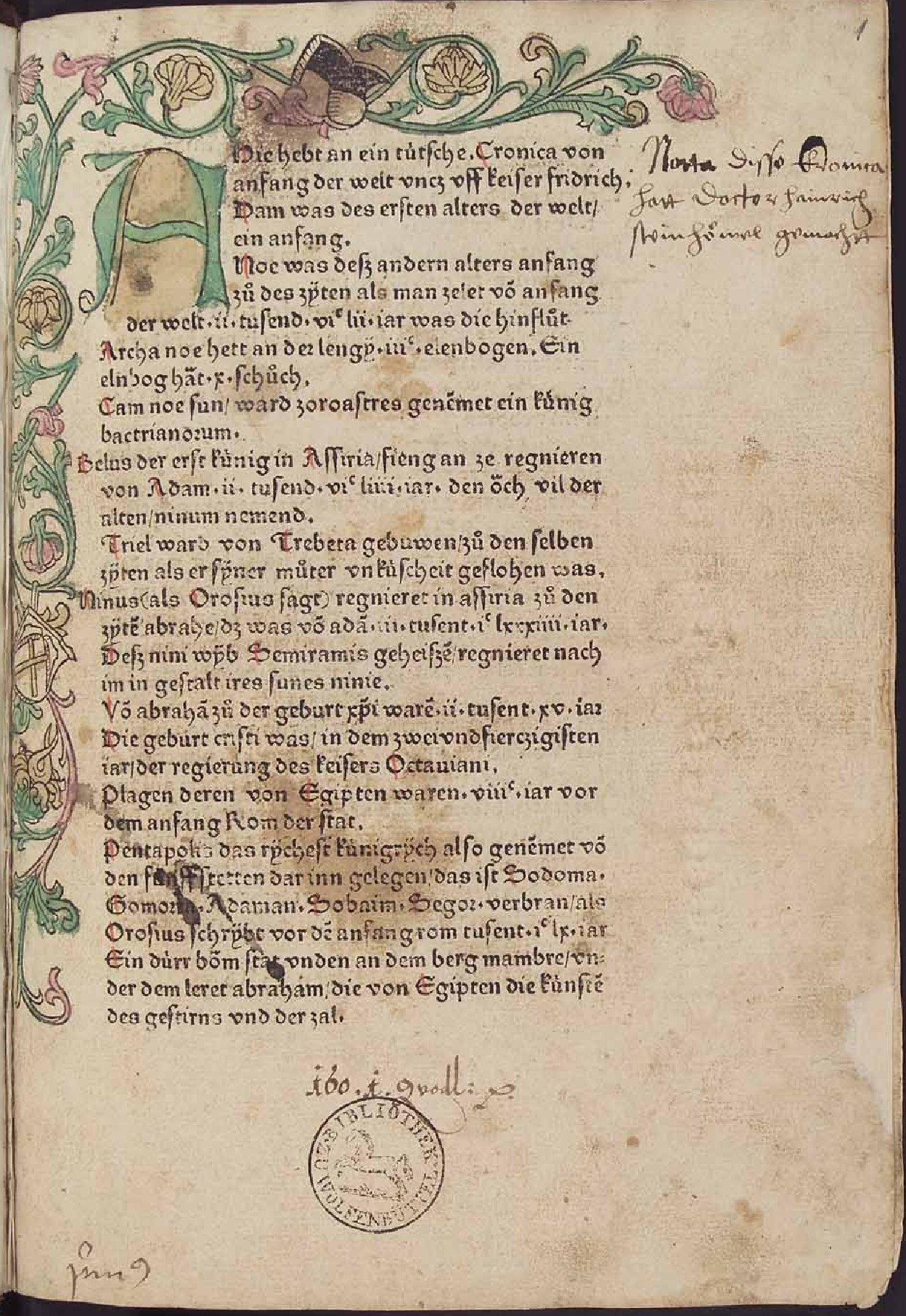
A page from Steinhöwel’s 1473 Tütsche Cronica ('German Chronicle')

Steinhöwel brought Johann Zainer, the brother of his Augsburg printer to Ulm, where he set up what was probably the first printing press in 1472 with Steinhöwel's financial support. In 1473, a Latin and soon afterwards a German translation of Giovanni Boccaccio's De claris mulieribus ('Famous Women') was published, both of them with numerous high-quality woodcuts, as well as Steinhöwel's Tütsche Cronica ('German Chronicle').

Steinhöwel lived during the transition period from the Late Middle Ages to the Renaissance, when there was growing interest in classical Roman and Greek culture. After settling in Ulm, he was at the centre of a circle of humanistically minded men in Swabia and also worked as a translator from Latin and editor of ancient texts. Among such works was his metrical adaptation of the ancient novel Apollonius of Tyre, as well as works by Petrarch.

Around 1476, Steinhöwel published his famous and influential bilingual collection of Aesop's Fables, with the Latin text in verse accompanied by a German prose translation. The 550-page work contains 191 woodcuts and numerous decorative initials. The collection was also accompanied by a biography of Aesop and stories by Petrus Alphonsus and Poggio Bracciolini. Very soon after, translations or adaptations followed in Italian (1479), French (1480), English (the Caxton edition of 1484), Czech (about 1488) and Spanish (1489).

Steinhöwel exerted a great influence on the development of a sophisticated German written language through his relatively free translations from Latin into German. Statements about his principles of translation, published in the introductions to his works, are among the early Renaissance theoretical considerations of the problem of translation and thus implicitly of cultural transfer.

He died in Ulm in 1479.

== See also ==
- Aesopus Fabulae, the 1481 edition on Google Books
- Steinhöwels Äsop, an 1873 scholarly edition on Google Books
