= Barbara Herrnstein Smith =

American literary critic and theorist

- Born: 1932 (age 93–94); Bronx, New York
- Education: City College of New York, Harvard, Brandeis University
- Writing career
- Period: 1968–
- Notable awards: Phi Beta Kappa Society – Christian Gauss Award 1968 Poetic Closure: A Study of How Poems End; – Explicator Award 1968 Poetic Closure: A Study of How Poems End; American Association of University Professors – Honorary Mention 1989 Contingencies of Value: Alternative Perspectives for Critical Theory; The Council of Editors of Learned Journals – Best Special Issue 1990 "The Politics of Liberal Education"; The American Educational Studies Association – Critic's Choice Award 1992 'The Politics of Liberal Education'; The Society for Literature, Science, and the Arts – Lifetime Achievement Award 2010

Barbara Herrnstein Smith (born 1932) is an American literary critic and theorist, best known for her work Contingencies of Value: Alternative Perspectives for Critical Theory. She is currently the Braxton Craven Professor of Comparative Literature and English and director of the Center for Interdisciplinary Studies in Science and Cultural Theory at Duke University, and also a Distinguished Professor of English at Brown University.

== Biography ==
Smith briefly studied at City College of New York, studying biology, experimental psychology, and philosophy. She then earned her B.A. (summa cum laude) in 1954 and her Ph.D. from Brandeis University. Brandeis University reports Smith earned her doctorate in 1965, and Duke University reports she earned her doctorate in 1963.

From 1961 to 1973, Smith taught at Bennington College. She accepted a faculty position at the University of Pennsylvania in 1973. In 1987 she joined the Duke University faculty, and also joined Brown University in 2003.

Smith has also occupied numerous short-term and honorary posts. She was a fellow at the Center for Advanced Study in the Behavioral Sciences at Stanford and at the Institute for Advanced Study in Princeton.

== Scholarship and work ==
Smith is a well-known writer, most particularly for her 1988 work on critical theory, Contingencies of Value: Alternative Perspectives for Critical Theory. In this work, she attempts to situate the various liberal, conservative, and other views of "values" within her "metametatheory" of contingencies, an economics-influenced theoretical approach. She uses her theory to address literary, aesthetic, and other types of values, attempting to discern whether any objective standards may be applied.

Other works include Poetic Closure: A Study of How Poems End, Belief and Resistance: Dynamics of Contemporary Intellectual Controversy, and an edition of Shakespeare's sonnets; she has published numerous books and articles on language, literature, and critical theory.

In recent years she has been doing considerable work on science and the humanities, including Scandalous Knowledge and her 2006 Terry lectures at Yale, Natural Reflections: Human Cognition at the Nexus of Science and Religion.

== Published works ==
- Discussion of Shakespeare's Sonnets (ed.) (1964) ISBN 0-669-22012-4
- Poetic Closure: A Study of How Poems End (1968) ISBN 0-226-76343-9
- Shakespeare's Sonnets (ed.) (1969) ISBN 0-685-06702-5
- On the Margins of Discourse: The Relation of Literature to Language (1978) ISBN 0-226-76452-4
- Contingencies of Value: Alternative Perspectives for Critical Theory (1988) ISBN 0-674-16785-6
- The Politics of Liberal Education (ed., with Darryl J. Gless) (1991) ISBN 0-8223-1199-2
- Mathematics, Science, and Postclassical Theory (ed., with Arkady Plotnitsky) (1997) ISBN 0-8223-1863-6
- Belief and Resistance: Dynamics of Contemporary Intellectual Controversy (1997) ISBN 0-674-06492-5
- Scandalous Knowledge: Science, Truth and the Human (2006) ISBN 0-8223-3848-3
- Natural Reflections: Human Cognition at the Nexus of Science and Religion (Terry Lectures) (2010) ISBN 0-300-14034-7
- Practicing Relativism in the Anthropocene: On Science, Belief, and the Humanities (2018) ISBN 1-7854-2070-4

== Awards and recognitions ==
- Christian Gauss Award for Poetic Closure, Phi Beta Kappa Society (1968)
- Explicator Award (1968) for Poetic Closure
- Guggenheim Fellowship (1977)
- Fellow, Center for Advanced Study in the Behavioral Sciences, Stanford (1986)
- Member, Institute for Advanced Study (1986–1987)
- President, Modern Language Association (1988)
- Honorary Mention for Contingencies of Value, American Association of University Professors (1989)
- "Best Special Issue" for "The Politics of Liberal Education" in South Atlantic Quarterly, The Council of Editors of Learned Journals (1990)
- Fellow, National Humanities Center (1992–1993)
- Critic's Choice Award for The Politics of Liberal Education, The American Educational Studies Association (1992)
- Fellow, The Davis Center for Historical Studies at Princeton University (1992-1993)
- Fellow, The Rockefeller Foundation Bellagio Center (1995)
- Fellow (elected), American Academy of Arts and Sciences (1999)
- Honorary Fellow, American Association for the Advancement of Science (2001)
- Dwight H. Terry Lecturer, Yale University (2006)
- Lifetime Achievement Award, The Society for Literature, Science, and the Arts (2010)
