= The Morall Fabillis of Esope the Phrygian =

Fables by fifteenth century Scottish poet, Robert Henryson

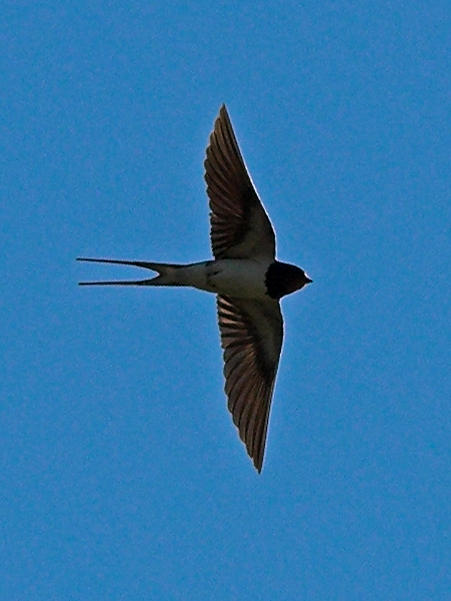

The Preiching of the Swallow

The Morall Fabillis of Esope the Phrygian is a work of Northern Renaissance literature composed in Middle Scots by the fifteenth century Scottish makar, Robert Henryson. It is a cycle of thirteen connected narrative poems based on fables from the European tradition. The drama of the cycle exploits a set of complex moral dilemmas through the figure of animals representing a full range of human psychology. As the work progresses, the stories and situations become increasingly dark.

The overall structure of the Morall Fabillis is symmetrical, with seven stories modelled on fables from Aesop (from the elegiac Romulus manuscripts, medieval Europe's standard fable text, written in Latin), interspersed by six others in two groups of three drawn from the more profane beast epic tradition. All the expansions are rich, wry and highly developed. The central poem of the cycle takes the form of a dream vision in which the narrator meets Aesop in person. Aesop tells the fable The Lion and the Mouse within the dream, and the structure of the poem is contrived so that this fable occupies the precise central position of the work.

Five of the six poems in the two 'beast epic' sections of the cycle feature the Reynardian trickster figure of the fox. Henryson styles the fox – in Scots the tod – as Lowrence. The two 'beast epic' sections of the poem (one in each half) also explore a developing relationship between Lowrence and the figure of the wolf. The wolf features in a number of different guises, including that of a Friar, and similarly appears in five out of the six stories. The wolf then makes a sixth and final appearance towards the end, stepping out of the 'beast epic' section to intrude most brutally in the penultimate poem of the 'Aesopic' sections.

The subtle and ambiguous way in which Henryson adapted and juxtaposed material from a diversity of sources in the tradition and exploited anthropomorphic conventions to blend human characteristics with animal observation both worked within, and pushed the bounds of, standard practice in the common medieval art of fable re-telling. Henryson fully exploited the fluid aspects of the tradition to produce an unusually sophisticated moral narrative, unique of its kind, making high art of an otherwise conventional genre.

Internal evidence might suggest that the work was composed in or around the 1480s.

== The poem in context ==
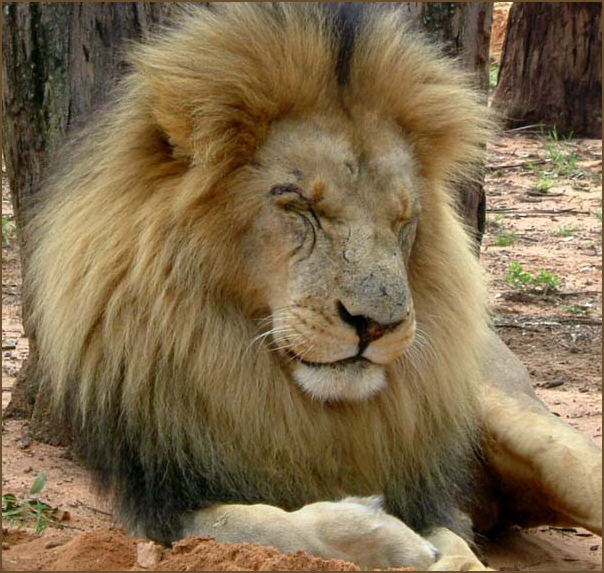

Fable stories were a common trope in medieval and renaissance literature. They were told with the didactic intent of drawing moral lessons which could be either secular or spiritual. Many different versions of the stories were created but writers frequently followed understood conventions. One such convention was the inclusion of the didactic moral lesson in a moralitas (plural moralitates) inserted after the fable. Henryson follows and develops this convention.

By today's standards most surviving fable literature is gey dreich, partly because fable writing was a common classroom exercise. Students might be asked to learn fable plots to retell them in contracted or expanded form – modo brevitur and modo latius respectively – then give moral conclusions that could be judged or debated either on secular grounds (ethics, character, etc.) or by following more "spiritual" scholastic principles to do with homily and allegory. In this light, the Morall Fabillis can be viewed technically as a work of maximal modo latius.

Readers who were familiar with the genre may have found the tone, range and complexity of Henryson's attractive, variegated and interlinked fable elaboration unexpected, but the method was not without precedent. A similar "trick" with the genre is found in Chaucer's Nun's Priest's Tale, which is retold by Henryson as Fabill 3 in his sequence and is one of the poem's most directly identifiable sources. However, Henryson's sustained blending and blurring of the secular and the spiritual strands of the genre goes much further than Chaucer's largely secular example.

== Numbers and structure ==
The strong likelihood that Henryson employed Christian numerology in composing his works has been increasingly discussed in recent years. Use of number for compositional control was common in medieval poetics and could be intended to have religious symbolism, and features in the accepted text of the Morall Fabilliis indicate that this was elaborately applied in that poem.

The table below outlines the stanza count for each of the thirteen Fabillis in order. All thirteen of the fabillis has a taill (tale) and a moralitas. Four of the fabillis also have a prolog. The number of stanzas in each of these structural sections, as they apply, is shown in the table.

In addition, six of the fabillis in the cycle are tales based on Reynardian beast epic sources. These are denoted by the lighter colour. It can be noted that the distribution of these (in two groups of three embedded within the seven fabillis from Aesop) is symmetrical, and that the distribution of the prologs – some apparently introductory material embedded in the centre of the poem – may begin to make better sense when these larger structures are taken into account.

=== Stanza counts in Henryson's Morall Fabillis ===
	Prolog	Taill	Moralitas	Totals
Fabill 1	9	9	5	23
Fabill 2	–	29	4	33
Fabill 3	2	25	4	31
Fabill 4	–	23	3	26
Fabill 5	–	43	7	50
Fabill 6	–	16	9	25
Fabill 7	12	24	7	43
Fabill 8	13	25	9	47
Fabill 9	–	36	4	40
Fabill 10	–	28	4	32
Fabill 11	–	19	4	23
Fabill 12	–	13	10	23
Fabill 13	–	19	9	28

Many commentators observe the central position of the taill in Fabill 7. The precision of this placing in terms of stanza count overall, however, is particularly notable. The Morall Fabillis consists of 424 stanzas overall, and the distribution of stanzas on either side of the central taill for fabill seven (the only one in the narrative of the cycle to be told directly by Aesop himself) is symmetrical, thus:

- First half of the cycle: 200 stanzas
- Central taill: 24 stanzas
- Second half of the cycle: 200 stanzas

In the architecture of the poem the precise structural centre of the accepted text is the central taill: 200 + 24 + 200

=== The seven ballade stanzas ===
In addition, 4 stanzas near the beginning of the first half (#53-#56) and 3 stanzas towards the end of the second half (#417-#419) are composed in the eight-line ballade form, instead of the seven-line rhyme royal in which the rest of the cycle is written (without further exception). This means, in effect, the poem has an "extra" seven lines (or the equivalent of one more "hidden" rhyme royal stanza) distributed across its two-halves – 4 lines in the first, 3 lines in the second. The line count for the three principal divisions of the structure therefore comes out as:

- First half: 1404
- Central taill: 168
- Second half: 1403

Making a total of 2795 lines.

=== Question of symmetry ===
Various literary scholars have noted the apparent symmetry in the architecture, citing it as evidence of an organising principle Henryson employed to "lock" the structure of the poem, aesthetically beautiful in its own right and holding important clues for interpreting his larger meaning or purpose. Others have preferred to defend individual readings of various fabillis viewed as self-sufficient entities which they argue question the coherence or completeness of that scheme. Finally John MacQueen cites fragmentation in surviving textual witnesses for the poem before 1570 as grounds for caution in asserting with certainty that the overall structure represents Henryson's intention. Nevertheless, the above outline describes the structure as received from the 16th century prints and manuscripts which give what the literary scholar Matthew McDiarmid calls the "accepted text".

== Place of Aesop in the fable sequence ==
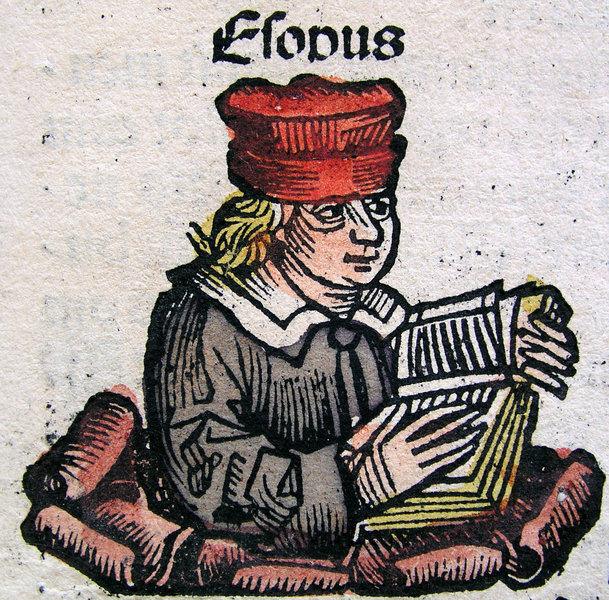
Aesop, as depicted by Hartmann Schedel in 1493.

The figure of Aesop is consistently cited throughout the poem as "my author" (my authority) by the narrator in those stories which are directly based on Aesopian sources. This usually occurs in the opening lines. However, one particularly distinctive feature of the poem is an appearance in person by Aesop himself. This occurs at the heart of the cycle within the prolog to Fabill 7. This presents the master fabulist meeting and conversing with the narrator (Henryson) in a dream vision. Aesop is also portrayed here as (by request of the narrator) directly telling the seventh fabill (The Taill of the Lyoun and the Mous) within this dream vision.

In contrast to more traditional portraits of Aesop as hunchbacked, this dream-vision version presents him as able-bodied. He is first met emerging "sturdily" from out of a schaw and immediately described as one of the "fairest" men the narrator has "ever" seen. A two-stanza portrait gives a detailed description of his appearance:

His gowne wes of ane claith als quhyte as milk,
His chymmeris wes of chambelate purpour broun,
His hude of scarlet, bordowrit weill with silk,
On heikillit wyis until his girdill doun,
His bonat round and of the auld fassoun,
His beird wes quhyte, his ene wes grit and gray,
With lokker hair quhilk over his schulderis lay.

Ane roll of paper in his hand he bair,
Ane swannis pen stikand under his eir,
Ane inkhorne with ane prettie gilt pennair,
Ane bag of silk, all at his belt can beir:
Thus wes he gudelie graithit in his geir,
Of stature large and with ane feirfull face.
Even quhair I lay he come ane sturdie pace,

And said, 'God speid, my sone...

(Robert Henryson, Morall Fabillis, lines 1347–1363)

Other Henrysonian variations from the traditional portrait include identifying Aesop as Roman rather than Greek, and as Christianised rather than pagan. It seems unlikely that these "innovations" were not consciously decided, although critics do not agree on how they are to be best interpreted.

There is no evidence that the portrait stood for Henryson himself, although the suggestion has sometimes been made. Henryson and Aesop remain quite distinct in the dialogue of the prologue. Moreover, Fabill 8 goes on to repeat the prologue device of Fabill 7, only this time to show the narrator himself (Henryson) telling the fable – one which has some less ideal and more "realistic" parallels – awake and in real time.

== Question of purpose ==
Henryson's contribution to the fable tradition is such a uniquely developed, subtly crafted and ambiguous example of a commonplace genre that it presents questions as to the poet's ultimate purpose in composition.

== The Thirteen Fabillis ==
The parts in this section give brief descriptions of each poem in the Morall Fabillis. You can also click the heading links to read separate main pages with fuller articles for each individual fabill.

=== Prolog and Fabill 1 ===
The poem which opens the Morall Fabillis is The Taill of the Cok and the Jasp. It has three parts: a prologue, the tale itself, and a moral.

==== Prolog ====
The Prolog introduces the whole cycle in principle, not merely the first fabill. It begins with a defence of the art of storytelling, argues that humour is a necessary part of life and tells the reader that the intention is to make a translation of Aesop from Latin.

Fable translation was a standard classroom exercise in medieval Europe and the principal source for this was the Latin verse Romulus. Henryson's opening argument is, indeed, an expanded and re-orchestrated "translation" of the argument in the opening prologue of the Romulus text, but even from the start the poet far exceeds his commonplace "commission". He expands the unremarkable classroom material with an unusual degree of refinement, invention and cognisance, establishes a mature and personalised relationship with the reader, highlights Aesop's uncomfortably human context and hints at ambiguities. The prolog immediately foreshadows methods that the rest of the cycle will further develop.

==== Taill and moralitas ====

The first fabill in the Romulus text, De Gallo et Jaspide (The Cock and the Jewel), depicts a cockerel who rejects a valuable gemstone in preference for more precious grain. The Morall Fabillis opens with the same example. Although the fabill has no substantial story as such, Henryson's version quietly keeps the narrative promises made in the prolog by re-imagining the material as a strongly realised vignette, giving it a specific setting and hinting at a fully characterised cockerel. His artfulness subtly foreshadows the more fully fleshed stories yet to come (deferred tactics) but the adaption remains broadly conservative and the moralitas (moral; plural moralitates) comes down unreservedly against the cockerel on the grounds that the jewel represents wisdom rather than wealth. In the Romulus this judgement occurs in only two lines; Henryson, making the same case, states it with an almost unexpected force, taking five stanzas.

Despite providing the standard "medieval" closure on Aesop's "riddle", most modern critics note the way Henryson nevertheless seems to contrive an effect of dissonance between the fabill and the moralitas. Longer acquaintance may modify this view, but the impression remains of an opening poem that wants to establish layered modes of narration, introduce complexity and contrive to play with readers' expectations.

=== Fabill 2 ===
Fabill 2 (The Twa Mice) is a retelling of Aesop's Town Mouse and Country Mouse. Its purpose is to recommend and praise simple living. Henryson expands upon common versions of the story to create a succinct, fully fleshed narrative rich in incident and characterisation which fairly transcends its known sources while remaining faithful to the story's original elements. It is possibly one of the best known and most anthologised of his poems.

In context, Fabill 2 sets a standard for free narrative improvisation, coupled with close control and subtlety of inference, that will be sustained for the remainder of the larger cycle. At this point the adaptation is conservative, but other tales (e.g. Fabill 6) will make far less straightforward use of Aesop.

=== Fabill 3 ===
Fabill 3 (The Cock and the Fox) is the first Reynardian story in the Morall Fabillis and thus introduces the tod into the cycle. In various incarnations he is principal figure in the cycle after the wolf. Tod is a Scots word for fox and the poem interchangeably uses both terms. Henryson's tod is called Schir Lowrence.

The story in the fabill is an important adaptation of Chaucer's Nun's Priest's Tale. The successful conceit of Chaucer's poem was to create comic drama from a simple act of animal predation. Henryson's version condenses the main action, refines the psychology and introduces many variations, such as for instance its feature of three hens, Pertok, Sprutok and Toppok, each with distinctly contrasted characters.

Fabill 3 is the first in a sequence of three taillis (3, 4 and 5) which form a continuous narrative within the larger whole, the only section of the cycle to do this.

=== Fabill 4 ===
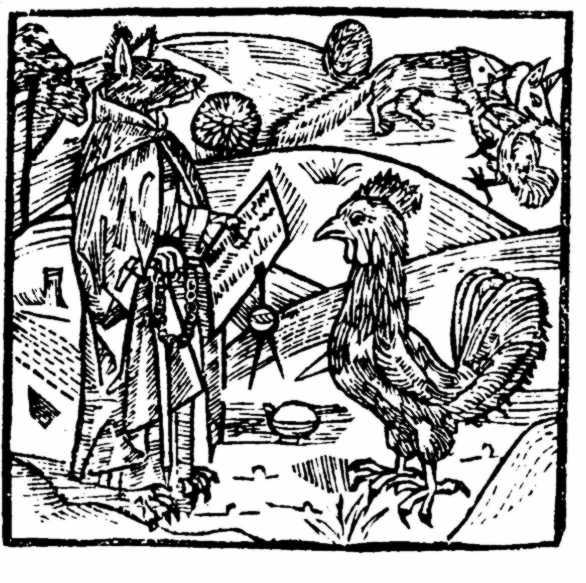
A German depiction of the Cock and the Fox, c. 1498

Fabill 4, The Confession of the Tod, "The Taill of how this forsaid Tod maid his Confessioun to Freir Wolf Waitskaith" (or "The Confessioun of the Tod") continues the story from the previous fabill and follows the fatal aventure and destinie of the tod after losing his prey. It is also the taill in which the wolf, the major figure of the cycle (in terms of number of times featured) first enters as a protagonist. It is also the second in a linked "mini-cycle" of three taillis in that poem which follows the fate of a family line of foxes. The principal action of the fabill revolves around rites of confession, penance and the remission of sins. These were all standard practice in the Scotland of Henryson's time.

The story picks up where the previous fable left off, as the Cock returns safe and happy to his family (it's still unknown what his wives think about it, though it's hinted that they are relieved he survived at all), but the fox, Lawrence, was starving as he waits until nightfall before his next hunt. When it gets dark, Lawrence, though he never been to college, had been gifted with knowledge enough to foresee his own future and that of his descendants by astrology, and after seeing the bad omens that align the planets with unfitting constellations, Lawrence comes to realize that unless he or one of his descendants could repent and amend himself or wrongdoings, he and his family (as the fate of all foxes, but worse to compare) will be shamed forever with the "cursed life of a thief", which is said to be so horrible that it orphans each new generation as the last one is sentenced to death for a crime he didn't commit. Thinking himself a lost cause, Lawrence the fox, in the light of dawn, sees Friar Wolf Waitskaith and assumes that admitting sin in the presence of this assumingly holy man would help free himself. The friar Wolf is pleased as the fox admits to lying, stealing, adultery, and even exaggerates by mentioning murder (few as his successful hunting-and-killings may be). After that, Lawrence the fox, believing himself cleansed of his wrongs, fears doing so again, as he is from a povertous family, and is too proud to work or beg for his meals, but upon Friar Wolf suggesting he fast and eat nothing with flesh until Easter, Lawrence resorts to begging to be an exception to the custom. The friar granted it, but suggested that it would be only fish from the stream at least once or twice a week. Lawrence takes the advice gracefully, but then finds the new practice difficult as he has no net, pole, or boat to fish with properly, and so has to keep swiping at the water and missing his catch. Upon one of these unsuccessful fishing trips, the fox sees a fat lamb had strayed from the flock, and driven by hunger, he cannot resist pouncing on it. While the lamb survived the incident, the shepherd caught Lawrence the fox in the act of attempting to kill it, and although he said that he was "only kidding" and pleads he'd never do it again, the fox meets his end by a single, unmerciful blow from the shepherd. (the next story is the official beginning of Reynard's tale, as he faces trial for his father's sins.)

In Henryson's day, the wolf was still a native creature to Scotland.

=== Fabill 5 ===
Fabill 5 (The Trial of the Tod) is the third Reynardian tale in the Morall Fabillis. Schir Lowrence is dead and his carcase disposed of without ceremony in a bog (a peat pot) by his bastard son who relishes the opportunity to ring and raxe intill his (faitheris) steid.

The young tod's hopes are checked by the arrival of the Royal Court of the Lion and the command that all the animals must appear at a regal tribunall. After trying to "hide at the back", Lowrence is called forward and sent, along with a rather incompetent wolf, to serve a summons on a mare who has failed to appear before the lion. There is much brutal action in the subsequent "comic" story. Despite efforts to avoid justice, Lowrence ultimately does not escape standing trial and being sentenced for his crimes.

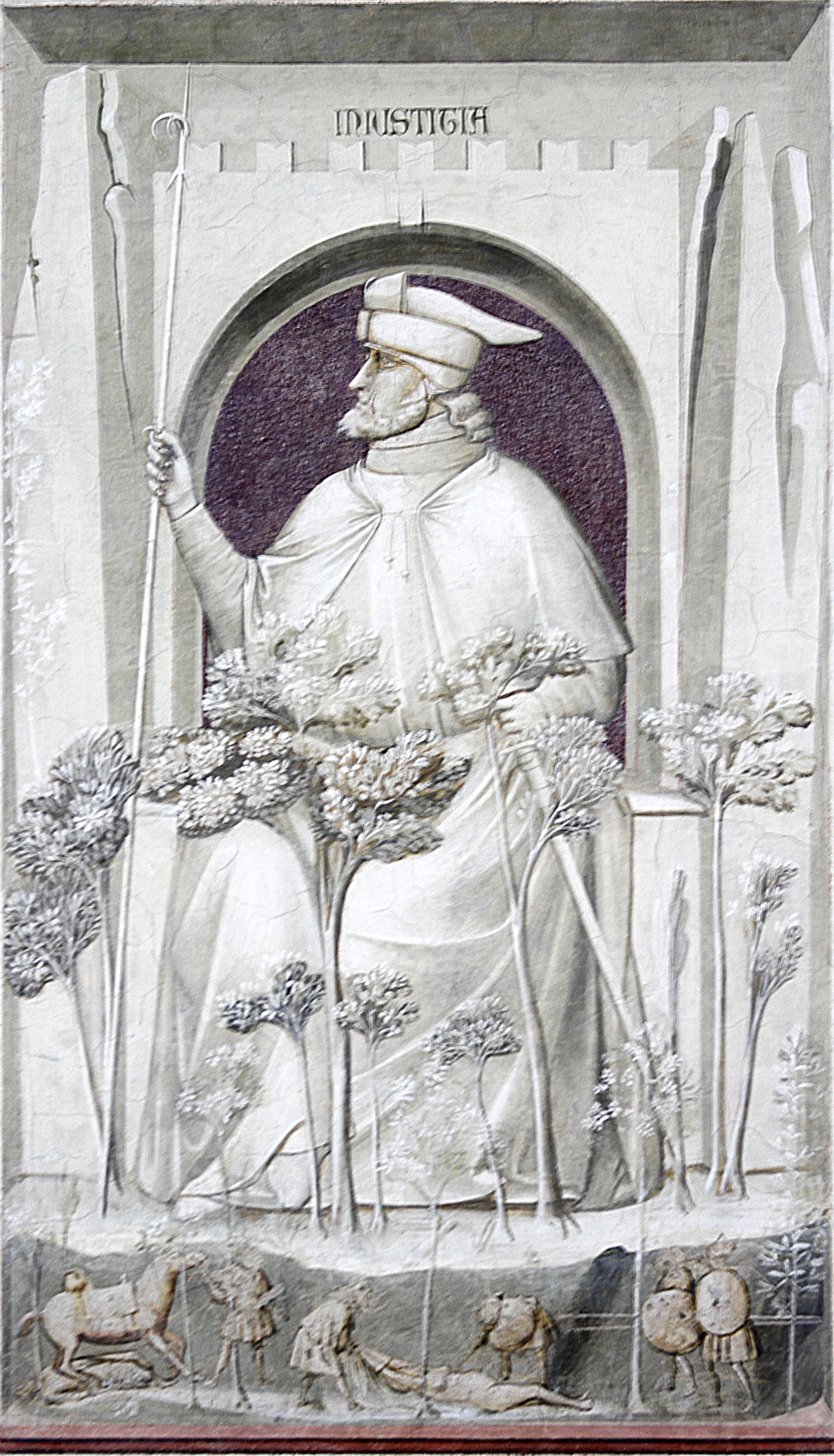
Giotto, Injustice

At fifty stanzas, The Trial of the Tod is the longest poem in the cycle.

=== Fabill 6 ===
Fabill 6 (The Sheep and the Dog) is the third of the Aesopian tales in the Morall Fabillis. Of the thirteen poems in the cycle, it is one of the most starkly written and the adaptation of its source (Aesop's The Sheep and the Dog) is not at all straightforward. Henryson's version portrays the relationship between the two figures in terms of a trial. The sheep is required to submit to a long, complex, unethically convened judicial process so that the dog may procure recompense for "stolen" bread. The sheep loses the case, is stripped of his fleece and left to face the winter elements unprotected. The action of the fabill carries over into the moralitas in which the sheep questions whether God's justice is detectable on earth.

Although Henryson's sixth fabill is not linked to the previous one in direct narrative terms, it is notable that both involve a trial and feature what seem to be, on the surface, contrasting visions of human justice.

=== Core prolog and Fabill 7 ===
Fabill 7 (The Lion and the Mouse) is a straightforward but rich expansion of Esope's well-known The Lion and the Mouse in which the lion who reprieves the mouse he has captured is, in return, rescued by the mouse after himself becoming ensnared. Some commentators have noted that the section which describes the imprisonment of the lion is described in terms which plausibly evokes identifiable political events during the reign of James III.

As the central poem in the accepted text of the cycle overall, it has a number of unusual features. Firstly, there is a long prolog which introduces both the narrator and Esope as protagonists directly into the poem as part of the framing action for the fabill. Secondly, the taill is told directly by Esope within the narrator's dream (the narrator meets Esope as part of a dream vision). The moralitas is also delivered by Esope. Thirdly, it is the only fabill in the cycle to have an unambiguously ideal outcome in which all parties have gained.

The plea that the mouse makes for the lion to temper mercy with justice is a long one (10 stanzas) and invokes important civil, legal and spiritual concepts.

=== Fabill 8 ===

Fabill 8 (The Preaching of the Swallow) is widely regarded as being one of Henryson's finest poems. Like Fabill 7 it has a prolog which introduces the narrator directly into the poem, but this time he remains awake and witnesses the story himself (also reporting it himself) as real-time action in the world. The source for the story he "witnesses" is Esope's The Owl and the Birds, a parable in which the wisest of the birds (the owl) counsels all the rest to remove or avoid features in the world which are mortal to their kind. Henryson changes the protagonist to a swallow and the avian danger he selects is flax production, identified for its role in making fowlers' nets.

=== Fabill 9 ===
Fabill 9 (The Fox, the Wolf and the Cadger) is the first of the second set of three Reynardian taillis in the poem. It presents the wolf for the first time in his true fabill colours as a ruthless and lordly predator demanding obeisance. The tod similarly manifests as a wily trickster who (in contrast to the first half of the cycle) completely succeeds in outwitting his victims. The business also involves a human character as a full protagonist.

At the beginning of the taill, the wolf recruits Lowrence into his service. The fox either is, or pretends to be, reluctant but appears to have no choice. While in service, Lowrence opportunistically plants in his master a desire for the largest and most valuable fish (the mysterious "nekhering") from the cart of a passing fish merchant (the cadger) and uses his "demonstration" of how it can be stolen as a single ploy to outwit both the wolf and the man.

The plot of this and the next fabill, which have many parallels and ring many changes, both explore the complex relationship between the wolf, the fox and a man.

=== Fabill 10 ===
Fabill 10 (The Fox, the Wolf and the Husbandman), like the fabill before, is the story of a fox who pretends to serve the best interests of a wolf. Again it fully involves a human character in its action and this time even opens with the man as a protagonist.

This time the interest which the fox purports to defend is the wolf's claim on the husbandman's cattle. The case is presented to the man (who is both surprised and fearful at the development) suddenly while on the road at dusk and he has considerable difficulty in countering the wolf's claim. The tod plays the part of lawyer for both the defence and the prosecution, contriving that the man, in effect, keeps his cattle for a bribe. The wolf is then bought off with a trick similar to Fabill 9, only this time, the planted desire is for a non-existent kebbuck and the wolf ends up stranded at the bottom of a well at midnight.

=== Fabill 11 ===
Fabill 11 (The Wolf and the Wether) opens, like Fabill 10, with a human protagonist (the shepherd) but its principal action involves a sheep in a dog skin who believes he is able to guard the rest of the flock from the wolf. The story, in terms of the protagonists, is a complete reversal of Esope's fable The Wolf in Sheep's Clothing, although the outcome is essentially the same. Because it is the well-meaning sheep that is destroyed at the end of the fabill (rather than the wolf, as happens in the source) the moralitas, which is short and focusses all the condemnation on the sheep, does not feel like a fair or complete account of the action. The surface message is a profoundly conservative warning to stick to one's station in life.

=== Fabill 12 ===
Fabill 12 (The Wolf and the Lamb) similarly involves the characters of the wolf and a sheep, but this time it is a more straightforward expansion of The Wolf and the Lamb, one of Esope's bleakest "stories". As in Fabill 11, the wolf pitilessly kills his victim. This time, however, the narrator's response in the moralitas (10 stanzas – the longest in the cycle) – is, or seems to be, completely different in terms of sympathies and more impassioned on the theme of social, political and legal injustice.

=== Fabill 13 and Conclusion ===
Fabill 13 (The Paddock and the Mouse) is the final poem in the Morall Fabillis. It closes the cycle with a reintroduction of the figure of the mouse which also featured close to the beginning (in Fabill 2) and in the central poem (Fabill 7). The final stanzas of the moralitas also act as a conclusion to the cycle.

The fabill is a straightforward and rich expansion of Aesop's The Frog and the Mouse.

== See also ==
- Hermeneutics
- Phaedrus
