= Malkin =

Malkin as a surname may refer to:

- Arthur Malkin (1803–1888), English writer, alpinist and cricketer
- Barry Malkin (1938–2019), American film editor
- Benjamin Heath Malkin (1769–1842), antiquary and author
- Chris Malkin (born 1967), English football player
- Efim Malkin (born 1954), Russian politician
- Eran Malkin (born 1993), Israeli footballer
- Evgeni Malkin (born 1986), Russian professional ice hockey player for the Pittsburgh Penguins of the NHL
- Felice Pazner Malkin (born 1929), Israeli artist
- Herbert Malkin (1836–1913), English lawyer and cricketer
- Herbert William Malkin (1883–1945), English lawyer, son of Herbert Malkin
- John Malkin (1921–1994), English football player for Stoke City
- Joseph Malkin (fl. 1920s, 1930s), English rugby league player
- Joseph Malkin (1879–1969), principal cellist for the Boston Symphony Orchestra, who founded the Malkin Conservatory in Boston in 1933
- Mary Ann O'Brian Malkin (1913–2005), collector of books on dance notation
- Michelle Malkin (born 1970), American political columnist, born Michelle Maglalang
- Mikhail Malkin (born 1996), Azerbaijani trampolinist
- Myron Samuel Malkin (1924–1994), director of the NASA space shuttle program
- Peter Malkin (1927–2005), Israeli secret agent
- Peter L. Malkin (born 1934), American real estate investor
- Peter Malkin (cricketer) (born 1951), English cricketer
- Robert Malkin, engineer specializing in medical instrumentation for the developing world
- Russ Malkin, British film producer and director
- Scott D. Malkin (born 1959), American businessman
- Sivan Malkin Maas, Israeli ordained as a rabbi in Humanistic Judaism
- Tal Malkin (born 1970), Israeli-American cryptographer
- Terry Malkin (1935–2010), British speed skater
- Vitaly Malkin (born 1952), Russian-Israeli business oligarch and politician
- William Harold Malkin (1868–1959), mayor of Vancouver, Canada
  - Malkin Bowl, an outdoor theatre in Vancouver
- Yaakov Malkin (1926–2019), educator, literary critic, and Tel Aviv University academic

== See also ==
- Grimalkin, archaic term for a cat
- Malkin Tower (early 1600s, demolished), connected to witch trials in Lancashire, England
- "The Malkin Jewel", 2012 single by The Mars Volta

Related names

- Malka(h) (Hebrew: מלכה, Yiddish: málke)
- Malkov, Malkoff (not Czech: Málkov)
- Małkowski
- Malkovich
- Malko
