= Pastoral =

Genre relating to shepherds and the countryside

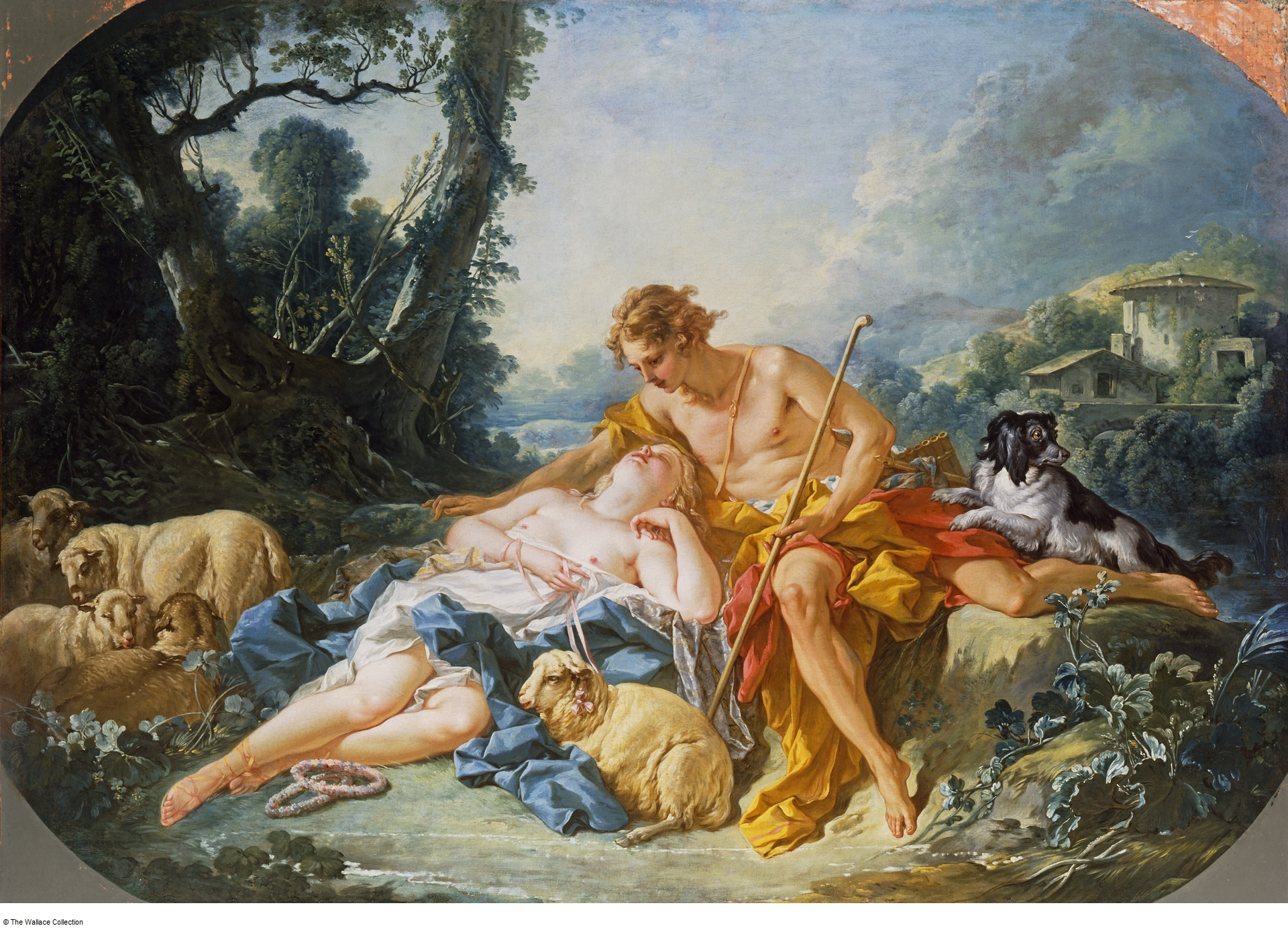
Francois Boucher, Daphnis and Chloe, 1743, based on the Hellenistic pastoral novel

The pastoral genre of literature, art, or music depicts an idealised form of the shepherd's lifestyle – herding livestock around open areas of land according to the seasons and the changing availability of water and pasture. The target audience is typically an urban one. A pastoral is a work of this genre. A piece of music in the genre is usually referred to as a pastorale.

The genre is also known as bucolic, from the Greek βουκολικόν, from βουκόλος, meaning a cowherd. Arcadia is the traditional setting for the pastoral.

Originating in classical antiquity, and less prominent in the Middle Ages, the genre revived in the Renaissance, and continued to be very important until at least the eighteenth century. From Romanticism onwards, living in a rural and natural setting continued to be a major concern in the arts, but usually without protagonists imagined as farmworkers, the essential mark of the pastoral.

== Literature ==
Pastoral is a mode of literature in which the author employs various techniques to place the complex life into a simple one. Paul Alpers distinguishes pastoral as a mode rather than a genre, and he bases this distinction on the recurring attitude of power; that is to say that pastoral literature holds a humble perspective toward nature. Thus, pastoral as a mode occurs in many types of literature (poetry, drama, etc.) as well as genres (most notably the pastoral elegy).

Terry Gifford, a prominent literary theorist, defines pastoral in three ways in his critical book Pastoral. The first way emphasizes the historical literary perspective of the pastoral in which authors recognize and discuss life in the country and in particular the life of a shepherd. This is summed up by Leo Marx with the phrase "No shepherd, no pastoral." The second type of the pastoral is literature that "describes the country with an implicit or explicit contrast to the urban". The third type of pastoral depicts the country life with derogative classifications.

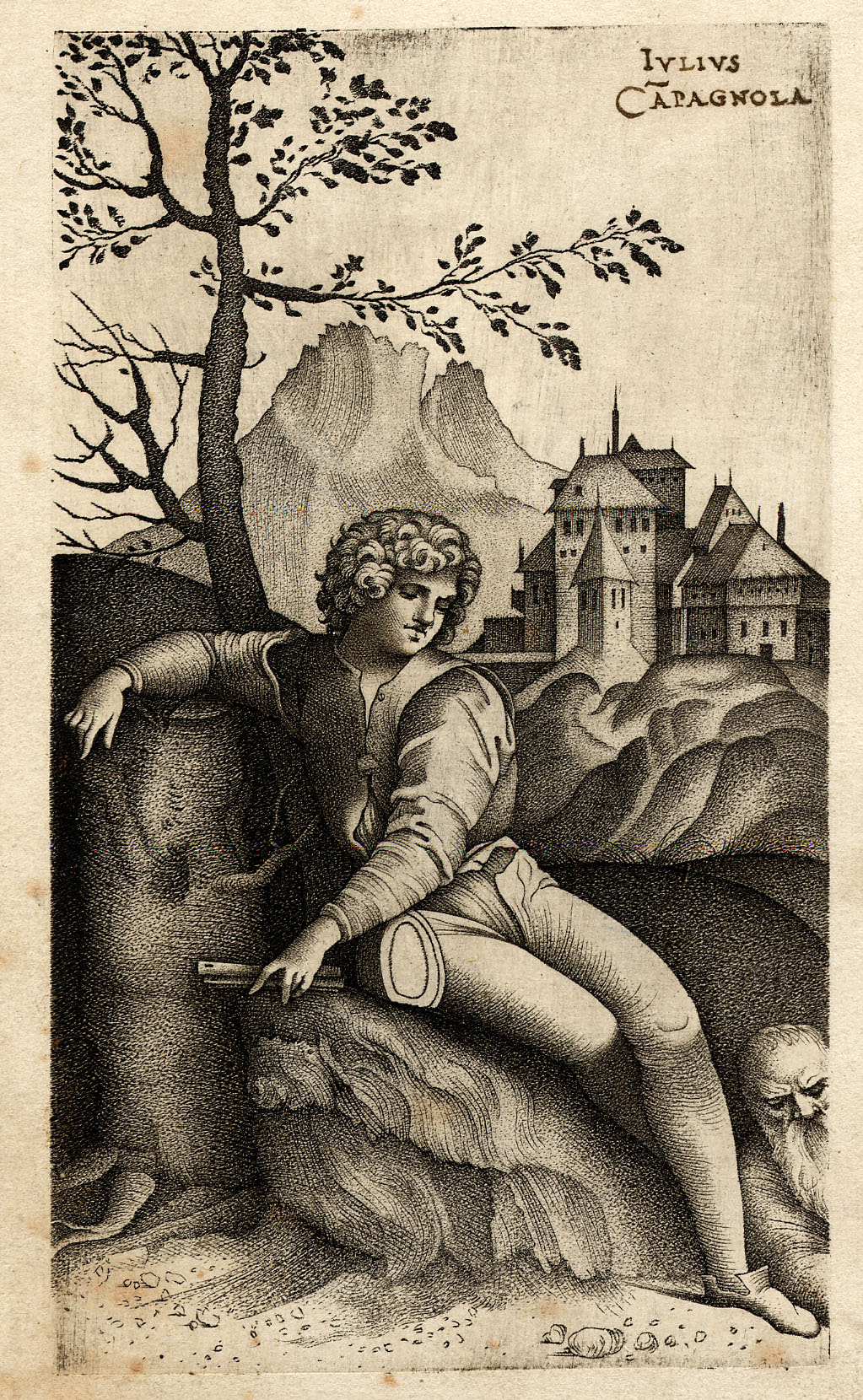
The Young Shepherd, engraving using stipple technique, by Giulio Campagnola, c. 1510

Hesiod's Works and Days presents a 'golden age' when people lived together in harmony with nature. This Golden Age shows that even before the Alexandrian age, ancient Greeks had sentiments of an ideal pastoral life that they had already lost. This is the first example of literature that has pastoral sentiments and may have begun the pastoral tradition. Ovid's Metamorphoses is much like the Works and Days with the description of ages (golden, silver, bronze, iron, and human) but with more ages to discuss and less emphasis on the gods and their punishments. In this artificially constructed world, nature acts as the main punisher. Another example of this perfect relationship between man and nature is evident in the encounter of a shepherd and a goatherd who meet in the pastures in Theocritus' poem Idylls 1.

Traditionally, pastoral refers to the lives of herdsmen in a romanticized, exaggerated, but representative way. In literature, the adjective 'pastoral' refers to rural subjects and aspects of life in the countryside among shepherds, cowherds and other farm workers that are often romanticized and depicted in a highly unrealistic manner. The pastoral life is usually characterized as being closer to the golden age than the rest of human life. The setting is a locus amoenus, or a beautiful place in nature, sometimes connected with images of the Garden of Eden. An example of the use of the genre is the short poem by the 15th-century Scottish makar Robert Henryson Robene and Makyne which also contains the conflicted emotions often present in the genre. A more tranquil mood is set by Christopher Marlowe's well known lines from his 1588 The Passionate Shepherd to His Love:

Come live with me and be my Love,
And we will all the pleasures prove
That hills and valleys, dale and field,
And all the craggy mountains yield.

There will we sit upon the rocks
And see the shepherds feed their flocks,
By shallow rivers, to whose falls
Melodious birds sing madrigals.

"The Passionate Shepherd to His Love" exhibits the concept of Gifford's second definition of 'pastoral'. The speaker of the poem, who is the titled shepherd, draws on the idealization of urban material pleasures to win over his love rather than resorting to the simplified pleasures of pastoral ideology. This can be seen in the listed items: "lined slippers", "purest gold", "silver dishes", and "ivory table" (lines 13, 15, 16, 21, 23). The speaker takes on a voyeuristic point of view with his love, and they are not directly interacting with the other true shepherds and nature.

Pastoral shepherds and maidens usually have Greek names like Corydon or Philomela, reflecting the origin of the pastoral genre. Pastoral poems are set in beautiful rural landscapes, the literary term for which is "locus amoenus" (Latin for "beautiful place"), above all Arcadia, a literary construct with only a tenuous relationship to the physical Arcadia, a rural backwoods region of Greece. Arcadia is the mythological home of the god Pan, which was portrayed as a sort of Eden by the poets. The tasks of their employment with sheep and other rustic chores is held in the fantasy to be almost wholly undemanding and is left in the background, leaving the shepherdesses and their swains in a state of almost perfect leisure. This makes them available for embodying perpetual erotic fantasies. The shepherds spend their time chasing pretty girls – or, at least in the Greek and Roman versions, pretty boys as well. The eroticism of Virgil's second eclogue, Formosum pastor Corydon ardebat Alexin ("The shepherd Corydon burned with passion for pretty Alexis"), is entirely homosexual.

=== Pastoral poetry ===
==== Ancient ====
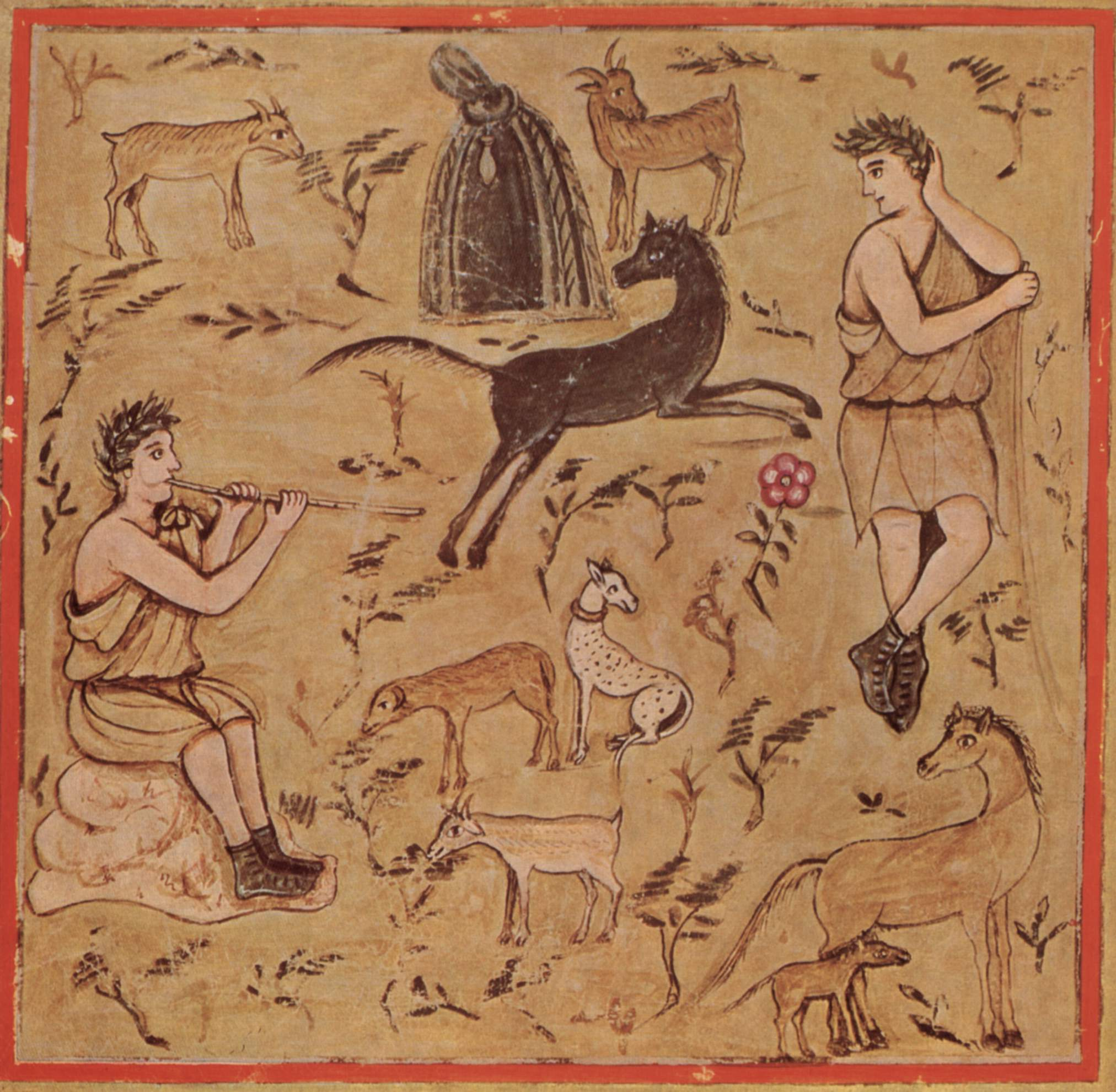
Georgics Book III, Shepherd with Flocks, Virgil (Vatican Library)

Pastoral literature continued after Hesiod with the poetry of the Hellenistic Greek Theocritus, several of whose Idylls are set in the countryside (probably reflecting the landscape of the island of Cos where the poet lived) and involve dialogues between herdsmen. Theocritus may have drawn on authentic folk traditions of Sicilian shepherds. He wrote in the Doric dialect but the metre he chose was the dactylic hexameter associated with the most prestigious form of Greek poetry, epic. This blend of simplicity and sophistication would play a major part in later pastoral verse. Theocritus was imitated by the Greek poets Bion and Moschus.

The Roman poet Virgil adapted pastoral into Latin with his highly influential Eclogues. Virgil introduces two very important uses of pastoral, the contrast between urban and rural lifestyles and political allegory most notably in Eclogues 1 and 4 respectively. In doing so, Virgil presents a more idealized portrayal of the lives of shepherds while still employing the traditional pastoral conventions of Theocritus. He was the first to set his poems in Arcadia, an idealized location to which much later pastoral literature will refer.

Horace's Epodes, ii Country Joys has "the dreaming man" Alfius, who dreams of escaping his busy urban life for the peaceful country. But as "the dreaming man" indicates, this is just a dream for Alfius. He is too consumed in his career as a usurer to leave it behind for the country.

Later Silver Latin poets who wrote pastoral poetry, modeled principally upon Virgil's Eclogues, include Calpurnius Siculus and Nemesianus and the author(s) of the Einsiedeln Eclogues.

==== Modern ====
Italian poets revived the pastoral from the 14th century onwards, first in Latin (examples include works by Petrarch, Pontano and Mantuan) then in the Italian vernacular (Sannazaro, Boiardo). The fashion for pastoral spread throughout Renaissance Europe.

Leading French pastoral poets include Marot, a poet of the French court, and Pierre de Ronsard, once called the "prince of poets" in his day.

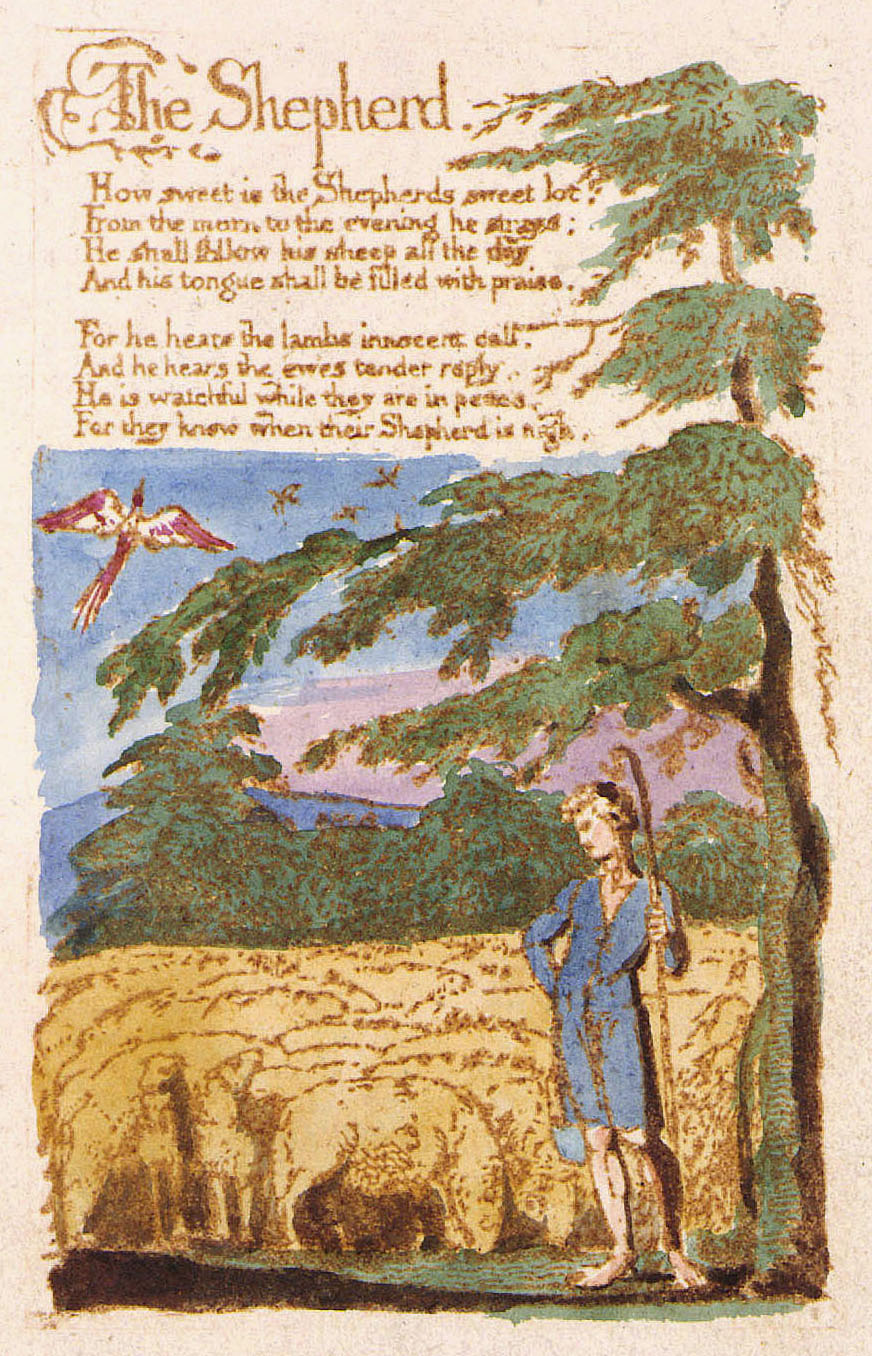
Romantic artist, illustrator and poet William Blake's hand painted print illustrating his pastoral poem "The Shepherd" depicts the pastoral scene of a shepherd watching his flock with a shepherd's crook. This image represents copy B, printed and painted in 1789, now in Library of Congress.

The first pastorals in English were the Eclogues (c. 1515) of Alexander Barclay, which were heavily influenced by Mantuan. A landmark in English pastoral poetry was Spenser's The Shepheardes Calender, first published in 1579. Spenser's work consists of twelve eclogues, one for each month of the year, and is written in dialect. It contains elegies, fables and a discussion of the role of poetry in contemporary England. Spenser and his friends appear under various pseudonyms (Spenser himself is "Colin Clout"). Spenser's example was imitated by such poets as Michael Drayton (Idea, The Shepherd's Garland) and William Browne (Britannia's Pastorals). During this period of England's history, many authors explored "anti-pastoral" themes. Two examples of this, Sir Philip Sidney's "The Twenty-Third Psalm" and "The Nightingale", focus on the world in a very anti-pastoral view. In "The Twenty-Third Psalm", Nature is portrayed as something we need to be protected from, and in "The Nightingale", the woe of Philomela is compared to the speaker's own pain. Sidney also wrote Arcadia, which is filled with pastoral descriptions of the landscape. "The Nymph's Reply to the Shepherd" (1600) by Sir Walter Raleigh also comments on the anti-pastoral as the nymph responds realistically to the idealizing shepherd of The Passionate Shepherd to His Love by embracing and explaining the true course of nature and its incompatibility with the love that the Shepherd yearns for with the nymph. Terry Gifford defined the anti-pastoral in his 2012 essay "Pastoral, Anti-Pastoral and Post-Pastoral as Reading Strategies" as an often explicit correction of pastoral, emphasizing "realism" over romance, highlighting problematic elements (showing tensions, disorder and inequalities), challenging literary constructs as false distortions and demythologizing mythical locations such as Arcadia and Shangri-La.

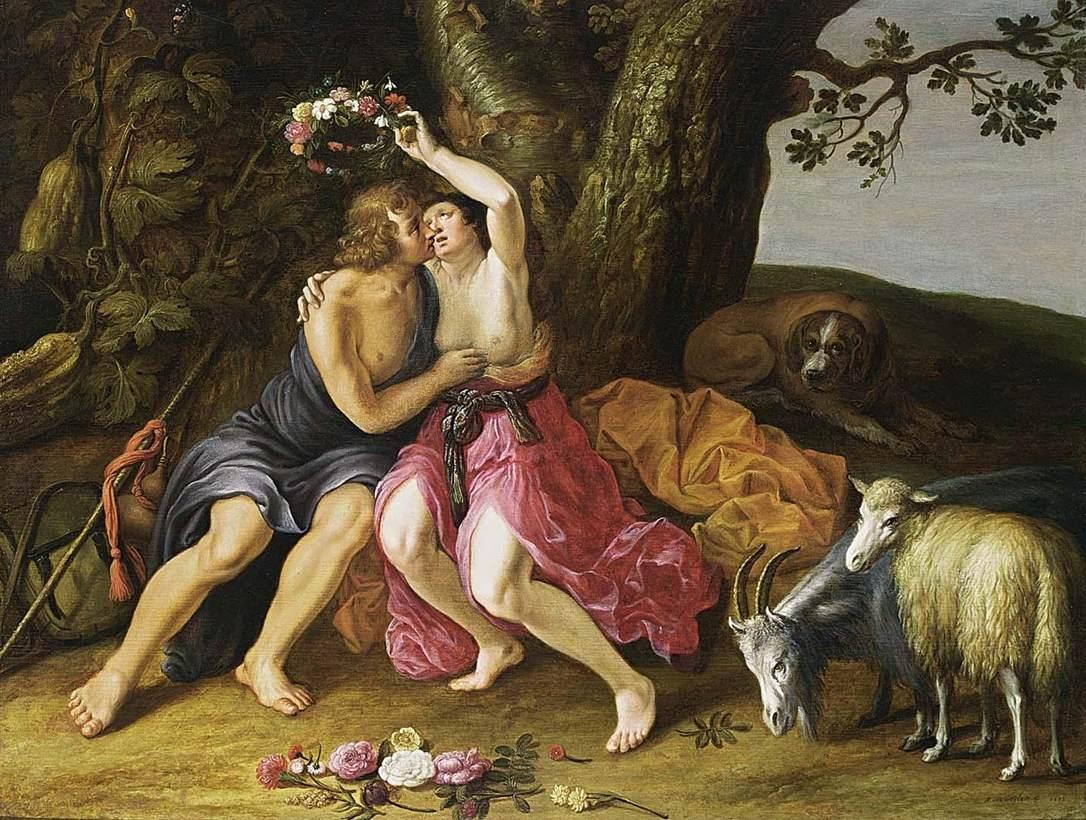
Adriaen van Nieulandt (II), Amarillis Crowning Mirtillo, a scene from Il Pastor Fido, 1648

In the 17th century came the country house poem. Included in this genre is Emilia Lanier's The Description of Cooke-ham in 1611, in which a woman is described in terms of her relationship to her estate and how it mourns for her when she leaves it. In 1616, Ben Jonson wrote To Penshurst, a poem in which he addresses the estate owned by the Sidney family and tells of its beauty. The basis of the poem is a harmonious and joyous elation of the memories that Jonson had at the manor. It is beautifully written with iambic pentameter, a style that Jonson eloquently uses to describe the culture of Penshurst. It includes Pan and Bacchus as notable company of the manor. Pan, Greek god of the Pastoral world, half man and half goat, was connected with both hunting and shepherds; Bacchus was the god of wine, intoxication and ritual madness. This reference to Pan and Bacchus in a pastoral view demonstrates how prestigious Penshurst was, to be worthy in the company with gods.

"A Country Life", another 17th-century work by Katherine Philips, was also a country house poem. Philips focuses on the joys of the countryside and looks upon the lifestyle that accompanies it as being "the first and happiest life, when man enjoyed himself". She writes about maintaining this lifestyle by living detached from material things, and by not over-concerning herself with the world around her. Andrew Marvell's "Upon Appleton House" was written when Marvell was working as a tutor for Lord Fairfax's daughter Mary, in 1651. The poem is very rich with metaphors that relate to religion, politics and history. Similar to Jonson's "To Penshurst", Marvell's poem is describing a pastoral estate. It moves through the house itself, its history, the gardens, the meadows and other grounds, the woods, the river, his Pupil Mary, and the future. Marvell used nature as a thread to weave together a poem centered around man. We once again see nature fully providing for man. Marvell also continuously compares nature to art and seems to point out that art can never accomplish on purpose what nature can achieve accidentally or spontaneously.

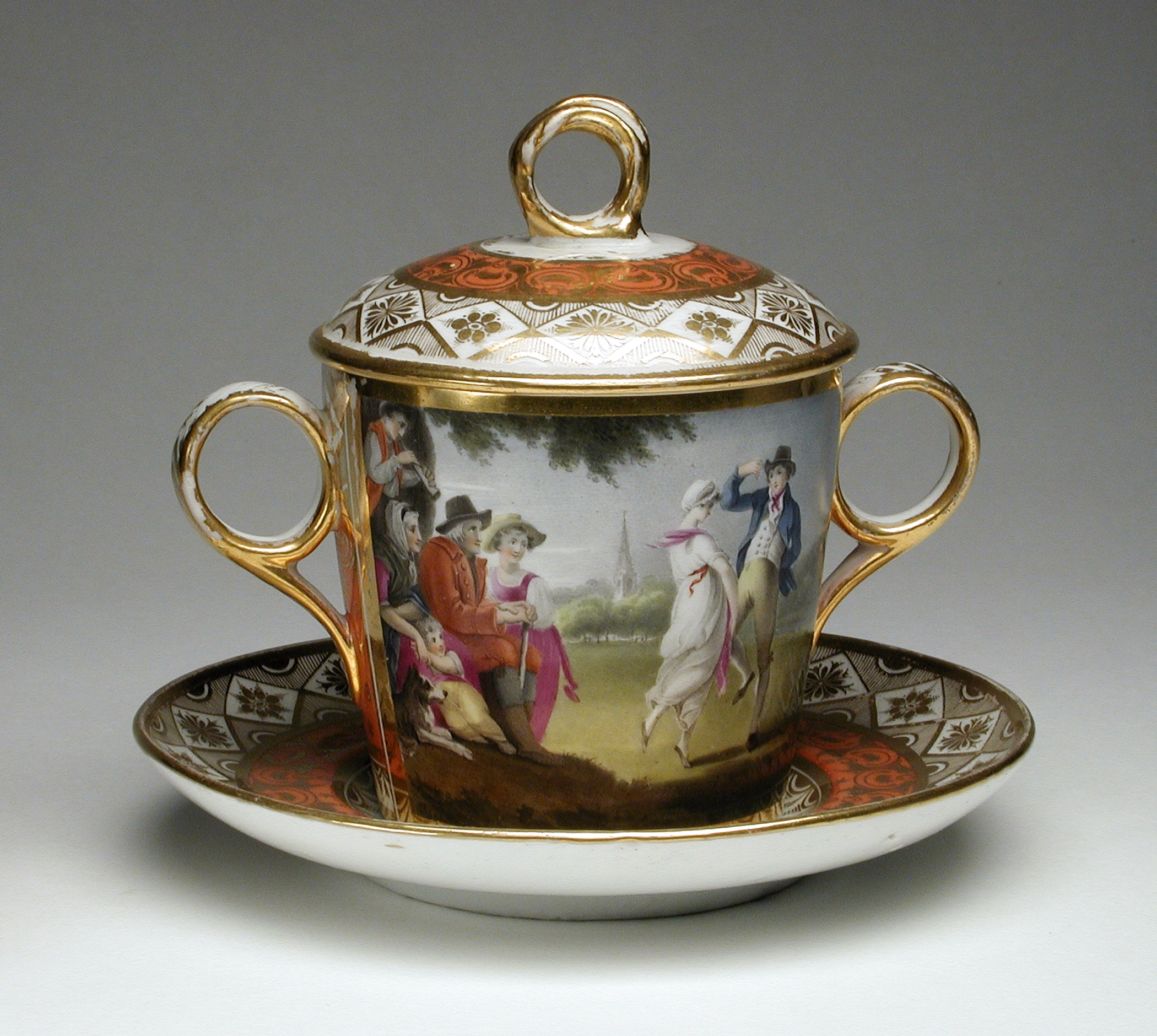
Chamberlain's factory, Worcester, c. 1805. Two-handled cup with cover, so a caudle cup type, with pastoral scene.

Robert Herrick's The Hock-cart, or Harvest Home was also written in the 17th century. In this pastoral work, he paints the reader a colorful picture of the benefits reaped from hard work. This is an atypical interpretation of the pastoral, given that there is a celebration of labor involved as opposed to central figures living in leisure and nature just taking its course independently. This poem was mentioned in Raymond Williams' The Country and the City. This acknowledgment of Herrick's work is appropriate, as both Williams and Herrick accentuate the importance of labor in the pastoral lifestyle.

The pastoral elegy is a subgenre that uses pastoral elements to lament a death or loss. The most famous pastoral elegy in English is John Milton's "Lycidas" (1637), written on the death of Edward King, a fellow student at Cambridge University. Milton used the form both to explore his vocation as a writer and to attack what he saw as the abuses of the Church. Also included is Thomas Gray's Elegy Written in a Country Churchyard (1750).

Alexander Pushkin frequently used the pastoral form in his poetry. Examples include Reason and Love, written in the tradition of French pastoral poetry and The Singer.

The formal English pastoral continued to flourish during the 18th century, eventually dying out at the end. One notable example of an 18th-century work is Alexander Pope's Pastorals (1709). In this work Pope imitates Edmund Spenser's Shepheardes Calendar, while utilizing classical names and allusions aligning him with Virgil. In 1717, Pope's Discourse on Pastoral Poetry was published as a preface to Pastorals. In this work Pope sets standards for pastoral literature and critiques many popular poets, one of whom is Spenser, along with his contemporary opponent Ambrose Philips. During this time period, Ambrose Philips, who is often overlooked because of Pope, modeled his poetry after the native English form of pastoral, employing it as a medium to express the true nature and longing of man. He strove to write in this fashion to conform to what he thought was the original intent of pastoral literature. As such, he centered his themes around the simplistic life of the Shepherd, and, personified the relationship that humans once had with nature. John Gay, who came a little later, was criticized for his poem's artificiality by Doctor Johnson and attacked for their lack of realism by George Crabbe, who attempted to give a true picture of rural life in his poem The Village.

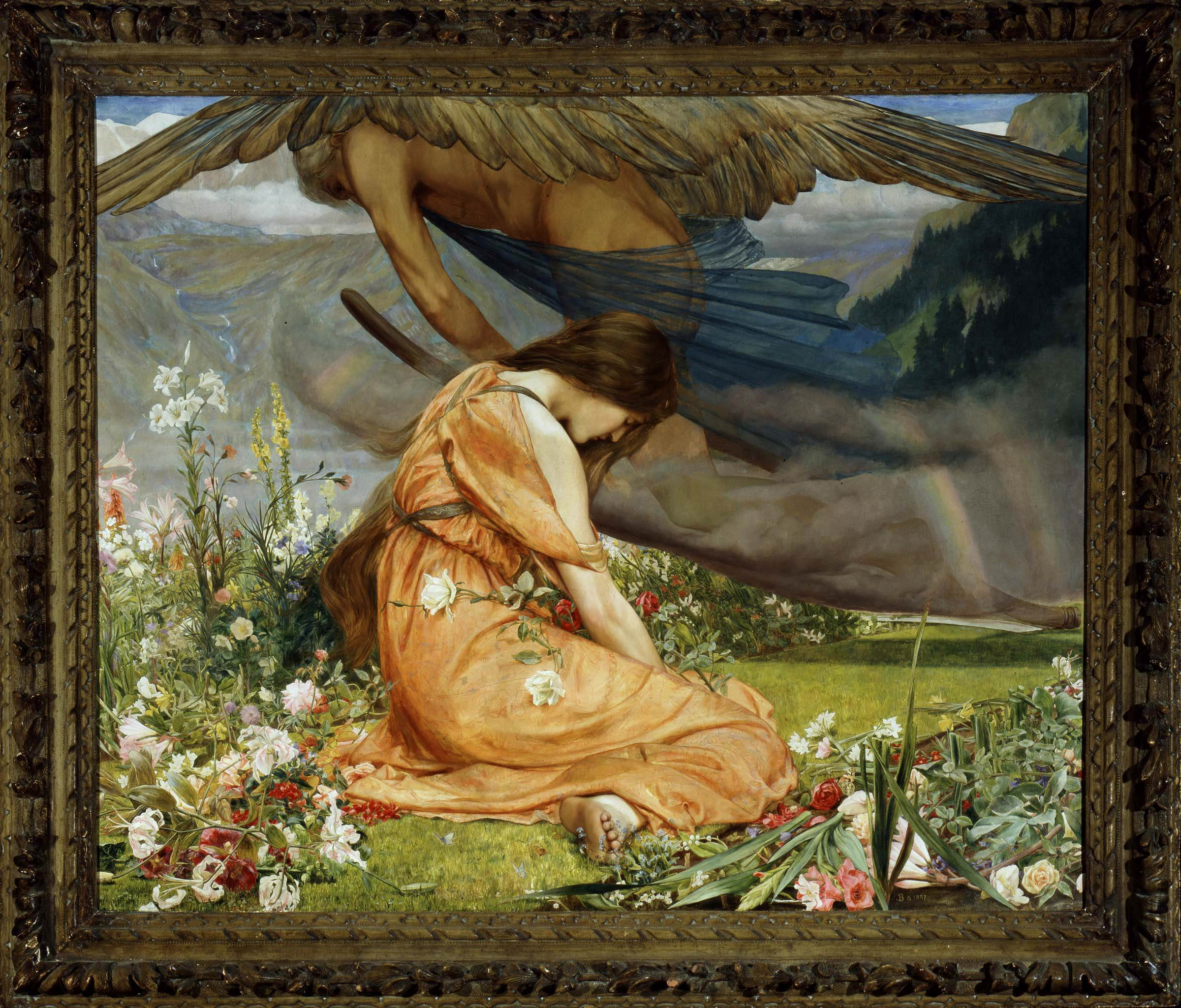
The Garden of Adonis – Amoretta and Time by John Dickson Batten, 1877, illustrating The Faerie Queene

In 1590, Edmund Spenser also composed the famous pastoral epic The Faerie Queene, in which he employs the pastoral mode to accentuate the charm, lushness, and splendor of the poem's (super)natural world. Spenser alludes to the pastoral continuously throughout the work and also uses it to create allegory in his poem, with the characters as well as with the environment, both of which are meant to have symbolic meaning in the real world. It is of six 'books' only, though Spenser intended to write twelve. He wrote the poem primarily to honor Queen Elizabeth. William Cowper addressed the artificiality of the fast-paced city life in his poems Retirement (1782) and The Winter Nosegay (1782). Pastoral nevertheless survived as a mood rather than a genre, as can be seen from such works as Matthew Arnold's Thyrsis (1867), a lament on the death of his fellow poet Arthur Hugh Clough. Robert Burns can be read as a Pastoral poet for his nostalgic portrayals of rural Scotland and simple farm life in To A Mouse and The Cotter's Saturday Night. Burns explicitly addresses the Pastoral form in his Poem on Pastoral Poetry. In this he champions his fellow Scot Allan Ramsey as the best Pastoral poet since Theocritus.

Another subgenre is the Edenic Pastoral, which alludes to the perfect relationship between God, man, and nature in the Garden of Eden. It typically includes biblical symbols and imagery. In 1645 John Milton wrote L'Allegro, which translates as the happy person. It is a celebration of Mirth personified, who is the child of love and revelry. It was originally composed to be a companion poem to, Il Penseroso, which celebrates a life of melancholy and solitude. Milton's, On the Morning of Christ's Nativity (1629) blends Christian and pastoral imagery.

==== Pastoral epic ====
Milton is perhaps best known for his epic Paradise Lost, one of the few pastoral epics ever written. A notable part of Paradise Lost is book IV, where he chronicles Satan's trespass into Paradise. Milton's iconic descriptions of the garden are shadowed by the fact that we see it from Satan's perspective and are thus led to commiserate with him. Milton elegantly works through a presentation of Adam and Eve's pastorally idyllic, eternally fertile living conditions and focuses upon their stewardship of the garden. He gives much focus to the fruit bearing trees and Adam and Eve's care of them, sculpting an image of pastoral harmony. However, Milton in turn continually comes back to Satan, constructing him as a character the audience can easily identify with and perhaps even like. Milton creates Satan as character meant to destabilize the audience’s understanding of themselves and the world around them. Through this mode, Milton is able to create a working dialogue between the text and his audience about the "truths" they hold for themselves.

=== Pastoral romances ===
Italian writers invented a new genre, the pastoral romance, which mixed pastoral poems with a fictional narrative in prose. Although there was no classical precedent for the form, it drew some inspiration from ancient Greek novels set in the countryside, such as Daphnis and Chloe. The most influential Italian example of the form was Sannazzaro's Arcadia (1504). The vogue for the pastoral romance spread throughout Europe producing such notable works as Bernardim Ribeiro "Menina e Moça" (1554) in Portuguese, Montemayor's Diana (1559) in Spain, Sir Philip Sidney's Arcadia (1590) in England, and Honoré d'Urfé's L'Astrée (1607–27) in France.

=== Pastoral plays ===
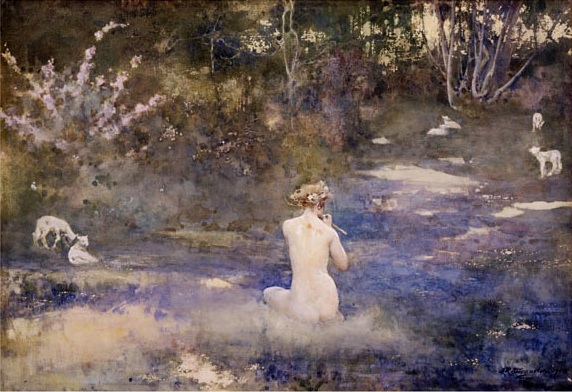
A Pastoral (watercolour, 1905) by John Reinhard Weguelin

Pastoral drama also emerged in Renaissance Italy. Again, there was little Classical precedent, with the possible exception of Greek satyr plays. Poliziano's Orfeo (1480) shows the beginnings of the new form, but it reached its zenith in the late 16th century with Tasso's Aminta (1573), Isabella Andreini's Mirtilla (1588), and Guarini's Il pastor fido (1590). John Lyly's Endimion (1579) brought the Italian-style pastoral play to England. John Fletcher's The Faithful Shepherdess, Ben Jonson's The Sad Shepherd and Sidney's The Lady of May are later examples. Some of Shakespeare's plays contain pastoral elements, most notably As You Like It (whose plot was derived from Thomas Lodge's pastoral romance Rosalynde) and The Winter's Tale, of which Act 4 Scene 4 is a lengthy pastoral digression.

The forest in As You Like It can be seen as a place of pastoral idealization, where life is simpler and purer, and its inhabitants live more closely to each other, nature and God than their urban counterparts. However, Shakespeare plays with the bounds of pastoral idealization. Throughout the play, Shakespeare employs various characters to illustrate pastoralism. His protagonists Rosalind and Orlando metaphorically depict the importance of the coexistence of realism and idealism, or urban and rural life. While Orlando is absorbed in the ideal, Rosalind serves as a mediator, bringing Orlando back down to reality and embracing the simplicity of pastoral love. She is the only character throughout the play who embraces and appreciates both the real and idealized life and manages to make the two ideas coexist. Therefore, Shakespeare explores city and country life as being appreciated through the coexistence of the two.

=== Pastoral science fiction ===
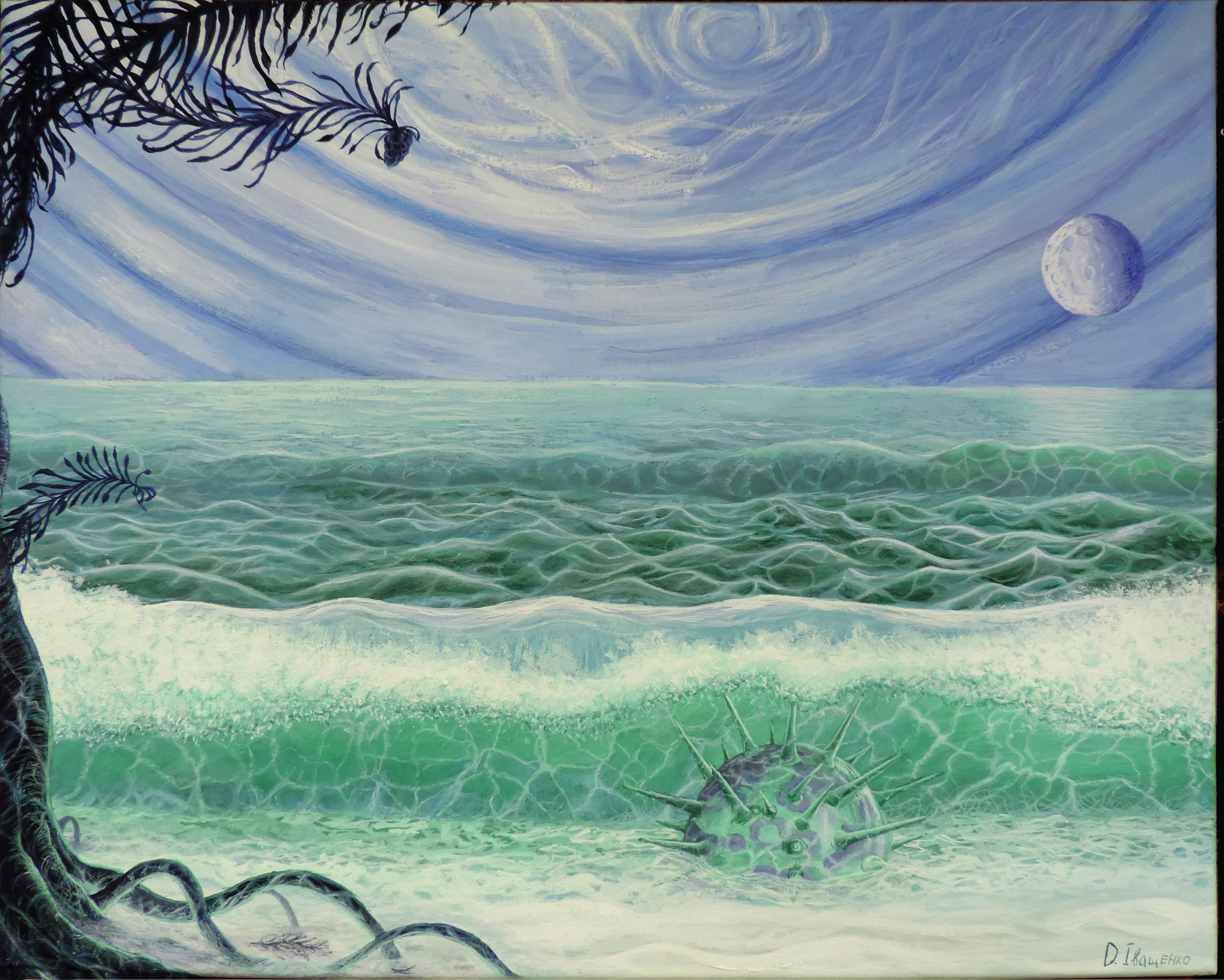
A gouache painting depicting an imaginary scene on a watery moon of a ringed exoplanet (painting by Dmytro Ivashchenko).

Pastoral science fiction is a subgenre of science fiction which uses bucolic, rural settings, like other forms of pastoral literature. Since it is a subgenre of science fiction, authors may set stories either on Earth or another habitable planet or moon, sometimes including a terraformed planet or moon. Unlike most genres of science fiction, pastoral science fiction works downplay the role of futuristic technologies. In the 1950s and 1960s, Clifford Simak wrote stories about rural people who have contact with extraterrestrial beings who hide their alien identity.

Pastoral science fiction stories typically show a reverence for the land, its life-giving food harvests, the cycle of the seasons, and the role of the community. While fertile agrarian environments on Earth or Earth-like planets are common settings, some works may be set in ocean or desert planets or habitable moons. The rural dwellers, such as farmers and small-townspeople, are depicted sympathetically, albeit with the tendency to portray them as conservative and suspicious of change. The simple, peaceful rural life is often contrasted with the negative aspects of noisy, dirty, fast-paced cities. Some works take a Luddite tone, criticizing mechanization and industrialization and showing the ills of urbanization and over-reliance on advanced technologies.

=== Post-pastoral, urban pastoral and other variants ===
In 1994, British literature professor Terry Gifford proposed the concept of a "post-pastoral" subgenre. By appending the prefix "post-", Gifford does not intend this to refer to "after" but rather to the sense of "reaching beyond" the contraints of the pastoral genre, while continuing the core conceptual elements that have defined the pastoral tradition. Gifford states that the post-pastoral is "best used to describe works that successfully suggest a collapse of the human/nature divide whilst being aware of the problematics involved", noting that it is "more about connection than the disconnections essential to the pastoral". He gives examples of post-pastoral works, including Cormac McCarthy's The Road (2006), Margaret Atwood's The Year of the Flood (2009) and Maggie Gee's The Ice People (1999), and he points out that these works "raise questions of ethics, sustenance and sustainability that might exemplify [Leo] Marx's vision of the pastoral needing to find new forms in the face of new conditions".

Gifford states that British eco-critics such as Greg Garrard have used the "post-pastoral" concept, as well as two other variants: "gay pastoral", the seemingly contradictory "urban pastoral" and "radical pastoral". Gifford lists further examples of pastoral variants, which he calls "prefix-pastoral[s]": "postmodern pastoral,...hard pastoral, soft pastoral, Buell's revolutionary lesbian feminist pastoral, black pastoral, ghetto pastoral, frontier pastoral, militarized pastoral, domestic pastoral and, most recently, a specifically 'Irish pastoral'".

In 2014, The Cambridge Companion to the City in Literature had a chapter on the urban pastoral subgenre.

== Pastoral music ==
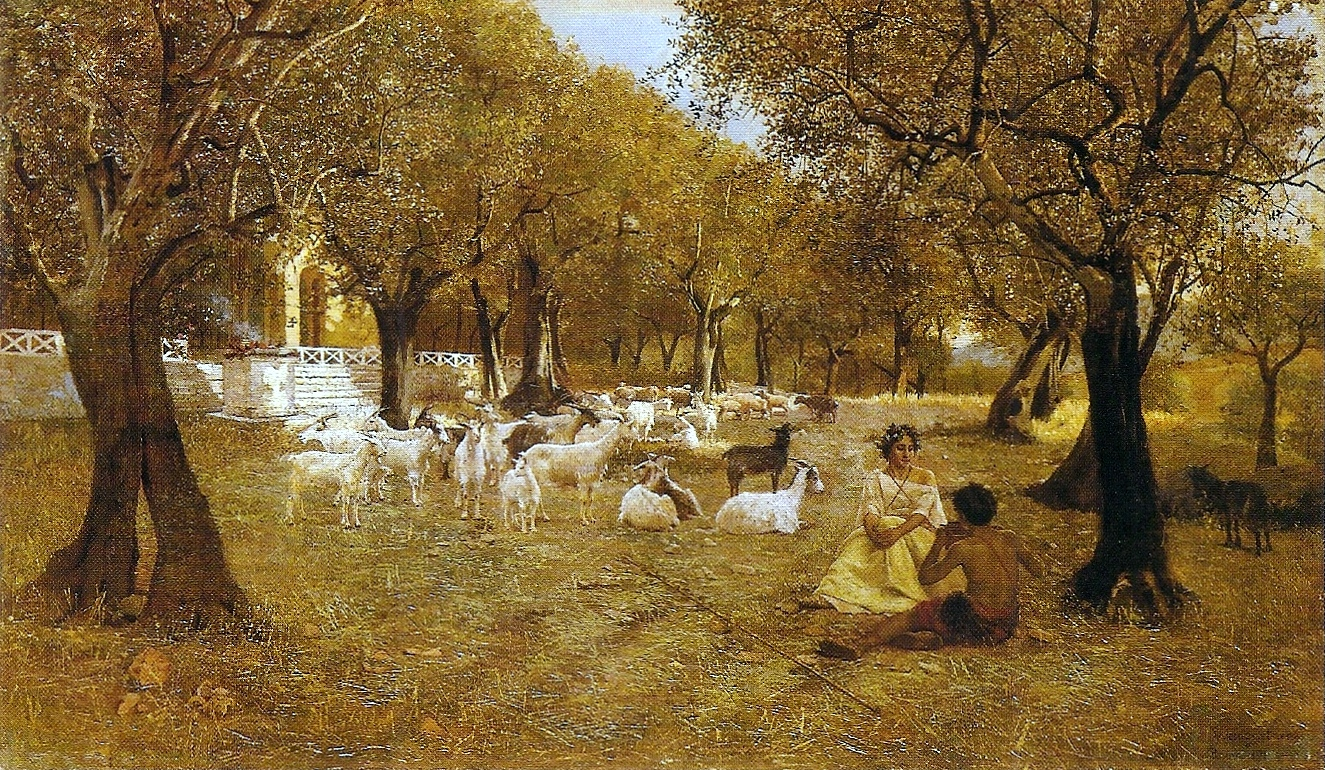
Daphnis and Chloe by Pedro Weingärtner, Brazilian, 1891. This is an ancient Greek pastoral novel, one of the most popular pastoral subjects in music and art since the Renaissance

Theocritus's Idylls include strophic songs and musical laments, and, as in Homer, his shepherds often play the syrinx, or pan flute, which is considered a quintessentially pastoral instrument. Virgil's Eclogues were performed as sung mime in the 1st century, and there is evidence of the pastoral song as a legitimate genre of classical times.

The pastoral genre was a significant influence in the development of opera. After settings of pastoral poetry in the pastourelle genre by the troubadours, Italian poets and composers became increasingly drawn to the pastoral. Musical settings of pastoral poetry became increasingly common in first polyphonic and then monodic madrigals: these later led to the cantata and the serenata, in which pastoral themes remained on a consistent basis. Partial musical settings of Giovanni Battista Guarini's Il pastor fido were highly popular: the texts of over 500 madrigals were taken from this one play alone. Tasso's Aminta was also a favourite. As opera developed, the dramatic pastoral came to the fore with such works as Jacopo Peri's Dafne and, most notably, Monteverdi's L'Orfeo. Pastoral opera remained popular throughout the 17th-century, and not just in Italy, as is shown by the French genre of pastorale héroïque, Englishman Henry Lawes's music for Milton's Comus (not to mention John Blow's Venus and Adonis), and Spanish zarzuela. At the same time, Italian and German composers developed a genre of vocal and instrumental pastorals, distinguished by certain stylistic features, associated with Christmas Eve.

The pastoral, and parodies of the pastoral, continued to play an important role in musical history throughout the 18th and 19th centuries. John Gay may have satirized the pastoral in The Beggar's Opera, but also wrote an entirely sincere libretto for Handel's Acis and Galatea. Rousseau's Le Devin du village draws on pastoral roots, and Metastasio's libretto Il re pastore was set over 30 times, most famously by Mozart. Rameau was an outstanding exponent of French pastoral opera. Beethoven also wrote his famous Pastoral Symphony, avoiding his usual musical dynamism in favour of relatively slow rhythms. More concerned with psychology than description, he labelled the work "more the expression of feeling than [realistic] painting". The pastoral also appeared as a feature of grand opera, most particularly in Meyerbeer's operas: often composers would develop a pastoral-themed "oasis", usually in the centre of their work. Notable examples include the shepherd's "alte Weise" from Wagner's Tristan und Isolde, or the pastoral ballet occupying the middle of Tchaikovsky's The Queen of Spades. The 20th-century continued to bring new pastoral interpretations, particularly in ballet, such as Maurice Ravel's Daphnis et Chloé, Nijinsky's use of Debussy's Prélude à l'après-midi d'un faune, and Stravinsky's Le sacre du printemps and Les Noces.

The Pastorale is a form of Italian folk song still played in the regions of Southern Italy where the zampogna continues to thrive. They generally sound like a slowed down version of a tarantella, as they encompass many of the same melodic phrases. The pastorale on the zampogna can be played by a solo zampogna player, or in some regions can be accompanied by the piffero (also commonly called a ciaramella, 'pipita', or bifora), which is a primitive key-less double reed oboe type instrument.

== Pastoral art ==
Idealised pastoral landscapes appear in Hellenistic and Roman wall paintings. Interest in the pastoral as a subject for art revived in Renaissance Italy, partly inspired by the descriptions of pictures Jacopo Sannazaro included in his Arcadia. The Pastoral Concert in the Louvre attributed to Giorgione or Titian is perhaps the most famous painting in this style. Later, French artists were also attracted to the pastoral, notably Claude, Poussin (e.g., Et in Arcadia ego) and Watteau (in his Fêtes galantes). The Kermesse or Fête champêtre (village festivity), with scenes of country people dancing was a popular subject in Flemish painting. Thomas Cole has a series of paintings titled The Course of Empire, and the second of these paintings (shown on the right) depicts the perfect pastoral setting.

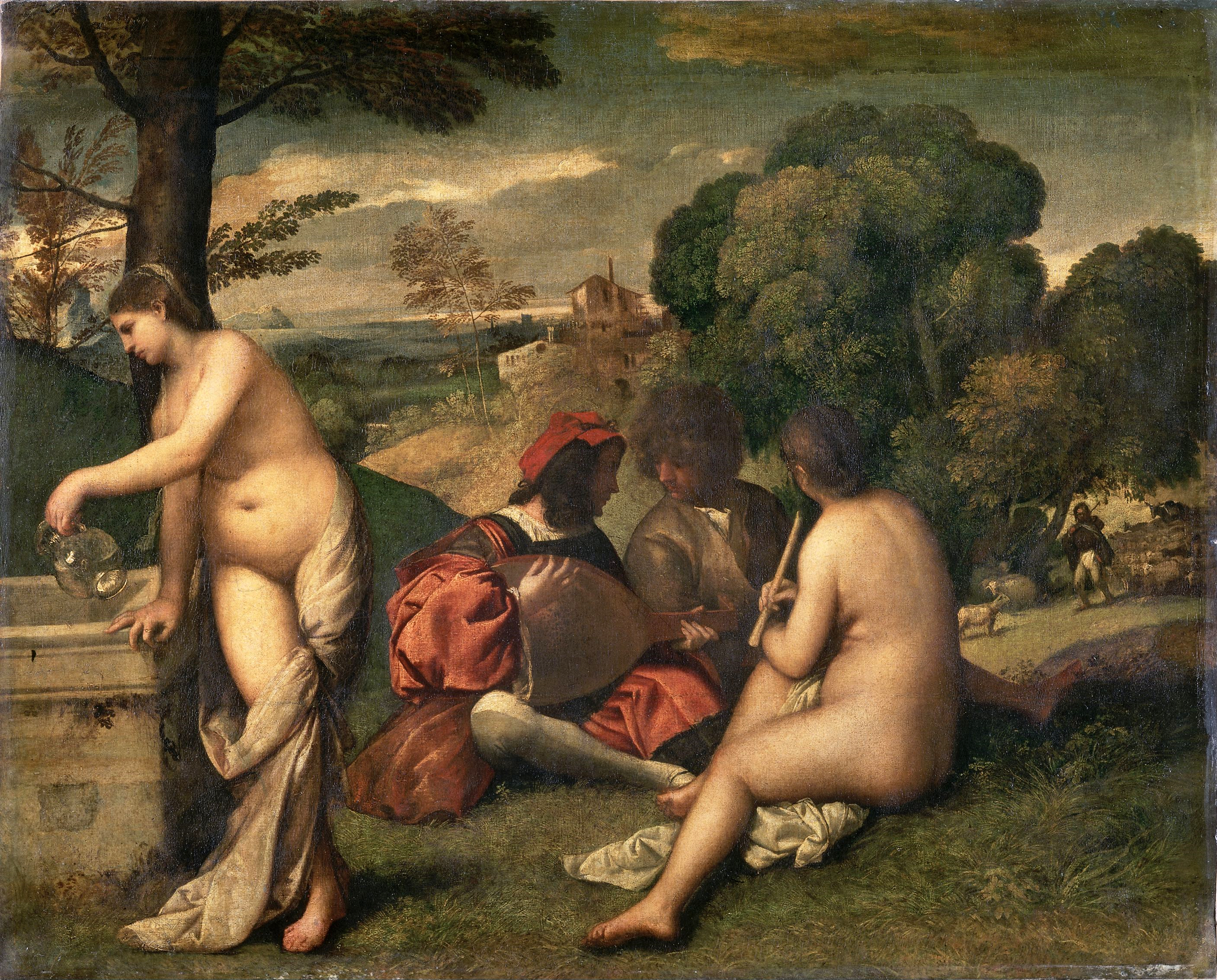
Giorgione or Titian, Pastoral Concert, c. 1509, Louvre.

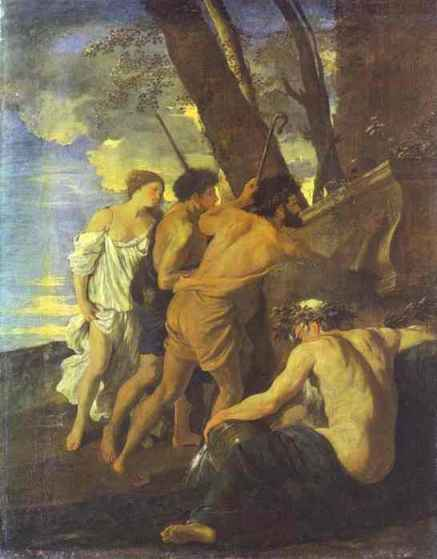
Nicolas Poussin Arcadian Shepherds, 1627, Chatsworth House

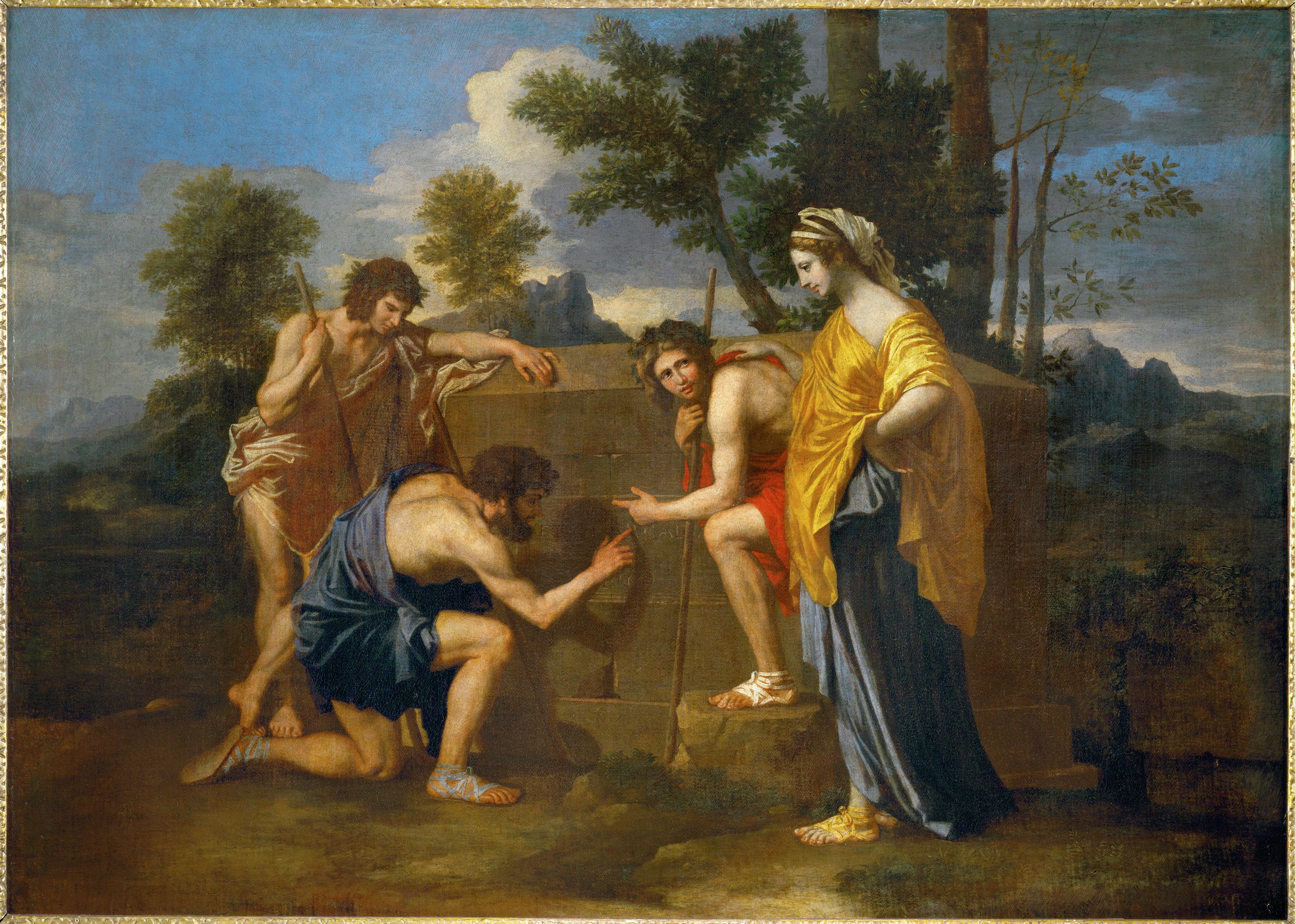
Nicolas Poussin Et in Arcadia ego, 1637-1638, Louvre

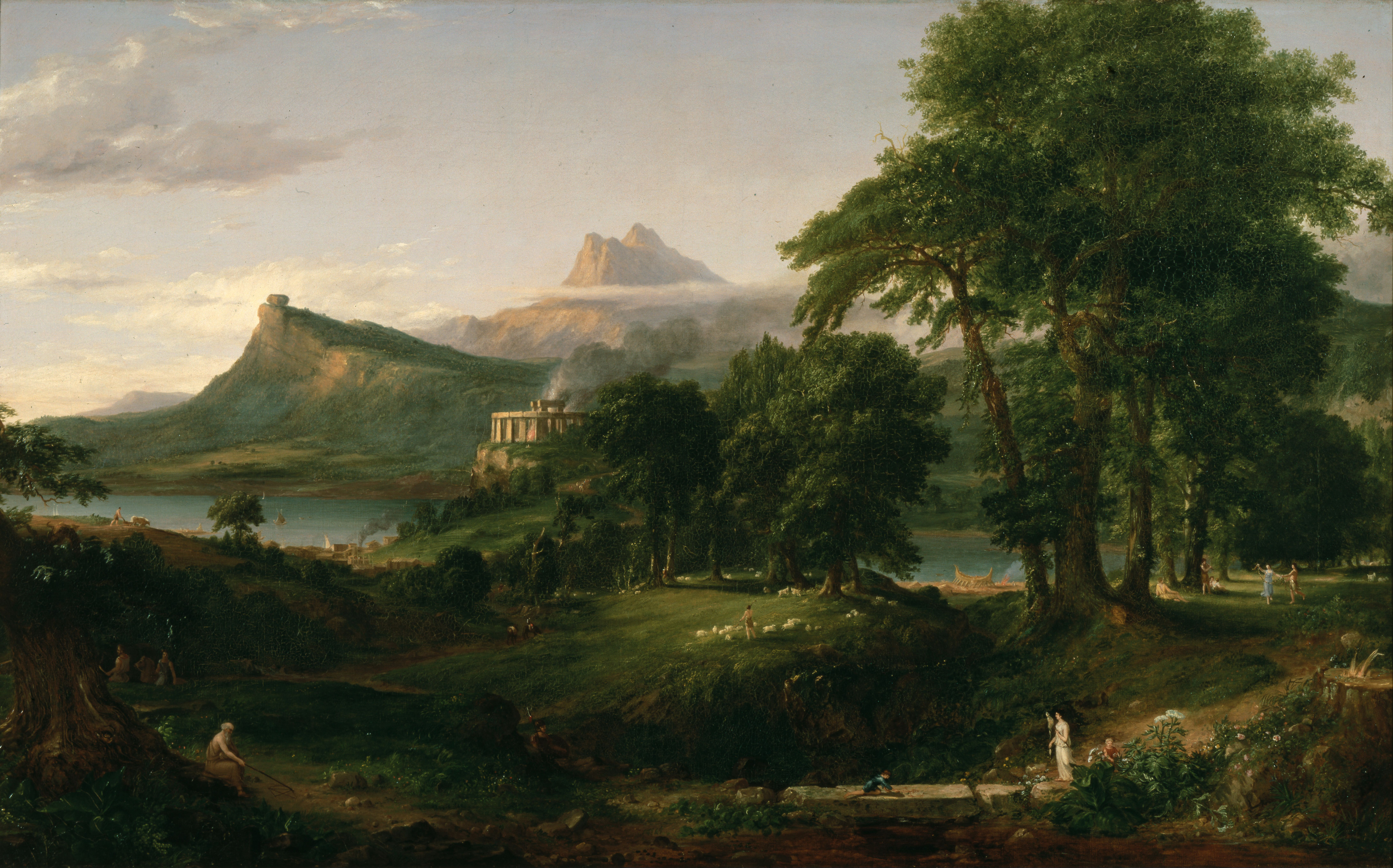
Thomas Cole, The Course of Empire, The Arcadia or Pastoral State, 1834

== Critical approaches ==
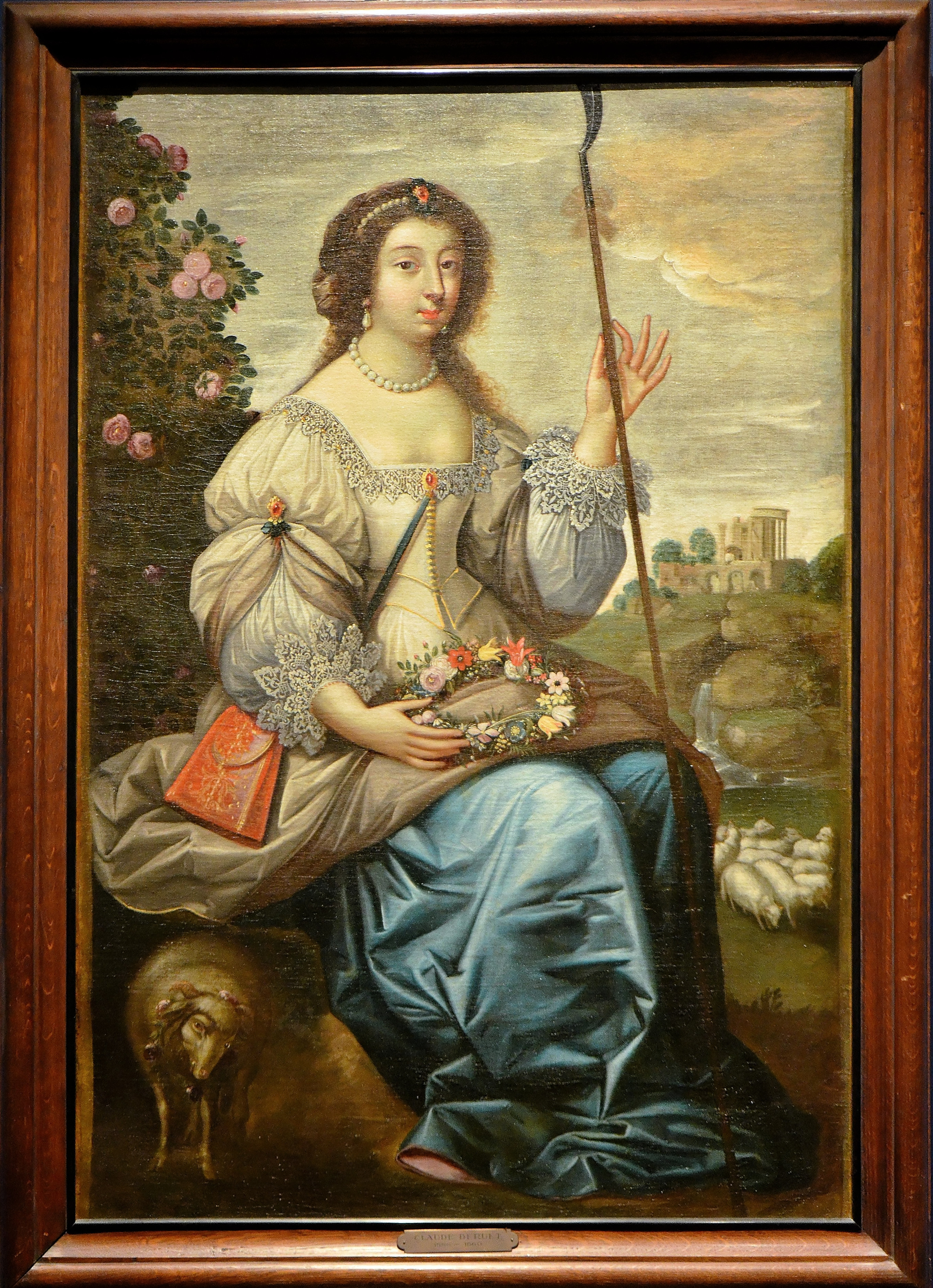
The courtier Julie d'Angennes poses for her portrait by Claude Deruet as the shepherdess Astrea, c. 1640

In the past four hundred years, a range of writers have worked on theorizing the nature of pastoral. These include Friedrich Schiller, George Puttenham, William Empson, Frank Kermode, Raymond Williams, Renato Poggioli, Annabel Patterson, Paul Alpers, and Ken Hiltner. George Puttenham was one of the first Pastoral theorists. He did not see the form as merely a recording of a prior rustic way of life but a guise for political discourse, which other forms had previously neglected. The Pastoral, he writes, has a didactic duty to "contain and enforme morall discipline for the amendment of mans behaviour".

Friedrich Schiller linked the Pastoral to childhood and a childlike simplicity. For Schiller, we perceive in nature an "image of our infancy irrevocably past". Sir William Empson spoke of the ideal of Pastoral as being embedded in varying degrees of ambivalence, and yet, for all the apparent dichotomies, and contradicting elements found within it, he felt there was a unified harmony within it. He refers to the pastoral process as 'putting the complex into the simple.' Empson argues that "... good proletarian art is usually Covert Pastoral", and uses Soviet Russia's propaganda about the working class as evidence. Empson also emphasizes the importance of the double plot as a tool for writers to discuss a controversial topic without repercussions.

Raymond Williams argues that the foundation of the pastoral lies in the idea that the city is a highly urban, industrialized center that has removed us from the peaceful life we once had in the countryside. However, he states that this is really a "myth functioning as a memory" that literature has created in its representations of the past. As a result, when society evolves and looks back to these representations, it considers its own present as the decline of the simple life of the past. He then discusses how the city's relationship with the country affected the economic and social aspects of the countryside. As the economy became a bigger part of society, many country newcomers quickly realized the potential and monetary value that lay in the untouched land. Furthermore, this new system encouraged a social stratification in the countryside. With the implementation of paper money came a hierarchy in the working system, as well as the "inheritance of titles and making of family names".

Poggioli was concerned with how death reconciled itself with the pastoral, and thus came up with a loose categorization of death in the pastoral as 'funeral elegy', the most important tropes of which he cites as religion (embodied by Pan); friendship; allegory;and poetic and musical calling. He concedes though that such a categorization is open to much misinterpretation. As well, Poggioli focused on the idea that Pastoral was a nostalgic and childish way of seeing the world. In The Oaten Flue, he claims that the shepherd was looked up to was because they were "an ideal kind of leisure class."

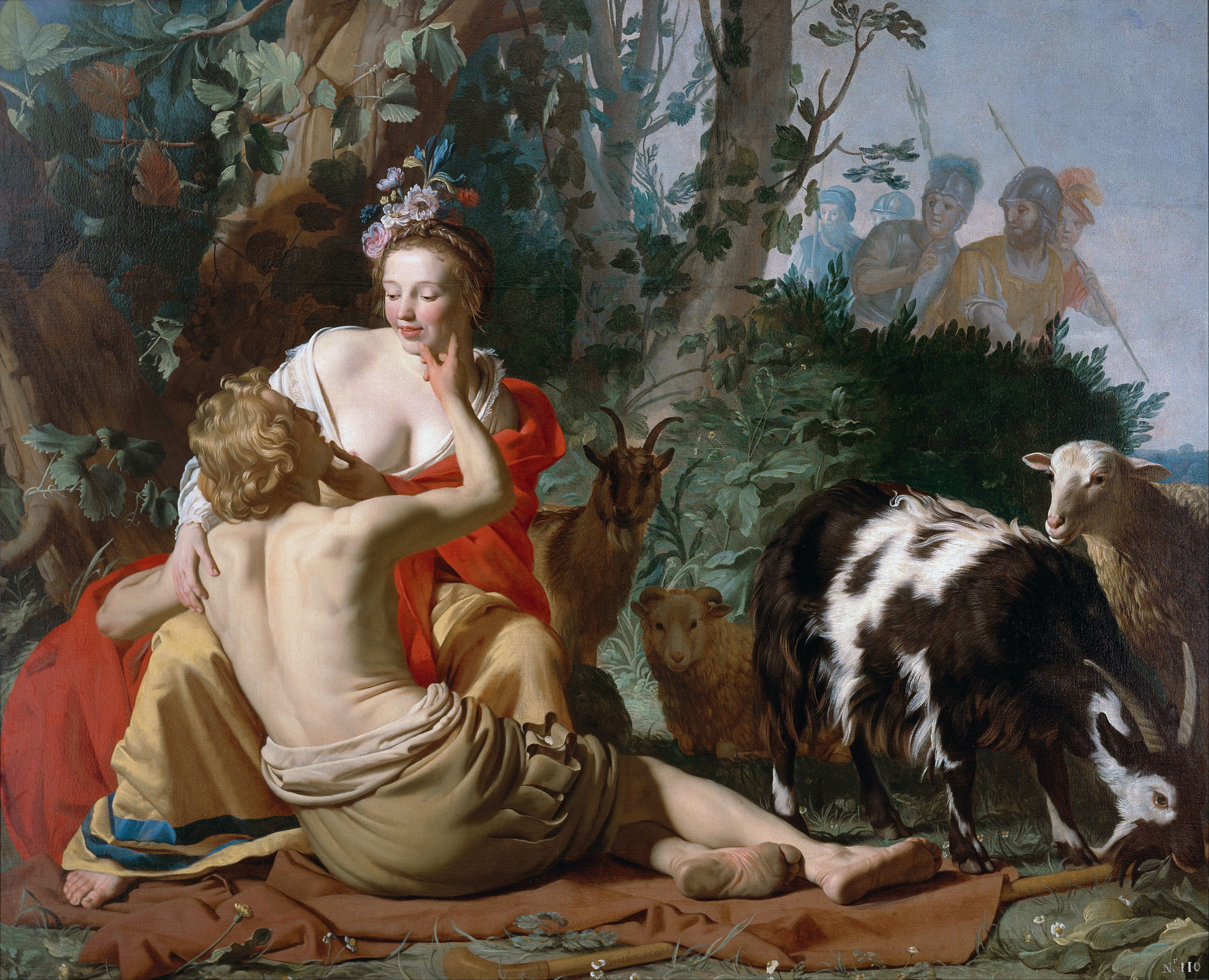
Gerard van Honthorst, Granida and Daifilo, characters from a Dutch work, 1625

Frank Kermode discusses the pastoral within the historical context of the English Renaissance. His first condition of pastoral poetry is that it is an urban product. Kermode establishes that the pastoral is derived as an opposition between two modes of living, in the country and in the city. London was becoming a modern metropolis before the eyes of its citizens. The result of this large-scale urban sprawl left the people with a sense of nostalgia for their country way of living. His next argument focuses on the artificiality of poetry, drawing upon fellow theorist, Puttenham.

Kermode elaborates on this and says, "the cultivated, in their artificial way, reflect upon and describe, for their own ends, the natural life". Kermode wants us to understand that the recreation or reproduction of the natural is in itself artificial. Kermode elaborates on this in terms of imitation, describing it as "one of the fundamental laws of literary history" because it "gives literary history a meaning in terms of itself, and provides the channels of literary tradition". Kermode goes on to explain about the works of Virgil and Theocritus as progenitors of the pastoral. Later poets would draw on these earlier forms of pastoral, elaborating on them to fit their own social context. As the pastoral was becoming more modern, it shifted into the form of Pastourelle. This is the first time that the pastoral really deals with the subject of love.

Annabel Patterson emphasizes many important ideas in her work, Pastoral and Ideology. One of these is that the pastoral mode, especially in the later 18th century, was interpreted in vastly different ways by different groups of people. As a result, distinctive illustrations emerged from these groups which were all variations of the understanding of Virgil's Eclogues. Patterson explains that Servius' Commentary is essential to understanding the reception of Virgil's Eclogues. The commentary discusses how poets used analogy in their writings to indirectly express the corruption within the church and government to the public. When speaking of post-Romanticism, it is imperative to take into consideration the influence and effect of Robert Frost on pastoral ideology. His poem, Build Soil is a critique of war and also a suggestion that pastoral, as a literary mode, should not place emphasis on social and political issues, but should rather, as Patterson says, "turn in upon itself, and replace reformist instincts with personal growth and regeneration". William Wordsworth was a highly respected poet in the 1800s and his poem, The Prelude, partly published in 1805, was an excellent example of what a dream of a new golden age might materialize as or look like.

Paul Alpers, in his 1996 book, What is Pastoral?, describes the recurring plot of pastoral literature as the lives of shepherds. With William Empson's notion of placing the complex into the simple, Alpers thus critically defines pastoral as a means of allegory. Alpers also classifies pastoral as a mode of literature, as opposed to a genre, and he defines the attitude of pastoral works maintaining a humble relationship with nature. Alpers also defines pastoral convention as the act of bringing together, and authors use this to discuss loss. He says the speakers in pastoral works are simple herdsmen dramatized in pastoral encounters.

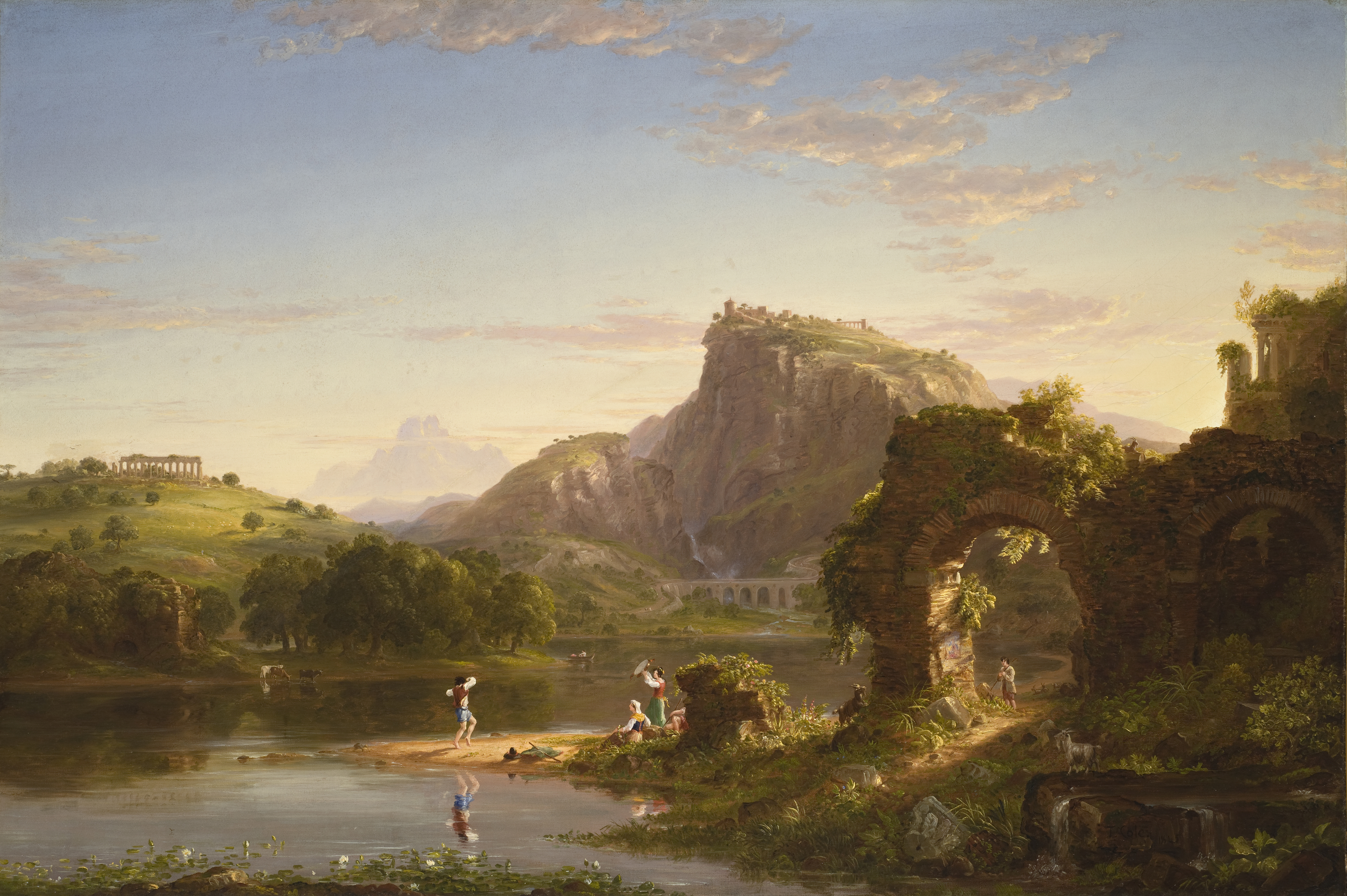
L'Allegro by Thomas Cole, evoking the poem by John Milton

However, authors like Herrick changed the herdsmen to nymphs, maidens, and flowers. Thus, achieving a mode of simplicity but also giving objects voice. This is done by personifying objects like flowers. Moreover, authors that do this in their works are giving importance to the unimportant. Alpers talks about pastoral lyrics and love poems in particular. He says "a lyric allows its speaker to slip in and out of pastoral guise and reveal directly the sophistication which prompted him to assume it in the first place″. In other words, he claims pastorals lyrics have both pastoral and not pastoral characteristics, perhaps like in the comparisons between urban and rural, but they always give importance to and enhance on the pastoral. Alpers talks about love poems and how they can be turned into pastoral poems simply by changing words like lover to shepherd. And he mentions Shakespeare as one of the authors who did this in his works. Furthermore, Alpers says the pastoral is not only about praise for the rural and the country side. For instance, Sidney dispraises the country life in The Garden. Pastoral can also include the urban, the court, and the social like in L'Allegro.

Alpers says that pastoral narration contradicts "normal" narrative motives and that there is a double aspect of pastoral narration: heroic poetry and worldly realities with narrative motives and conventions. And in respect to pastoral novels, Alpers says pastoral novels have different definitions and examples depending on the reader. Also, the pastoral novel differs from Theocritus and Virgil's works. He says there are pastoral novels of the country life, of the longing for the simple, and with nature as the protagonist. And says the literary category of pastoral novels is realistic and post-realistic fiction with a rural theme or subject based on traditional pastoral.

In What Else Is Pastoral?, Ken Hiltner argues that Renaissance pastoral poetry is more often a form of nature writing than critics like Paul Alpers and Annabel Patterson give it credit for. He explains that even though there is a general lack of lavish description in Renaissance pastoral, this is because they were beginning to use gestural strategies, and artists begin to develop an environmental consciousness as nature around them becomes endangered. Another argument presented in the book is that our current environmental crisis clearly has its roots in the Renaissance. To do this we are shown examples in Renaissance pastoral poetry that show a keen awareness of the urban sprawl of London contrasted to the countryside and historical records showing that many at the time were aware of the issue of urban growth and attempted to stop it.

== See also ==
- Arcadia (utopia)
- American Pastoral
- Cottagecore
- Pastoral (theatre of Soule) – Folk theatre genre from the Basque Country
- Piscatorial eclogue
