= Robene and Makyne =

Poem by Robert Henryson

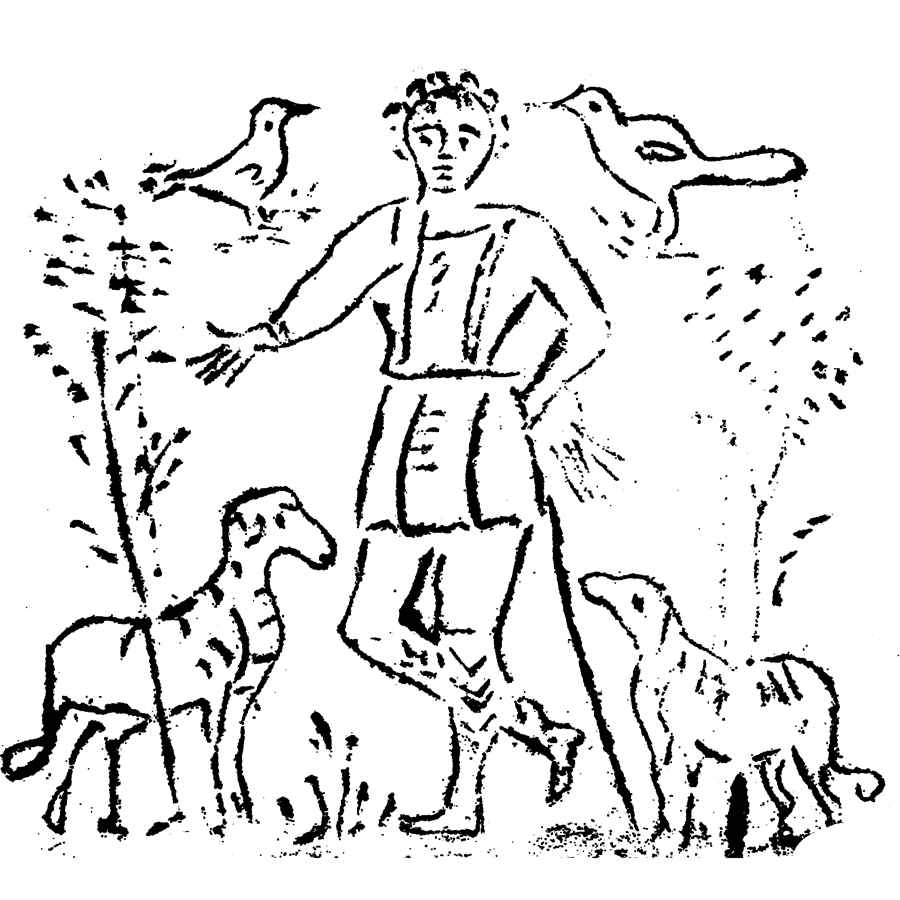
Shepherd. Click image for picture information.

"Robene and Makyne" is a short poem by the 15th-century Scottish makar Robert Henryson. It is an early written example of Scottish pastourelle, derived from the ballad stanza form.

== Origins and structure ==
Robene and Makyn by Charles Hodge Mackie, published in The Evergreen: A Northern Seasonal, The Book of Spring, Patrick Geddes and Colleagues (1895)

Robene and Makyne (also spelt Mawkin) are stock names for peasant characters, a shepherd and a country maiden. Henryson presents the two characters in the sparest of terms and much in the poem has to be inferred. Strictly speaking, nothing in the text verifies precisely who Makyne might be. In the first half of the poem, she declares longstanding love for Robene, but he is indifferent to her feelings. Minds quickly change and in the closing arc the hopeless declaration is from Robene. This simple dramatic reversal comes at the golden section. Makyne's rejection of Robene is final.

Henryson's writing suggests subtexts around the issue of chastity, a material issue in the late medieval Church and of possible relevance in the poet's own life. The spareness allows different and perhaps dissonant readings to be simultaneously present, but any "allegorical" implications are present without pretentiousness or loss of authentic feeling and the poem stands as a simple comic creation with a surprisingly wide range of emotion and intriguing tonal ambiguity.

The closure, peculiar in its effect, evokes feelings of emptiness and a sense of musical return.

== Extract ==
Stanzas 12 and 13 of "Robene and Makyne", where the first stanza is spoken by Makyne, followed by Robene:

"Robene, thow hes hard soung and say
In gestis and stories auld,
The man that will nocht quhen he may
Sall haif nocht quhen he wald.
I pray to Jesu every day
Mot eik thair cairis cauld
That first preiss with the to play
Be firth, forest or fawld."

"Makyne, the nicht is soft and dry,
The wedder is warme and fair,
And the grene woid rycht neir us by
To walk attour allquhair;
Thair ma na janglour us espy,
That is to lufe contrair;
Thairin, Makyne, bath ye and I
Unsene we ma repair."

== See also ==
- "The Baffled Knight"
- "The Hireling Shepherd"
