= Maljković =

Maljković (Serbian: Маљковић) is a South Slavic surname. Notable people with the surname include:

- Božidar Maljković (born 1952), Serbian basketball coach
- Marina Maljković (born 1981), Serbian basketball coach
- Vladimir Maljković (born 1982), Croatian football player

== See also ==
- Malkovich
- Malkoçoğlu
