= The Tale of Orpheus and Erudices his Quene =

The Tale of Orpheus and Erudices his Quene is a poem by the Scottish Northern Renaissance poet Robert Henryson that adapts and develops the Greek myth which most famously appears in two classic Latin texts, the Metamorphoses of Ovid and the Georgics of Virgil.

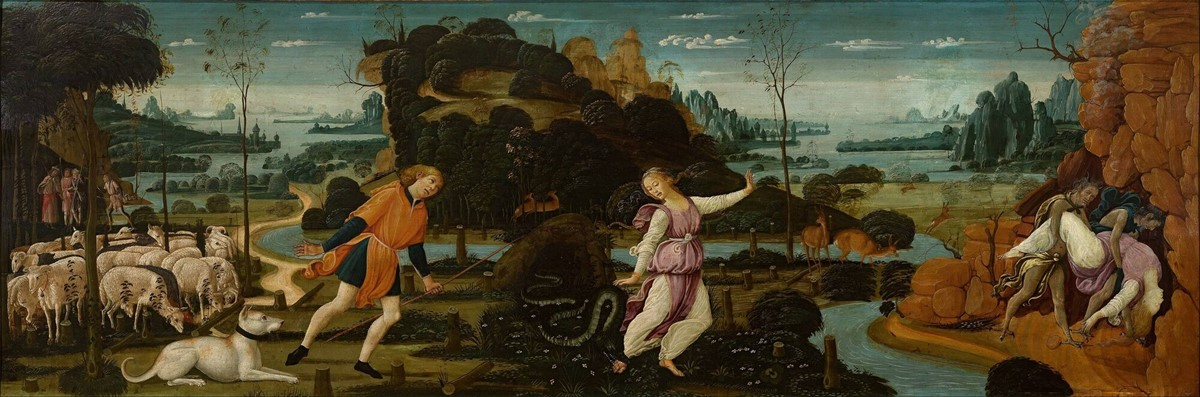
Jacopo del Sellaio, Orpheus and Eurydice, c.1480
