= Apathy (disambiguation) =

Apathy is a lack of emotion, motivation, or enthusiasm, deriving from the ancient Greek term Apatheia.

Apathy may also refer to:

- Apathy (rapper), an underground rapper
- Stephan Apáthy (István Apathy, 1863–1922), Hungarian zoologist
- "Apathy", a song by the industrial rock band KMFDM
- Apathy, a defunct grunge band fronted by Luke Helder
- "Apathy is a Death Wish", a song by Story of the Year
- The Apathy, a type of antagonistic monster featured in the animated web series RWBY

== See also ==
- Apatheism, the attitude of apathy towards the existence or non-existence of God(s)
- Political apathy
