= Herbert Malkin =

English lawyer and cricketer

Herbert Charles Malkin (21 September 1836 – 18 August 1913) was an English lawyer and a cricketer who played first-class cricket for Cambridge University in 1858. He was born in Kolkata, then called Calcutta, in India and died at Corrybrough, Tomatin, Inverness-shire, Scotland.

== Life ==
Malkin was the son of Sir Benjamin Heath Malkin, a judge of the supreme court in Calcutta, who died only a year after Herbert was born. His grandfather was also named Benjamin Heath Malkin and was a writer and educator who brought the works of William Blake to public attention. Herbert Malkin was educated at Charterhouse School and at Trinity College, Cambridge, graduating from Cambridge University in 1859 with a Bachelor of Arts degree.

After graduating from Cambridge, Malkin worked for a time as a schoolmaster at Charterhouse, his old school, before qualifying as a barrister. From 1871 he acted as Clerk of Public Bills in the Clerk of the Parliaments office in the House of Lords; from 1897 to his retirement in 1901 he had the title "chief clerk". From 1879 to 1897 he was responsible for the Annual Statutes publication which recorded new laws in the period before the codification of UK statutes under Halsbury's Statutes, and he served on committees dealing with statute law revision. He was also a local politician, being a member of Kensington Borough Council and a Justice of the Peace for the City of London. He inherited a grouse moor estate in Scotland from an uncle and it was there that he died in 1913.

== Cricket ==
While at Cambridge, Malkin played several cricket matches for the university side, and two of them, both in 1858, have been judged to be of first-class status. He appears to have played as a batsman, though it is not known if he was right- or left-handed, and there is no evidence that he bowled; his only innings of note was a score of 27 made as an opening batsman in the match against the Cambridge Town Club in which he made his first-class debut. He continued to play minor cricket for amateur clubs, including Southgate Cricket Club, across the 1860s but played no more matches with first-class status.

== Family ==
Malkin married in 1879 Elizabeth Elliott, daughter of George Percy Elliott of Awliscombe. Herbert William Malkin was their only son.
