= Annabel Patterson =

Annabel M. Patterson (born August 9, 1936) is the Sterling Professor Emeritus of English at Yale University.

Born in England, Patterson emigrated to Canada in 1957. There she enrolled at the University of Toronto, where her B.A. work received the highest prize, the Governor General's Gold Medal. She received her M.A "with distinction" and her Ph.D. from the University of London in 1963 and 1965, respectively. Since then she has taught at Toronto, York University, the University of Maryland at College Park, and Duke University. In 1994 she moved to Yale as the Karl Young Professor of English, and was made Sterling Professor in 2001, and became a professor emerita in 2005. She was awarded an honorary degree from the University of Toronto in 2014.

She has written over 16 books and about 70 refereed articles on topics as varied as Holinshed’s Chronicles, eighteenth-century libel law, the reception of Virgil’s eclogues in Europe, editions of Aesop’s fables, censorship, liberalism, parliamentary history, as well as Shakespeare, Milton, Donne, John Locke, and of course Andrew Marvell, whose canon she helped reshape.

== Awards ==
Patterson was awarded a Guggenheim Fellowship (1983); a senior fellowship at the Society of Humanities, Cornell University (1983-1984); the Andrew Mellon Chair of the Humanities at Duke; a Mellon Fellowship, National Humanities Center; and a Mellon Emeritus Fellowship at Yale. She won the Harry Levin Comparative Literature prize (1987) for Pastoral and Ideology and the John Ben Snow Prize for Reading Holinshed’s Chronicles (1994). She was a fellow of the American Academy of Arts and Sciences (2000). In April 2008, Patterson delivered the Tanner Lectures on Human Values at the University of California, Berkeley. In 2014, she was awarded an honorary Doctor of Laws from the University of Toronto. She was president and honored scholar of the Milton Society of America in 2002.

== Publications ==
- “‘Our Mutual Friend’: Dickens as the Compleat Angler,” in Dickens Studies Annual (1970)

Hermogenes and the Renaissance: Seven Ideas of Style (Princeton: Princeton University Press, 1970)

- “Against Polarization: Literature and Politics in Marvell's Cromwell Poems,” in English Literary Renaissance 5, no. 2 (1975)
- “L’Allegro, Il Penseroso and Comus: The Logic of Recombination,” in Milton Quarterly 9 (1975)

Marvell and the Civic Crown (Princeton: Princeton University Press, 1978)

- “Wordsworth’s Georgic: Genre and Structure in The Excursion,” in The Wordsworth Circle 9, no. 2 (1978)
- “A Character of Andrew Marvell,” in English Language Notes 17 (1979)
- “Misinterpretable Donne: The Testimony of the Letters,” in John Donne Journal: Studies in the Age of Donne 1, nos.1-2 (1982)
- Censorship and Interpretation: the Conditions of Writing and Reading in Early Modern England (Madison: University of Wisconsin Press, 1984)

Roman Image (editor) (Baltimore: Johns Hopkins University Press, 1984)

- “The Country Gentleman: Howard, Marvell, and Dryden in the Theater of Politics,” in SEL: Studies in English Literature 1500–1900 25, no. 3 (1985)
- “Hard Pastoral: Frost, Wordsworth, and Modernish Poetics,” in Criticism 29, no. 2 (1987)
- Pastoral and Ideology: Virgil to Valéry (Berkeley: University of California Press, 1987)
- “‘The Very Age and Body of the Time His Form and Pressure’: Rehistoricizing Shakespeare's Theater,” in New Literary History 20, no. 1 (1988)
- Shakespeare and the Popular Voice (Oxford, UK and Cambridge MA: B. Blackwell, 1989)
- “All Donne,” in Soliciting Interpretation: Literary Theory and Seventeenth-century English Poetry, edited by Elizabeth D. Harvey and Katharine Eisaman Maus (Chicago: University of Chicago Press, 1990)
- “Couples, Canons, and the Uncouth: Spenser-and-Milton in Educational Theory,” in Critical Inquiry 16, no. 4 (1990)
- “Teaching Against the Tradition,” in Approaches to Teaching the Metaphysical Poets, edited by Sidney Gottlieb (New York: Modern Language Association of America, 1990)
- “Converging Disciplines at Duke,” in South Atlantic Quarterly 90, no. 1 (1991)
- Fables of Power: Aesopian Writing and Political History (Durham: Duke University Press, 1991)
- John Milton (editor) (London and New York: Longman, 1992)
- “Imagining New Worlds: Milton, Galileo and the Good Old Cause,” in The Witness of Times: Manifestations of Ideology in Seventeenth Century England, edited by Katherine Z. Keller and Gerald J. Schiffhors (Pittsburgh: Duquesne University Press, 1993)
- “More Speech on Free Speech,” in Modern Language Quarterly 54, no. 1 (1993)
- Reading Between the Lines (Madison: University of Wisconsin Press, 1993)
- “Quod Oportet versus Quod Convenit: John Donne, Kingsman,” in Critical Essays on John Donne, edited by Arthur F. Marotti (New York: G.K. Hall; Toronto: Maxwell Macmillan Canada; New York: Maxwell Macmillan International, 1994)
- Andrew Marvell (Plymouth, UK: Northcote House in association with the British Council, 1994)
- Reading Holinshed’s Chronicles (Chicago: University of Chicago Press, 1994)
- “Intention,” in Critical Terms for Literary Study (1995)
- “Local Knowledge: ‘Popular’ Representation in Elizabethan Historiography,” in Place and Displacement in the Renaissance, edited by Alvin Vos (Binghamton, NY: Medieval & Renaissance Texts & Studies, 1995)
- The Most Excellent Historie of The Merchant of Venice (editor) (Hemel Hempstead, UK and Englewood Cliffs, NJ: Prentice Hall, Harvester Wheatsheaf, 1995)
- “Donne in Shadows: Pictures and Politics,” in John Donne Journal: Studies in the Age of Donne 16 (1997)
- Early Modern Liberalism (Cambridge, UK, and New York: Cambridge University Press, 1997)
- “Reading Between the Lines,” (with Lisa Schnell) in Seventeenth Century News 55, no. 3-4 (1997)
- The Trial of Nicholas Throckmorton (editor) (Toronto: Centre for Reformation and Renaissance Studies, 1998)
- Marvell: the Writer in Public Life (Essex, UK, and New York: Longman, 2000)
- Doctor! Doctor! Doctoral Studies in English in Twenty-first Century Britain (with Judie Newman) (Leicester: English Association, University of Leicester, 2001)
- "Milton, Marriage and Divorce," in A Companion to Milton, ed. Thomas N. Corns (Malden: Blackwell Publishing, 2001, 2003)
- “Catholic Communities and Their Art,” in Visions of Community in the Pre-modern World, edited by Nicholas Howe (Notre Dame, IN: University of Notre Dame Press, 2002)
- “‘Ideas seldom exist apart from practice’: Turning over Millennial New Leaves,” in The Journal of British Studies 41, no. 3 (2002)
- Nobody's Perfect: a New Whig Interpretation of History (New Haven: Yale University Press, 2002)
- “Inventing Postcolonialism: Edmund Burke's Paradise Lost and Regained,” in Milton and the Grounds of Contention, edited by Mark R. Kelley, Michael Lieb, and John T. Shawcross (Pittsburgh: Duquesne University of Press, 2003)
- The Prose Works of Andrew Marvell (New Haven: Yale University Press, 2003-)
- The Long Parliament of Charles II (New Haven: Yale University Press, 2008)
- “Oliver Arnold, The Third Citizen: Shakespeare's Theater and the Early Modern House of Commons,” in Modern Philology 107, no. 2 (2009)
- Milton's Words (Oxford: Oxford University Press, 2009)
- “Say First, What Cause?” in The Oxford Handbook of Literature and the English Revolution 1 (2012)
- John Milton (Hoboken, NJ: Taylor and Francis, 2014)
- Marvell: The Writer in Public Life (Oxfordshire, UK and New York: Routledge, 2014)
- The International Novel (New Haven: Yale University Press, 2015)
