= Herbert William Malkin =

British lawyer

Sir Herbert William Malkin GCMG CB KC
- Born: 17 April 1883; Kensington, London, UK
- Died: 4 July 1945 (aged 62); North Atlantic
- Education: Trinity College, Cambridge
- Years active: 1911–1945
- Known for: Legal Adviser to the UK Foreign Office
- Spouse: Margaret Burnet-Morris (m. 1913)

Sir Herbert William Malkin GCMG CB KC (1883–1945), sometimes known as William Malkin, was a British lawyer. He passed the bar at Inner Temple in 1907. He joined the foreign office in 1911, rising to become the Legal Adviser to the Foreign Office in 1929 until his death in an aeroplane crash in July 1945.

== Early life ==
He was born on 17 April 1883, the only son of Herbert Charles Malkin and his wife Elizabeth Elliott. He was educated at Charterhouse School before going on to Trinity College, Cambridge. There he gained a first in the Classical Tripos and four years after his being called to the Bar he joined the Foreign Office in 1911. He married Margaret Burnet-Morris in South Kensington on 8 July 1913.

== Foreign Office ==
=== Early years 1911–1914 ===
Between 1911 and 1914 Malkin worked on Anglo-American claims and attended a conference at Spitzbergen while working in partnership with Sir Cecil Herbert.

=== First World War ===
With the outbreak of the First World War, Malkin worked on questions surrounding neutrality and War Prize issues.

Following the armistice, Malkin attended four years of conferences, including the Lausanne and Washington naval conferences.

=== Interwar years ===
He was promoted to Senior Legal Advisor to the Foreign Office in 1929. In this capacity he travelled with Prime Minister Neville Chamberlain to Bad Godesberg in 1938 during the Munich Crisis.

=== Second World War ===
Malkin's experience in the First World War made him one of 'the few persons who knew by experience what had to be done quickly when the country was suddenly involved in war' at the outbreak of the Second World War.

==== United Nations ====
He was on the fourth commission at San Francisco working on the establishment of the International Court at the United Nations as well as other legal issues.

== Death ==
Sir William Malkin was lost at sea when his Liberator of RAF Transport Command disappeared following its departure from Montreal on 3 July 1945.

In tribute Lord Halifax wrote:

Intellectually sure-footed, and striking direct to the heart of any problem; in character fearless, disinterested, humble, concerned only with what he deemed to be the duty demanded of him: he brought indeed great qualities to the public service.
