= Malkovich =

Malkovich (Ukrainian: Малкович) is a family name of Slavic origin. Notable people with the surname include:

- John Malkovich (born 1953), American actor, producer, and director
- Ivan Malkovych (born 1960), Ukrainian publisher and poet

== See also ==
- Maljković
- Adam Malkovich, a character in the Metroid video game series
