= Malke =

Malke or Malki (Syriac: ܡܠܟܝ) is both a given name and a surname. Notable people with the name include:

== Given name ==
- Malke Bina, American rabbanit

== Surname ==
- Fadi Malke (born 1986), Swedish footballer
- Flavianus Michael Malke (Syriac: ܦܠܒܝܐܢܘܣ ܡܝܟܐܝܠ ܡܠܟܝ; 1858–1915), prelate
- Joseph Malke (Syriac: ܝܘܣܦ ܡܠܟܝ; 1948–2014), Syrian musician
