= Benjamin Heath Malkin =

British scholar

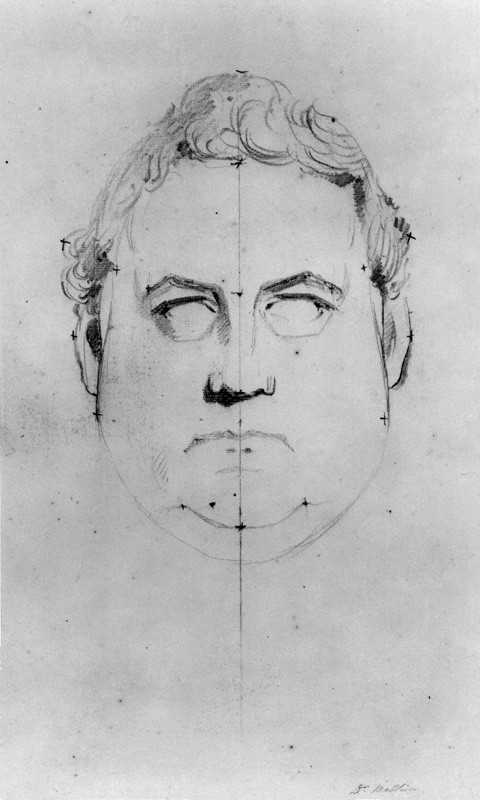
- Benjamin Heath Malkin by Sir Francis Leggatt Chantrey, pencil, circa 1818
- Born: 23 March 1769; London
- Died: 26 May 1842 (aged 73); Cowbridge

Academic background
- Education: Harrow School; Trinity College, Cambridge

Academic work
- Main interests: William Blake; History of South Wales; Gil Blas
- Notable works: Essays on Subjects connected with Civilization; A Father's Memoirs of his Child

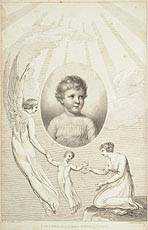
William Blake's frontispiece to A Father's Memoirs of his Child (1806), combining a portrait with a symbolic image of the child's soul departing the earth

Benjamin Heath Malkin (23 March 1769 – 26 May 1842 (aged 73)) was a British scholar and writer notable for his connection to the artist and poet William Blake.

== Career and education ==
Malkin was born in London, the son of Thomas Malkin of the parish of St Mary-le-Bow and his wife Mary Heath, daughter of Holland Heath. He was educated at Harrow School, and became a pensioner at Trinity College, Cambridge in 1788. He matriculated there in 1792, graduating B.A. the same year; he graduated M.A. in 1802. He was incorporated at St Mary Hall, Oxford in 1810, where he was awarded the degrees of B.C.L. and D.C.L. that year. In 1795 he published Essays on Subjects connected with Civilization (C. Dilly, London). From 1809 to 1828 he was headmaster of Bury St Edmunds Free School, where he taught a number of pupils who would later go on to become Cambridge Apostles.

In 1829, Malkin became the first professor of history in the newly formed London University. During his scholarly career he published both historical and creative works on many subjects, including a compendium of South Wales (1804), a translation of Gil Blas, and the play Almahide and Hamet. He contributed biographies to Rees's Cyclopædia.

== Connections with Blake ==
Today he is remembered for his 1806 book A Father's Memoirs of his Child, which leads off with a 48-page introduction consisting of a dedication to his friend Thomas Johnes and the earliest biographical account of Blake. Blake had designed (though it was engraved by Robert Cromek) the frontispiece depicting Malkin's deceased son. G. E. Bentley suggests that Malkin met Blake in 1803, soon after Blake returned to London from his three years in Felpham. It is also possible that the two men were acquainted via the publisher Joseph Johnson for whom Blake had worked. William Godwin reports meeting Malkin at dinner at Horne Tooke's in 1796 and 1797 and at Fuseli's Milton Gallery in 1800. It is therefore likely that Blake and Malkin shared radical sympathies. Malkin also lived close to Blake's patron Thomas Butts in Hackney, London and knew George Cumberland, another friend.

In addition to a short biography of Blake, Malkin published a number of Blake's lyric poems. This was the first time they had been published other than in Blake's own original illuminated etchings. Before the publication of Alexander Gilchrist's Life of William Blake in 1863, Malkin's book was the principal means of public knowledge of Blake's poetry. William Wordsworth copied poems from it.

== A Father's Memoirs of His Child ==
A Father's Memoirs of His Child is an account of the life and death of Malkin's son Thomas Williams Malkin, who along with his brother Benjamin is described as a child prodigy with an insatiable thirst for knowledge. He apparently learned the alphabet from blocks as an infant and would point to the correct letters when they were named. He did not speak until he was about two years old. Before he was three, he taught himself to write by copying print in books. Malkin insists that he did not push Thomas but followed his lead and taught him subjects such as Latin or mathematics only by request. Thomas also invented an imaginary country called Allestone, including details of its history, geography and monetary system, and an elaborate (for a five-year-old) map. Much of this material is included in the book, partly as proof that Thomas acted independently and was not coerced to achievements.

The book was written in part because of a confrontation with a "medical expert" the day after Thomas' death. It was his stated belief that Thomas had died of so-called "water on the brain", citing Thomas' "large head" and high intelligence as symptomatic of this disease. In effect, he accused Malkin of causing his son's death through having allowed him to overindulge in mental activity. Thus, Malkin includes the medical details of Thomas' final illness. He also ordered an autopsy, which he says proved conclusively that Thomas died of inflammatory bowel disease and peritonitis, and that his brain was perfectly normal. Malkin's grief and frustration are expressed vividly in this part of the text.

== Legacy ==
Malkin died at Cowbridge in the Vale of Glamorgan, South Wales, where he is commemorated at the Church of the Holy Cross, Cowbridge. His library was sold in 1828 by R. H. Evans (22 March & six following days) and his collection of engravings (also by Evans) on 31 March 1828. Copies of both sale catalogues are held at Cambridge University Library (Shelfmarks Munby.c.132(4-5)).

Malkin's other children survived to adulthood. Benjamin Jr., after following his father to Trinity College, Cambridge (where he was President of the Cambridge Union Society), became a barrister. He worked in the Imperial legal service, first as Recorder of Penang, and later as one of the Puisne Judges of Calcutta, for which he was knighted. He was noted for his high intelligence and pleasant manner. He married and had two children, including Herbert Malkin, lawyer and cricketer. He died in 1838.

Frederic, who was an infant when Thomas died, wrote several books on history including a history of Greece. Arthur, the youngest, also wrote historical textbooks. Craik criticizes Malkin for acceding to Thomas' requests to be educated at an early age and believes it did overtax his brain and contribute to his death; but she also admits that the other boys did well in life. Thomas' "Allestone" paracosm came to the attention of fantasy fans in 1973 when the map was reprinted in the 1979 revised edition of An Atlas of Fantasy by Jeremiah Post .
