= Robert Henryson =

15th-century Scottish makar (poet)

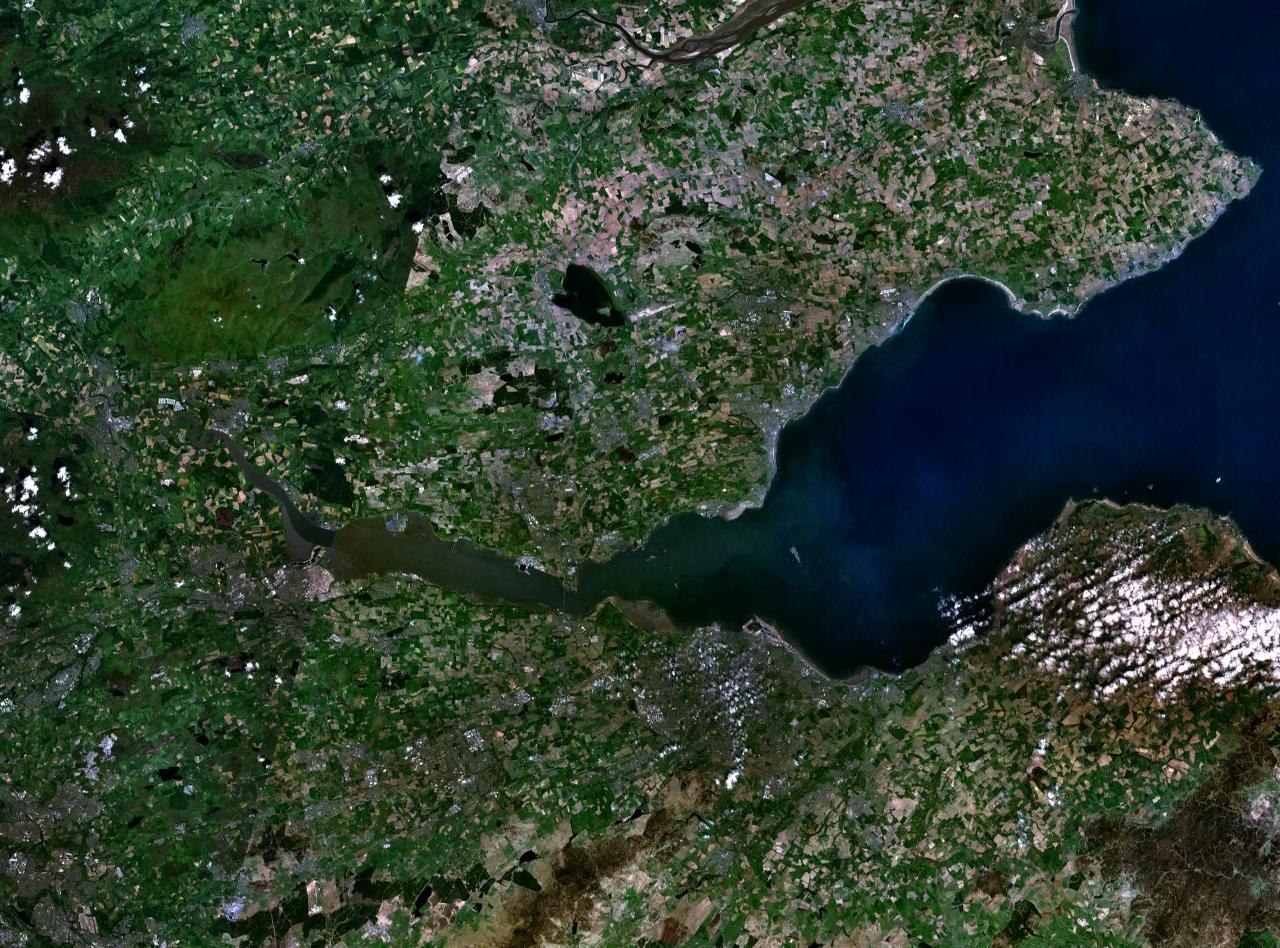
The Firth of Forth which separates Fife (north) and the Lothians (south). Dunfermline is close to the principal crossing point on the Fife side.

Robert Henryson (Middle Scots: Robert Henrysoun) was a poet who flourished in Scotland in the period c. 1460–1500. Counted among the Scots makars, he lived in the royal burgh of Dunfermline and is a distinctive voice in the Northern Renaissance at a time when the culture was on a cusp between medieval and renaissance sensibilities. Little is known of his life, but evidence suggests that he was a teacher who had training in law and the humanities, that he had a connection with Dunfermline Abbey and that he may also have been associated for a period with Glasgow University. His poetry was composed in Middle Scots at a time when this was the state language. His writing consists mainly of narrative works. His surviving body of work amounts to almost 5000 lines.

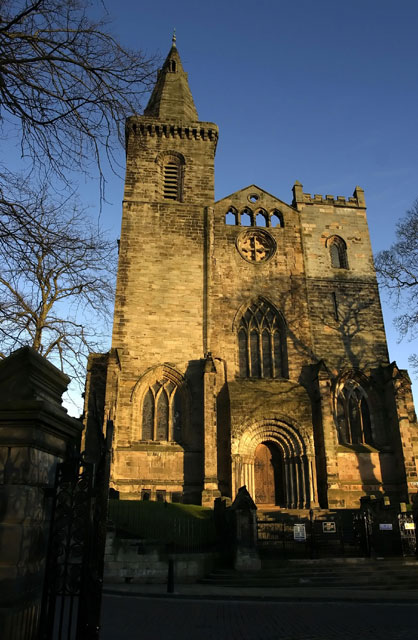
The west door of Dunfermline Abbey.

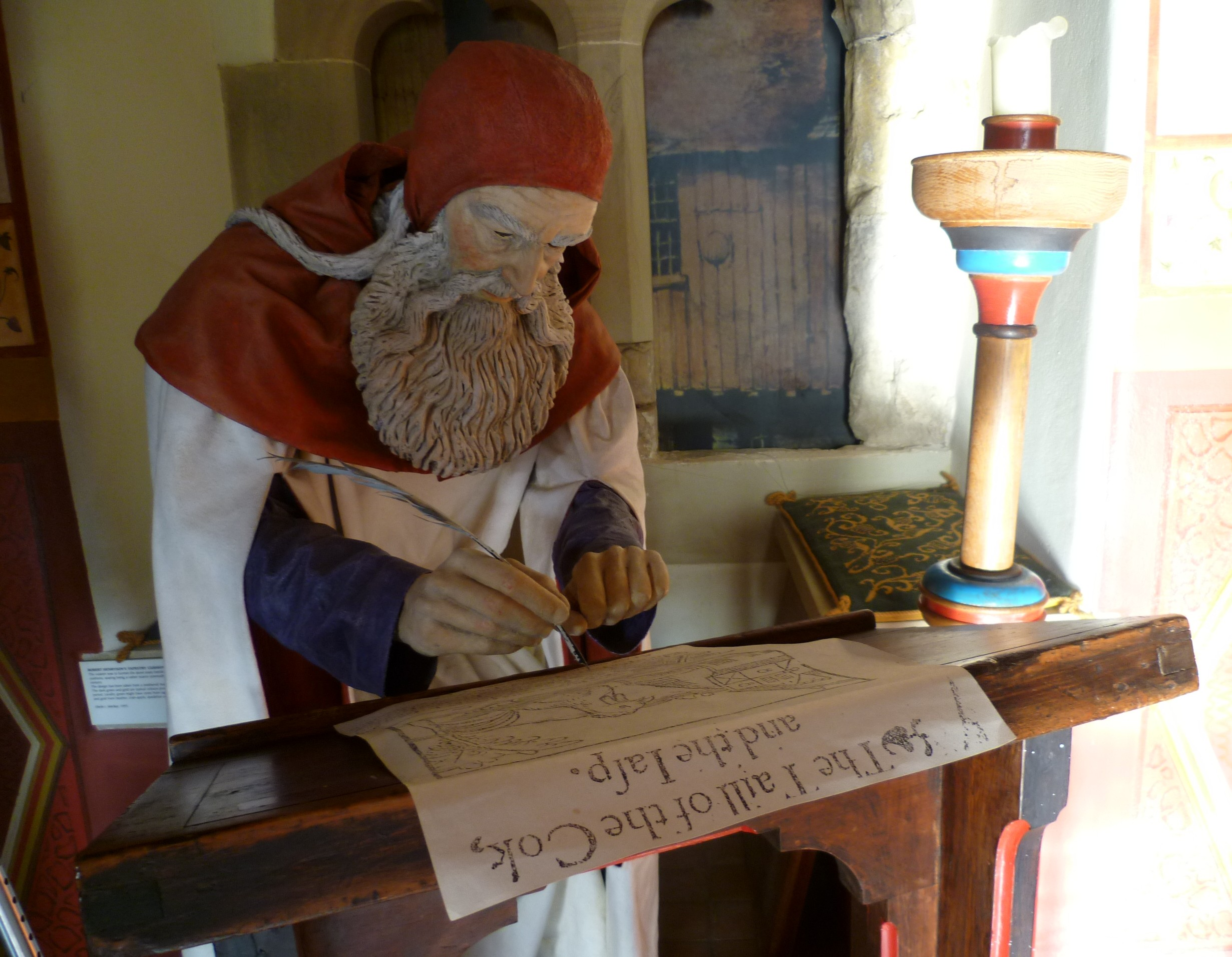
Figure in Abbot House which purports to imagine Henryson; more strictly speaking, the image depicts Aesop as portrayed in Henryson's Morall Fabillis

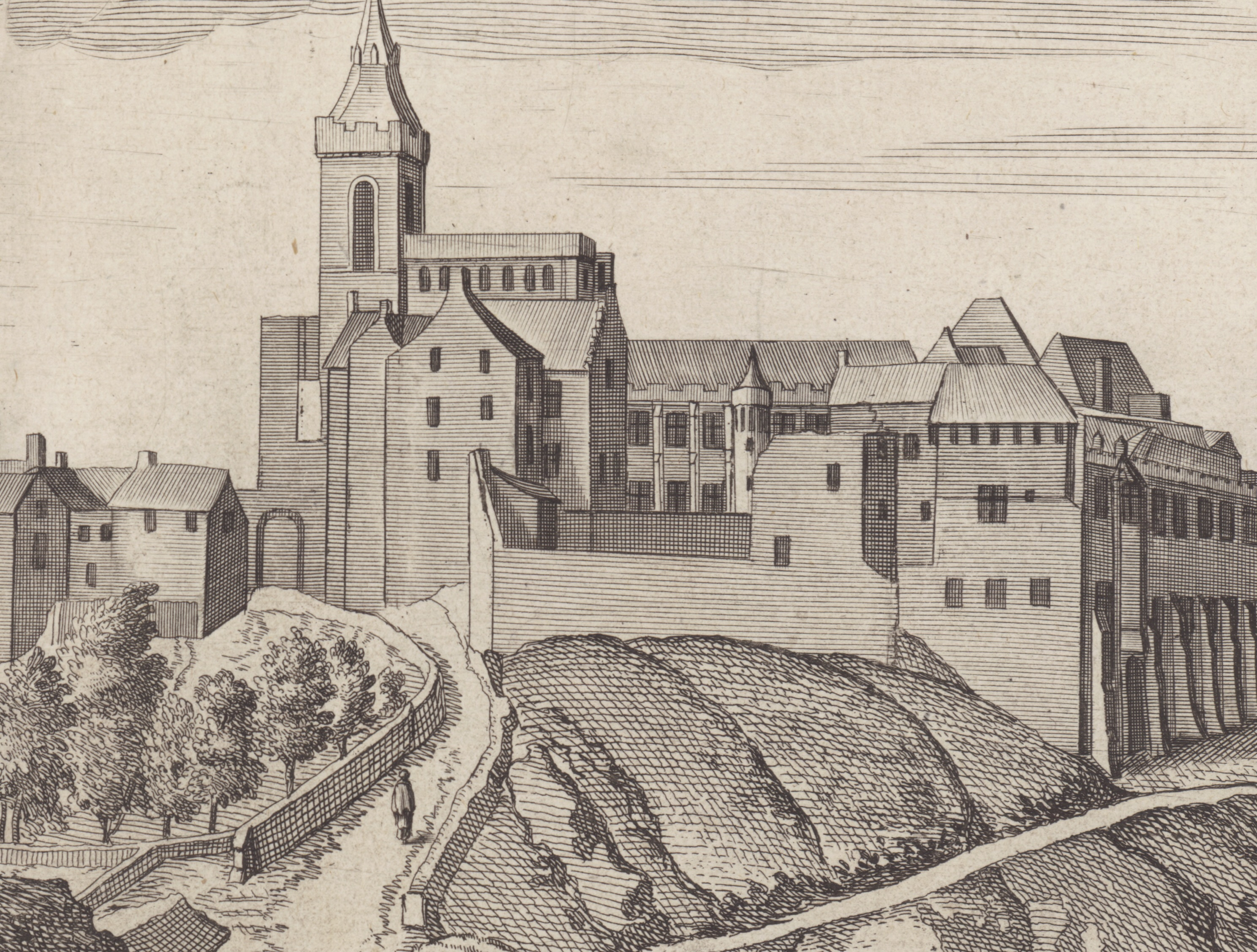
Dunfermline Abbey from a 17th-century engraving which gives a more complete impression of the original building complex than survives today.

== Works ==
Henryson's surviving canon consists of three long poems and around twelve miscellaneous short works in various genres. The longest poem is his Morall Fabillis, a tight, intricately structured set of thirteen fable stories in a cycle that runs just short of 3000 lines. Two other long works survive, both a little over 600 lines each. One is The Tale of Orpheus and Erudices his Quene, his dynamic and inventive version of the Orpheus story. The other is his Testament of Cresseid, a tale of moral and psychological subtlety in a tragic mode founded upon the literary conceit of "completing" Criseyde's story-arc from Chaucer's Troilus and Criseyde. Emily Wingfield has explored its significance in relation to the deployment of the Trojan Legend in political discourse between England and Scotland.

The range of Henryson's shorter works includes Robene and Makyne, a pastourelle on a theme of love, as well as a bawdy passage of comic flyting which targets the medical practises of his day, a highly crafted and compressed poem of Marian devotion, some allegorical works, some philosophical meditations, and a prayer against the pest. As with his longer works, his outward themes often carry important subtexts.

Constructing a sure chronology for Henryson's writings is not possible, but his Orpheus story may have been written earlier in his career, during his time in Glasgow, since one of its principal sources was contained in the university library. Internal evidence has been used to suggest that the Morall Fabillis were composed during the 1480s.

== Biographical inferences ==
There is no record of when or where Henryson was born or educated. The earliest found unconfirmed reference to him occurs on 10 September 1462, when a man of his name with license to teach is on record as having taken a post in the recently founded University of Glasgow. If this was the poet, as is usually assumed, then the citation indicates that he had completed studies in both arts and canon law.

Almost all early references to Henryson firmly associate his name with Dunfermline. He probably had some attachment to the city's Benedictine abbey, the burial place for many of the kingdom's monarchs and an important centre for pilgrimage close to a major ferry-crossing en route to St Andrews. Direct unconfirmed evidence for this connection occurs in 1478 when his name appears as a witness on abbey charters. If this was the poet, then it would establish that one of his functions was as notary for the abbey, an institution which possessed and managed a vast portfolio of territory across Scotland.

The almost universal references to Henryson as schoolmaster are usually taken to mean that he taught in and had some duty to run the grammar school for Dunfermline's abbatial burgh. A partial picture of what this meant in practice may be derived from a confirmatio of 1468 which granted provision to build a "suitable" house for the habitation of a "priest" (as master of grammar) and "scholars" in Dunfermline, including "poor scholars being taught free of charge".

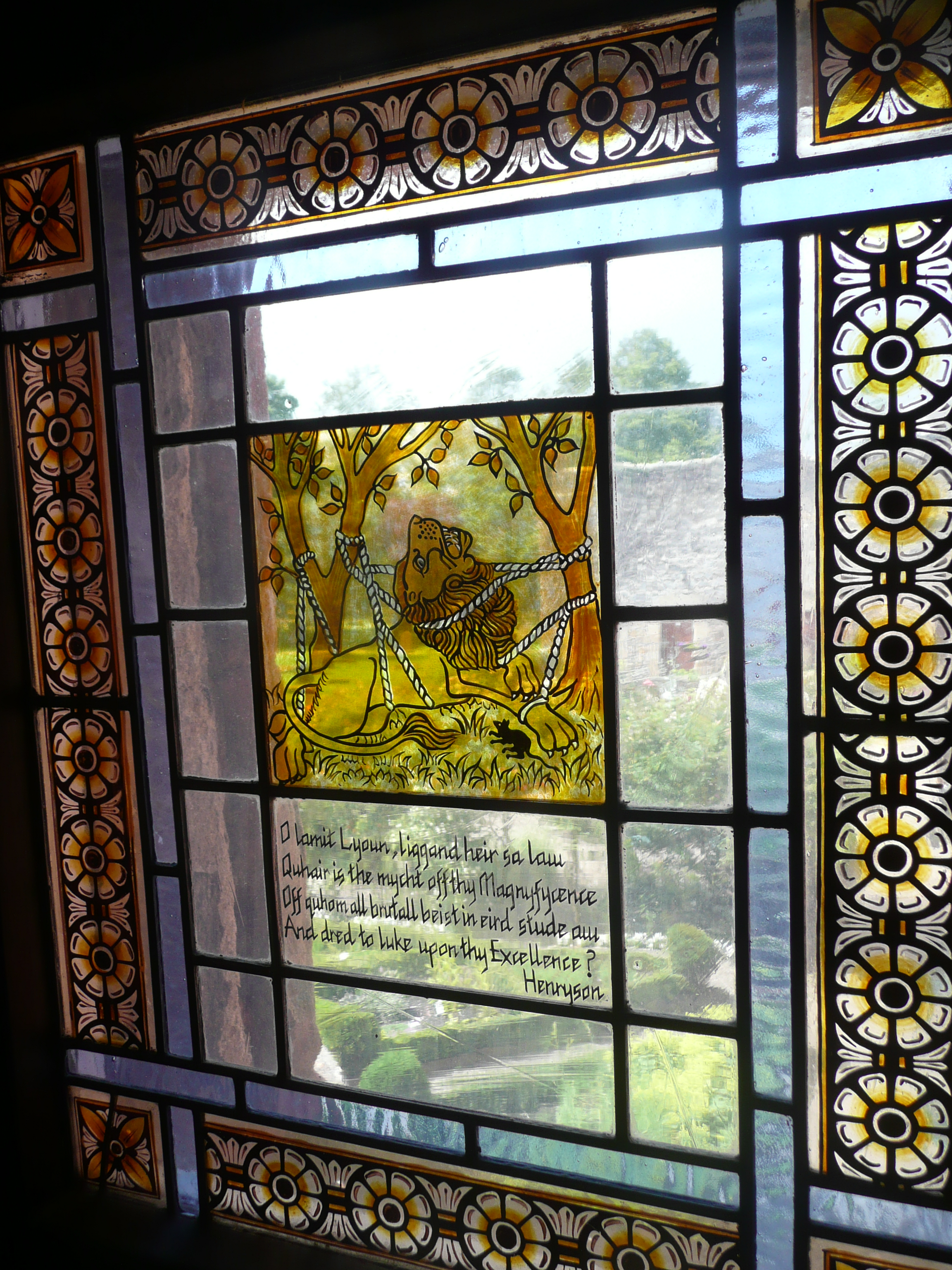
Abbot House Window, Dunfermline, depicting Henryson's Lion and the Mouse.

Dunfermline, as a royal burgh with capital status, was routinely visited by the court with residences directly linked to the abbey complex. There is no record of Henryson as a court poet, but the close proximity makes acquaintance with the royal household likely. He was active during the reigns of James III and James IV, both of whom had strong interests in literature.

According to the poet William Dunbar, Henryson died in Dunfermline. An apocryphal story by the English poet Francis Kynaston in the early 17th century refers to the flux as the cause of death, but this has not been established. The year of death also is unknown, although c.1498-9, a time of plague in the burgh, has been tentatively suggested. However, Dunbar gives the terminus ad quem in a couplet (usually considered to have been composed c.1505) which simply states that Death in Dunfermelyne

...hes done roune (has whispered in private)
with Maister Robert Henrysoun.

(William Dunbar, Lament for the Makaris, lines 81–2)

Almost nothing else is known of Henryson outside of his surviving writing. It is not known if he originated from Dunfermline and a suggestion that he may have been linked to the Fife branch of the Clan Henderson is not possible to verify, although his name is certainly of that ilk.

== General style ==
Henryson generally wrote in a first-person voice using a familiar tone that quickly brings the reader into his confidence and gives a notable impression of authentic personality and beliefs. The writing stays rooted in daily life and continues to feel grounded even when the themes are metaphysical or elements are fantastic. His language is a supple, flowing and concise Scots that clearly shows he knew Latin, while scenes are usually given a deftly evocative Scottish setting which can only have come from close connection and observation. This detailed, intimate and realistic approach, at times, strongly suggests matters of personal experience and attitudes to actual contemporary events, yet the specifics remain elusive in ways that tantalise readers and critics. Some of this sense of intrigue may be in part accidental, but it is also heightened by his cannily controlled application of a philosophy of fiction, a frequently self-proclaimed feature of the work.

No concrete details of his life can be directly inferred from his works, but there are some passages of self-reflection that appear to contain autobiographical implications, particularly in the opening stanzas of his Testament of Cresseid.

== Henryson's Scots ==
Henryson wrote using the Scots language of the 15th century. This was in an age when the use of vernacular languages for literature in many parts of Europe was increasingly taking the place of Latin, the long-established lingua franca across the continent.

== Legacy ==
Poet Seamus Heaney adapted Henryson's fables and they were published by Faber and Faber in 2010. The poems were made into a series of short, animated films, shortly before he died. Heaney worked with Scottish actor Billy Connolly in the production of the works, with a score composed for the project by pianist Barry Douglas. The films were broadcast on the BBC in 2014, shortly after Heaney's death - one of the last creations of Heaney's life.

== Extant poems ==
All known and extant writings attributed to Robert Henryson are listed here. In addition, the scholar Matthew P McDiarmid identified from an index a lost poem by Henryson which began: On fut by Forth as I couth found (not listed below).

=== Long works ===
- The Morall Fabillis of Esope the Phrygian (See below for list of individual fables in the cycle)
- The Tale of Orpheus and Erudices his Quene
- The Testament of Cresseid

=== Short works ===
- Robene and Makyne
- Sum Practysis of Medecyne
- The Annuciation
- Ane Prayer for the Pest
- The Garment of Gud Ladeis
- The Bludy Serk
- The Thre Deid-Pollis
- Against Hasty Credence
- The Abbay Walk
- The Praise of Age
- The Ressoning Betwix Aige and Yowth
- The Ressoning Betwix Deth and Man

=== Individual fables ===
Seven of the stories in Henryson's cycle are Aesopian fables derived from elegiac Romulus texts, while the other six (given in italics) are Reynardian in genre. The three titles given with bold numbers provide evidence for the integral unity of the overall structure.

- 01 The Cock and the Jasp
- 02 The Twa Mice
- 03 The Cock and the Fox
- 04 The Confession of the Tod
- 05 The Trial of the Tod
- 06 The Sheep and the Dog
- 07 The Lion and the Mouse
- 08 The Preaching of the Swallow
- 09 The Fox the Wolf and the Cadger
- 10 The Fox the Wolf and the Husbandman
- 11 The Wolf and the Wether
- 12 The Wolf and the Lamb
- 13 The Paddock and the Mouse

== Bibliography ==
- Gray, Douglas (1979), Robert Henryson, E.J. Brill, ISBN 9789004059177
- Barron, W.R.J. (ed.) (1981), Robert Henryson: Selected Poems, Carcanet New Press ISBN 9780856353017
- McDiarmid, Matthew P. (1981), Robert Henryson, Scottish Academic Press, ISBN 0-7073-0306-0
- Fox, Denton (ed.) (1981), The Poems of Robert Henryson, Clarendon Press, ISBN 9780198127031
- David Murison (ed.) (1989), Selected Poems by Robert Henryson, The Saltire Society, ISBN 9780854110100
- Fleming, Morna (ed.) (2003), The Flouer o Makarheid, The Robert Henryson Society, Dunfermline
- Wingfield, Emily (2014), The Trojan Legend in Medieval Scottish Literature, D.S. Brewer, ISBN 978-1-84384-364-1

== See also ==
- Scotland's Education Act of 1496
- Scotland in the Late Middle Ages
- Scotsoun
