= Arthur Malkin =

English cricketer, writer, and alpinist

Personal information
- Full name: Arthur Thomas Malkin
- Born: 1803; Hackney, London
- Died: 1888 (aged 84–85); Inverness

Domestic team information
- Years: Team
- 1826: Cambridge University
- Source: CricketArchive, 18 June 2013

Arthur Thomas Malkin (1803–1888) was an English writer, alpinist and cricketer.

== Life ==
The third son of Benjamin Heath Malkin and his wife Charlotte Williams, daughter of the Rev. Thomas Williams, headmaster of Cowbridge grammar school, he entered Trinity College, Cambridge in 1820, graduating B.A. in 1825, M.A, in 1828. He is likely the "Malkin" elected to the Cambridge Apostles in 1826.

A civil engineering partnership with Angier March Perkins and James Philip Roy was dissolved in 1829. He purchased an estate at Corrybrough, Tomatin, Inverness-shire, where he became a Deputy Lieutenant; and also resided at 21 Wimpole Street, London.

== Sportsman ==
Malkin was associated with Cambridge University Cricket Club and was recorded in one match in 1826, totalling 11 runs with a highest score of 11 not out and holding no catches.

In 1827 he was one of a rowing eight that took a boat from Cambridge to King's Lynn, then across The Wash to Boston, Lincolnshire. Others in the crew were Kenelm Digby and John Mitchell Kemble.

== Works ==
- Biographies of eminent men in literature, arts, and arms, from the 13th century, Nattali & Bond, London, 1850
  - 1. - Dante to Raleigh
  - 2. - Lord Bacon to Leibniz
  - 3. - Somers to John Hunter
  - 4. - Gibbon to Wilberforce
- Distinguished men of modern times, Knight, London 1838 (Bd. 1–4)
- Gallery portraits with memoirs. Knight, London 1848
- Historical Parallels, Knight, London (3 vols.)
- History of Greece from the earliest times to its final subjection to Rome, Baldwin & Cradock, London 1829
- Leaves from the Alpine notebooks, London 1890

== Family ==
Malkin married:

1. Mary Anne Carr, daughter of John Addison Carr, Rector of Hadstock, Essex, in 1833;
2. Thomasine Gill, eldest daughter of Thomas Gill, M.P.

== Bibliography ==
- Haygarth, Arthur (1996) [1862]. Scores & Biographies, Volume 1 (1744–1826). Kennington: Frederick Lillywhite. ISBN 978-19-00592-23-9.
- Haygarth, Arthur (1997) [1862]. Scores & Biographies, Volume 2 (1827–1840). Kennington: Frederick Lillywhite. ISBN 978-19-00592-23-9.
