= Málkov =

Málkov may refer to places in the Czech Republic:

- Málkov (Beroun District), a municipality and village in the Central Bohemian Region
- Málkov (Chomutov District), a municipality and village in the Ústí nad Labem Region
- Málkov, a village and part of Přimda in the Plzeň Region
