= George Crabbe =

English poet, surgeon, and clergyman (1754–1832)

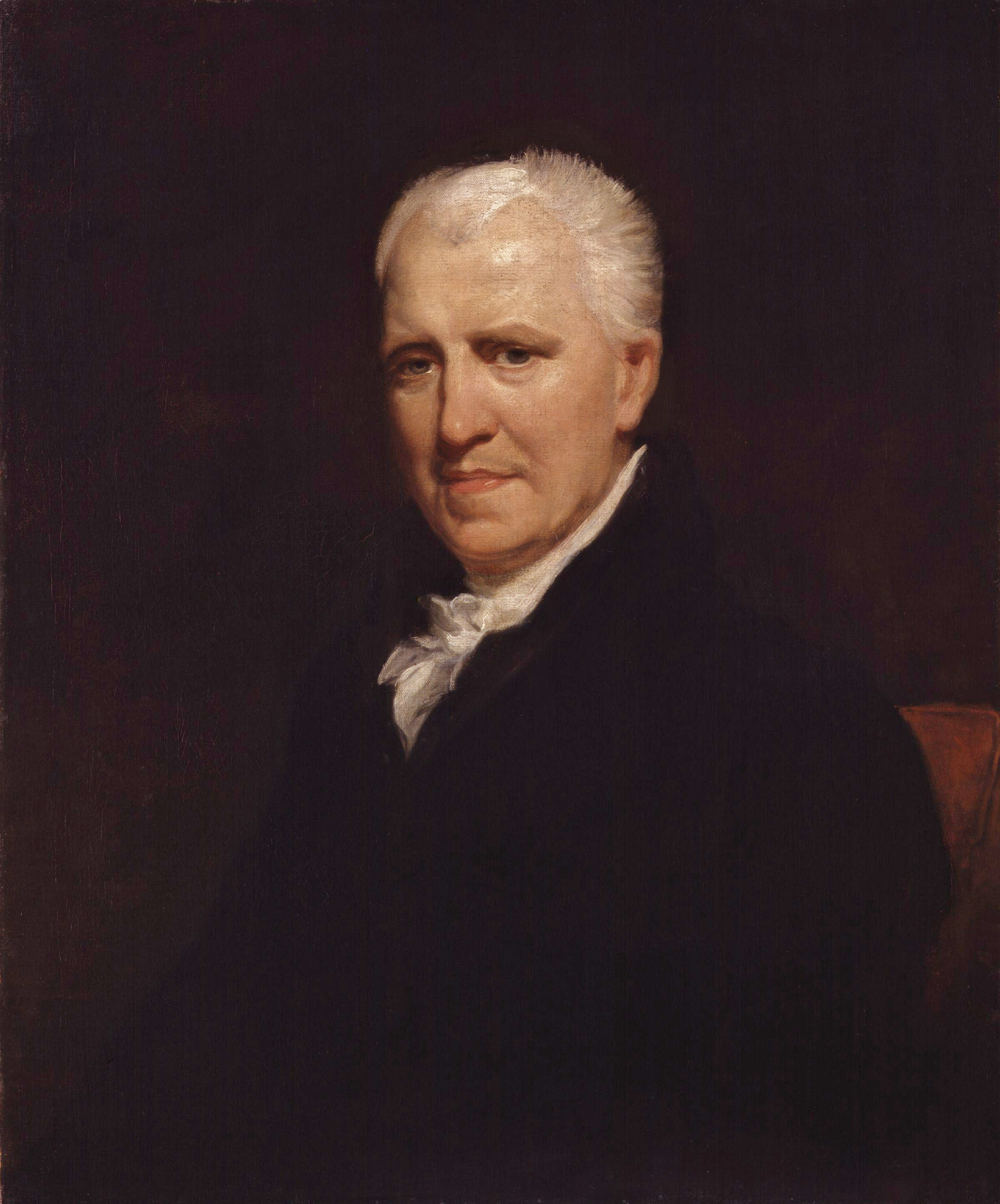
- Portrait of Crabbe by Henry William Pickersgill, circa 1818–19
- Born: 24 December 1754; Aldeburgh, Suffolk, England
- Died: 3 February 1832 (aged 77); Trowbridge, Wiltshire, England
- Writing career
- Period: 1770s to 1830s
- Genre: Poetry
- Subject: Rural life
- Notable works: The Village (1783); The Borough (1810)

Signature
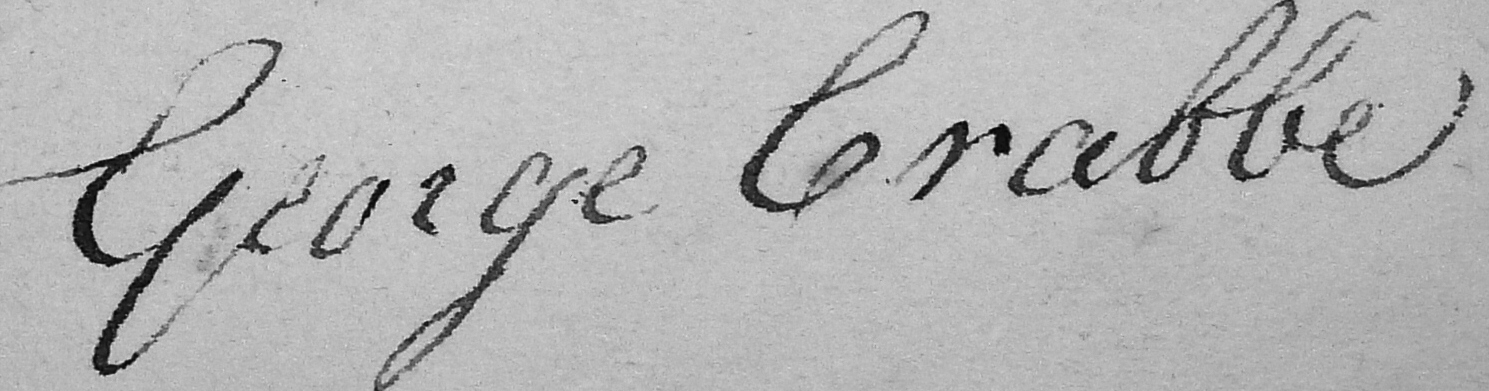

George Crabbe (/kræb/ KRAB; 24 December 1754 – 3 February 1832) was an English poet and clergyman. He is best known for his early use of the realistic narrative form and his descriptions of middle and working-class life and people.

Aged 14, Crabbe was apprenticed to a farmer–apothecary at Wickhambrook, which he resented, spending more time as a farm-hand than training as an apothecary. He returned to work in his father's warehouse, and was then sent to John Page, a surgeon in Woodbridge, who employed him in filling prescriptions and compounding medicines.

At the end of four years with Page, Crabbe returned to Aldeburgh. After serving as his assistant, he took over the apothecary of James Maskill. Crabbe read, studied, and learnt anatomy by dissecting dogs. A year later, he put his apothecary shop in the hands of a neighbouring surgeon and went to London to acquire medical knowledge, where he heard the lectures of the Scottish midwives Orme and Lowder, who followed Dr William Smellie's obstetrical tradition.

In 1780, Crabbe abandoned his unsuccessful labours as an apothecary. He travelled to London to make a living as a poet. After encountering serious financial difficulty and being unable to have his work published, he wrote to the statesman and author Edmund Burke for assistance. Burke was impressed enough by Crabbe's poems to promise to help him in any way he could. The two became close friends and Burke helped Crabbe greatly, both in his literary career and in building a role within the church.

Burke introduced Crabbe to the literary and artistic society of London, including Sir Joshua Reynolds and Samuel Johnson, who read The Village before its publication and made some minor changes. Burke secured Crabbe the important position of Chaplain to the Duke of Rutland. Crabbe served as a clergyman in various capacities for the rest of his life, with Burke's continued help in securing these positions. He developed friendships with many of the great literary men of his day, including Sir Walter Scott, whom he visited in Edinburgh, and William Wordsworth and some of his fellow Lake Poets, who frequently visited Crabbe as his guests.

Lord Byron described him as "nature's sternest painter, yet the best." Crabbe's poetry was predominantly in the form of heroic couplets, and has been described as unsentimental in its depiction of provincial life and society. The modern critic Frank Whitehead wrote that "Crabbe, in his verse tales in particular, is an important—indeed, a major—poet whose work has been and still is seriously undervalued." Crabbe's works include The Village (1783), Poems (1807), The Borough (1810), and his poetry collections Tales (1812) and Tales of the Hall (1819).

== Biography ==
=== Early life ===
Crabbe was born in Aldeburgh, Suffolk, the eldest child of George Crabbe Sr. The elder George Crabbe had been a schoolmaster at a village school in Orford, Suffolk, and later in Norton, near Loddon, Norfolk. Later, he had become a tax collector for salt duties, a position his own father had held. As a young man, he had married an older widow named Craddock, who became the mother of his six children: George Jr; Robert; John; William; Mary; and a sister who died in infancy.

George Jr. spent his first 25 years close to his birthplace. He showed an aptitude for books and learning at an early age. He was sent to school while still very young, and developed an interest in the stories and ballads that were popular among his neighbours. His father owned a few books, and used to read passages from John Milton and from various 18th-century poets to his family. He also subscribed to Benjamin Martin's Philosophical Magazine, giving the "poet's corner" section to George. The senior Crabbe had interests in the local fishing industry, and owned a fishing boat; he had contemplated raising his son George to be a seaman, but soon found that the boy was unsuited to such a career.

George's father respected his son's interest in literature, and George was sent first to a boarding-school at Bungay near his home, and a few years later to a more important school at Stowmarket, where he gained an understanding of mathematics and Latin, and a familiarity with the Latin classics. His early reading included the works of William Shakespeare, Alexander Pope, who had a great influence on George's future works, Abraham Cowley, Sir Walter Raleigh and Edmund Spenser. He spent three years at Stowmarket before leaving school to find a medical apprenticeship.

In 1768 Crabbe was apprenticed to an apothecary at Wickhambrook, near Bury St Edmunds; the apothecary also kept a small farm, and he ended up doing farm labour and errands, rather than medical work. In 1771 he changed masters and moved to Woodbridge. There he was under the surgeon John Page. He remained until 1775.

While at Woodbridge, Crabbe joined a small club of young men who met at an inn for evening discussions. Through his contacts there he met his future wife, Sarah Elmy. Crabbe called her "Mira", later referring to her by this name in some of his poems. During this time he began writing poetry. In 1772, a ladies' magazine offered a prize for the best poem on the subject of hope, which Crabbe won. The same magazine printed other short pieces of Crabbe's throughout 1772. They were signed "G. C., Woodbridge," and included some of his lyrics addressed to Mira. Other known verses written while he was at Woodbridge show that he made experiments in stanza form modelled on the works of earlier English poets, but only showed some slight imitative skill.

=== 1775 to 1785 ===
His first major work, a satirical poem of nearly 400 lines in Pope's couplet form entitled Inebriety, was self-published in 1775. Crabbe later said of the poem, which received little or no attention at the time, "Pray let not this be seen ... there is very little of it that I'm not heartily ashamed of." By this time he had completed his medical training and had returned home to Aldeburgh. He had intended to go on to London to study at a hospital, but he was forced through low finances to work for some time as a local warehouseman. He eventually travelled to London in 1777 to practise medicine, returning home in financial difficulty after a year. He continued to practise as a surgeon after returning to Aldeburgh, but as his surgical skills remained deficient, he attracted only the poorest patients, and his fees were small and undependable. This hurt his chances of an early marriage, but Sarah stayed devoted to him.

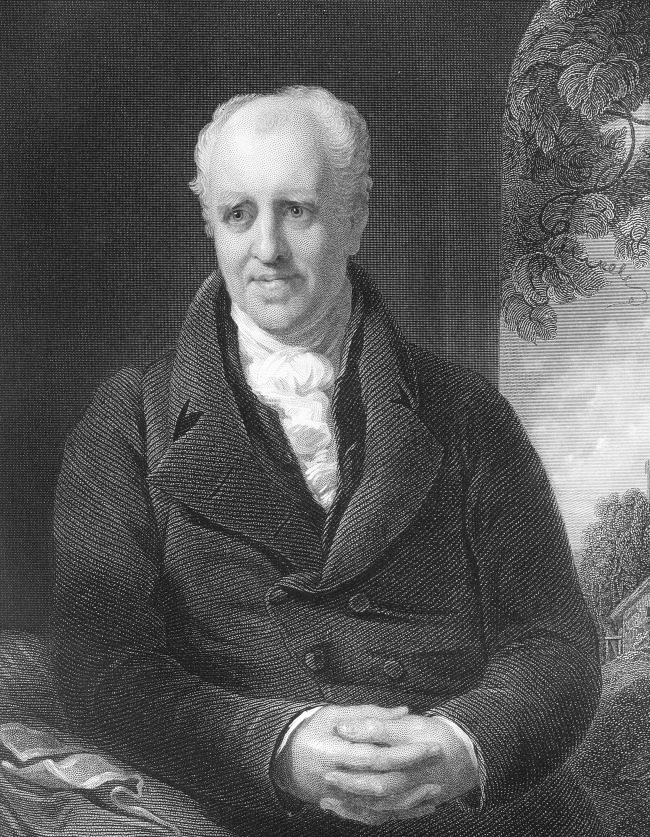
George Crabbe.

In late 1779 he decided to move to London and see if he could make it as a poet, or, if that failed, as a doctor. He moved to London in April 1780, where he had little success, and by the end of May he had been forced to pawn some of his possessions, including his surgical instruments. He composed a number of works but was refused publication. He wrote several letters seeking patronage, but these were also refused. In June Crabbe witnessed instances of mob violence during the Gordon Riots, and recorded them in his journal. He was able to publish a poem at this time entitled The Candidate, but it was badly received by critics.

He continued to rack up debts that he had no way of paying, and his creditors pressed him. He later told Walter Scott and John Gibson Lockhart that "during many months when he was toiling in early life in London he hardly ever tasted butchermeat except on a Sunday, when he dined usually with a tradesman's family, and thought their leg of mutton, baked in the pan, the perfection of luxury." In early 1781 he wrote a letter to Edmund Burke asking for help, in which he included samples of his poetry. Burke was swayed by Crabbe's letter and a subsequent meeting with him, giving him money to relieve his immediate wants, and assuring him that he would do all in his power to further Crabbe's literary career. Among the samples that Crabbe had sent to Burke were pieces of his poems The Library and The Village.

A short time after their first meeting Burke told his friend Sir Joshua Reynolds that Crabbe had "the mind and feelings of a gentleman." Burke gave Crabbe the footing of a friend, admitting him to his family circle at Beaconsfield. There he was given an apartment, supplied with books, and made a member of the family. The time he spent with Burke and his family helped by enlarging his knowledge and ideas, and introducing him to many new and valuable friends including Charles James Fox and Samuel Johnson. He completed his unfinished poems and revised others with the help of Burke's criticism. Burke helped him have his poem, The Library, published anonymously in June 1781, by a publisher that had previously refused some of his work. The Library was greeted with modest praise from critics, and slight public appreciation.

Through their friendship, Burke discovered that Crabbe was more suited to be a clergyman than a surgeon. Crabbe had a good knowledge of Latin and an evident natural piety, and was well read in the scriptures. He was ordained to the curacy of his native town on 21 December 1781 through Burke's recommendation. He returned to live in Aldeburgh with his sister and father, his mother having died in his absence. Crabbe was surprised to find that he was poorly treated by his fellow townsmen, who resented his rise in social class. With Burke's help, Crabbe was able to leave Aldeburgh the next year, to become chaplain to the Duke of Rutland at Belvoir Castle in Leicestershire. This was an unusual move on Burke's part, as this kind of preferment would usually have been given to a family member or personal friend of the Duke or through political interest.

Crabbe's experience as chaplain at Belvoir was not altogether happy. He was treated with kindness by the Duke and Duchess, but his slightly unpolished manners and his position as a literary dependent made his relations with others in the Duke's house difficult, especially the servants. However, the Duke and Duchess and many of their noble guests shared an interest in Crabbe's literary talent and work. During his time there, his poem The Village was published in May 1783, achieving popularity with the public and critics. Samuel Johnson said of the poem in a letter to Reynolds "I have sent you back Mr. Crabbe's poem, which I read with great delight. It is original, vigorous, and elegant." Johnson's friend and biographer James Boswell also praised The Village. It was said at the time of publication that Johnson had made extensive changes to the poem, but Boswell responded by saying that "the aid given by Johnson to the poem, as to The Traveller and Deserted Village of Goldsmith, were so small as by no means to impair the distinguished merit of the author."

Crabbe was able to keep up his friendships with Burke, Reynolds, and others during the Duke's occasional visits to London. He visited the theatre, and was impressed with the actresses Sarah Siddons and Dorothea Jordan. Around this time it was decided that, as Chaplain to a noble family, Crabbe was in need of a college degree, and his name was entered on the boards of Trinity College, Cambridge, through the influence of Bishop Watson of Llandaff, so that Crabbe could obtain a degree without residence. This was in 1783, but almost immediately afterwards he received an LL.B. degree from the Archbishop of Canterbury. This degree allowed Crabbe to be given two small livings in Dorsetshire, at Frome St Quintin and Evershot. This promotion does not seem to have interfered with Crabbe's residence at Belvoir or in London; it is likely that curates were placed in these situations.

On the strength of these preferments and a promise of future assistance from the Duke, Crabbe and Sarah Elmy were married in December 1783, in the parish church of Beccles, where Miss Elmy's mother lived, and a few weeks later went to live together at Belvoir Castle. In 1784 the Duke of Rutland became Lord Lieutenant of Ireland. It was decided that Crabbe was not to be on the Duke's staff in Ireland, though the two men parted as close friends. The young couple stayed on at Belvoir for nearly another eighteen months before Crabbe accepted a vacant curacy in the neighbourhood, that of Stathern in Leicestershire, where Crabbe and his wife moved in 1785. A child had been born to them at Belvoir, dying only hours after birth. During the following four years at Stathern they had three other children; two sons, George and John, in 1785 and 1787, and a daughter in 1789, who died in infancy. Crabbe later told his children that his four years at Stathern were the happiest of his life.

=== 1785 to 1810 ===
In October 1787 the Duke of Rutland died at the Vice-Regal Lodge in Dublin, after a short illness, at the early age of 35. Crabbe assisted at the funeral at Belvoir. The Duchess, anxious to have their former chaplain close by, was able to get Crabbe the two livings of Muston, Leicestershire, and Allington, Lincolnshire, in exchange for his old livings. Crabbe brought his family to Muston in February 1789. His connection with the two livings lasted for over 25 years, but during 13 of these years he was a non-resident. He stayed three years at Muston. Another son, Edmund, was born in 1790. In 1792, through the death of one of Sarah's relations and soon after of her older sister, the Crabbe family came into possession of an estate in Parham in Suffolk, which removed all of their financial worries. Crabbe soon moved his family to this estate. Their son William was born the same year.

Crabbe's life at Parham was not happy. The former owner of the estate had been very popular for his hospitality, while Crabbe's lifestyle was much more quiet and private. His solace here was the company of his friend Dudley Long North and his fellow Whigs who lived nearby. Crabbe soon sent his two sons George and John to school in Aldeburgh. After four years at Parham, the Crabbes moved to a home in Great Glemham, Suffolk, placed at his disposal by Dudley North. The family remained here for four or five years. In 1796 their third son, Edmund died at the age of six. This was a heavy blow to Sarah who began suffering from a nervous disorder from which she never recovered. Crabbe, a devoted husband, tended her with exemplary care until her death in 1813. Robert Southey, writing about Crabbe to his friend, Neville White, in 1808, said "It was not long before his wife became deranged, and when all this was told me by one who knew him well, five years ago, he was still almost confined in his own house, anxiously waiting upon this wife in her long and hopeless malady. A sad history! It is no wonder that he gives so melancholy a picture of human life."

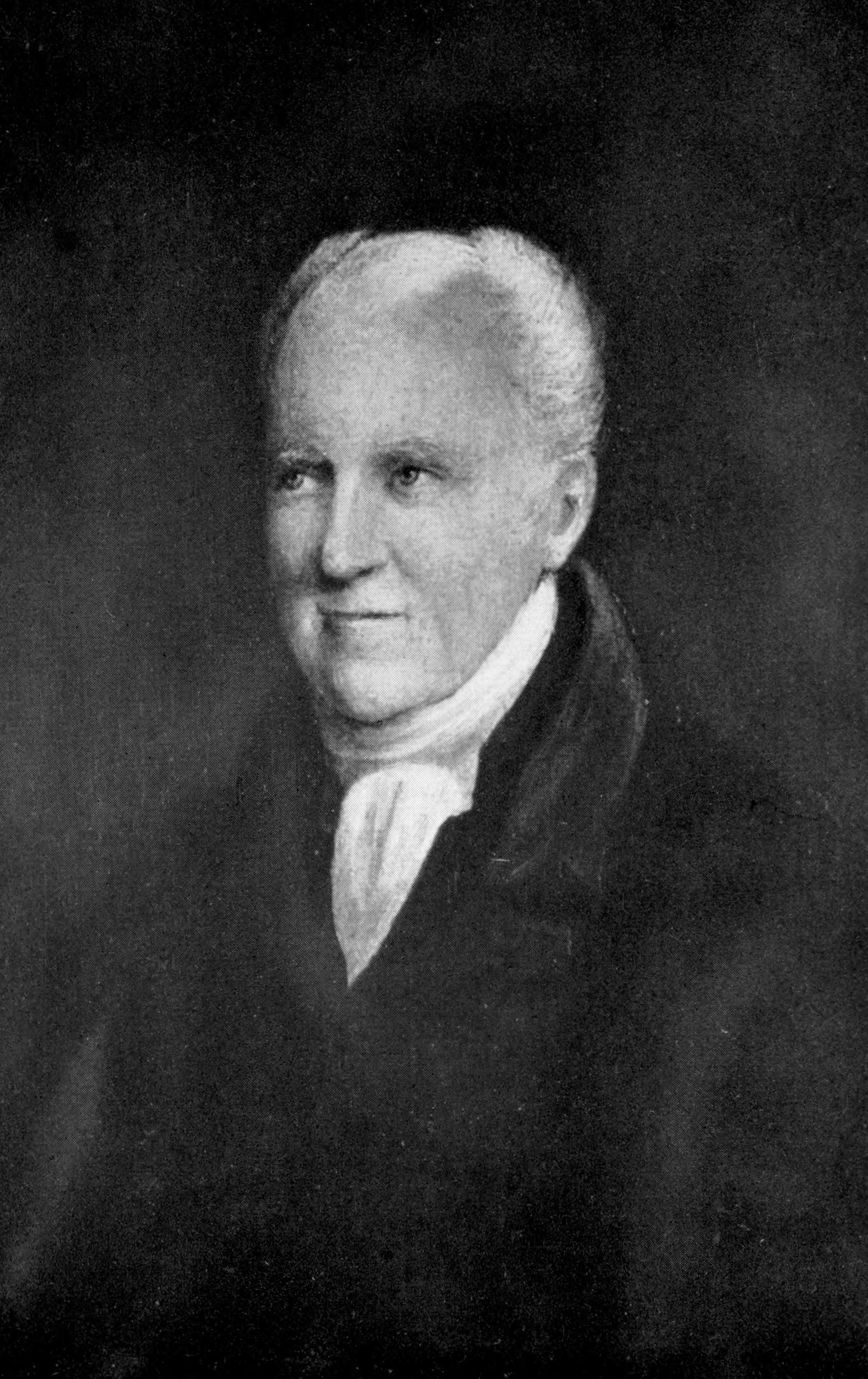
George Crabbe, c. 1820s

During his time at Glemham, Crabbe composed several novels, none of which was published. After Glemham, Crabbe moved to the village of Rendham in Suffolk, where he stayed until 1805. His poem The Parish Register was all but completed while at Rendham, and The Borough was also begun. 1805 was the last year of Crabbe's stay in Suffolk, and it was made memorable in literature by the appearance of the Lay of the Last Minstrel by Walter Scott. Crabbe first saw it in a bookseller's shop in Ipswich, read it nearly through while standing at the counter, and pronounced that a new and great poet had appeared. In October 1805, Crabbe returned with his wife and two sons to the parsonage at Muston. He had been absent for nearly 13 years, of which four had been spent at Parham, five at Great Glemham, and four at Rendham.

In September 1807, Crabbe published a new volume of poems. Included in this volume were The Library, The Newspaper, and The Village; the principal new poem was The Parish Register, to which were added Sir Eustace Grey and The Hall of Justice. The volume was dedicated to Henry Vassall-Fox, 3rd Baron Holland, nephew and sometime ward of Charles James Fox. An interval of 22 years had passed since Crabbe's last appearance as an author, and he explained in the preface to this volume the reasons for this lapse as being his higher calling as a clergyman and his slow progress in poetical ability. This volume led to Crabbe's general acceptance as an important poet. Four editions were issued during the following year and a half, the fourth appearing in March 1809. The reviews were unanimous in approval, headed by Francis Jeffrey in the Edinburgh Review.

In 1809 Crabbe sent a copy of his poems in their fourth edition to Walter Scott, who acknowledged them in a friendly reply. Scott told Crabbe "how for more than twenty years he had desired the pleasure of a personal introduction to him, and how, as a lad of eighteen, he had met with selections from The Village and The Library in The Annual Register." This exchange of letters led to a friendship that lasted for the rest of their lives, both authors dying in 1832. Crabbe's favourite among Scott's "Waverley" novels was The Heart of Midlothian.

The success of The Parish Register in 1807 encouraged Crabbe to proceed with a far longer poem, which he had been working on for several years. The Borough was begun at Rendham in Suffolk in 1801, continued at Muston after his return in 1805, and finally completed during a long visit to Aldeburgh in the autumn of 1809. It was published in 1810. In spite of its defects, The Borough was an outright success. The poem appeared in February 1810, and went through six editions in the next six years.

When he visited London a few years later and was received with general welcome in the literary world, he was very surprised. "In my own village", he told James Smith, "they think nothing of me." The three years following the publication of The Borough were especially lonely for him. He did have his two sons, George and John, with him; they had both passed through Cambridge, one at Trinity and the other at Caius, and were now clergymen themselves, each holding a curacy in the neighbourhood, enabling them to live under the parental roof, but Mrs. Crabbe's health was now very poor, and Crabbe had no daughter or female relative at home to help him with her care.

=== Later life ===
Crabbe's next volume of poetry, Tales, was published in the summer of 1812. It received a warm welcome from the poet's admirers, was favourably reviewed by Jeffrey in the Edinburgh Review and is considered to be his masterpiece. In the summer of 1813, Mrs. Crabbe felt well enough to want to see London again, and the father and mother and two sons spent nearly three months in rooms in a hotel. Crabbe was able to visit Dudley North and some of his other old friends, and to visit and help the poor and distressed, remembering his own want and misery in the great city thirty years earlier. The family returned to Muston in September, and Mrs. Crabbe died at the end of October at the age of 63. Within days of his wife's death Crabbe fell seriously ill, and was in danger of dying. He rallied, however, and returned to the duties of his parish. In 1814, he became rector of St James', the parish church of the town of Trowbridge in Wiltshire, a position given to him by the new Duke of Rutland. He remained at Trowbridge for the rest of his life.

His two sons followed him, as soon as their existing engagements allowed them to leave Leicestershire. The younger, John, who married in 1816, became his father's curate, and the elder, who married a year later, became curate at Pucklechurch, not far away. Crabbe's reputation as a poet continued to grow in these years. His reputation soon made him a welcome guest in many houses to which his position as rector might not have admitted him. Nearby at Bremhill was the poet William Lisle Bowles, who introduced Crabbe to the noble family at Bowood House, home of the Marquess of Lansdowne, who was always ready to welcome those distinguished in literature and the arts. It was at Bowood that Crabbe first met the poet Samuel Rogers, who became a close friend and had an influence on Crabbe's poetry. In 1817, on the recommendation of Rogers, Crabbe stayed in London from the middle of June to the end of July in order to enjoy the literary society of the capital. While there he met Thomas Campbell, and through him and Rogers was introduced to his future publisher John Murray.

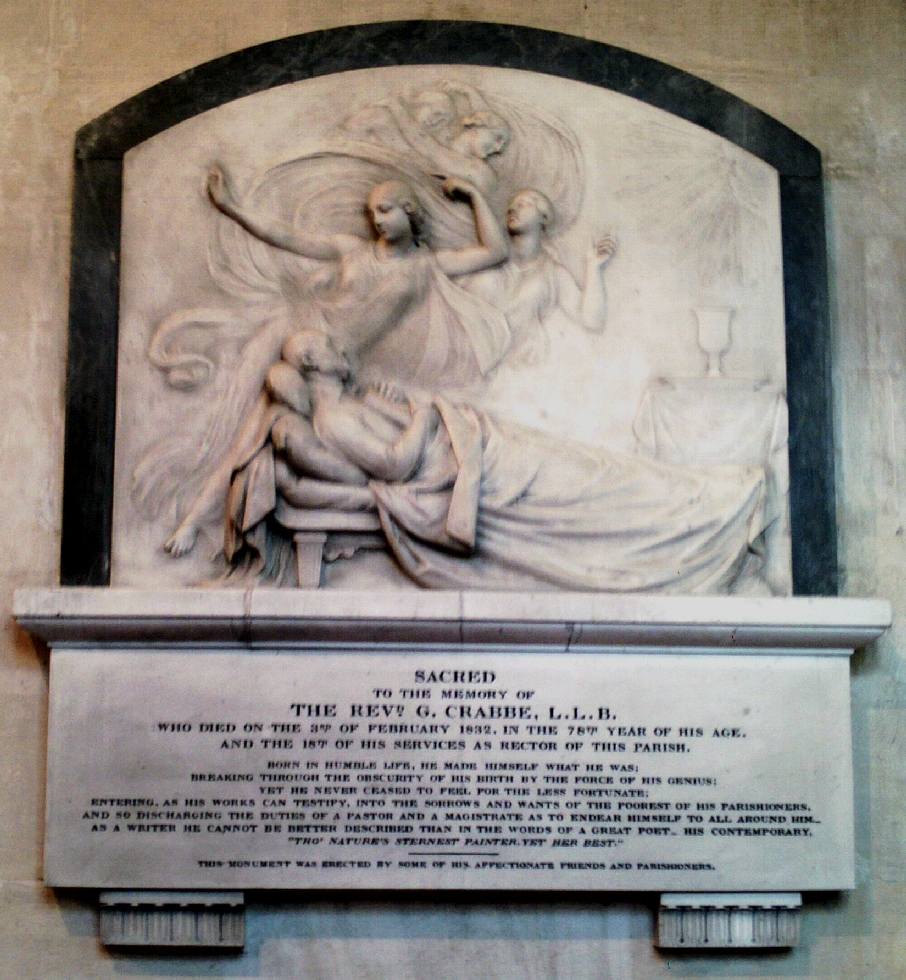
Monument in St James Church, Trowbridge, Wiltshire

The inscription reads:
SACRED to the memory of THE REV^{d} G. CRABBE L.L.B.
who died on 3 February 1832
in the 78th year of his age
and the 18th year of his services as rector of this parish.
Born in humble life, he made himself what he was; breaking through the obscurity of his birth by the force of his genius; yet he never ceased to feel for the less fortunate; entering, as his works can testify, into the sorrows and wants of the poorest of his parishioners, and so discharging the duties of a pastor and a magistrate as to endear himself to all around him, as a writer he cannot be better described than in the words of a great poet, his contemporary, "tho' nature's sternest painter, yet her best".
This monument was erected by some of his affectionate friends and parishioners.

In June 1819, Crabbe published his collection Tales of the Hall. The last 13 years of Crabbe's life were spent at Trowbridge, varied by occasional visits among his friends at Bath and the surrounding neighbourhood, and by yearly visits to his friend Samuel Hoare Jr in Hampstead. From there it was easy to visit his literary friends in London, while William Wordsworth, Southey, and others occasionally stayed with the family. Around 1820 Crabbe began suffering from frequent severe attacks of neuralgia, and this illness, together with his age, made him less and less able to travel to London.

In the spring of 1822, Crabbe met Walter Scott for the first time in London, and promised to visit him in Scotland in the autumn. He kept this promise during George IV's visit to Edinburgh, in the course of which the King met Scott and the poet was given a wine glass from which the King had drunk. Scott returned from the meeting with the King to find Crabbe at his home. As John Gibson Lockhart related in his Life of Sir Walter Scott,

Scott entered the room that had been set aside for Crabbe, wet and hurried, and embraced Crabbe with brotherly affection. The royal gift was forgotten—the ample skirt of the coat within which it had been packed, and which he had hitherto held cautiously in front of his person, slipped back to its more usual position—he sat down beside Crabbe, and the glass was crushed to atoms. His scream and gesture made his wife conclude that he had sat down on a pair of scissors, or the like: but very little harm had been done except the breaking of the glass.

Later in 1822, Crabbe was invited to spend Christmas at Belvoir Castle, but was unable to make the trip because of the winter weather. While at home, he continued to write a large amount of poetry, leaving 21 manuscript volumes at his death. A selection from these formed the Posthumous Poems, published in 1834. Crabbe continued to visit at Hampstead throughout the 1820s, often meeting the writer Joanna Baillie and her sister Agnes. In the autumn of 1831, Crabbe visited the Hoares. He left them in November, expressing his pain and sadness at leaving in a letter, feeling that it might be the last time he saw them. He left Clifton in November, and went direct to his son George, at Pucklechurch. He was able to preach twice for his son, who congratulated him on the power of his voice, and other encouraging signs of strength. "I will venture a good sum, sir," he said, "that you will be assisting me ten years hence." "Ten weeks" was Crabbe's answer, and the prediction was right almost to the day.

After a short time at Pucklechurch, Crabbe returned to his home at Trowbridge. Early in January he reported continued drowsiness, which he felt was a sign of increasing weakness. Later in the month he was prostrated by a severe cold. Other complications arose, and it soon became apparent that he would not live much longer. He died on 3 February 1832, with his two sons and his faithful nurse by his side.

== Poetry ==
Crabbe's poetry was predominantly in the form of heroic couplets, and has been described as unsentimental in its depiction of provincial life and society. John Wilson wrote that "Crabbe is confessedly the most original and vivid painter of the vast varieties of common life that England has ever produced;" and that "In all the poetry of this extraordinary man, we see a constant display of the passions as they are excited and exacerbated by the customs, laws, and institutions of society." The Cambridge History of English Literature saw Crabbe's importance to be more in his influence than in his works themselves: "He gave the poetry of nature new worlds to conquer (rather than conquered them himself) by showing that the world of plain fact and common detail may be material for poetry".

Although Augustan literature played an important role in Crabbe's life and poetical career, his body of work is unique and difficult to classify. His best works are an original achievement in a new realistic poetical form. The major factor in Crabbe's evolving from the Augustan influence to his use of realistic narrative was the changing readership of the late 18th–early 19th century. In the mid-18th century, literature was confined to the aristocratic and highly educated class; with the rise of the middle class at the turn of the 19th century, which came with a growing number of provincial papers, the heightening in production of books in weekly instalments, and the establishment of circulating libraries, the need for literature was spread throughout the middle class.

Narrative poetry was not a generally accepted mode in Augustan literature, making the narrative form of Crabbe's mature works an innovation. This was due to some extent to the rise in popularity of the novel in the late 18th–early 19th century. Another innovation is the attention that Crabbe pays to details, both in description and characterization. Augustan critics had espoused the view that minute details should be avoided in favour of generality. Crabbe also broke with Augustan tradition by not dealing with exalted and aristocratic characters, but rather choosing people from middle and working-class society. Poor characters like Crabbe's often anthologized "Peter Grimes" from The Borough would have been completely unacceptable to Augustan critics. In this way, Crabbe created a new way of presenting life and society in poetry.

== Criticism ==
Wordsworth predicted that Crabbe's poetry would last "from its combined merits as truth and poetry fully as long as anything that has been expressed in verse since it first made its appearance", though on another occasion, according to Henry Crabb Robinson, he "blamed Crabbe for his unpoetical mode of considering human nature and society." This latter opinion was also held by William Hazlitt, who complained that Crabbe's characters "remind one of anatomical preservations; or may be said to bear the same relation to actual life that a stuffed cat in a glass-case does to the real one purring on the hearth." Byron, besides what he said in English Bards and Scotch Reviewers, declared, in 1816, that he considered Crabbe and Coleridge "the first of these times in point of power and genius." Byron had felt that English poetry had been steadily on the decline since the depreciation of Pope, and pointed to Crabbe as the last remaining hope of a degenerate age.

Other admirers included Jane Austen, Alfred, Lord Tennyson, and Sir Walter Scott, who used numerous quotes from Crabbe's poems in his novels. During Scott's final illness, Crabbe was the last writer he asked to have read to him. Lord Byron admired Crabbe's poetry, and called him "nature's sternest painter, yet the best". According to critic Frank Whitehead, "Crabbe, in his verse tales in particular, is an important—indeed, a major—poet whose work has been and still is seriously undervalued." His early poems, which were non-narrative essays in poetical form, gained him the approval of literary men like Samuel Johnson, followed by a period of 20 years in which he wrote much, destroying most of it, and published nothing. In 1807, he published his volume Poems which started off the new realistic narrative method that characterised his poetry for the rest of his career. Whitehead states that this narrative poetry, which occupies the bulk of Crabbe's output, should be at the centre of modern critical attention.

Q. D. Leavis said of Crabbe: "He is (or ought to be—for who reads him?) a living classic." His classic status was also supported by T. S. Eliot in an essay on the poetry of Samuel Johnson in which Eliot grouped Crabbe together favourably with Johnson, Pope and several other poets. Eliot said that "to have the virtues of good prose is the first and minimum requirement of good poetry." Critic Arthur Pollard believes that Crabbe definitely met this qualification. Critic William Caldwell Roscoe, answering William Hazlitt's question of why Crabbe had not in fact written prose rather than verse said "have you ever read Crabbe's prose? Look at his letters, especially the later ones, look at the correct but lifeless expression of his dedications and prefaces—then look at his verse, and you will see how much he has exceeded 'the minimum requirement of good poetry'." The critic F. L. Lucas summed up Crabbe's qualities: "naïve, yet shrewd; straightforward, yet sardonic; blunt, yet tender; quiet, yet passionate; realistic, yet romantic." Crabbe, who is seen as a complicated poet, has been and often still is dismissed as too narrow in his interests and in his way of responding to them in his poetry. "At the same time as the critic is making such judgments, he is all too often aware that Crabbe, nonetheless, defies classification", says Pollard.

Pollard has attempted to examine the negative views of Crabbe and the reasons for limited readership since his lifetime: "Why did Crabbe's 'realism' and his discovery of what in effect was the short story in verse fail to appeal to the fiction-dominated Victorian age? Or is it that somehow psychological analysis and poetry are uneasy bedfellows? But then why did Browning succeed and Crabbe descend to the doldrums or to the coteries of admiring enthusiasts? And why have we in this century [the 20th century] failed to get much nearer to him? Does this mean that each succeeding generation must struggle to find his characteristic and essential worth? FitzGerald was only one of many among those who would make 'cullings from' or 'readings in' Crabbe. The implications of such selection are clearly that, though much has vanished, much deserves to remain."

== Entomology ==
Crabbe was known as a coleopterist and recorder of beetles, and is credited for discovering the first specimen of Calosoma sycophanta L. to be recorded from Suffolk. He published an essay on the Natural History of the Vale of Belvoir in John Nichols's, Bibliotheca Topographia Britannica, VIII, Antiquities in Leicestershire, 1790. It includes a very extensive list of local coleopterans, and references more than 70 species.

== Bibliography ==
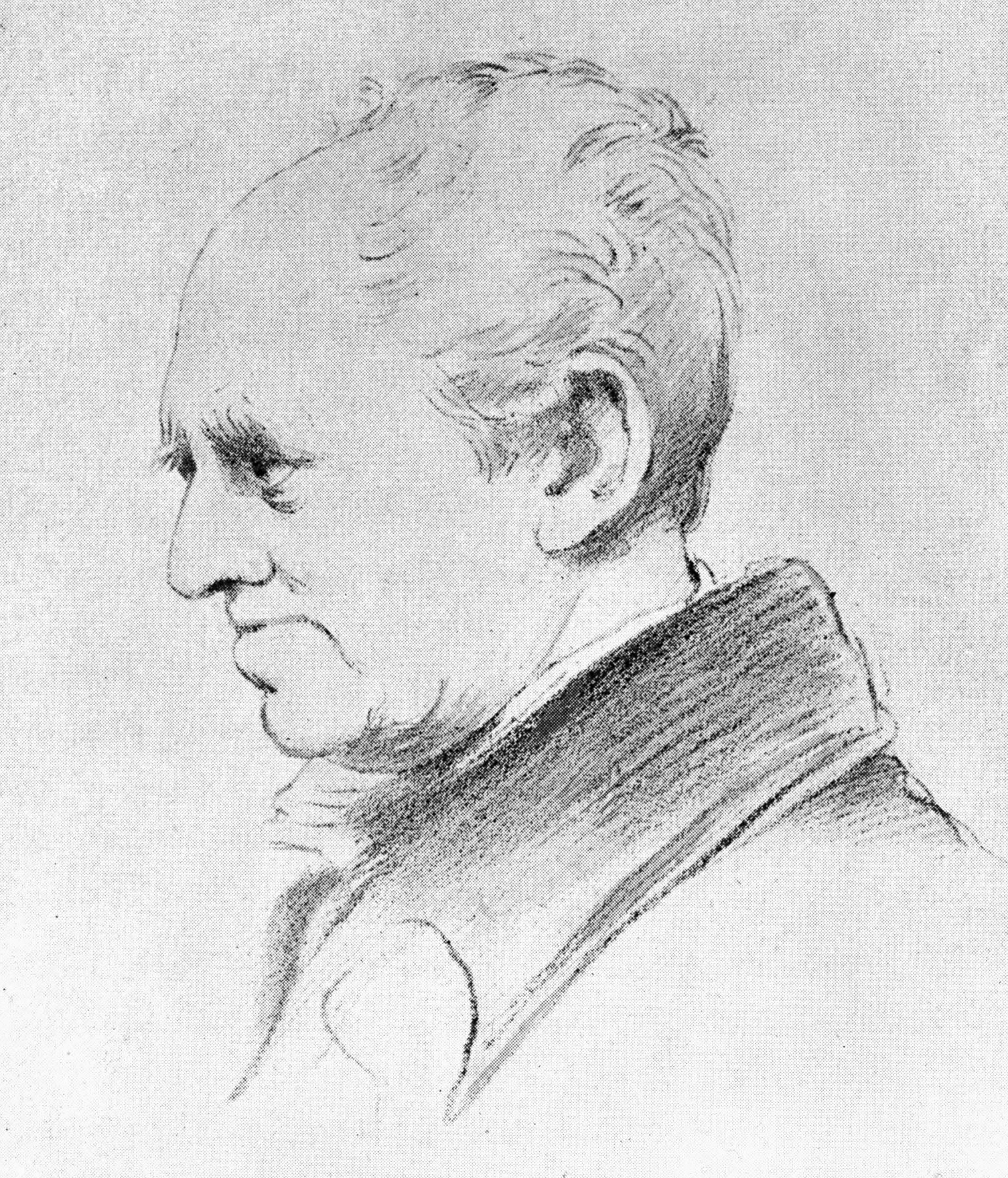
Sketch of Crabbe, 1826

- Inebriety (published 1775)
- The Candidate (published 1780)
- The Library (published 1781)
- The Village (published 1782)
- The Newspaper (published 1785)
- Poems (published 1807)
- The Borough (published 1810)
- Tales in Verse (published 1812)
- Tales of the Hall (published 1819)
- Posthumous Tales (published 1834)
- New Poems by George Crabbe (published 1960)
- Complete Poetical Works (published 1988)
- The Voluntary Insane (published 1995)

== Adaptations ==
Benjamin Britten's opera Peter Grimes is based on The Borough. Britten also set an extract from The Borough as the third of his Five Flower Songs, Op. 47. Charles Lamb's verse play The Wife's Trial; or, The Intruding Widow, written in 1827 and published the following year in Blackwood's Magazine, was based on Crabbe's tale "The Confidant".

== Sources ==
- Crabbe, George Jr. (1901). The Life and Poetical Works of George Crabbe, Vol 1. London: J. Murray.
- Ainger, Alfred (1903). Crabbe. New York: Macmillan.
- Kebble, T. E. (1888). Life of Crabbe. London: Walter Scott.
- Whitehead, Frank (1995). George Crabbe: A Reappraisal. Susquehanna University Press. ISBN 0945636709.
- Pollard, Arthur, ed. (2003). George Crabbe: The Critical Heritage. Taylor & Francis e-Library. ISBN 0203196317.
