= The Borough (poem) =

1810 poem by George Crabbe

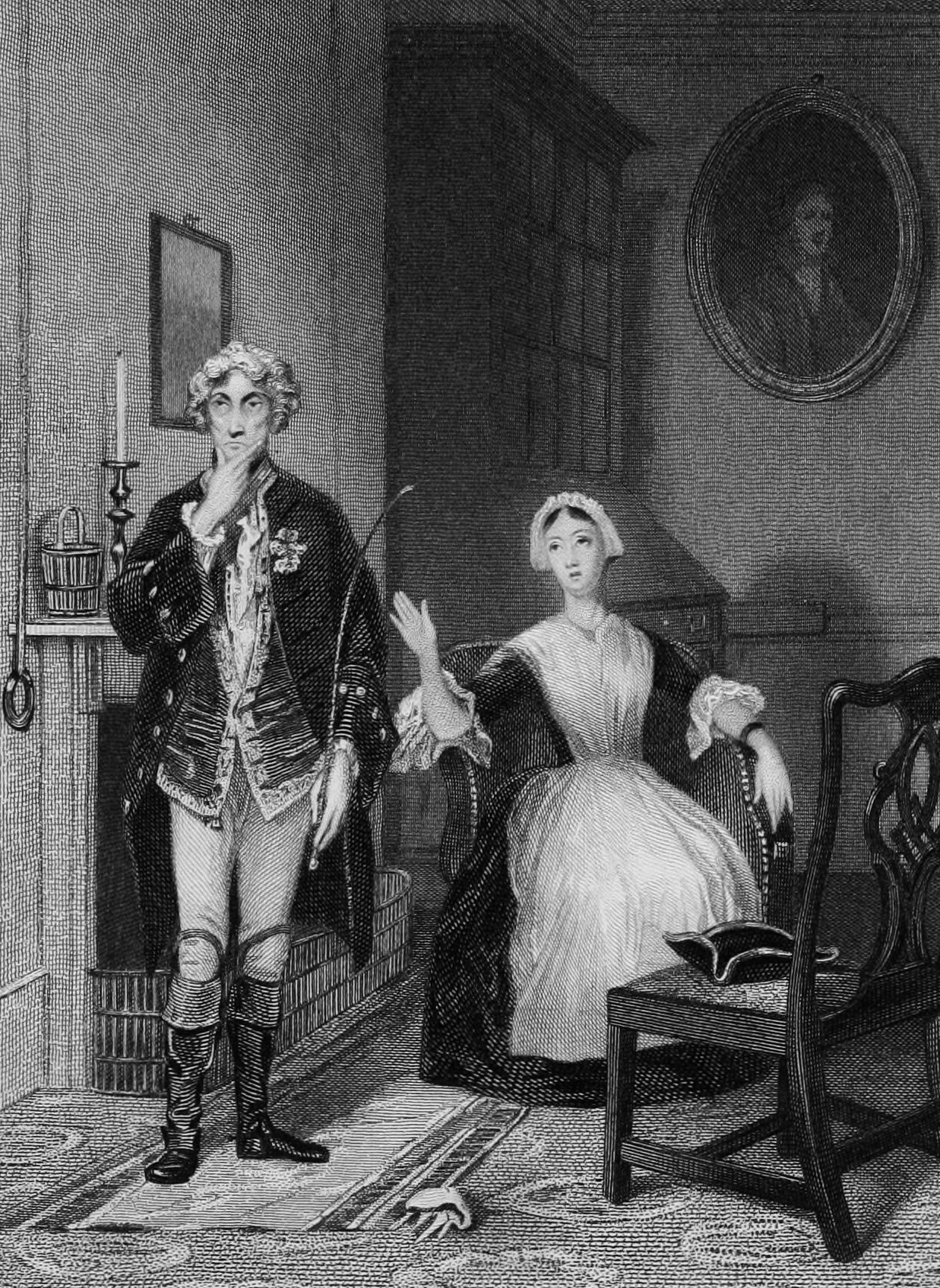
Abel Keene from The Borough, letter XXI

The Borough is a collection of poems by George Crabbe published in 1810. Written in heroic couplets, the poems are arranged as a series of 24 letters, covering various aspects of borough life and detailing the stories of certain inhabitants' lives.

Of the letters, the best known is that of Peter Grimes in Letter XXII, which formed the basis for Benjamin Britten's opera of the same name. Letter XXI describes Abel Keene, a village schoolmaster and then a merchant's clerk who was led astray, lost his place and finally hanged himself.

The poem was begun in 1804, three years before the publication of The Parish Register, and demonstrates a clear development in Crabbe's writing between the pastoral concerns shown in The Village, and the concentration on the life stories of individuals as seen in the Tales.
