= The Borough =

The Boro or The Borough may refer to:

- The Borough, an area of London also known as Southwark
- The Borough (poem)
- The Boro, a nickname for Middlesbrough F.C.
- The Boro, a nickname for Scarborough Athletic F.C.
