= The Deserted Village =

1770 poem by Oliver Goldsmith

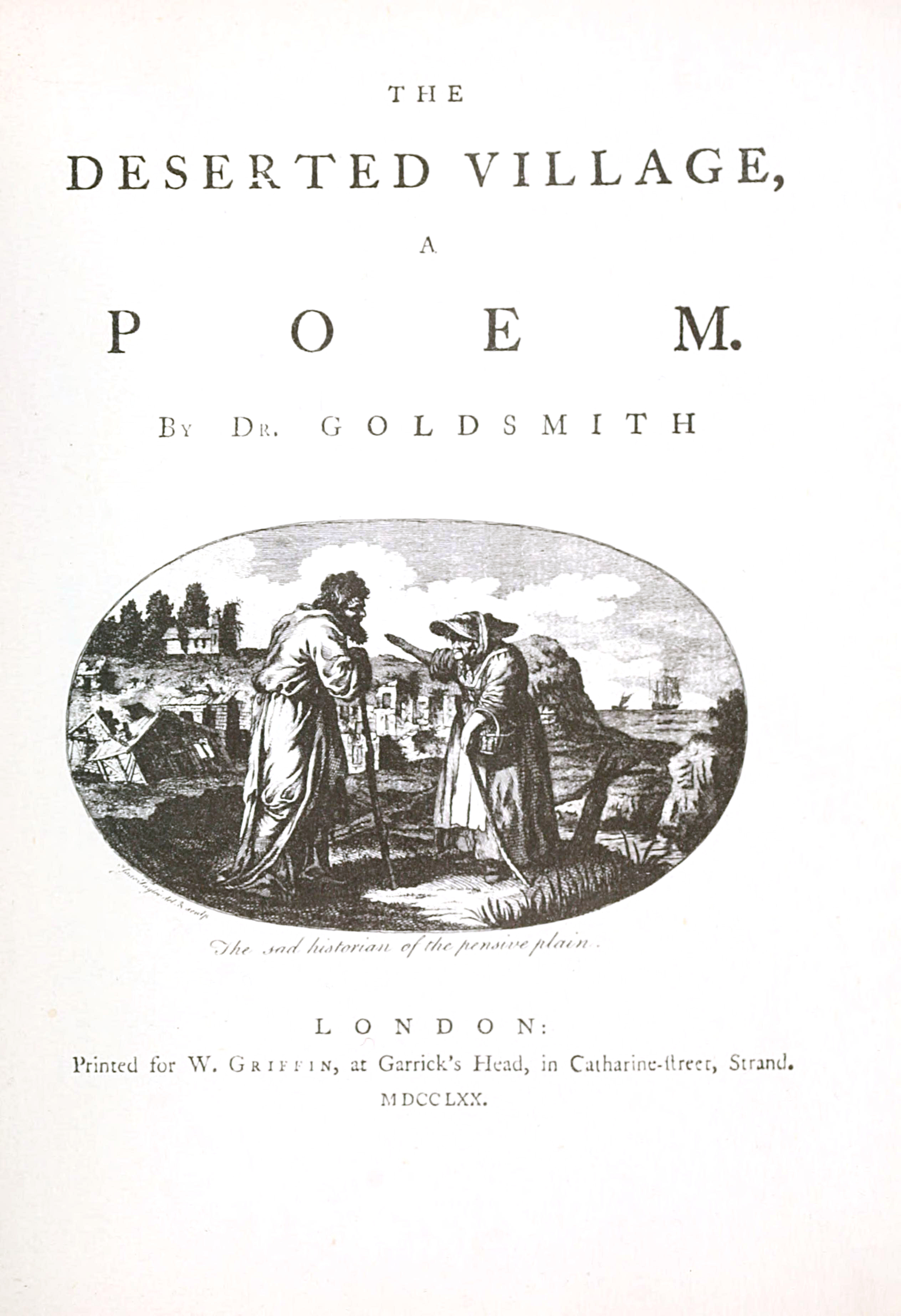
Title page of the first edition

The Deserted Village is a poem by Anglo-Irish poet and hack writer Oliver Goldsmith. The poem was first published in 1770. It is a work of social commentary, and condemns rural depopulation and the pursuit of excessive wealth.

The poem is written in heroic couplets, and describes the decline of a village and the emigration of many of its residents to America. In the poem, Goldsmith criticises rural depopulation, the moral corruption found in towns, consumerism, enclosure, landscape gardening, avarice, and the pursuit of wealth from international trade. The poem employs, in the words of one critic, "deliberately precise obscurity", and does not reveal the reason why the village has been deserted. The poem was very popular in the eighteenth and nineteenth centuries, but also provoked critical responses, including from other poets such as George Crabbe. References to the poem, and particularly its ominous "Ill fares the land" warning, have appeared in a number of other contexts.

== Background ==
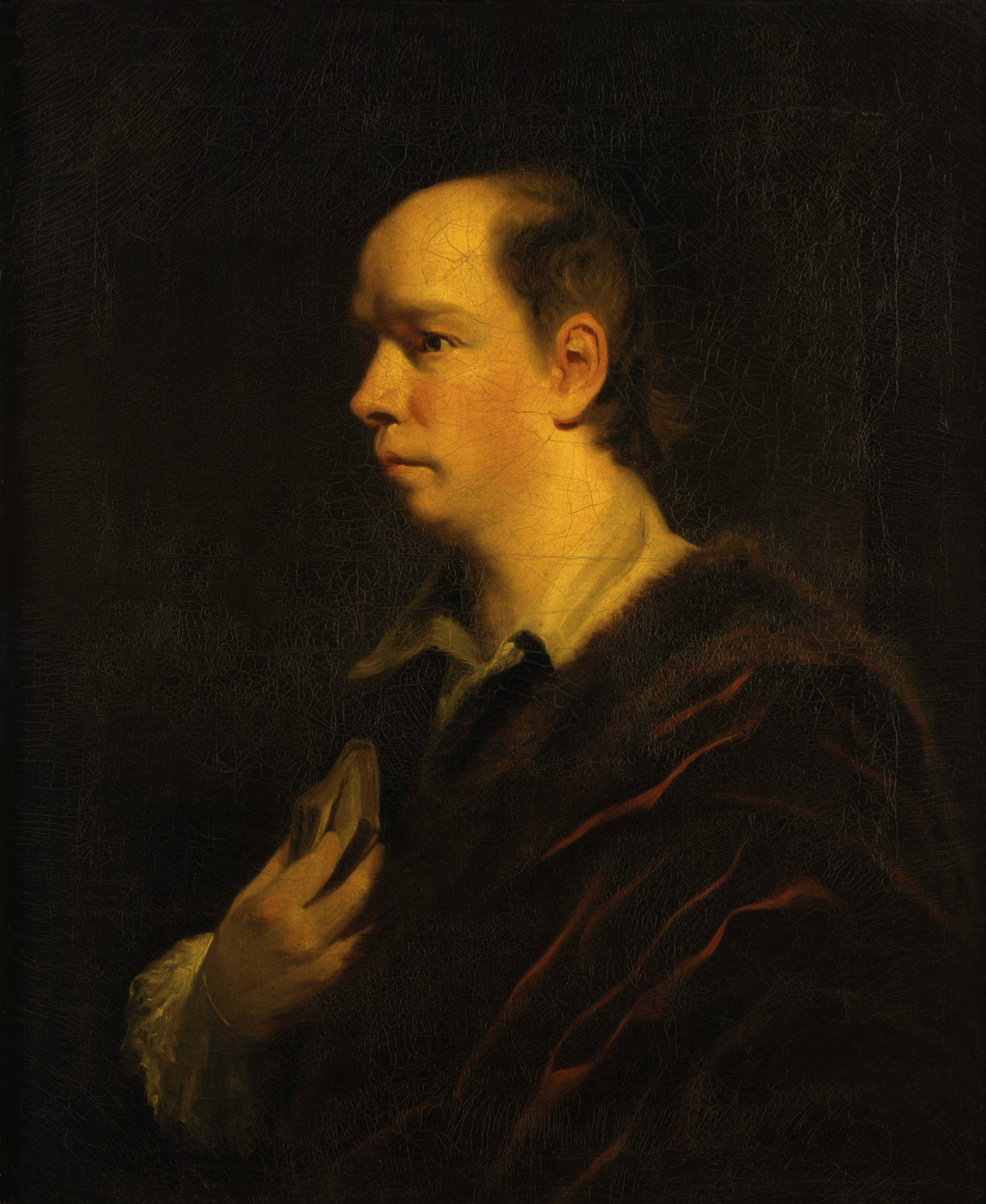
Oliver Goldsmith by Sir Joshua Reynolds (c. 1770)

Goldsmith grew up in the hamlet of Lissoy in Ireland. In the 1760s, he travelled extensively around England, visiting many small settlements at a time when the enclosure movement was at its height.

The poem is dedicated to the artist Sir Joshua Reynolds, with whom Goldsmith was a close friend and founding member, along with Samuel Johnson, of a dining society called The Club. Reynolds had helped to promote Goldsmith's play The Good-Natur'd Man to the actor and theatre manager David Garrick, and had facilitated Goldsmith's appointment as the historian of the Royal Academy.

The Deserted Village condemns rural depopulation and the indulgence of the rich. This was a subject that Goldsmith had addressed in his earlier poem The Traveller; or a Prospect of Society (1764), which also condemned the corrupting influence of extreme wealth. Goldsmith also set out his ideas about rural depopulation in an essay entitled "The Revolution in Low Life", published in Lloyd's Evening Post in 1762.

There is no single place which has been identified as the village of the poem's title, called Auburn in the poem. Although some contend that the location of the poem's deserted village is unknown, others note that Auburn village close to Athlone is the likely subject of Goldsmith's poem. Travel-guide authors Samuel Carter Hall and Anna Hall write in their 1853 Hand-books for Ireland: The West and Connamara that the British tourist should disembark from their train at Athlone's Moate Station and "make a pilgrimage to the renowned village of Auburn" located six miles from Moate Station (Hall & Hall, 1853, pp. 4–5). The Halls explain that although Goldsmith was born in the village of Pallas (also known as Pallice or Pallasmore), his father was soon appointed to the Kilkenny-West Rectory, and he therefore moved his family (circa 1730) to the village of Auburn, also known as Lissoy and, to the locals, as "The Pigeons" (ibid.). Lissoy has "now and for nearly a century [been] known as Auburn" and is "so marked on the maps" (ibid.). For a similar claim regarding Auburn in County Westmeath as the Auburn of Goldsmith's The Deserted Village, see J. Stirling Coyne and N.P. Willis's The Scenery and Antiquities of Ireland published c. 1841 (Vol. 1, Chap. 4). Others speculate merely that "the description may have been influenced by Goldsmith's memory of his childhood in rural Ireland, and his travels around England."

While personal references in the poem give the impression of referring to the village in which Goldsmith grew up, the poem has also been associated with Nuneham Courtenay in Oxfordshire. In "The Revolution in Low Life", Goldsmith had condemned the destruction of a village within 50 miles (80 km) of London in order to construct a fashionable landscape garden. Goldsmith reported that he had personally witnessed this scene in 1761. In the same year, Nuneham Courtenay was removed to make way for Nuneham Park. Its owner—Simon Harcourt, 1st Earl Harcourt—moved the village 1.5 miles (2.4 km) away. There are a number of other concordances between Nuneham Courtenay's destruction and the contents of The Deserted Village. At Nuneham Courtenay, only an old woman was allowed to remain living in her house—Goldsmith's poem features an old woman who returns to the village, and she is depicted on the title page of the first edition. The position of both villages, on a hill near a river, was similar, and both had parsons who enjoyed gardening.

However, Robert Seitz has argued that while "The Revolution in Low Life" greatly strengthens the case for identifying the deserted village as English, Goldsmith saw in this unnamed village "only what he wished to see", using it to fit a set of political and social ideas which were "made up largely of elements absorbed in Ireland".

== Analysis ==
=== Synopsis ===
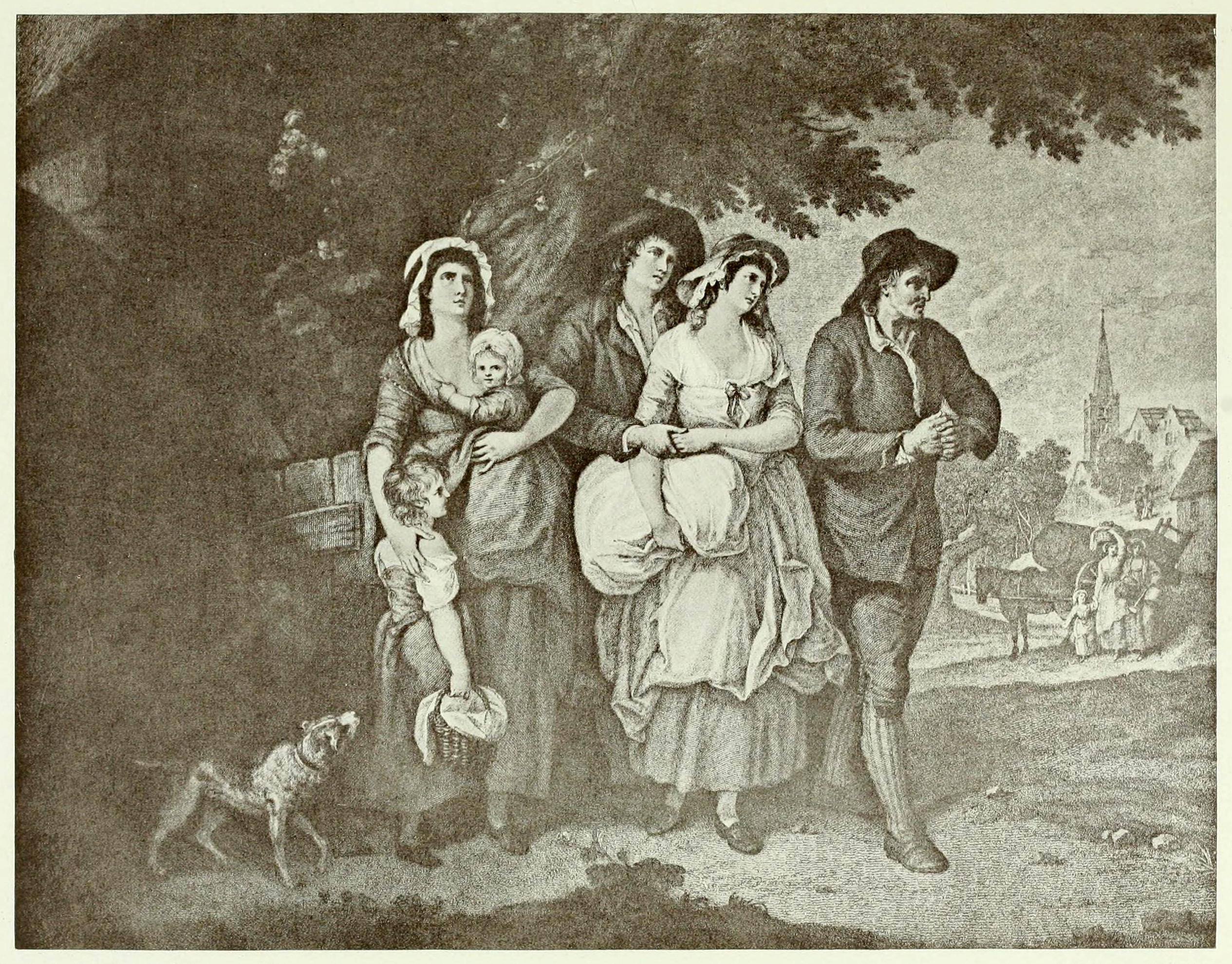
The Deserted Village, engraved by Francesco Bartolozzi after a painting by Francis Wheatley. This image was used in the edition of Goldsmith's poem published in 1800 by F. J. du Roveray.

The poem opens with a description of a village named Auburn, written in the past tense.

Sweet Auburn! loveliest village of the plain;
Where health and plenty cheered the labouring swain,
Where smiling spring its earliest visit paid,
And parting summer's lingering blooms delayed (lines 1–4).

The poem then moves on to describe the village in its current state, reporting that it has been abandoned by its residents with its buildings ruined.

Sunk are thy bowers in shapeless ruin all,
And the long grass o'ertops the mouldering wall;
And trembling, shrinking from the spoiler's hand,
Far, far away thy children leave the land
Ill fares the land, to hastening ills a prey,
Where wealth accumulates, and men decay (lines 47–52)

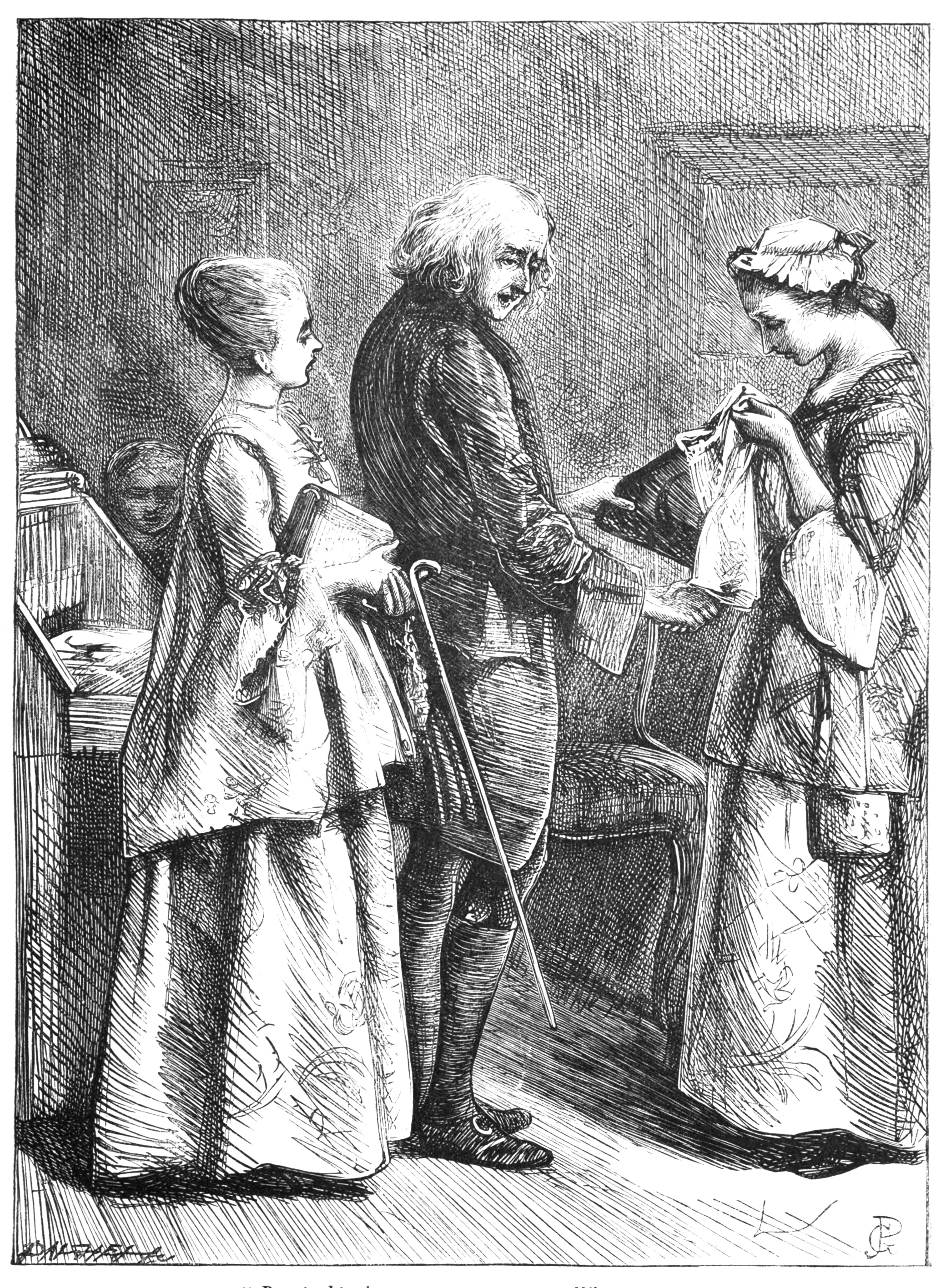
Depiction of the parson, from an illustrated edition of the poem produced by the Dalziel Brothers

After nostalgic descriptions of Auburn's parson, schoolmaster and alehouse, Goldsmith makes a direct attack on the usurpation of agricultural land by the wealthy:

... The man of wealth and pride
Takes up a space that many poor supplied;
Space for his lake, his park's extended bounds,
Space for his horses, equipage, and hounds:
The robe that wraps his limbs in silken sloth
Has robbed the neighbouring fields of half their growth (lines 275–300)

The poem later condemns the luxury and corruption of the city, and describes the fate of a country girl who moved there:

Where the poor houseless shivering female lies.
She once, perhaps, in village plenty blessed,
Has wept at tales of innocence distressed;
Her modest looks the cottage might adorn,
Sweet as the primrose peeps beneath the thorn:
Now lost to all; her friends, her virtue fled,
Near her betrayer's door she lays her head,
And, pinched with cold, and shrinking from the shower,
With heavy heart deplores that luckless hour,
When idly first, ambitious of the town,
She left her wheel and robes of country brown. (Lines 326–36)

Goldsmith then states that the residents of Auburn have not moved to the city, but have emigrated overseas. He describes these foreign lands as follows:

Far different there from all that charmed before
The various terrors of that horrid shore;
Those blazing suns that dart a downward ray,
And fiercely shed intolerable day (lines 345–8)

The poem mentions "wild Altama", perhaps a reference to the "Altamaha River" in Georgia, an American colony founded by James Oglethorpe to receive paupers and criminals from Britain. As the poem nears its end, Goldsmith gives a warning, before reporting that even Poetry herself has fled abroad:

Even now the devastation is begun,
And half the business of destruction done;
Even now, methinks, as pondering here I stand,
I see the rural virtues leave the land.
Down where yon anchoring vessel spreads the sail (lines 395–9)

The poem ends with the hope that Poetry can help those who have been exiled:

Still let thy voice, prevailing over time,
Redress the rigours of the inclement clime;
Aid slighted truth with thy persuasive strain,
Teach erring man to spurn the rage of gain;
Teach him, that states of native strength possest,
Tho' very poor, may still be very blest;
That trade's proud empire hastes to swift decay,
As ocean sweeps the labour'd mole away;
While self-dependent power can time defy,
As rocks resist the billows and the sky. (Lines 421–30)

=== Genre, prosody and influences ===
The poem has 430 lines, divided into heroic couplets. This form features an "AABBCC..." rhyme scheme, with ten-syllable lines written in iambic pentameter. It is an example of georgic and pastoral poetry. The poem is also an example of Augustan verse. In its use of a balanced account of Auburn in its inhabited and deserted states, and in its employment of an authorly persona within the poem, it conforms to contemporary neoclassical conventions.

Goldsmith was educated at Trinity College, Dublin, and had read Latin poetry since childhood. He would, therefore, have been aware of the criticisms made by classical writers such as Juvenal and Pliny of the displacement of the rural poor by the rich. Furthermore, in the eighteenth century the decline of the Roman Empire was attributed to the growth of luxury and pride in Rome. Goldsmith, in emphasising the danger that England faced from its increase in wealth, was drawing an obvious parallel. Ricardo Quintana has argued that the poem takes Virgil's first Eclogue as its model.

Quintana has also highlighted the way that the poem presents a series of contrasts. In the early parts of the poem, old "Sweet Auburn" and the deserted village are contrasted. Later in the poem, Quintana argues, Goldsmith places nature and art, frugality and luxury, "national vigor and national corruption", and the country and the city, in opposition.

=== Social commentary ===
The Deserted Village condemns rural depopulation, the enclosure of common land, the creation of landscape gardens and the pursuit of excessive wealth. In Goldsmith's vision, wealth does not necessarily bring either prosperity or happiness. Indeed, it can be dangerous to the maintenance of British liberties and displaces traditional community. In making this argument, some have regarded Goldsmith not as a political radical, but as a socially-concerned "conservative". Indeed, his emphasis on the corrupting effects of luxury fit closely with discourses associated with Tory writers of the time.

Sebastian Mitchell has argued that Goldsmith employs "deliberately precise obscurity" in the poem, concealing the reason for the village's demise. While this may detract from the authority of Goldsmith's social critique, it also allows readers to project their own concerns onto the poem. Bell comments that while Goldsmith criticises enclosure in an indirect manner, he does not attribute Auburn's decline to it. However, Bell also argues that commerce is clearly the "arch-villain of the piece", and it is the riches that a small minority have accumulated from international trade that allow rural people to be displaced from their lands so that country estates can be created. Furthermore, Alfred Lutz has commented that Goldsmith's attacks on landscape gardening have a wider political significance, because enclosure's defenders sometimes compared enclosed fields to gardens.

Mitchell also argues that criticism which focuses solely on the poem's historical accuracy misses its wider commentary on late-eighteenth-century social issues, particularly the question of "urban estrangement".

== Publication history ==
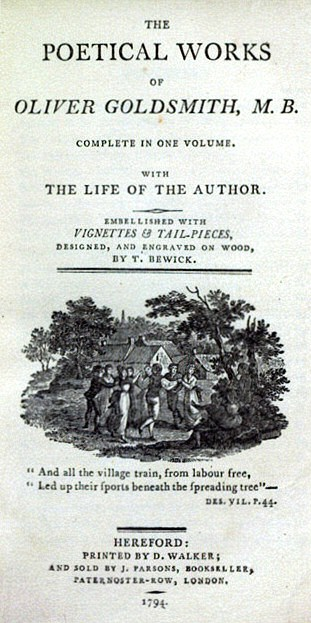
Title page of Goldsmith's poetical works, with vignette by Thomas Bewick and couplet from The Deserted Village, 1794

The poem was completed in 1769, and was first published in May 1770. Appearing in quarto format, five further editions were released in the same year.

It was published in eleven editions in the United States by the end of the century.

=== Illustrations and other artwork ===
The title page of the first edition featured an engraving by Isaac Taylor. The illustration depicts the old woman mentioned in the poem, standing in front of the deserted village. In the background a ship departs, presumably for America.

Thomas Bewick and his school also produced several depictions of scenes from The Deserted Village, some of which occurred as illustrations of published versions of the poem or Goldsmith's works. In 1794, Bewick produced woodcuts to illustrate a volume entitled The Poetical Works of Oliver Goldsmith. In the following year, Bewick and his brother John Bewick (1760-1795) again engraved illustrations for a volume entitled Poems by Goldsmith and Parnell. The magnitude of this project meant that Bewick enlisted several collaborators to produce the illustrations.

Bewick also depicted scenes from The Deserted Village which appeared in other places. An engraving of his edition of Fables of Aesop, published in 1818, features a scene depicting a quotation from the poem carved into a rock.

The painter Francis Wheatley submitted two paintings to the Royal Academy of Arts in 1800, both of which depicted scenes from The Deserted Village. The paintings were copied by an engraver, and appeared in an edition of Goldsmith's poetry published in the same year by F. J. du Roveray.

== Critical reception ==
=== Eighteenth-century reception ===
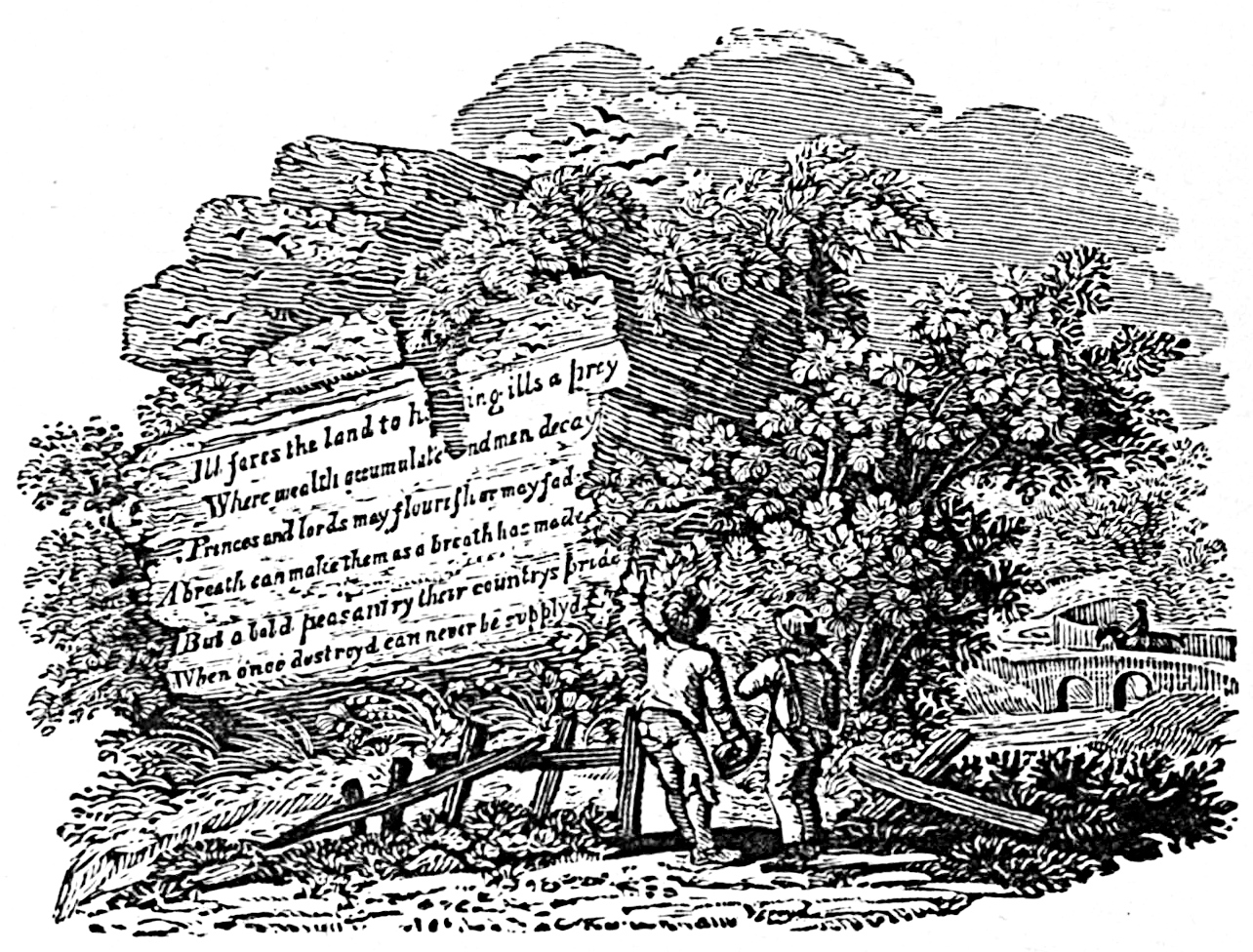
Thomas Bewick's wood engraving Ill Fares the Land, a vignette showing a fragment of Goldsmith's poem apparently carved on a great rock

Alfred Lutz has argued that the poem generated two different types of reception. Firstly, some readers admired Goldsmith's economic and social arguments, or at least reflected upon them in their own writings. Political radicals, such as Thomas Spence and John Thelwall quoted The Deserted Village in their own works, as did a number of other writers. Secondly, readers and critics ignored the political content of the poem, focussing instead on Goldsmith's idyllic descriptions of Auburn. This second type of reading was the most common. Sebastian Mitchell states that some modern critics have seen the poem as appearing at a turning point in British culture, when public social and political opinions, and private emotional dispositions, diverged. With the publication of texts such as Adam Smith's The Wealth of Nations (1776) shortly after The Deserted Village, political and economic discussion increasingly became the preserve not of poetry, but of a "scientific" version of political economy.

In the United States, a different reading occurred—while the English Auburn may have been deserted, the new world offered opportunities for the recreation of Goldsmith's idyll.

Early critics also questioned the validity of Goldsmith's argument about rural depopulation and decline. In 1770, for instance, Thomas Comber argued that the population of rural England was not decreasing, and that enclosure could increase farmers' demand for labourers. An early review in The Critical Review also defended the value of England's increase in wealth, and questioned whether rural depopulation had become an important problem. Modern economic historians have supported Comber's comments about depopulation. George Crabbe's poem The Village (1783) was written as a riposte to what its author saw as the excessive sentimentality of Goldsmith's verse. In his poem, Crabbe describes the hardships of the rural poor, in a way that Goldsmith did not. Furthermore, Crabbe's poem encourages the interpretation of Goldsmith's bucolic depiction of old "sweet Auburn" in The Deserted Village as being a representation of the status quo in 1770, rather than a depiction of an idealised past through which current moral decline can be highlighted. The Deserted Village is, in this interpretation, "depoliticised"—an act that was reinforced by nineteenth-century interpretations produced by Thomas Babington Macaulay and two of Goldsmith's biographers.

The poem also generated other responses in verse. While Crabbe emphasised the misery and poverty of rural life, Robert Bloomfield's The Farmer's Boy (1800) returned to the theme of the rural idyll, but without Goldsmith or Crabbe's political criticism. The Deserted Village was a major influence on Bloomfield, as was Alexander Pope's pastoral poetry.

=== Later reception ===
The poem's reception in the Victorian era was largely positive. The Irish playwright Edmund Falconer (c. 1814–1879) adapted the work to suit as opera libretto for the three-act opera of the same name (1880) by John William Glover (1815–1899).

=== Cultural references ===
The poem has influenced the production of several notable cultural works. In 1825, Goldsmith's great-nephew—also called Oliver Goldsmith—wrote a response to his relative's poem, entitled The Rising Village.

The first half of line 51 from the poem ("Ill fares the land, to hastening ills a prey") has provided a title to several books and films, including Carey McWilliams's Ill Fares the Land: Migrants and Migratory Labor in the United States (1942) and Ill Fares the Land (2010) by Tony Judt.

Line 170 (in capitals: "ALLURED TO BRIGHTER WORLDS, AND LED THE WAY") appears inscribed on the plinth of a statue of Queen Victoria and Prince Albert in Saxon dress. The marble original with plinth is in the Royal Collection, and a copy of the sculpture is in the National Portrait Gallery in London. The sculpture memorialises Albert's early death.

In Ireland the village described in the poem is thought to be Glasson village, near Athlone. Signage around the village points out the association with Oliver Goldsmith.

In American popular culture, and specifically that of Alabama, the poem's first line "Sweet Auburn, Loveliest village of the plain" is the basis for the term "Auburn Plainsman/Plainsmen" which is used to refer to an Auburn University student and is also the source for the name of the University student Newspaper, The Auburn Plainsman.

Mount Auburn Cemetery in Watertown and Cambridge, Massachusetts, is also named after the village in the poem.

The suburb of Auburn in Sydney is also named after the village.

On The Alan Parsons Project's 1984 album Ammonia Avenue, the title track contains the lyrics "And those who came at first to scoff, remained behind to pray, And those who came at first to scoff, remained behind to pray", derived (apparently) from Goldsmith's line "And fools, who came to scoff, remained to pray."

In Asimov's Foundation series book, "Forward the Foundation," 1993, Emperor Aegis XIV quotes, "Ill fares the land to hastening ills a prey/Where wealth accumulates, and men decay," to the protagonist Hari Seldon. Implying that whilst the Empire of their time is in a state of decline, wealthy individuals still exist.

== Notes and references ==
=== References ===
==== Books ====
- John A. Dussinger, 'Goldsmith, Oliver (1728?–1774)', Oxford Dictionary of National Biography, Oxford University Press, 2004.
- W. Roberts, F. Wheatley, R. A., his life and works (London: Otto Limited, 1910).
- Robin Taylor Gilbert, 'Taylor, Isaac (1730–1807)', Oxford Dictionary of National Biography, Oxford University Press, 2004.
- Jenny Uglow, Nature's Engraver: a Life of Thomas Bewick (London: Faber & Faber, 2006).

==== Articles ====
- Batey, Mavis (1968). "Nuneham Courtenay; an Oxfordshire 18th-century Deserted Village" (PDF). Oxoniensia. 33: 108–124.
- Bell, Howard J. (September 1944). "The Deserted Village and Goldsmith's Social Doctrines". PMLA. 59 (3): 747–772. doi:10.2307/459383. ISSN 0030-8129. JSTOR 459383.
- Cole, Richard (1970). "Oliver Goldsmith's Reputation in Ireland, 1762-74". Modern Philology. 68 (1): 65–70. doi:10.1086/390210.
- Jaarsma, Richard (1971). "Ethics in the Wasteland: Image and Structure in Goldsmith's The Deserted Village". Texas Studies in Literature and Language. 13 (3): 447–459.
- Kazmin, Roman (2006). "Oliver Goldsmith's The Traveller and The Deserted Village: Moral economy of landscape representation". English Studies. 87 (6): 653–668. doi:10.1080/00138380600953336.
- Lutz, Alfred (1998). "The Politics of Reception: The Case of Goldsmith's The Deserted Village". Studies in Philology. 95 (2): 174–196.
- Miner, Earl (February 1959). "The Making of The Deserted Village". Huntington Library Quarterly. 22 (2): 125–141. doi:10.2307/3816319. ISSN 0018-7895. JSTOR 3816319.
- Mitchell, S. (2006). "Oliver Goldsmith's the Deserted Village: Past, Present, and Future". English. 55 (212): 123–139. doi:10.1093/english/55.212.123.
- Quintana, Ricardo (December 1964). "The Deserted Village, Its Logical and Rhetorical Elements". College English. 26 (3): 204–214. doi:10.2307/373591. ISSN 0010-0994. JSTOR 373591.
- Seitz, Robert W. (June 1937). "The Irish Background of Goldsmith's Social and Political Thought". PMLA. 52 (2): 405–411. doi:10.2307/458598. ISSN 0030-8129. JSTOR 458598.
- Storm, Leo F. (May 1970). "Literary Convention in Goldsmith's Deserted Village". Huntington Library Quarterly. 33 (3): 243–256. doi:10.2307/3816638. ISSN 0018-7895. JSTOR 3816638.
