= The Village (poem) =

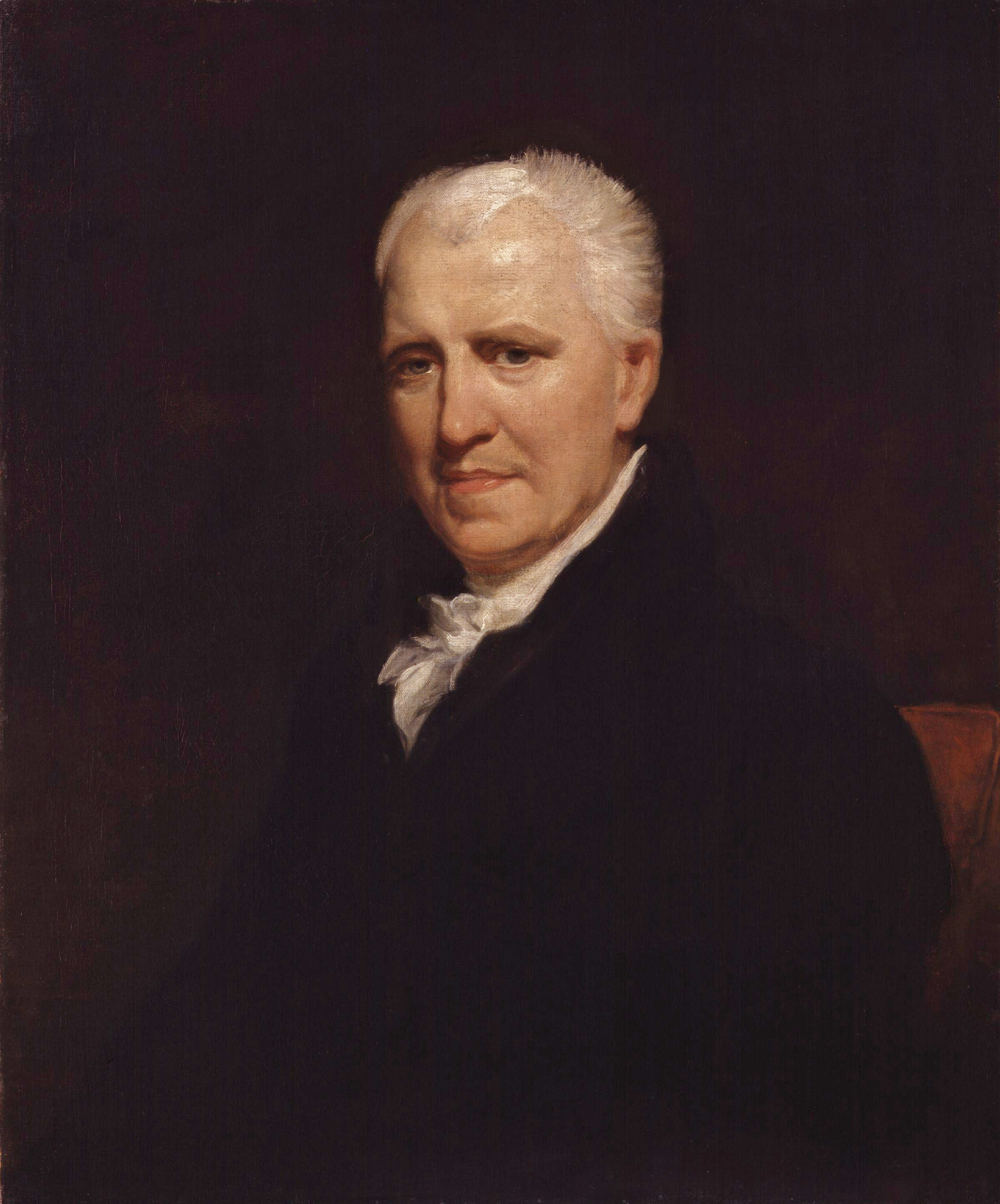
Portrait of Crabbe by Henry William Pickersgill

The Village is a narrative poem by George Crabbe, published in 1783. The poem contrasts the traditional representation of the rural idyll in Augustan poetry with the realities of village life.

== History ==
In early 1781 Crabbe wrote a letter to statesman and author Edmund Burke asking for help, in which he included samples of his poetry. Among the samples that Crabbe sent to Burke were pieces of his poems The Library and The Village which Burke viewed favourably, giving Crabbe a gift of money to relieve his immediate wants, and assuring him that he would do all in his power to further Crabbe's literary career. The Village was published in May 1783.

== Critical reception ==
Samuel Johnson said of the poem in a letter to Reynolds, "I have sent you back Mr. Crabbe's poem, which I read with great delight. It is original, vigorous, and elegant." Johnson's friend and biographer James Boswell also praised The Village. It was said at the time of publication that Johnson had made extensive changes to the poem, but Boswell responded by saying that "the aid given by Johnson to the poem, as to The Traveller and Deserted Village of Goldsmith, were so small as by no means to impair the distinguished merit of the author."

== Sources ==
- Ainger, Alfred (1903). Crabbe. New York: Macmillan.
- Kebble, T. E. (1888). Life of Crabbe. London: Walter Scott.
