= Heroic verse =

Class of poetic verse

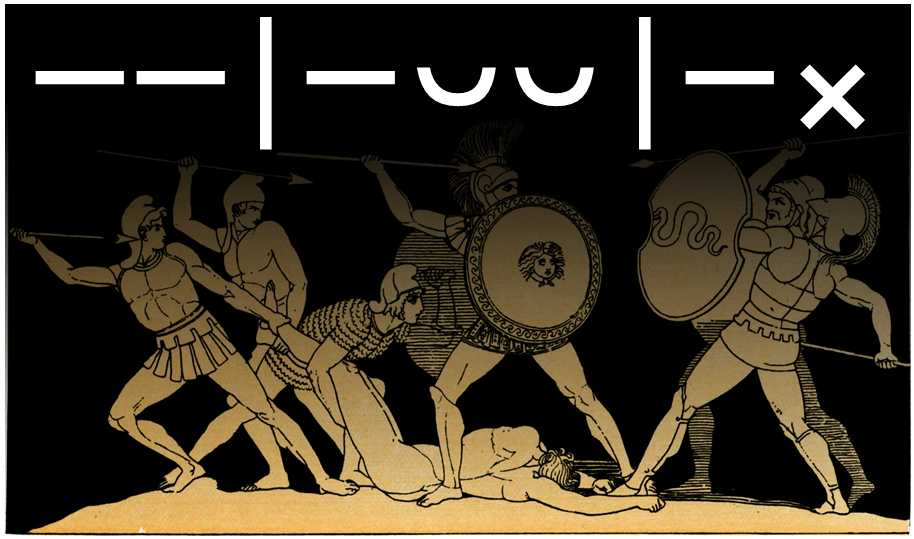
"Heroic verse": seems like it's describing the genre, but it's really describing the meter.

Heroic verse is a term that may be used to designate epic poems, but which is more usually used to describe the meter(s) in which those poems are most typically written (regardless of whether the content is "heroic" or not). Because the meter typically used to narrate heroic deeds differs by language and even within language by period, the specific meaning of "heroic verse" is dependent upon context.

== Greek and Latin ==
The oldest Greek verseform, and the Greek line for heroic verse, is the dactylic hexameter, which was already well-established in the 9th and 8th centuries B.C.E. when the Iliad and Odyssey were composed in this meter.

The Saturnian was used in Latin epics of the 3rd century B.C.E., but few examples remain and the meter is little understood. Beginning at least with Ennius (239–169 B.C.E.) dactylic hexameter was introduced in imitation of the Greeks, thereafter becoming the Latin heroic meter.

The Greek/Roman dactylic hexameter exerted a huge influence over the subsequent poetic practice of much of Europe, whether by the new accentual verseforms it evolved into (as the medieval riming leonine verse), by attempts at reviving it either quantitatively or accentually (as by Alberti, Stanyhurst, Klopstock, Longfellow, Bridges, and many others), or simply as an ideal of what a nation's heroic verse should aspire to.

== English ==
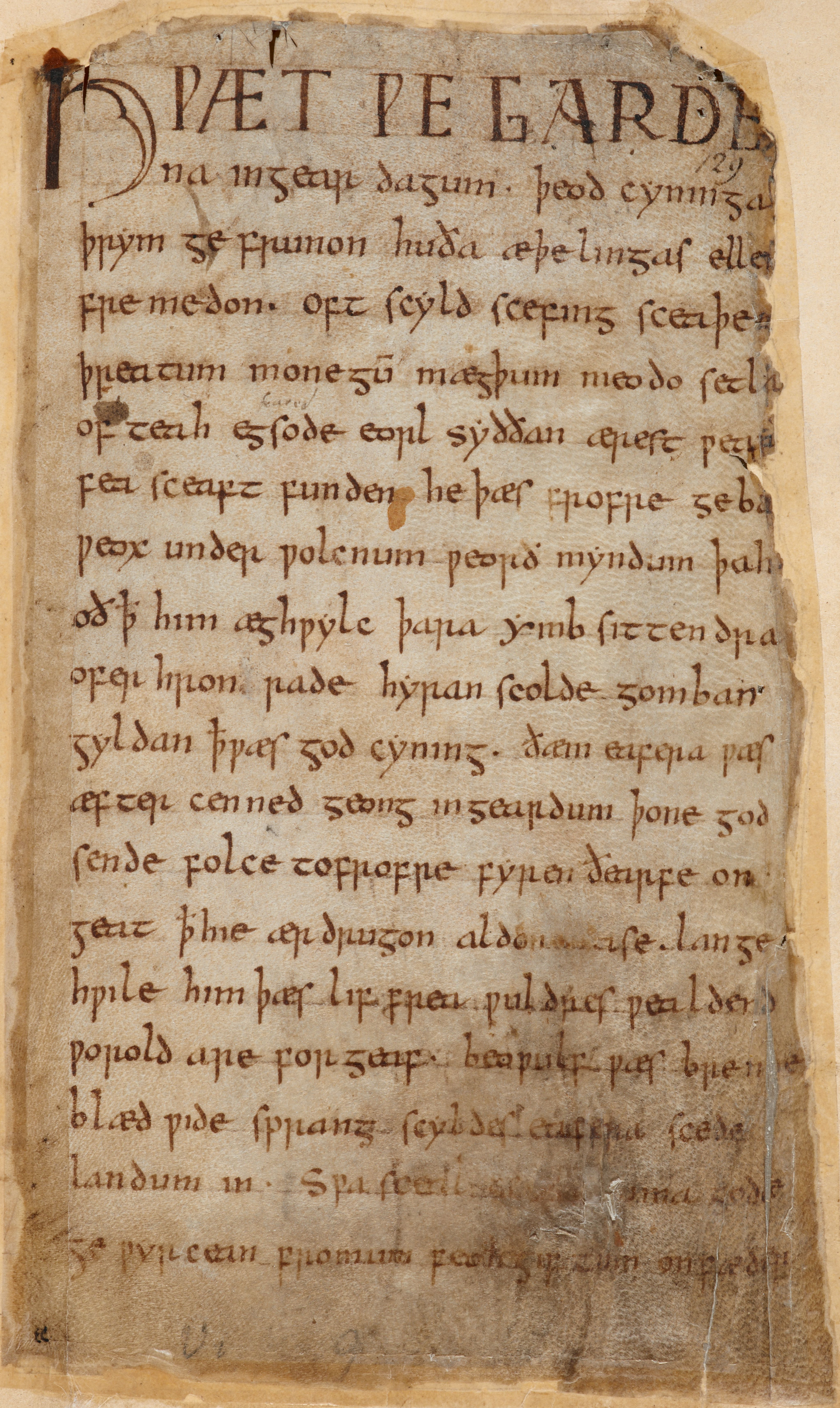
The first page from the sole manuscript copy of Beowulf

Alliterative verse (as exemplified by Beowulf) was the heroic verse of Old English, as, in several closely related forms, it was for all Germanic languages more or less during the first millennium C.E.

Then that sorry soul suffered awhile,
most miserably, he who in murk lingered.
Alone he listened to the delight each day,
human happiness, the hall loud with glee;
sweet was the singing, sound of harping.

— Beowulf: An Imitative Translation, lines 86-90

The Alliterative Revival (mainly of the 14th century) likely constituted a continuation (though in evolved form) of the earlier tradition. However, around 1380 Geoffrey Chaucer developed the English iambic pentameter, based chiefly on the Italian endecasillabo and composed chiefly in couplets or in rime royal. Although Chaucer's practice was largely preserved to the north by the Scottish Chaucerians (James I of Scotland, Robert Henryson, William Dunbar and Gavin Douglas), in England itself changes in pronunciation or taste soon rendered Chaucer's technique extinct, and iambic pentameter disappeared for over 100 years.

The practice in these years has been characterized as incompetent ("bad shambling heroics"), but alternatively as a distinct meter that embraces lines that qualify as well-formed iambic pentameter as well as others that don't. Jakob Schipper for example, laid out a 16-type pattern for "five-accent verse":

(×) / × / (×)  |  (×) / × / × / (×)

where /=accented syllable; ×=unaccented syllable; (×)=optional; and |=caesura

which he then further multiplied by allowing that sometimes the caesura could appear elsewhere (most commonly after the third accent):

(×) / × / × / (×)  |  (×) / × / (×)

C. S. Lewis in fact denominated this verse the "fifteenth-century heroic" while both simplifying and broadening its metrical definition: a line with a sharp medial caesura, each resulting half-line having from 2 to 3 stresses, most hovering between 2 and 3. Lewis exemplifies his conception of the "fifteenth-century heroic line" with this excerpt from The Assembly of Gods:

His shéte from his bódy | dówn he let fáll,
And ón a rèwde máner | he salútyd àll the róut,
Wíth a bóld vòyse | cárpying wórdÿs stóut.
Bút he spáke all hólow, | ás hit hád be óon
Had spóke in anóther wórld | þát had wóo begóon. (Note: Lewis's accents are retained, but always placed on the syllable's initial vowel; his added line divisions are replaced with "|" and the ensuing capitals reduced.)

— Anonymous: Assembly of Gods lines 437-441

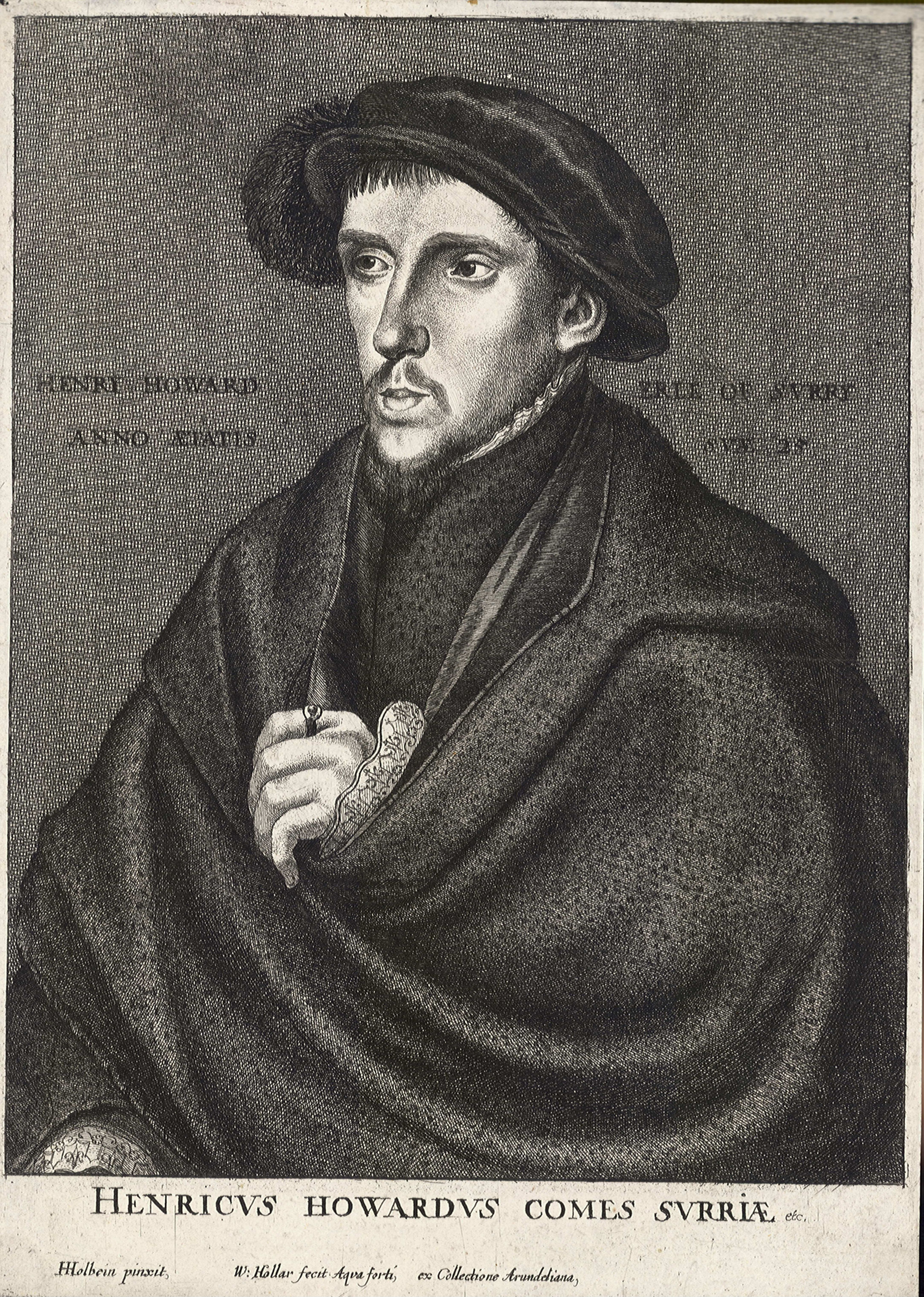
Henry Howard, Earl of Surrey, originator of English blank verse

Iambic pentameter was re-developed by Wyatt and Surrey in the 1530s or 1540s. It was Surrey's line (modeled this time on the French vers de dix) as finessed by Philip Sidney and Edmund Spenser that was re-embraced as English heroic verse. Using this line, Surrey also introduced blank verse into English, previous instances being rimed.

A long exile thou art assigned to bere,
Long to furrow large space of stormy seas;
So shalt thou reach at last Hesperian land,
Wher Lidian Tiber with his gentle streme
Mildly doth flow along the frutfull felds.

— Surrey: Translations from the Æneid Book 2, lines 1035-1039

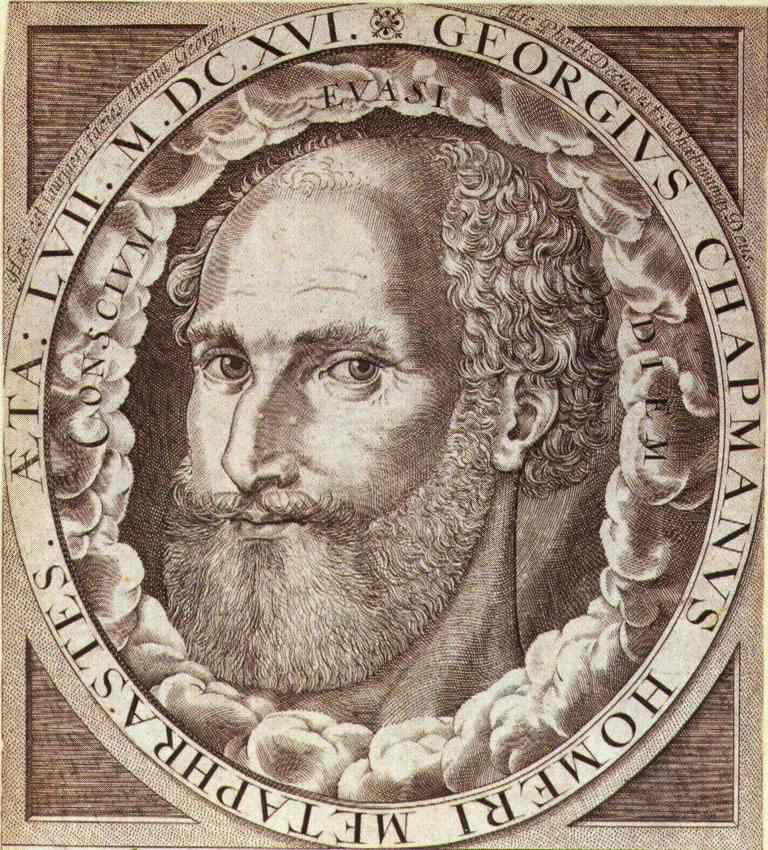
George Chapman, translator of Homer

The fourteener vied with iambic pentameter as the English heroic verse during the mid-16th-century, especially for translation from classical drama and narrative, notably: Jasper Heywood's translations of Seneca (1559-1561), Arthur Golding's translation of Ovid's Metamorphoses (1567), and George Chapman's Iliad (1598-1611).

Achilles' banefull wrath resound, O Goddesse, that imposd
Infinite sorrowes on the Greeks, and many brave soules losd
From breasts Heroique—sent them farre, to that invisible cave
That no light comforts; and their lims to dogs and vultures gave.

— Chapman: Iliad Book 1, lines 1-4

However, landmark works like Gorboduc (1561), portions of The Mirror for Magistrates (1559-1610), Tamburlaine (c. 1587), Astrophel and Stella (1580s, published 1591), and The Faerie Queene (1590-1596), established the iambic pentameter—rimed for narrative and lyric and largely unrimed for drama—as the English heroic line.

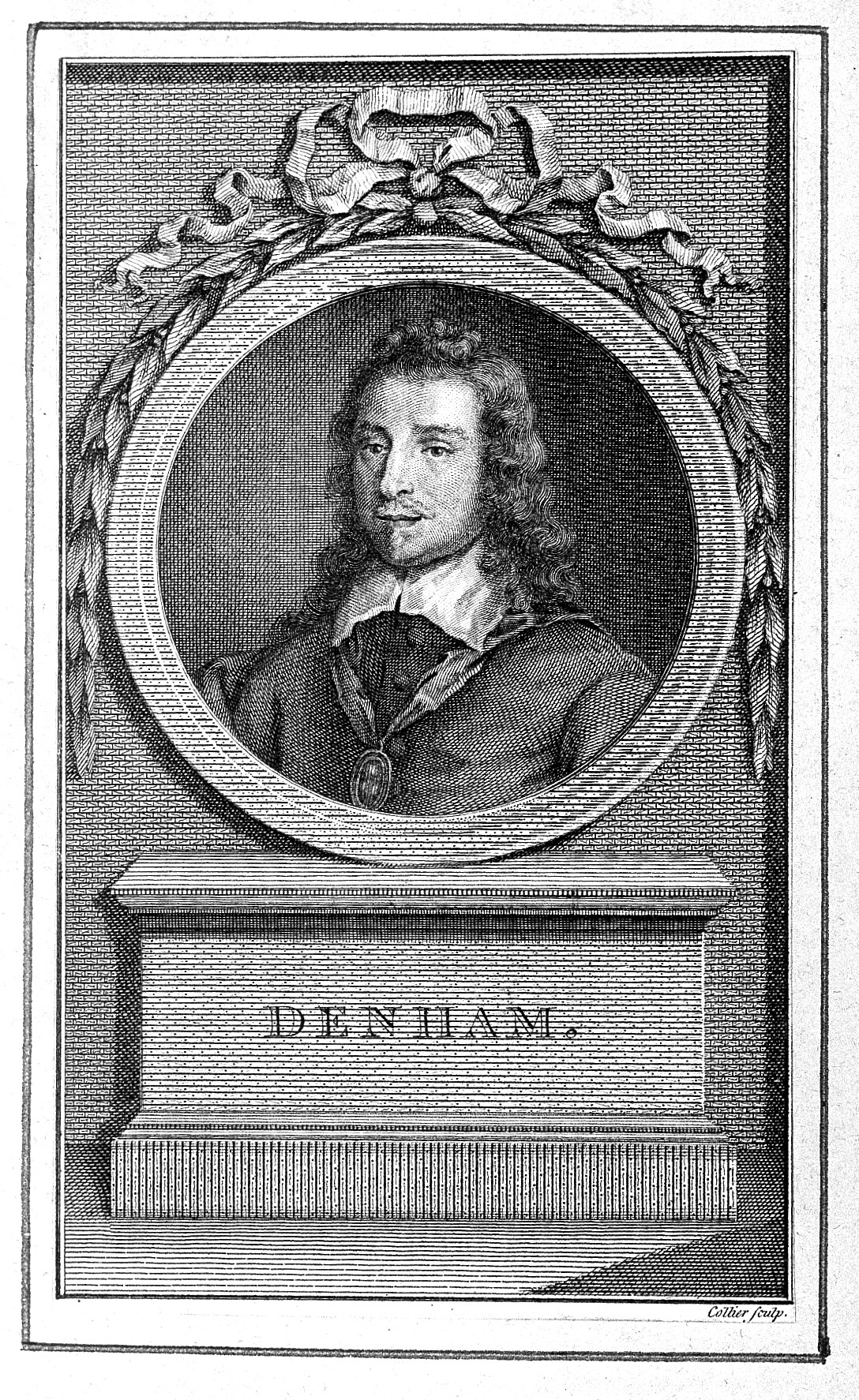
John Denham, influential writer of heroic couplets

The heroic couplet is a pair of iambic pentameter lines that rime together. Frequently, the term is associated with the balanced, closed couplets that dominated English verse from roughly 1640 to 1790, although the form dates back to Chaucer, and remains in use often in a looser form. John Denham exemplifies, and describes (while addressing the River Thames), the neoclassical closed heroic couplet:

Oh, could I flow like thee, and make thy stream
My great example, as it is my theme!
Though deep, yet clear; though gentle, yet not dull;
Strong without rage, without o'erflowing full.

— Denham: Cooper's Hill lines 189-192

The heroic quatrain (also "elegiac quatrain") is a stanza of iambic pentameter riming ABAB.

== French ==
In France the décasyllabe and alexandrine have taken turns as the language's heroic verseform: first, the décasyllabe appearing in the 11th century; then, around 1200 the alexandrine began its first period of dominance; however, by 1400 the décasyllabe had again been established as the French heroic verse, completely ousting the alexandrine. The alexandrine, in a slightly stricter form, was resurrected in the middle of the 16th century by the poets of the Pléiade, and has retained its status since then.

Nous partîmes cinq cents; | mais par un prompt renfort
Nous nous vîmes trois mille | en arrivant au port,
Tant, à nous voir marcher | avec un tel visage,
Les plus épouvantés | reprenaient de courage! (Note: Caesura markings have been added to both French and English texts to clarify the line structure.)

—Corneille: Le Cid Act IV, scene 3, lines 1259-62

As five hundred we left, | but soon we gained support:
To three thousand we grew | as we approached the port.
Thus, seeing us all march | in league and with such favor,
The fear melted away, | the throng becoming braver!

== Sources ==
- Brogan, T.V.F. (1993). "Heroic verse". In Preminger, Alex; Brogan, T.V.F.; et al. (eds.). The New Princeton Encyclopedia of Poetry and Poetics. New York: MJF Books. pp. 524–525. ISBN 1-56731-152-0. OCLC 961668903.
- Chapman, George (1956). Nicoll, Allardyce (ed.). Chapman's Homer. Bolingen Series XLI. Vol. One: The Illiad. New York: Pantheon Books. OCLC 888671582.
- Cole, A. Thomas (1993). "Saturnian". In Preminger, Alex; Brogan, T.V.F.; et al. (eds.). The New Princeton Encyclopedia of Poetry and Poetics. New York: MJF Books. p. 1117. ISBN 1-56731-152-0. OCLC 961668903.
- Corneille, Pierre (1912). Searles, Colbert (ed.). Le Cid. Boston: Ginn and Company.
- Devine, Andrew M.; Stephens, Laurence D.; Brogan, T.V.F.; Costas, Procope S. (1993). "Hexameter". In Preminger, Alex; Brogan, T.V.F.; et al. (eds.). The New Princeton Encyclopedia of Poetry and Poetics. New York: MJF Books. pp. 525–526. ISBN 1-56731-152-0. OCLC 961668903.
- Duffell, Martin J. (2008). A New History of English Metre. Studies in Linguistics. Vol. 5. London: Legenda. ISBN 978-1-907975-13-4. OCLC 751039247.
- Gasparov, M. L. (1996). Smith, G. S.; Holford-Strevens, L. (eds.). A History of European Versification. Translated by Smith, G. S.; Tarlinskaja, Marina. Oxford: Clarendon Press. ISBN 0-19-815879-3. OCLC 1027190450.
- Gilfillan, George, ed. (1857). The Poetical Works Of Edmund Waller And Sir John Denham. Edinburgh: James Nichol. OCLC 1079173537.
- Hamer, Enid (1930). The Metres of English Poetry. London: Methuen. OCLC 655669997.
- Hardison, O.B.; Brogan, T.V.F. (1993). "Fourteener". In Preminger, Alex; Brogan, T.V.F.; et al. (eds.). The New Princeton Encyclopedia of Poetry and Poetics. New York: MJF Books. pp. 424–425. ISBN 1-56731-152-0. OCLC 961668903.
- Kastner, L. E. (1903). A History of French Versification. Oxford: The Clarendon Press. OCLC 494022236.
- Lehmann, Ruth P.M. (1988). Beowulf: An Imitative Translation. Austin: University of Texas Press. ISBN 0292707711. OCLC 246537832.
- Lehmann, Winfred P. (1956). The Development of Germanic Verse Form. Austin: University of Texas Press. OCLC 1069932004.
- Lewis, C.S. (1969) [1939]. "The Fifteenth-Century Heroic Line". Selected Literary Essays. Cambridge: Cambridge University Press. pp. 45–57. OCLC 623321600.
- Padelford, Frederick Morgan, ed. (1928). The Poems of Henry Howard Earl of Surrey (Revised ed.). Seattle: University of Washington Press. OCLC 474929877.
- Piper, William Bowman (1993). "Fourteener". In Preminger, Alex; Brogan, T.V.F.; et al. (eds.). The New Princeton Encyclopedia of Poetry and Poetics. New York: MJF Books. pp. 522–524. ISBN 1-56731-152-0. OCLC 961668903.
- Schipper, Jakob (1910). A History of English Versification. Oxford: The Clarendon Press. OCLC 1031802469.
- Steele, Timothy (1999). All the Fun's in How You Say a Thing. Athens, OH: Ohio University Press. ISBN 0-8214-1260-4. OCLC 490391272.
