= Oliver Goldsmith (Canadian poet) =

Canadian poet

- Born: 1794; St. Andrews, Colony of New Brunswick
- Died: 1861 (aged 66–67); Liverpool, England
- Occupation: poet

Oliver Goldsmith (1794–1861) was a Canadian poet born in St. Andrews, New Brunswick. In 1822, he wrote some verses for an amateur theatre in Halifax. He is best known for The Rising Village, which appeared in 1825. It was at once the first book-length poem published by a native English-Canadian and the first book-length publication in England by a Canadian poet. Furthermore, his Autobiography is the first autobiography of a native Canadian writer. He is not to be confused with his great-uncle Oliver Goldsmith, to whose celebrated poem The Deserted Village The Rising Village is a response.

In 1944, his name was added by the Canadian Government to its list of Persons of National Historic Significance.

== See also ==
- Canadian literature
- Canadian poetry
- List of Canadian poets
