= The Traveller (poem) =

1764 poem by Oliver Goldsmith

- by Oliver Goldsmith
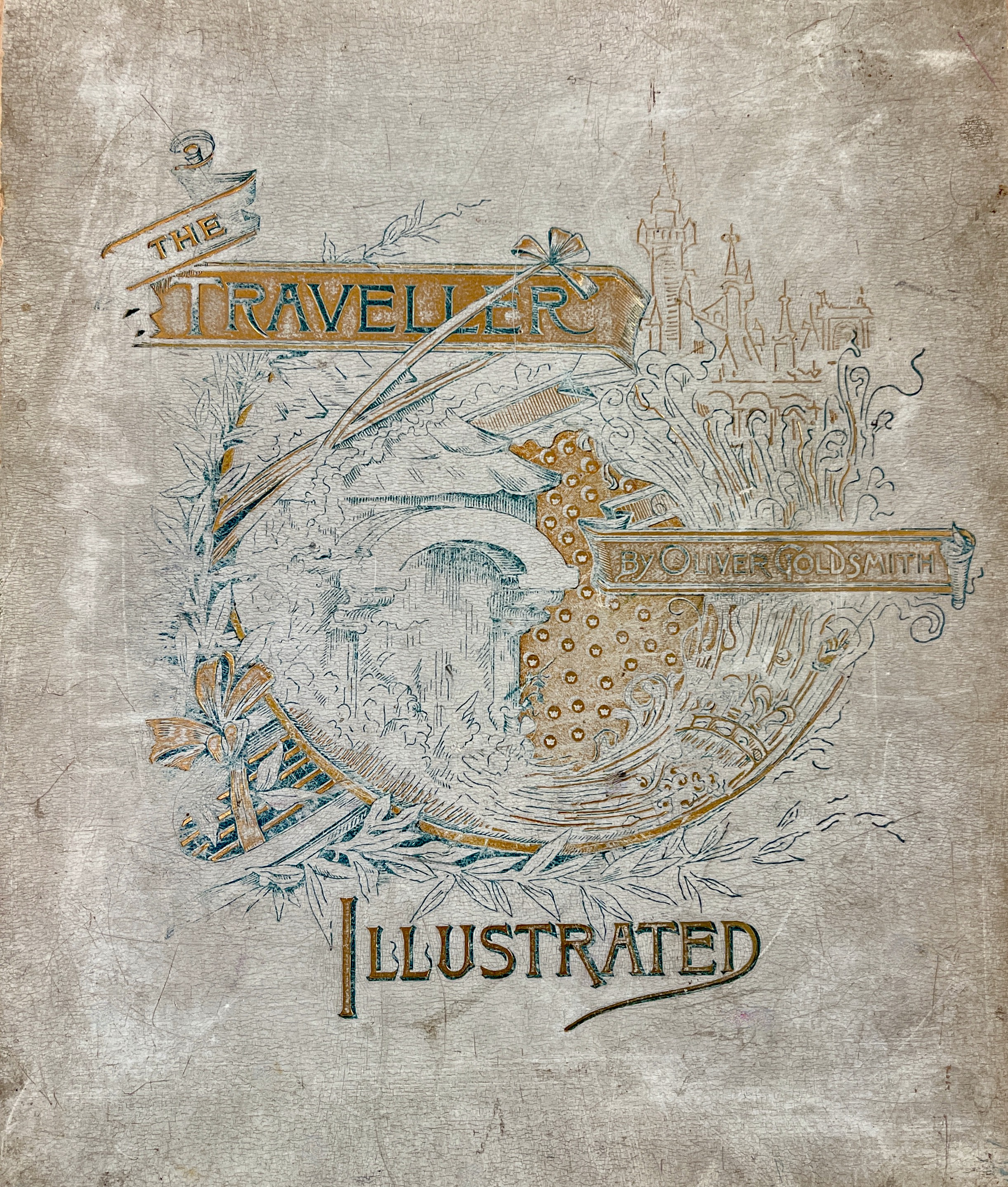
- The Traveller book cover
- Publisher: John Newbery
- Publication date: 1764

The Traveller; or, a Prospect of Society (1764) is a philosophical poem by novelist Oliver Goldsmith. In heroic verse of an Augustan style it discusses the causes of happiness and unhappiness in nations. It was the work which first made Goldsmith's name, and is still considered a classic of mid-18th-century poetry.

== Synopsis ==
The dedication to The Traveller sets out Goldsmith's purpose:

I have endeavoured to shew, that there may be equal happiness in states, that are differently governed from our own; that every state has a particular principle of happiness, and that this principle in each may be carried to a mischievous excess.

He begins the poem by extolling the happiness of his brother Henry's simple family life. Then, from a vantage-point in the Alps, he surveys the condition of the world. "Every nation, he says, considers itself the happiest, but this is only because each nation judges by its own standards." In fact, happiness is probably equally spread, though in different forms which tend to be mutually exclusive.

From art more various are the blessings sent,—
Wealth, commerce, honour, liberty, content.
Yet these each other's power so strong contest,
That either seems destructive of the rest.
Where wealth and freedom reign, contentment fails,
And honour sinks where commerce long prevails.

— Lines 87-92

Then Goldsmith turns to consider various countries individually. He argues that Italy is naturally fertile and was formerly successful in commerce, but has since been overtaken by other countries. He further states that the remaining great works of art and architecture only inspire a childish love of show in the Italians. The Swiss, according to Goldsmith, have poverty, but also equality. They love home-life and simple things, he says, but have no nobility of soul. He believes France is a nation motivated by honour, and is therefore too prone to vanity, whereas in Holland industry has brought prosperity, but

Even liberty itself is barter'd here:
At gold's superior charms all freedom flies,
The needy sell it, and the rich man buys.

— Lines 306-308

Britain's free constitution has led to a lack of social cohesion, the rich defending their own liberties by oppressing the poor. Those who have escaped this problem by fleeing across the Atlantic have found a harsh and dangerous land in America. The poem concludes with the thought that happiness lies within:

How small, of all that human hearts endure,
That part which laws or kings can cause or cure!
Still to ourselves in every place consign'd,
Our own felicity we make or find:

— Lines 429-432

== Composition ==
Goldsmith began writing The Traveller in 1755 while he was travelling in Switzerland. His travels in Europe in that and the following year gave him much material to draw on, but he seems to have let the poem drop. He resumed it in 1763, by which time he was living at Canonbury House in Islington, and completed it in 1764. Most of the last few lines of the poem was contributed by Goldsmith's friend Dr. Johnson. Goldsmith chose not to dedicate The Traveller to some powerful or wealthy patron, as was the normal practice of the time, but to his brother Henry, the ill-paid curate of an Irish parish.

== Publication ==
The Traveller was first published on 19 December 1764 by John Newbery, though the year was given on the imprint as 1765. It was the first of Goldsmith's books to feature his name on the title-page. Goldsmith received only £21 for The Traveller, but the publisher must have made a good deal more, since a second edition appeared in March 1765, a fourth in August 1765 (only eight months after the first), and a ninth before Goldsmith's death in 1774. The author continued to revise the poem for the rest of his life, so that the ninth edition contained 36 new lines not in the first.

== Sources ==
The style of The Traveller stands in the tradition of verse in heroic couplets that had dominated English poetry for the previous hundred years. In particular, it owes a debt to Dryden and Pope, to whose poems it has often been favourably compared.

From an early date much attention has been paid to Goldsmith’s sources for the plan and subject-matter of the poem. Many who knew Goldsmith personally, having no great opinion of his abilities, believed that The Traveller owed much to the conversation of Dr. Johnson, as may well be the case, or even that Johnson had written a substantial part of it for him. Joseph Addison's Letters from Italy has a rather similar theme, insofar as it is a piece of travel-writing describing the Italian landscape and character in verse. Other names that have been mentioned include Richard Blackmore's The Nature of Man, James Thomson's Liberty, and Thomas Gray's fragment on "The Alliance of Education and Government". There are also one or two verbal resemblances to Samuel Garth's "Claremont" and Matthew Prior's "Written at Paris in the Beginning of Robe's Geography". More recent research has shown that the philosophy of The Traveller owes much to Buffon's Histoire naturelle and Montesquieu's Esprit des lois.

== Critical reception ==
The Traveller was the poem which made Goldsmith's reputation. Dr. Johnson, so Boswell reports, said that "there had not been so fine a poem since Pope's time", and he went on to write a brief but laudatory article on it in the Critical Review. Two months after publication the St. James's Chronicle praised "the beauties of this poem" as "great and various", and this opinion was seconded by the Gentleman's Magazine and in large measure by the Monthly Review, though the Monthly’s reviewer also took Goldsmith to task for his Tory suspicion of commerce. Readers of all ages soon began to discover The Traveller’s merits. The 17-year-old Charles James Fox admired the poem; a few years later the even younger William Wordsworth read The Traveller, and was influenced by it when he wrote his earliest surviving poem, "Lines Written as a School Exercise". The poem's critical reception continued high, though it often suffered by comparison with his The Deserted Village. The bibliographer Egerton Brydges preferred The Traveller:

The sentiments are always interesting, generally just, and often new; the imagery is elegant, picturesque, and occasionally sublime; the language is nervous, highly finished, and full of harmony.

But many followed the poets Thomas Campbell and Leigh Hunt in rating The Deserted Village higher. Campbell said The Traveller’s field of contemplation was rather desultory, while Hunt complained that some feeble lines gave it the air of having been interpolated. The publisher Henry Bohn claimed that The Traveller "combines the highest beauties of ethic and descriptive poetry." Lord Macaulay's opinion was that

In general [Goldsmith's] designs were bad, and his execution good. In The Traveller, the execution, though deserving of much praise, is far inferior to the design. No philosophical poem, ancient or modern, has a plan so noble, and at the same time so simple.

The novelist William Black, on the other hand, while highly praising the poem's mellifluous qualities, admitted that "the literary charm of The Traveller is more apparent than the value of any doctrine, however profound or ingenious, which the poem was supposed to inculcate". More recent academic criticism continues to assert the poem's claims to respectful attention. Arthur Humphreys considered it "a true and thoughtful poem"; Boris Ford noted "the judicious tone, the unruffled movement, the urbane and fluent control of the couplet", which "established him as a great Augustan poet"; and Angus Ross thought that The Traveller proved him a poet with an individual voice, citing particularly its "genuine and deep note of feeling".
