= Jakob Schipper =

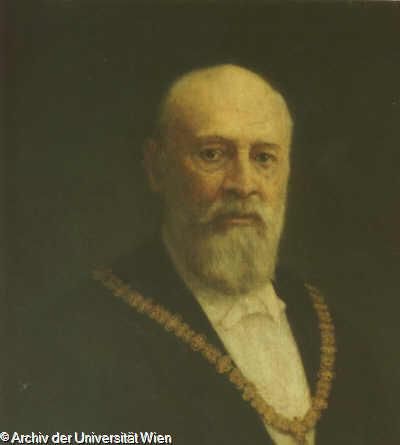
- Jakob Schipper, by Christian Griepenkerl in 1919
- Born: 19 July 1842
- Died: 20 January 1915 (aged 72); Vienna

Jakob Markus Schipper (19 July 1842 Friedrich-Augustengroden (today part of Wangerland) - 20 January 1915 Vienna) was a German-Austrian philologist and English scholar (German: Professor für Anglistik).

== Biography ==
He was the son of a farmer. He studied modern languages in Bonn, Paris, Rome, and Oxford, collaborated on the revision of Bosworth's Anglo-Saxon Dictionary, and was professor of English philology at Königsberg from 1872 until 1877, when he received a like position in Vienna. There he was elected to the Academy of Sciences in 1887. He was rector of the University of Vienna 1901–02, and retired in 1913.

He received the honorary degree Doctor of Letters (D.Litt.) from the University of Oxford in October 1902, in connection with the tercentenary of the Bodleian Library.

== Works ==
In addition to his work with Bosworth, he acted as editor of the Wiener Beiträge zur englischen Philologie (Vienna contributions to English philology; 1895–1900). He also published Englische Metrik (1881–88), an important work, abridged as the one-volume Grundriss der englischen Metrik (1895) (which was in turn published in English as A History of English Versification (1910)); Zur Kritik der Shakespeare-Bacon-Frage (1889), and Der Bacon-Bacillus (1896), and editions of the Alexis legends (1877–87), of Dunbar's poems (1892–94), and of the version of Bede's ecclesiastical history purported to be by Alfred the Great (1897–99). He promoted the study of English at Austrian middle schools.
