= Heroic couplet =

Rhyming pair of lines in iambic pentameter

A heroic couplet is a traditional form for English poetry, commonly used in epic and narrative poetry, and consisting of a rhyming pair of lines in iambic pentameter. Use of the heroic couplet was pioneered by Geoffrey Chaucer in the Legend of Good Women and the Canterbury Tales, and generally considered to have been perfected by John Dryden and Alexander Pope in the Restoration Age and early 18th century respectively.

== Example ==
A frequently-cited example illustrating the use of heroic couplets is this passage from Cooper's Hill by John Denham, part of his description of the Thames:

O could I flow like thee, and make thy stream
My great example, as it is my theme!
Though deep yet clear, though gentle yet not dull;
Strong without rage, without o'erflowing full.

== History ==
The term "heroic couplet" is sometimes reserved for couplets that are largely closed and self-contained, as opposed to the enjambed couplets of poets like John Donne. The heroic couplet is often identified with the English Baroque works of John Dryden and Alexander Pope, who used the form for their translations of the epics of Virgil and Homer, respectively. Major poems in the closed couplet, apart from the works of Dryden and Pope, are Samuel Johnson's The Vanity of Human Wishes, Oliver Goldsmith's The Deserted Village, and John Keats's Lamia. The form was immensely popular in the 18th century. The looser type of couplet, with occasional enjambment, was one of the standard verse forms in medieval narrative poetry, largely because of the influence of the Canterbury Tales.

== Variations ==
English heroic couplets, especially in Dryden and his followers, are sometimes varied by the use of the occasional alexandrine, or hexameter line, and triplet. Often these two variations are used together to heighten a climax. The breaking of the regular pattern of rhyming pentameter pairs brings about a sense of poetic closure. Here are two examples from Book IV of Dryden's translation of the Aeneid.

=== Alexandrine ===
Her lofty courser, in the court below,
Who his majestic rider seems to know,
Proud of his purple trappings, paws the ground,
And champs the golden bit, and spreads the foam around.

— (ll. 190–193)

=== Alexandrine and Triplet ===
My Tyrians, at their injur’d queen’s command,
Had toss’d their fires amid the Trojan band;
At once extinguish’d all the faithless name;
And I myself, in vengeance of my shame,
Had fall’n upon the pile, to mend the fun’ral flame.

— (ll. 867–871)

== Modern use ==
Twentieth-century authors have occasionally made use of the heroic couplet, often as an allusion to the works of poets of previous centuries. An example of this is Vladimir Nabokov's novel Pale Fire, the second section of which is a 999-line, 4-canto poem largely written in loose heroic couplets with frequent enjambment. Here is an example from the first canto:

And then black night. That blackness was sublime.
I felt distributed through space and time:
One foot upon a mountaintop. One hand
Under the pebbles of a panting strand,
One ear in Italy, one eye in Spain,
In caves, my blood, and in the stars, my brain.

— (Canto One. 147–153)

The use of heroic couplets in translations of Greco-Roman epics has also inspired translations of non-Western works into English. In 2021, Vietnamese translator Nguyen Binh published a translation of the Vietnamese epic poem Tale of Kiều, in which the lục bát couplets of the original were rendered into heroic couplets. Binh named John Dryden and Alexander Pope as major influences on their work, which also mimicked the spelling of Dryden and Pope's translations to evoke the medieval air of the Vietnamese original. An example of the heroic couplet translation can be found below:

One mounted, one released the other’s coat,
The autumn maples dyed with roads remote.
Red miles cast dust upon the faring steed;
He disappear’d behind the berry mead.
One stay’d as shadow through the hours of night,
One left alone for great miles out of sight.
Who had cut up the rounded moon in two,
Half shining cushions, half on miles that grew?

— (VI. 1519-1526)

== See also ==
- Metre (poetry)
- Iambic pentameter
- Foot (prosody)
- Heroic verse
