= Star Wars prequel trilogy =

Second film trilogy in the Star Wars franchise

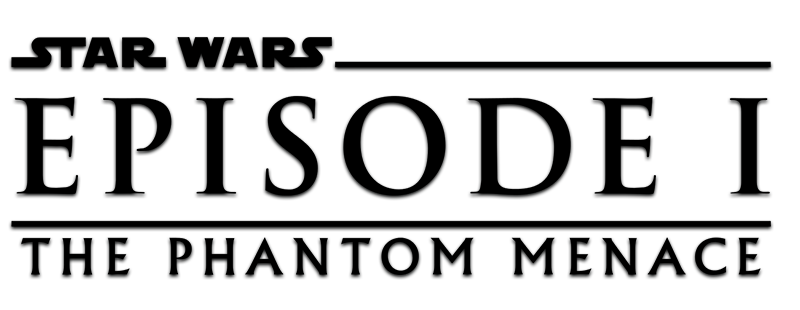
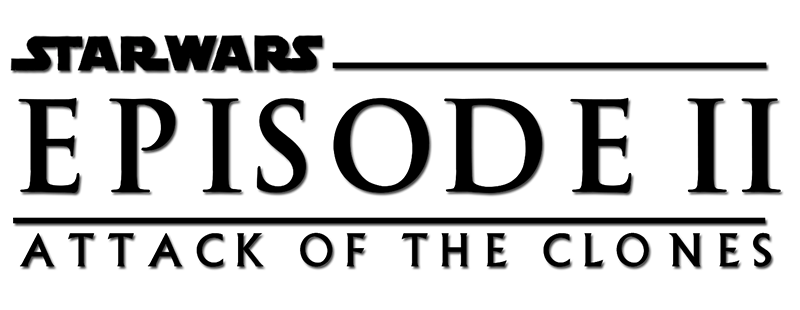
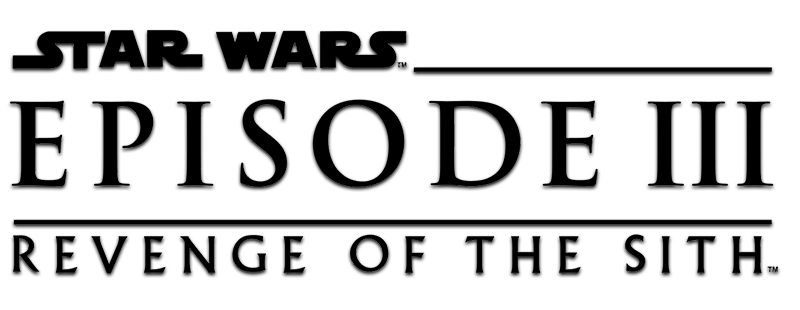
- The Star Wars prequel trilogy logos
- Directed by: George Lucas
- Screenplay by: George Lucas; Jonathan Hales (II)
- Story by: George Lucas
- Produced by: Rick McCallum
- Starring: Liam Neeson (I); Ewan McGregor; Natalie Portman; Jake Lloyd (I); Ian McDiarmid; Anthony Daniels; Kenny Baker; Ahmed Best; Pernilla August (I–II); Frank Oz; Hayden Christensen (II–III); Samuel L. Jackson; Christopher Lee (II–III)
- Cinematography: David Tattersall
- Edited by: Ben Burtt; Paul Martin Smith (I); Roger Barton (III)
- Music by: John Williams
- Production company: Lucasfilm Ltd.
- Distributed by: 1999–2019: 20th Century Fox; Since 2019: Walt Disney Studios Motion Pictures (Note: Physical distribution rights were set to move to Disney in 2020 according to the 2012 deal, but eventually moved to Disney in 2019 as a result of the acquisition of Fox. Theatrical re-releases are still distributed under the 20th Century Studios label.)
- Release date: 1999–2005
- Country: United States
- Language: English
- Budget: $343 million (total for I–III)
- Box office: $2.526 billion (total for I–III)

The Star Wars prequel trilogy, colloquially referred to as the prequels, is a series of epic space-opera films written and directed by George Lucas. It was produced by Lucasfilm Ltd. and distributed by 20th Century Fox. The trilogy was released from 1999 to 2005 and is set before the original Star Wars trilogy (1977–1983), chronologically making it the first act of the Skywalker Saga. Lucas had planned a prequel trilogy (as well as a sequel trilogy) before the release of the original film, but halted major Star Wars films beyond the original trilogy by 1983. When computer-generated imagery (CGI) had advanced to the level he wanted for the visual effects he wanted for subsequent films, Lucas revived plans for the prequels by the early 1990s. The trilogy marked Lucas's return to directing after the 22-year hiatus following the original Star Wars film in 1977, as well as a 16-year hiatus between the classic and prequel trilogies.

The trilogy consists of Episode I – The Phantom Menace (1999), Episode II – Attack of the Clones (2002), and Episode III – Revenge of the Sith (2005). The films follow the training of the powerful youth Anakin Skywalker as a Jedi under the tutelage of Jedi Masters Qui-Gon Jinn, (Note: In Episode I – The Phantom Menace (1999)) Obi-Wan Kenobi (Note: In Episode II – Attack of the Clones (2002) and Episode III: Revenge of the Sith (2005)) and Yoda, (Note: In Episode II – Attack of the Clones (2002) and Episode III: Revenge of the Sith (2005)) his fall to the dark side of the Force and rebirth as Darth Vader. The trilogy also depicts the corruption of the Galactic Republic, the genocide of the Jedi Order, and the rise of the Empire under Palpatine (secretly the Sith Lord Darth Sidious). The first two films received mixed reviews, while the third's reception was more positive. All three enjoyed box-office success.

== Background ==
It's all based on backstories that I'd written setting up what the Jedi were, setting up what the Sith were, setting up what the Empire was, setting up what the Republic was, and how it all fits together. I spent a lot of time in developing those elements, and what each planet did, and why they did it the way they did. So I had all this material. A lot of the story elements were given. Early on, it was that Anakin had been more or less created by the midi-chlorians, and that the midi-chlorians had a very powerful relationship to the Whills [from the first draft of Star Wars], and the power of the Whills, and all that. I never really got a chance to explain the Whills part.

So a lot of the story of the prequels, I'd done already. And now I was just having to put it into a script and fill it in, kind of sew up some of the gaps that were in there. I'd already established that all Jedi had a mentor, with Obi-Wan and Luke, and the fact that that was a bigger issue – that's the way the Jedi actually worked. But it was also the way that the Sith worked. There's always the Sith Lord and then the apprentice.

Everybody said, "Oh, well, there was a war between the Jedi and the Sith." Well, that never happened. That's just made up by fans or somebody. What really happened is, the Sith ruled the universe for a while, 2,000 years ago. Each Sith has an apprentice, but the problem was, that each Sith Lord got to be powerful. And the Sith Lords would try to kill each other because they all wanted to be the most powerful. So in the end they killed each other off, and there wasn't anything left. So the idea is that when you have a Sith Lord, and he has an apprentice, the apprentice is always trying to recruit somebody to join him – because he's not strong enough, usually – so that he can kill his master.

— Filmmaker George Lucas describing the concepts and plot of the prequels in a StarWars.com interview.

According to the Star Wars original trilogy producer Gary Kurtz, loose plans for a Star Wars prequel trilogy were developed during the outlining of the original Star Wars film and The Empire Strikes Back. In 1980, Lucas confirmed that he had the nine-film series plotted, but due to the stress of producing the original trilogy and pressure from his wife Marcia Lucas to settle down, he had decided to cancel further sequels by 1981, concluding the saga with Return of the Jedi. However, technical advances in the late 1980s and early 1990s, including the ability to create computer-generated imagery (CGI), inspired Lucas to consider that it might be possible to revisit his saga. In 1989, Lucas stated that the prequel trilogy would be "unbelievably expensive." After viewing an early CGI test created by Industrial Light & Magic for Jurassic Park, Lucas said:

We did a test for Steven Spielberg, and when we put them up on the screen I had tears in my eyes. It was like one of those moments in history, like the invention of the lightbulb or the first telephone call. A major gap had been crossed and things were never going to be the same.

In 1992, Lucas acknowledged that he had plans to create the prequel trilogy in the Lucasfilm Fan Club magazine, and announced this to Variety in late 1993. Producer Rick McCallum reached out to Frank Darabont, who had previously written The Young Indiana Jones Chronicles and The Shawshank Redemption, for possible future writing duties. He was considered until at least 1995, but as time went on, Lucas continued writing the screenplays himself. Jeffrey Boam, who had previously written Indiana Jones and the Last Crusade for Lucas, was interested in 1995 to rewrite and polish Lucas' scripts for the prequels. Before Lucas chose to direct the prequels, Return of the Jedi director Richard Marquand expressed interest in directing one of the prequel films, up until his death in 1987. The popularity of the franchise had been prolonged by the Star Wars Expanded Universe, so that it still had a large audience. A theatrical rerelease of the original trilogy in 1997 'updated' the 20-year-old films with the style of CGI envisioned for the new episodes.

== Films ==
Having been significantly anticipated by fans, Star Wars: Episode I – The Phantom Menace was released on May 19, 1999. It sees the Jedi coming into contact with the young Anakin Skywalker and the corruption of the Galactic Senate by Darth Sidious. Episode II – Attack of the Clones was released on May 16, 2002. The story jumps ahead 10 years and finds Anakin—now a Jedi apprentice of Obi-Wan Kenobi—pursuing a forbidden romance, as well as the outbreak of the Clone Wars. Episode III – Revenge of the Sith, the first PG-13 film in the franchise, was released on May 19, 2005. It picks up three years following Attack of the Clones and depicts the Jedi Order being annihilated via Order 66, the Galactic Republic coming to an end and the Galactic Empire forming in its place and Anakin falling to the dark side of the Force and being reborn as Darth Vader, all under the machinations of Palpatine.

Film	Release date	Director	Screenwriter(s)	Story by	Producer	Distributor
Star Wars: Episode I – The Phantom Menace	May 19, 1999	George Lucas	George Lucas	George Lucas	Rick McCallum	20th Century Fox (initial); Walt Disney Studios Motion Pictures
Star Wars: Episode II – Attack of the Clones	May 16, 2002	George Lucas	George Lucas and Jonathan Hales	George Lucas	Rick McCallum	20th Century Fox (initial); Walt Disney Studios Motion Pictures
Star Wars: Episode III – Revenge of the Sith	May 19, 2005	George Lucas	George Lucas	George Lucas	Rick McCallum	20th Century Fox (initial); Walt Disney Studios Motion Pictures

=== Episode I – The Phantom Menace ===
32 years before the events of the original film, (13 years before the creation of the Galactic Empire), two Jedi Knights—Qui-Gon Jinn and his apprentice Obi-Wan Kenobi—are sent to negotiate with the corrupt Trade Federation who has formed a blockade around the planet Naboo. Naboo's senator Palpatine—who is secretly the Sith Lord Darth Sidious—has covertly engineered the blockade as a pretext to become Supreme Chancellor of the Galactic Republic. With the help of Naboo's fourteen-year-old queen, Padmé Amidala, and accompanied by a clumsy native named Jar Jar Binks, Qui-Gon and Obi-Wan escape the blockade. They land on Tatooine to repair their starship and meet a nine-year-old slave named Anakin Skywalker. Believing him to be the prophesied "Chosen One", Qui-Gon takes Anakin to be trained as a Jedi.

The prequels were originally planned to fill in history tangential to the original trilogy, but Lucas realized that they could form the first half of one long story focusing on Anakin. This would shape the film series into a self-contained saga. In 1994, Lucas began writing the screenplay for the first prequel, initially titled Episode I: The Beginning. Following the film's release, Lucas announced that he would be directing the next two.

=== Episode II – Attack of the Clones ===
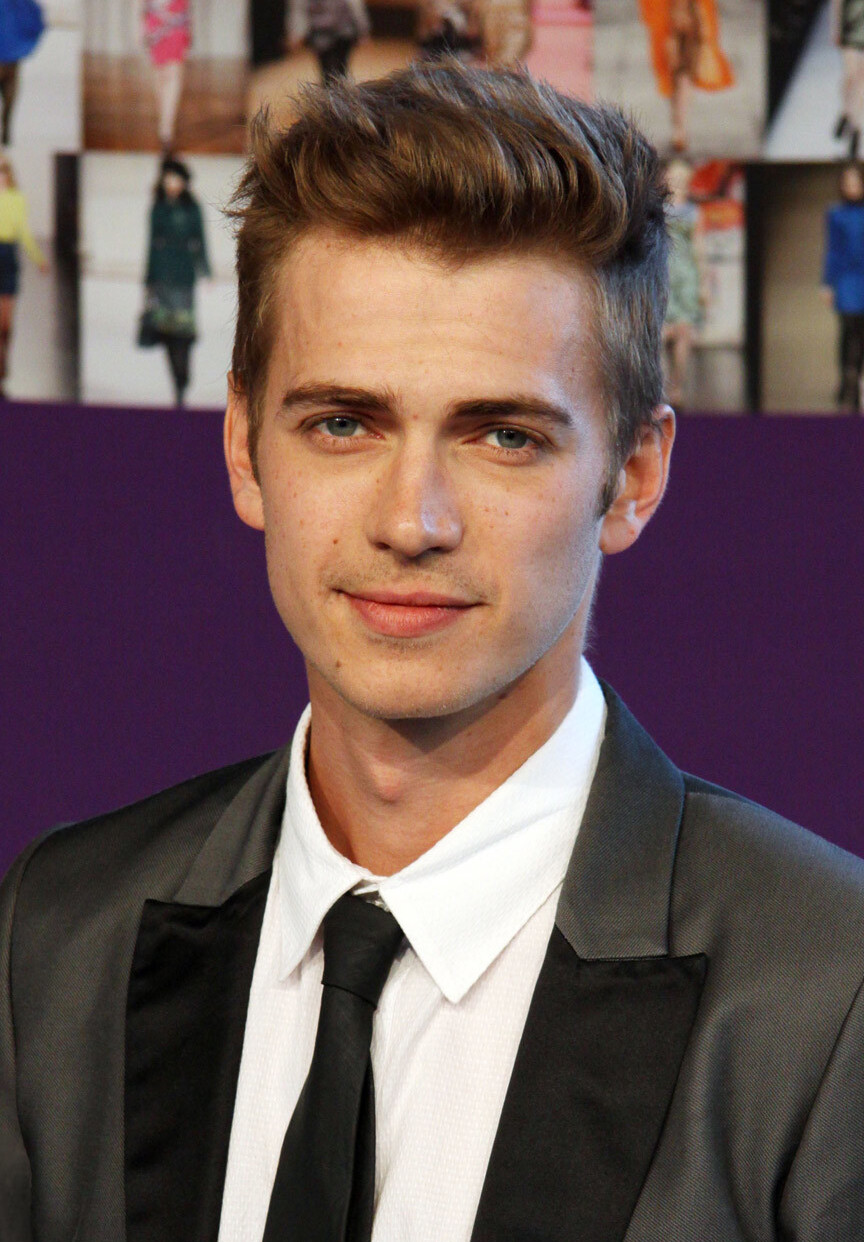
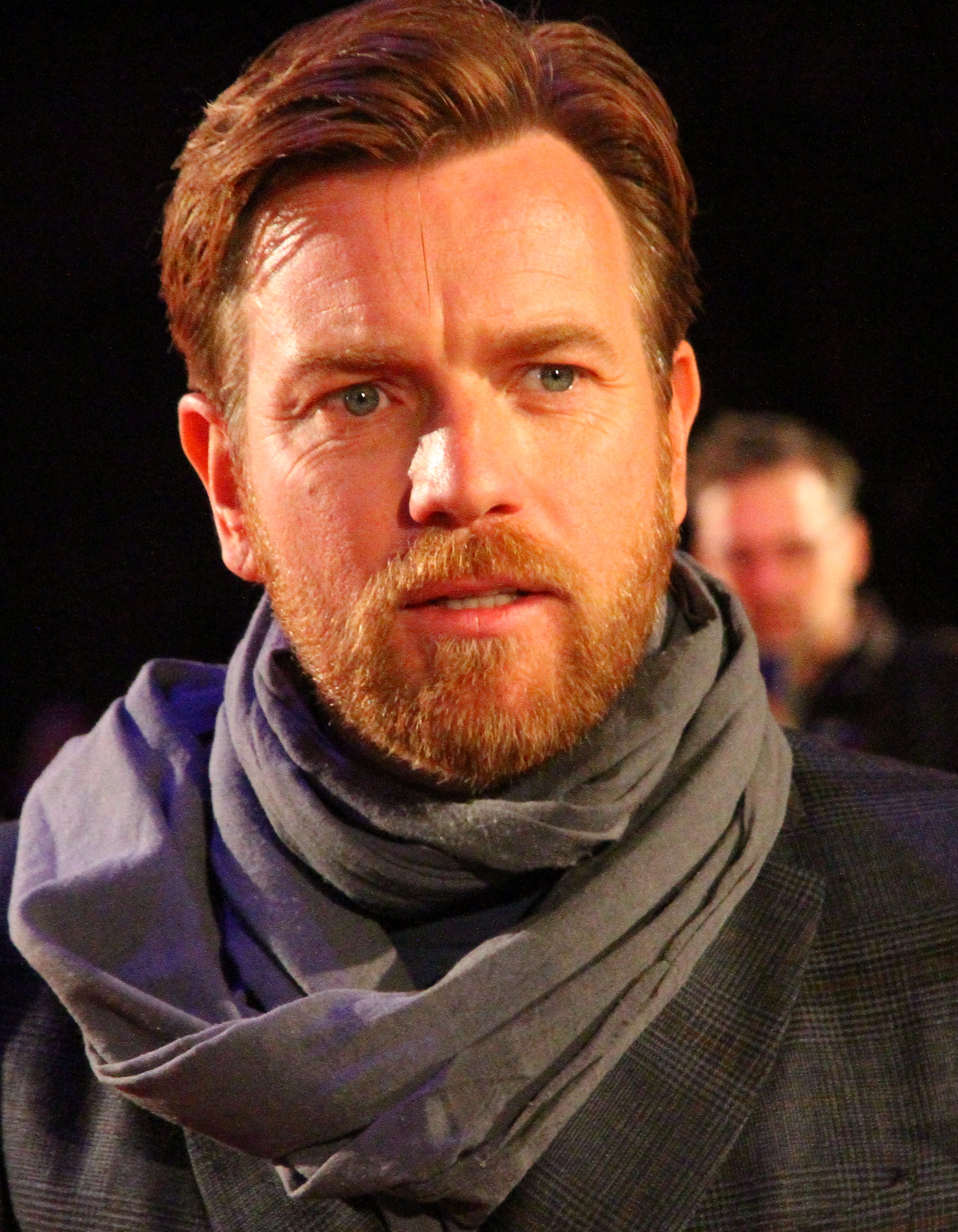
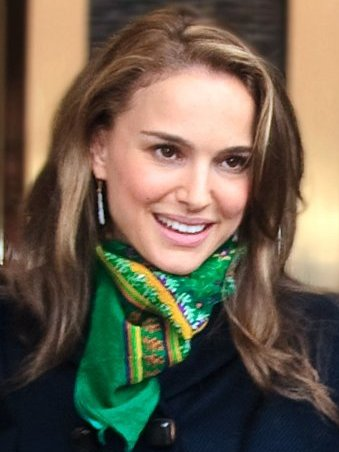
The central trio of the prequel trilogy was played by Hayden Christensen (Anakin Skywalker, Episodes II & III), Ewan McGregor (Obi-Wan Kenobi), and Natalie Portman (Padmé Amidala), respectively.

10 years later, an assassination attempt is made on Padmé Amidala, who is now serving as Naboo's senator after finishing her term as queen. Jedi Knight Obi-Wan Kenobi and his apprentice, Anakin, are assigned to protect her; Obi-Wan tracks the assassin, while Anakin and Padmé secretly fall in love. Meanwhile, Chancellor Palpatine schemes to draw the galaxy into the Clone Wars between the Republic army of clone troopers led by the Jedi, and the Confederacy of Independent Systems led by Darth Sidious' Sith apprentice, Count Dooku.

The first draft of Episode II was completed just weeks before principal photography, and Lucas hired Jonathan Hales, a writer from The Young Indiana Jones Chronicles, to polish it. Unsure of a title, Lucas had jokingly called the film "Jar Jar's Great Adventure". In writing The Empire Strikes Back, Lucas initially considered that Lando Calrissian was a clone from a planet of clones which caused the Clone Wars mentioned in A New Hope. He later came up with the concept of an army of clone shock troopers from a remote planet which attacked the Republic and was resisted by the Jedi.

=== Episode III – Revenge of the Sith ===
Three years into the Clone Wars, Anakin becomes disillusioned with the Jedi Council and begins to have visions of Padmé dying in childbirth. Palpatine reveals himself as Darth Sidious and convinces Anakin that the dark side of the Force holds the power to save Padmé's life. Desperate, Anakin submits to Sidious and assumes the Sith moniker Darth Vader. Sidious then orders the Jedi's extermination while declaring the former Republic an Empire. Vader engages in a lightsaber duel with Obi-Wan on the volcanic planet Mustafar which results in Vader becoming disfigured; losing both legs and left arm, while Padmé dies after giving birth to twins.

Work on Episode III began before Episode II was released, with one scene shot during the earlier film's production. Lucas originally told concept artists that the film would open with a montage of the Clone Wars, and included a scene of Palpatine revealing to Anakin that he had willed his conception through the Force. Lucas reviewed and radically reorganized the plot, having Anakin execute Dooku in the first act to foreshadow his fall to the dark side. After principal photography was completed in 2003, Lucas made more changes, rewriting Anakin's arc. He would now primarily turn to the dark side in a quest to save Padmé, rather than just believing that the Jedi are plotting to take over the Republic. The rewrite was accomplished both through editing principal footage and filming new and revised scenes during pick-ups in 2004.

== Themes ==
=== References ===
Lucas made a conscious effort to parallel scenes and dialogue between the prequel and original trilogy, especially concerning the journey of Anakin Skywalker in the prequels and that of his son Luke in the older films. Together with the original trilogy, Lucas has collectively referred to the first six episodic films of the franchise as "the tragedy of Darth Vader". According to Lucas, the correct order to watch the films is by episode order.

There are many references to Christianity in the prequel trilogy, such as the appearance of Darth Maul, whose design draws heavily from traditional depictions of the devil, complete with red skin and horns. The Star Wars film cycle features a similar Christian narrative involving Anakin Skywalker; he is the "Chosen One"—the individual prophesied to bring balance to the Force—who was conceived of a virgin birth. However, unlike Jesus, Anakin falls from grace and seemingly fails to fulfill his destiny (until the prophecy comes true in Return of the Jedi). The saga draws heavily from the hero's journey, an archetypical template developed by comparative mythologist Joseph Campbell.

Political science has been an important element of Star Wars since the franchise launched in 1977, focusing on a struggle between democracy and dictatorship. Palpatine being a chancellor before becoming the Emperor in the prequel trilogy alludes to Adolf Hitler's role as chancellor before appointing himself Führer. Lucas has also drawn parallels between Palpatine and historical dictators such as Julius Caesar and Napoleon Bonaparte, as well as former president of the United States Richard Nixon. (Note: In his early drafts, Lucas used the plot point of a dictator staying in power with the support of the military. In his comment (made in the prequel trilogy era) Lucas attributed this to Nixon's supposed intention to defy the 22nd Amendment, but Nixon chose to resign after the Watergate scandal and never ran for a third term. Fellow Republican President Ronald Reagan sought to repeal the amendment after leaving the office.) The Great Jedi Purge depicted in Revenge of the Sith mirrors the events of the Night of the Long Knives. The corruption of the Galactic Republic is modeled after the fall of the Roman Republic and the formation of an empire.

=== Dramatic irony and parallels ===
Long term members of the audience who had seen the original trilogy knew many things the protagonists did not know; most significantly the seemingly benign Palpatine's true identity as the phantom menace, Darth Sidious manipulating events and using people to help him accomplish his goals of galactic domination. So there is much dramatic irony throughout the prequel trilogy. During the end credits of The Phantom Menace, Anakin's theme ends with The Imperial March theme and Darth Vader's breathing. This reminds the audience that Anakin's portrayal as an innocent boy does not change what follows; his inevitable transformation into the Sith Lord, the audience knows from the original trilogy. Prior to the film's release, the 1998 teaser poster showing Anakin cast Vader's shadow behind him echoes this.

Each victory for the heroes does very little to nothing to stop Sidious from achieving his objectives. When the Jedi and heroes find out what the audience knows it is too late. The Battle of Naboo and the Clone Wars have been further steps forward in Sidious' plans to take control of the galaxy. After Qui-Gon Jinn and Shmi Skywalker's deaths, Anakin seeks out a new parental figure. His desire for a parental figure would not allow him to see Palpatine's true nature nor realise (until it is too late) that Sidious has been using him as his tool and that his "sympathy" has been false. While Anakin takes his first fateful steps away from his loving mother in The Phantom Menace, his new parental figure creates a metaphorical bridge for The Chosen One to cross over to the dark side in Revenge of the Sith. This proves Yoda's statement to Anakin (about fear eventually leading to suffering) right. Anakin starts off as an intelligent and kind boy but is hesitant to leave his mother behind. His story arc in the prequel trilogy concludes with being encased in a life support suit and having Sidious and the dark side as his only companions – thus contributing to his suffering and isolation from the galaxy.

Although the prequel trilogy ends in tragedy with the fall of the Republic, the Great Jedi Purge, Anakin's transformation into Darth Vader and the heroes facing an uncertain future, the audience knows what the future holds for the survivors; Anakin, Luke, Leia and the rebellion defeating Darth Sidious and the Empire. The hope is symbolised in the last scene of the prequel trilogy which resembles the scene of Luke gazing out into the sunset; both scenes feature Luke, the same music and set in the Lars homestead. While the original trilogy adds dramatic irony to the prequel trilogy, the prequel trilogy adds new perspectives and backstories to established characters in the original trilogy. The prequel trilogy significantly expands Ben Kenobi's backstory of Anakin from Return of the Jedi. While Vader's role changes from villain to redeemable character in Return of the Jedi, the prequel trilogy adds another perspective to his character; a tragic fallen hero who would eventually find his way back and fulfill the prophecy of The Chosen One at the end of the original trilogy.

== Re-releases ==
The films have been made available on many home video formats, most notably on DVD and Blu-ray. Like the "Special Edition" re-issue of the original trilogy, Lucasfilm has altered the films with each release, although these additional changes are minor.

A 3D theatrical re-release was planned for the then-six-film franchise beginning with The Phantom Menace in February 2012. However, following Disney's purchase of Lucasfilm, the subsequent releases were canceled to focus on the sequel trilogy. The trilogy was made available for streaming on Disney+ upon the service's launch in late 2019.

== Reception ==
=== Box office performance ===
Film	Release date	Budget	Box office revenue				Box office ranking		Ref.
Film	Release date	Budget	North America	Adjusted for inflation (North America) (Note: Adjusting for inflation is complicated by the fact that the first four films have had multiple releases in different years, so their earnings cannot be simply adjusted by the initial year of release. Inflation-adjusted figures for 2005 can be found in Block, Alex Ben; Wilson, Lucy Autrey, eds. (2010). George Lucas's Blockbusting: A Decade-By-Decade Survey of Timeless Movies Including Untold Secrets of Their Financial and Cultural Success. HarperCollins. p. 519. ISBN 978-0-06-177889-6. Adjustment to constant dollars is undertaken in conjunction with the United States Consumer Price Index provided by the Federal Reserve Bank of Minneapolis, using 2005 as the base year.)	Other territories	Worldwide	All-time North America	All-time worldwide	Ref.
The Phantom Menace	May 19, 1999	$115 million	$487,574,671	$815,518,000	$558,938,785	$1,034,458,044	#23	#47	
Attack of the Clones	May 16, 2002	$115 million	$310,676,740	$482,820,000	$346,018,875	$656,695,615	#102	#161	
Revenge of the Sith	May 19, 2005	$113 million	$414,378,291	$535,701,000	$488,513,692	$902,891,983	#43	#76	
Total		$343 million	$1,165,491,994	1,834,039,000	$1,360,986,646	$2,526,478,640			

=== Critical response ===
Film	Rotten Tomatoes	Metacritic	CinemaScore
The Phantom Menace	52% (5.90/10 average rating) (242 reviews)	51 (36 reviews)	A−
Attack of the Clones	61% (6.50/10 average rating) (257 reviews)	54 (39 reviews)	A−
Revenge of the Sith	79% (7.30/10 average rating) (305 reviews)	68 (40 reviews)	A−

The prequel trilogy received mixed reviews, generally improving in critical reception with each installment. Common criticisms surrounded the over-reliance on computer-generated imagery, wooden dialogue (including scenes of romance between Anakin and Padmé), slow-paced political scenes, and the comic relief character of Jar Jar Binks, whose role was reduced after the first film. (Note: The character was so disliked, even by fans, that actor Ahmed Best said he contemplated suicide.) Several alien characters introduced in The Phantom Menace have been subject to accusations of racial stereotypes. Jar Jar is asserted to caricature a stereotyped Jamaican, while the Gungan species at large has been said to suggest a primitive African tribe. The greedy Neimoidians of the Trade Federation have been noted as resembling East Asian stereotypes with some deliberately given Thai accents, and Watto's mannerisms and hooked nose appearance were based on footage of Alec Guinness as the Jewish character Fagin in the 1948 film Oliver Twist, leading some to assert that the slave-owning character is a Jewish stereotype. Lucas denied all accusations of racial stereotypes.

Many expressed their disappointment with the trilogy's portrayal of Anakin Skywalker, particularly calling the writing weak and the dialogue wooden, although Hayden Christensen's performance in the third film was more well received. Contrarily, Ewan McGregor's portrayal of Obi-Wan Kenobi, following in the footsteps of Alec Guinness, has been generally praised. Natalie Portman has expressed her disappointment with the trilogy's negative reception, saying that "When something has that much anticipation it can almost only disappoint". She also acknowledged that "With the perspective of time, it's been re-evaluated by a lot of people who actually really love them now".

The trilogy has also received some criticism for clashing aesthetically with the original trilogy. While the older films feature rough and aged technology, the prequels depict relatively sleek and new industrial designs. Some have criticized this design choice by saying that it makes the earlier time period appear to depict a more advanced civilization, although Revenge of the Sith brings the design closer to that of the original trilogy. Lucas has called the choice clever, as it illustrates the halt of technological innovation in a time period of civil war.

Conversely, some argue for the prequel trilogy's positive elements, including its handling of political issues, especially involving the rise of fascism. This includes Star Wars: The Last Jedi director and writer Rian Johnson, who also praised its visual effects innovations. Jar Jar Binks has been regarded as the first fully CGI character in a live-action film, and perceived as paving the way for Gollum in The Lord of the Rings. KING-TV's Kelly Lawler complimented the lightsaber battles as "sleeker affairs with better choreography and more athleticism" compared to the original trilogy. J. J. Abrams praised the acting of Ian McDiarmid as Darth Sidious, stating that the scene where he recounts the tragedy of Darth Plagueis is the best of the trilogy.

George Lucas has responded to the negative criticism by saying that, like the original films, they were intended "for 12-year-olds", while acknowledging that fans who saw the originals when they were young had different expectations as adults. The prequels have been noted as retaining a dedicated fanbase, primarily composed of Millennials and Gen Zers who were children at the time of their release. Since the late 2010s, the prequels have amassed a cult following via Internet memes on social media, with Neel Patel of Syfy Wire attributing this to the internet being a "paradise of irreverence, just like George Lucas' scripts". Additionally, both the animated series Star Wars: The Clone Wars and Disney's sequel trilogy has been noted to have retroactively improved the perception of the prequel trilogy among fans.

Screen Rant favorably compared the way the prequels ended the saga compared to the sequels, writing, "Amidst the bad execution of the story, the fact of the matter is, the prequel movies tell one coherent narrative, with a clear through-line between movies – this is something sorely lacking in the sequel trilogy". Similarly, Den of Geek's Andrew Blair wrote that the prequels were "enjoying a deserved reappraisal" following vocal discourse surrounding the sequels. He considered the prequels to be the superior trilogy as, in contrast to its successors, the films had "consistency" and "the product of a singular vision".

=== Accolades ===
==== Academy Awards ====
Academy Awards	Film		
Academy Awards	The Phantom Menace	Attack of the Clones	Revenge of the Sith
Academy Awards	72nd Academy Awards	75th Academy Awards	78th Academy Awards
Best Makeup and Hairstyling	—N/a	—N/a	Nominated
Best Sound Editing	Nominated	—N/a	—N/a
Best Sound Mixing	Nominated	—N/a	—N/a
Best Visual Effects	Nominated	Nominated	—N/a
