= All the Right Noises =

1970 British film by Gerry O'Hara

- US film poster
- Directed by: Gerry O'Hara
- Written by: Gerry O'Hara
- Produced by: John Quested; Si Litvinoff
- Starring: Olivia Hussey; Tom Bell; Judy Carne
- Cinematography: Gerry Fisher
- Edited by: Antony Gibbs
- Music by: Melanie
- Production companies: Max L. Raab-Si Litvinoff Films; Trigon Productions
- Distributed by: 20th Century Fox
- Release date: May 1971; (London)
- Running time: 92 minutes
- Country: United Kingdom
- Language: English

All the Right Noises is a 1970 British romantic drama film written and directed by Gerry O'Hara and starring Tom Bell, Olivia Hussey, Judy Carne and John Standing.

== Plot ==
Len Lewin, who works as a lighting technician for a theatrical company, is happily married to his wife Joy and they have two young children. Despite his commitment to his family, he sleeps with Val, an actress in the show, who later reveals that she is 15; despite this he continues the affair. The girl believes she might be pregnant, but is not. The affair ends amicably and the man's wife never finds out.

== Cast ==
- Tom Bell as Len Lewin
- Olivia Hussey as Val
- Judy Carne as Joy Lewin
- John Standing as Bernie
- Roy Herrick as camera operator (uncredited)
- Yootha Joyce as Mrs Bird
- Robert Keegan as Len's father
- Lesley-Anne Down as Laura
- Marianne Stone as landlady
- Gordon Griffin as Terry
- Edward Higgins as Ted
- Rudolph Walker as Gordon
- Oscar James as Guard
- Chloe Franks as Jenny Lewin
- Gareth Wright as Ian
- Chrissie Shrimpton as waitress
- Peter Burton as stage manager
- Charles Lloyd-Pack as stagedoor keeper
- Otto Diamant as conductor
- Nicolette Roeg as Millie
- Paul Whitsun-Jones as Mr. Melchum
- Aubrey Woods as foreman
- Belinda Sinclair as Lottie
- Roderick Jones as first musician (uncredited)

== Production ==
=== Background ===
Judy Carne said the film was based on a real-life incident involving Gerry O'Hara's friend Nicholas Roeg, who recommended Carne to play Tom Bell's wife because she resembled Roeg's wife.

O'Hara said he wrote the film with Tom Bell in mind for the lead role as he was friends with Bell since they made The L Shaped Room (1962) together. O'Hara gave the script to Roeg who helped set up the project with Si Litvinoff, who produced Walkabout (1971) and was interested making a film in England.

It was the first in a slate of films from Max Raab and Litvinoff that also included A Clockwork Orange (1971).

Although made in 1969 it was not released until 1971.

=== Filming ===
Filming began in London in April 1969. It was a nine-week shoot and O'Hara said "I had pretty much total creative control, which is very rare." He also said "I love that film ... probably my best film."

== Release ==
=== Critical reception ===
The Monthly Film Bulletin wrote: "After a couple of rather nondescript espionage adventures, Gerry O'Hara here makes a welcome return to the mood of his earlier Pleasure Girls (1965). Combining adultery with an old-fashioned backstage setting, All the Right Noises does nothing more than rework familiar themes; but it is built on a solid framework of disciplined direction and animated performances (particularly from Judy Carne in her first leading role), and O'Hara's own script, strong on characterisation, makes the vacillating emotions credible and keeps the dialogue refreshingly natural. (Joy's first post-coital murmur is 'As much as I love you, if you don't move soon you're gonna crush me ribs'). Some idyllic chases around parks and beaches are the only regrettable lapses; and although it seems indulgent of O'Hara to develop the sequence of Joy's premature arrival home into a suspense sketch (constant intercutting between Joy's rapid progress from the airport, and Val taking an age to leave the flat), like nearly everything else in the film, it does work."

Variety said the film had "tenuous ties to the angry-young-man school of British filmmaking in the late fifties, but lacks the force, ire and social attitudes. Instead, all concerned seem unconcerned, voices are never raised and the atmosphere remains one of self-consciously “adult” sensibility that generates little dramatic excitement."

The Evening Standard called it "accurate and compelling".

Liverpool Daily Post called it "neatly observed and nicely edited."

Leslie Halliwell said: "Sharp, sensible treatment of a cliché situation, as watchable as a superior television play."

The Radio Times Guide to Films gave the film 3/5 stars, writing: "This study of age-gap passion in Swinging London sat on a shelf for two years and is a difficult watch in the post-Savile era, given that it follows the developing relationship between a 30-something theatre electrician Tom Bell and chorus girl Olivia Hussey. Trouble is, he has forgotten to mention he has a wife and kids, and she's omitted that she's 15 and still at school. Capturing the free love spirit of the time, O'Hara refuses to judge either, but viewed now this is bound to provoke debate."

=== Home media ===
The BFI released All the Right Noises on DVD and Blu-ray through its Flipside strand.
