= Walkabout =

Australian Aboriginal cultural practice

Walkabout is a term dating to the pastoral era in which large numbers of Aboriginal Australians were employed on cattle stations. During the tropical wet season, when there was little work on the stations, many would return to their traditional life back home.

The term was also used to describe unexplained absences of any kind. This was commonly treated as the product of what was erroneously assumed to be a nomadic predisposition to wander aimlessly.

On the first Australian season of You Can't Ask That, Indigenous Australians described culturally significant practices, including care for country. In answer to "Do you ever go walkabout?" one speaker responded "when our grandfather says we are ready to go walkabout. And so walkabout is like men business or woman business... It's really powerful, like it's really strong, we need something like that. You know it's like - we make the lore strong, so it will continue. Keep the story, the song lines, and everything, keep flowing. So we don't stop it. We teach the next generation, and they teach the next generation, and so on."

== See also ==
- Australian Aboriginal culture
- Walkabout, a 1971 film based on a book of the same name
- The Songlines, a book combining fiction and non-fiction by writer Bruce Chatwin
- Australian Walkabout, television series
