= Luc Roeg =

British film producer

- Born: 26 January 1962 (age 64); Wandsworth, London, England
- Occupations: Film producer, cinematographer

Luc Roeg is a British cinematographer and film producer, founder of the "Independent Entertainment" production company.

== Biography ==
=== Family and early years ===
Luc Roeg was born on 26 January 1962, to Nicolas Roeg and Susan Stephen.

Aged 7, Luc Roeg played White Boy in Walkabout, his father's first film as solo director. In titles, he was credited as Lucien John.

=== Career ===
In 2007, Luc Roeg launched his own production company, "Independent Entertainment". In 2011, Independent Entertainment linked up with John Sloss's Cinetic Media.

Independent Entertainment's credits include My Policeman, Lynne Ramsay’s We Need to Talk About Kevin, Mr Nice, New Town Killers, The Sea, The Falling, and many more.

As of 2023, his company engaged in production of horror Tender Omens, a sci-fi thriller Beyond The Deep, and a biopic Relax about the UK band Frankie Goes to Hollywood.
