= Michael Reed (cinematographer) =

British cinematographer (1929–2022)

- Born: 7 July 1929; Canada
- Died: 15 December 2022 (aged 93)
- Occupation: Cinematography
- Years active: 1947–1990

Michael Reed, BSC (7 July 1929 – 15 December 2022) was a British cinematographer who worked on films and TV shows from the 1950s to 1980s, including Dracula: Prince of Darkness and Shout at the Devil.

== Career ==
Through the early 1950s he worked in the camera department at Hammer Films as a clapper loader and focus puller on films such as The Man in Black and Meet Simon Cherry before becoming the director of photography on Hammer's The Ugly Duckling (1959) and several Hammer horror films. He acted as director of photography on several ITC television series such as Sword of Freedom, The Adventures of Robin Hood and The Saint. At the same time he was 2nd unit Director of Photography on the James Bond films (Goldfinger, Thunderball and You Only Live Twice).

Reed graduated to big scale film-making with the James Bond film On Her Majesty's Secret Service in 1969.

Reed worked on such British television series as The New Avengers, Press Gang and Philip Marlowe, Private Eye.

== Personal life and death ==
Reed died on 15 December 2022, at the age of 93.

== Selected filmography ==
- Devil's Bait (1959)
- The Ugly Duckling (1959)
- The Devil Ship Pirates (1964)
- The Gorgon (1964)
- Dracula: Prince of Darkness (1965)
- Bang! Bang! You're Dead! (1966)
- Rasputin, the Mad Monk (1966)
- Prehistoric Women (1967)
- On Her Majesty's Secret Service (1969)
- The Hireling (1973)
- Galileo (1975)
- The Stick Up (1977)
- Leopard in the Snow (1978)
- The Passage (1979)
- Loophole (1981)
- John Wycliffe: The Morning Star (1984)
- Wild Geese II (1985)
- God's Outlaw (1986)
