= Outplacement =

Service helping employees find a new job

Outplacement is a support service provided by some organizations to help former employees transition to new jobs. A consultancy firm usually provides the outplacement services which are paid for by the former employer and are achieved usually through practical advice, training materials and workshops. Some organizations offer psychological support.

Outplacement may be delivered through individual one-on-one sessions or in a group format. Topics include career guidance, career evaluation, job search skills, targeting the job market, resume writing, interview preparation, developing networks, and negotiation.

Consultants support individuals seeking a new job, and also those looking to start a new business, retire, or structure a portfolio of activities. Programs have time limits, ranging from a few months to more extended periods, such as 12 months and are offered at all levels of the organization, from workers to corporate employees.

Outplacement provides former employees structure and guidance towards new career options, and preserves the morale of those who remain in the company who see that colleagues are given the necessary support when they leave the company.

== History ==
The term outplacement was coined more than 30 years ago by James E. Challenger, the founder of Challenger, Gray & Christmas, a Chicago-based career consultancy. Challenger created the concept of outplacement and the initial programs to implement it.

With the increased rates of downsizing, rightsizing, redundancies and layoffs, particularly during the 1980s and 1990s, businesses increasingly found a need for some form of assistance in reducing the trauma of redundancy for both departing employees and those who remain. Indeed, research shows that losing one's job is one of the most stressful experiences a person can face other than death and divorce.

== Criticism ==
The Wall Street Journal reported in 2009 that U.S. corporations were dissatisfied with the quality of outplacement services they received:

As demand rises in the $4 billion-a-year outplacement business, providers increasingly offer standardized services, which some workers say offer little value. Businesses anxious to shed former employees quickly and cheaply impose time limits that hamper effectiveness. Few employers track whether outplacement works.

The best outplacement programs provide ongoing support, as it is often the case that after the individual has not been able to find a new job after searching for a number of weeks that they need the most help. Many companies will stop providing support after an allotted time although some companies provide support for as long as the individual needs it. Some also track the success rate of re-employment to help evaluate their services.
