= Donald G. Payne =

English author (1924–2018)

- Born: Donald Gordon Payne; 3 January 1924; London, Greater London, England
- Died: 22 August 2018 (aged 94); Redhill, Surrey, England
- Writing career
- Pen name: James Vance Marshall; Ian Cameron; Donald Gordon
- Genres: maritime history, military history, maritime fiction, military fiction, science fiction, adventure, lost world
- Subject: World War II

Donald Gordon Payne (3 January 1924 – 22 August 2018) was an English author, most famous for his 1959 novel, Walkabout. Payne was made a Fellow of the Royal Geographical Society in 1962.

== Biography ==
Donald Gordon Payne was born in Denmark Hill in southeast London. His father, Francis Payne, was from New Zealand and had served with the ANZACs in World War I, and his mother was Evelyn Rodgers, who had served as a nurse in World War I. As a child he travelled with his parents to New Zealand and Australia. He went to school at Dulwich College Preparatory, and then to Charterhouse School.

Payne enlisted in 1943 and served with the Fleet Air Arm as a pilot flying Fairey Swordfish during World War II, escorting convoys across the Atlantic and to Russia.

After the war, he took Honours in History at Corpus Christi College, Oxford. After graduating, he worked for publishing firms as an editor, in sales, and as a ghostwriter. In 1953, he had his first book published, Dorset Harbours under his own name. In 1947, he married Barbara Back, with whom he had four sons and one daughter. In 1958, his first novel, The Midnight Sea, was published under the pseudonym Ian Cameron. After the success of this novel, he took up writing full-time.

For his next work, Payne borrowed the pseudonym James Vance Marshall from the name of the Australian outback traveller and writer James Vance Marshall (1887–1964), whose writings provided much of the source material for what would become his most famous work, the 1959 novel Walkabout. Walkabout was originally published as The Children. In 1971, Walkabout was made into an acclaimed movie by the director Nicolas Roeg, featuring the British actress Jenny Agutter and Australian Indigenous actor David Gulpilil.

After the book's success, Payne, with the permission of the Marshall family, continued to use the pseudonym for a number of novels, including A River Ran Out of Eden (1962; filmed as The Golden Seal in 1983), and for several other stories set in Australia; A Walk to the Hills of the Dreamtime (1970), and Stories from the Billabong (2008), and How Turtle Got His Shell and Other Stories (aka More Stories from the Billabong) (2013).

Payne mainly used the pseudonym Ian Cameron, under which he wrote many exploration and discovery nonfiction and fiction books. Among the nonfiction titles is Riders of the Storm (2002), an official history of the Royal National Lifeboat Institution. The fiction titles include the old-time adventure novels The Lost Ones (1961), which was filmed by The Walt Disney Company as The Island at the Top of the World (1974), The Mountains at the Bottom of the World (1972) and The White Ship (1975).

Under the pseudonym Donald Gordon, he wrote four novels. Payne also edited several Reader's Digest volumes, such as the Travels & Adventure series.

Donald G. Payne was also a painter and keen gardener, and played tennis and lawn bowls. He lived in Surrey, England. He died on 22 August 2018 in Redhill, in East Surrey Hospital.

== Works ==
As Donald Payne:

- Dorset Harbours (1953)

Under the pseudonym James Vance Marshall

- Walkabout (1959; originally published as The Children)
- A River Ran Out of Eden (1962)
- My Boy John That Went to Sea (1966)
- A Walk to the Hills of the Dreamtime (1970)
- The Wind at Morning (1973)
- Still Waters (1982)
- White-Out (1999)
- Stories from the Billabong (2008) (with Francis Firebrace)
- How Turtle Got His Shell and Other Stories (2013) (aka More stories from the Billabong) (with Francis Firebrace)

Under the pseudonym Ian Cameron

- The Midnight Sea (1958)
- Red Duster, White Ensign: the Story of Malta and the Malta Convoys (1959)
- The Lost Ones (1961)
- Wings of the Morning (1962)
- Lodestone and Evening Star: the Epic Voyages of Discovery 1493BC–1896AD (1965)
- The Impossible Dream (1971)
- The Mountains at the Bottom of the World (1972)
- Magellan and the First Circumnavigation of the World (1974)
- Antarctica: The Last Continent (1974)
- The White Ship (1975)
- The Young Eagles (1979)
- To the Farthest Ends of the Earth (1980)
- Mountains of the Gods: The Himalayas and the Mountains of Central Asia (1984)
- Exploring Antarctica (1984)
- Exploring Africa (1984)
- Exploring Australia (1985)
- Exploring the Himalayas (1985)
- Lost Paradise: The Exploration of the Pacific (1987)
- Kingdom of the Sun God: A History of the Andes (1989)
- Explorers and Exploration (1991)
- Riders of the Storm: The Story of the Royal National Lifeboat Institution (2002)

Under the pseudonym Donald Gordon

- Star-Raker (1962)
- Flight of the Bat (1963)
- The Golden Oyster (1967)
- Leap in the Dark (1970)
