= Loophole (1981 film) =

- Theatrical release poster
- Directed by: John Quested
- Screenplay by: Jonathan Hales
- Based on: Robert Pollock (Based on the 1972 novel by)
- Produced by: Julian Holloway; David Korda
- Starring: Albert Finney; Martin Sheen
- Cinematography: Michael Reed
- Edited by: Ralph Sheldon
- Music by: Lalo Schifrin
- Production company: Brent Walker
- Distributed by: Goldcrest Films International
- Release date: 13 March 1981 (UK)
- Running time: 105 minutes
- Country: United Kingdom
- Language: English
- Budget: $6.25 million

Loophole (also known as Break In – Plunged into the Abyss of the Underworld) is a 1981 British heist crime film directed by John Quested and starring Albert Finney, Martin Sheen, Susannah York, Jonathan Pryce, Colin Blakely and Tony Doyle. It was written by Jonathan Hales, based upon the 1972 novel by Robert Pollock. The music was by Lalo Schifrin.

== Plot ==
The film opens with a safe-break that yields unexpectedly low gains for the robbers. Daniels plots the bank robbery, having targeted this institution because he has discovered that the main subterranean vault, thought to be impregnable, lies within a short distance of a main sewer. Enlisting the services of a boat-dealer to supply equipment, he targets Booker who, as an architect, has the skill needed to pinpoint the exact location underground. Booker angrily rejects the first approach from Daniels but later, harassed by his bank manager and having to support a new business venture by his wife, he agrees on the undertaking, provided that no violence is to be used.

With Gardner keeping watch from a rented nearby office, the titular loophole of the sewer access is utilized by the robbery crew, setting off the bank alarms on entering the vault from beneath and continuing to empty the contents when the police arrive. The police decide the alarms are defective and turn them off for the evening.

As the gang is preparing to leave, a heavy downpour of rain starts to flood the sewer system and the gang is seen to struggle against a raging torrent as they are laden with spoils. Booker refuses to leave and remains in the vault hoping the water will go down before the vault is open on business hours. One of the robbers who had been injured by inhaling sewer gas earlier in the scene, Harry, is seen floating away and is assumed to have died. The final scenes show Booker in his own studio, when Daniels visits him to offer him another job.

== Cast ==
- Albert Finney as Mike Daniels
- Martin Sheen as Stephen Booker
- Susannah York as Dinah Booker
- Colin Blakely as Gardner
- Jonathan Pryce as Taylor
- Robert Morley as Godfrey
- Alfred Lynch as Harry
- Tony Doyle as Nolan
- Christopher Guard as Cliff
- Gwyneth Powell as Doreen
- Jerry Harte as Maxwell
- James Grout as Fairbrother
- Terrence Hardiman as David
- Bridget Brice as Emily
- Ian Howarth as Matthew
- Harriet Collins as Dorah
- Clive Graham as Inspector
- James Linton as security man
- James Cossins as 1st interviewer
- Constantine Gregory as 2nd interviewer (as Constantin de Goguel)
- Timothy Bateson as 3rd interviewer
- Donna Reading as receptionist
- Fanny Carby as cleaning lady
- Jennifer Granville as Frances
- Jonathan Hales as driver
- Wally Thomas as car park attendant
- Lisa Coleman as Daniels' daughter
- Amy Dagley as Daniels' daughter
- Saskia Cox as Daniels' daughter
- Lloyd McGuire as Police Sergeant
- Derek Hollis as policeman
- Raymond Mason as porter

== Reception ==
Variety wrote: "A clever plan to knock off a rich London bank is about the only thing that works in Loophole. The caper, filmed in and around the British capital, squanders some fine talent on a trite, low-voltage script."

The Monthly Film Bulletin wrote: "Despite its modern livery and topical sub-text (unemployment among the overpaid), there is an air of weary nostalgia about this old-hat heist movie, as if the Merton Park Studios had been temporarily resurrected to do a remake of The League of Gentlemen. The whiff of the past is made all the more pungent by the casting of an American in the leading role, and by the presence of first-rate British actors stoically treating a second-rate script like one of the classics. John Quested, in fact, might have done worse than to have studied the timing of those Scotland Yard quickies of the Fifties, for pace is what is sorely lacking in Loophole."

In The New York Times, Vincent Canby wrote: "Loophole, a 1983 English movie about a bank robbery, is of such ineptitude that you are allowed to suspect there's a far more interesting (and possibly more cautionary) story behind the screen than anything that's on it. ... Jonathan Hales's screenplay, an anthology of irrelevant detail, appears to have been directed by John Quested by long-distance telephone and then edited by a committee of financial receivers. The actors look bewildered."

Loophole has a 25% rating on Rotten Tomatoes.
