= Leopard in the Snow =

- Theatrical release poster
- Directed by: Gerry O'Hara
- Written by: Jill Hyem
- Based on: Leopard in the Snow by Anne Mather
- Produced by: Christopher Harrop; John Quested
- Starring: Keir Dullea; Susan Penhaligon; Kenneth More; Billie Whitelaw
- Cinematography: Michael Reed
- Edited by: Eddy Joseph
- Music by: Kenneth V. Jones
- Distributed by: Enterprise Pictures Limited (United Kingdom); Danton Films (Canada)
- Release date: March 1978
- Running time: 94 minutes
- Countries: United Kingdom; Canada
- Language: English

Leopard in the Snow is a 1978 British drama film directed by Gerry O'Hara and starring Keir Dullea, Susan Penhaligon, Kenneth More and Billie Whitelaw. It was written by Anne Mather and Jill Hyem based on Mather's 1974 novel of the same title.

== Plot ==
In the middle of a blizzard, a young woman takes shelter in a house owned by a former racing driver still recovering from an accident he had some years before.

== Cast ==
- Keir Dullea as Dominic Lyall
- Susan Penhaligon as Helen James
- Kenneth More as Sir Phillip James
- Billie Whitelaw as Isabel James
- Gordon Thomson as Michael Framley
- Jeremy Kemp as Bolt
- Yvonne Masters as Bessie
- Peter Burton as Mr Framley
- Tessa Dahl as Miss Framley

== Reception ==
John Gillett wrote in The Monthly Film Bulletin wrote: "Sponsored by a Canadian-based publisher of romantic fiction, this is another laboured attempt to milk the family and/or women's market with a sad little romance (again featuring illness and mild deformity) which soggily makes its way towards a happy ending. It starts with the advantage of a pretty setting – lonely house set in a stark, snow-filled landscape, with Canada standing in for Cumberland – but neither of the two leads can make much of their predictable relationship, with Susan Penhaligon awkwardly labouring with her lines while Keir Dullea spits his out as if he wished to be rid of them as quickly as possible. The script is rather artful in suggesting that some great erotic sequence will suddenly erupt (which it never does)."

Boxoffice wrote: "Harlequin Romances are like some automobiles, assembled with interchangeable parts, which tends to create the illusion of an ongoing theme from book to book. This is the film version of one of the Harlequin novels. ... Director Gerry O'Hara allows Kenneth V. Jones' musical score to accent dramatic moments, thus achieving effective audience-reaction control. Billie Whitelaw, the nanny in The Omen, offers a brief, effective portrayal of a not-so-evil stepmother. The most likeable performance probably is that of Jeremy Kemp as Dullea's sympathetic valet. There is some lovely, snowy scenery in this John Quested-Chris Harrop production, beautifully photographed in Technicolor on location in Canada. The attraction of the picture will be powerful for TV soap-opera buffs, making it ideal for ladies' matinee programs."
