= Jonathan Hales =

British writer (born 1937)

- Born: 10 May 1937 (age 89); England
- Occupations: playwright and screenwriter
- Years active: 1970–present

Jonathan Hales (born 10 May 1937) is a British playwright and screenwriter. He is noted for his work with George Lucas, including The Young Indiana Jones Chronicles television series and Star Wars: Episode II – Attack of the Clones.

== Career ==
Hales has worked extensively in the theatre (both as actor and stage director), film and television. He began his screenwriting career in 1970, with the British television series Manhunt. Hales has written for the American series Dallas, as well as many iterations — series and DVD releases — of George Lucas's The Adventures of Young Indiana Jones.

In 1977 he directed the stage play Mecca by E. A. Whitehead at the Open Space Theatre, London.

Hales wrote the 1980 Agatha Christie film The Mirror Crack'd. He is credited with the story for the 2002 prequel to The Mummy, The Scorpion King, and is co-author (with George Lucas) of the screenplay for 2002's Star Wars film Star Wars: Episode II – Attack of the Clones.

Writing the middle film in the Star Wars prequel trilogy, Lucas and Hales continued to refine their script as production began. The production draft was completed less than a week before commencement of principal photography. Hales worked with Lucas as costumes were designed and sets were constructed. “At that stage, Attack of the Clones felt like a ‘virtual film’ because we got the script only three days before we started shooting,” recalls producer Rick McCallum. “We had to build these sets to a script that didn’t exist.”

== Screenwriting filmography ==
=== Film ===
Year	Name	Director	Notes
1980	The Mirror Crack'd	Guy Hamilton	
1981	Loophole	John Quested	Also in role ''Driver''
1983	High Road to China	Brian G. Hutton	Uncredited
2002	The Scorpion King	Chuck Russell	Story only
2002	Star Wars Episode II - Attack of the Clones	George Lucas	Story written by George Lucas Screenplay co-written with George Lucas

=== Television ===
Year	Name	Episode(s)	Director	Notes
1970	Manhunt	Open House	Bill Bain	
1970	Manhunt	A Different Kind of War	Rex Firkin	
1970	Manhunt	The Enemy You Know	Bill Bain	
1970	Manhunt	One Way Home	Bill Bain	
1970	Manhunt	Intent to Steal	Robert Tronson	
1971	The Guardians	The Nature of the Beast	Mike Newell	Also in role ''First Man''
1971	The Guardians	The Killing Trade	Derek Bailey	
1972	Villains	Smudger	Jim Goddard	
1973	Centre Play	Places Where They Sing	Bill Hays	Co-written with Simon Raven
1973	Armchair Theatre	Brussels Sprouts-Boy Scouts	Jim Goddard	
1979	Kids	Brenda	John Frankau	
1981	Armchair Thriller	The Chelsea Murders	Derek Bennett	
1983	Partners in Crime	The House of Lurking Death	Christopher Hodson	
1984	Partners in Crime	The Sunningdale Mystery	Tony Wharmby	
1984	Partners in Crime	The Case of the Missing Lady	Paul Annett	
1985	Dempsey and Makepeace	Given to Acts of Violence	William Brayne	
1985	Dempsey and Makepeace	Hors de Combat	Christian Marnham	
1988	Dallas	The Call of the Wild	Michael Preece	
1991	Van der Valk	Doctor Hoffmann's Children	Anthony Simmons	
1992	The Young Indiana Jones Chronicles	Young Indiana Jones and the Curse of the Jackal	Jim O'Brien & Carl Schultz	Story written by George Lucas
1993	The Young Indiana Jones Chronicles	Young Indiana Jones and the Scandal of 1920	Syd Macartney	
1993	The Young Indiana Jones Chronicles	Northern Italy, June 1918	Bille August	
1993	The Young Indiana Jones Chronicles	Ireland, April 1916	Gillies MacKinnon	
1993	The Young Indiana Jones Chronicles	Paris, May 1919	David Hare	
1994	The Young Indiana Jones Chronicles	Young Indiana Jones and the Hollywood Follies	Michael Schultz	
1994	Grand Nord	Bari	Arnaud Sélignac	
1995	Grand Nord	Kazan	Arnaud Sélignac	
1996	The Young Indiana Jones Chronicles	Young Indiana Jones: Travels with Father	Michael Schultz	
1999	The Adventures of Young Indiana Jones	Tales of Innocence	Michael Schultz	New segment Morocco, November 1917
2001	The Adventures of Young Indiana Jones	Winds of Change	Michael Schultz	Additional scenes Princeton, 1919
