= Si Litvinoff =

American film producer and lawyer (1929–2022)

- Born: April 5, 1929; New York, U.S.
- Died: December 26, 2022 (aged 93); Los Angeles, California, U.S.
- Occupations: Film producer Lawyer
- Notable work: Walkabout; The Queen

Si Litvinoff (April 5, 1929 – December 26, 2022) was an American film producer and lawyer. He served as a producer on Walkabout, All the Right Noises, and the documentary The Queen. He also served as an executive producer on A Clockwork Orange and The Man Who Fell to Earth. In 1954, he received his law degree from New York University. When he was a lawyer, his clients included Rip Torn, Andy Warhol, Bea Arthur, and Alan Arkin. Litvinoff was a member of the Academy of Motion Picture Arts and Sciences and its foreign language screening committee.

Litvinoff died in Los Angeles on December 26, 2022, at the age of 93.
