= Cinetic Media =

American film financing and distribution company

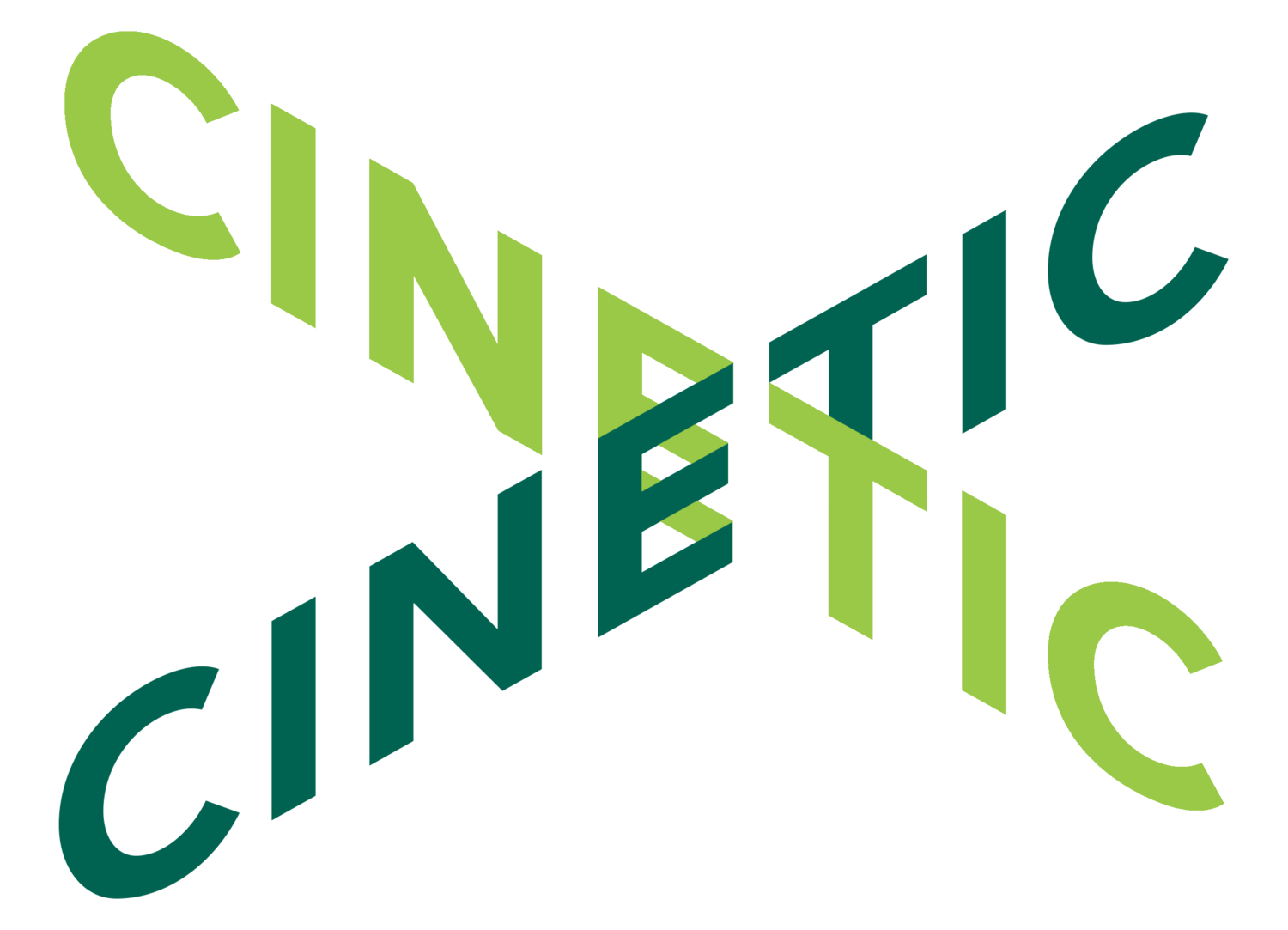
- Company type: Private
- Industry: Motion picture
- Founder: John Sloss
- Headquarters: New York City, New York, United States
- Key people: John Sloss
- Products: Film financing; Film production; Film distribution
- Website: cineticmedia.com

Cinetic Media is an American film financing and film distribution company that specializes in releasing independent films theatrically and through video on demand.

The company was founded in 2001 by John Sloss.

Among the clients of Cinetic are Jennifer Westfeldt (Friends With Kids), Matthew Heineman (Cartel Land), Ellar Coltrane (Boyhood), Carol, Asif Kapadia (Ali and Nino), Brian Oakes (Jim: The James Foley Story), Rebecca Miller (Maggie’s Plan), Josh Fox (How to Let Go of the World) and Maggie Greenwald (Sophie and the Rising Sun), Little Miss Sunshine, Napoleon Dynamite, and many more.

By 2008, the company had evolved from a sales and financing outfit into a full-service provider of feature films. In 2008, Cinetic established its own fund with Aver Media, money from the fund will go to help finalize the production of the projects already in production.

In 2011, Cinetic linked up with Luc Roeg‘s Independent Entertainment.
