= What About Me (film) =

1993 film directed by Rachel Amodeo

What About Me is a 1993 American film drama starring, written, and directed by Rachel Amodeo about a young woman who becomes homeless on the streets of New York City.

== Cast ==
- Rachel Amodeo
- Richard Edson
- Johnny Thunders
- Nick Zedd
- Gregory Corso
- Richard Hell
- Dee Dee Ramone
- Judy Carne
- Rockets Redglare
- Jerry Nolan

== Reception ==
=== Critical reaction ===
Aaron Hillis, reviewing the film for The Village Voice in 2014, writes "Come for the cult of personality, stay for the nostalgia of a dirtier, dodgier, far cooler scene.". In 2023, The New Yorker ranked the film #64 in its listing of "The Greatest Independent Films of the Twentieth Century."
