= Walkabout (novel) =

1959 Australian novel

- First hardcover edition (1959, Doubleday & Co.)
- Author: James Vance Marshall
- Original title: The Children
- Language: English
- Genre: Survival
- Published: Michael Joseph, 1959 (as The Children)
- Publication place: United Kingdom
- Media type: Book
- Pages: 125
- OCLC: 11073830

Walkabout is a novel written by James Vance Marshall (a pseudonym for Donald G. Payne), first published in 1959 as The Children. It is about two children, a teenage sister and her younger brother, who get lost in the Australian Outback and are helped by an Indigenous Australian teenage boy on his walkabout. A film based on the book, with the same title came out in 1971, but deviated substantially from the original plot.

== Plot summary ==
Two American siblings, Peter and Mary, are stranded by a gully in the Australian outback following a plane crash. Peter says they should seek out their uncle, who lives in Adelaide; Mary agrees and they begin walking across the desert, but they fail to realise that Adelaide is on the other side of the continent. They are without food save for a small piece of stick candy, and while falling asleep under a quandong tree they have a nightmare about how the captain got them to danger, only to be killed in a blast when he attempted to save the navigator. The next day, they keep walking and searching for food but their efforts are in vain. While atop a bluff, Peter thinks he has found water but Mary makes him turn away to prevent him from becoming delirious, as she knows the silver pools are the salt pans of the outback. Suddenly, an Aboriginal teen of about Mary's age (referred to within the text as the "bush boy") appears and startles them, mostly due to his nudity. Hoping to make him leave, Mary glares at him. This proves ineffective. Hoping to find out about the strangers, he inspects both of them but finds nothing of interest, so he leaves.

Peter and Mary, shocked at potentially losing their only hope for survival, follow him. Peter attempts to communicate with him through gestures of eating and drinking, and the bush boy quickly comes to comprehend their plight. He indicates that they should follow him, which they do. He arrives at a waterhole where the children drink their fill. Then, the bush boy prepares food for the hungry children. After this, he begins to lead the children to the next waterhole. The bush boy misinterprets Mary's look of disgust at his nakedness as her having seen the spirit of death, and falls into a mental euthanasia. While the children are resting, the bush boy withdraws to reflect on the situation, as this has unwittingly placed him in an ethical and moral quandary. He had been on his walkabout, or test of manhood, prior to crossing paths with the white children. According to tribal law, he is not to be with any other people while he is on his walkabout. But the children need help or they will surely perish, and he is disturbed that leaving them behind would be the wrong course of action.

By the time the trio arrive at the next waterhole, the symptoms of the flu Peter has unwittingly passed on to the bush boy are beginning to show in the latter. He begins to worry and decides he must tell the children he needs a burial platform to keep bad spirits from his body and to keep the snakes from "molesting his body" after his death. Peter is gathering firewood, and so to avoid interrupting a man at work, the bush boy seeks Mary, who is bathing. The bush boy doesn't see a bath as something private; he arrives at the pool and Mary is terrified, threatening the bush boy with snarls and a rock. He is confused and becomes depressed, believing that he will not have his burial platform.

Mary goes to Peter and tells him to leave with her, but Peter is concerned about the bush boy and so Mary is forced to stay. Peter tells her that the bush boy is very sick; he realizes that the bush boy could die, while Mary refuses to believe that the flu could be fatal, not understanding the native boy's fear of the Spirit of Death he believes she saw in him. Soon, Mary goes to investigate. Finally, she acknowledges that he is actually dying and forgives him. She lays his head in her lap and he touches her hair. Mary realizes that they are not so different, despite his appearance and language. He dies later in the night. They bury him and leave for the food and water-filled valley Peter was told about by the bush boy before he died.

They stop at a pool where they eat some yabbies (a type of crayfish), observe platypus, and leave. In a valley rich in water, food, and wildlife, they survive for many days with the skills learned from the bush boy. When Peter is playing with a baby koala, Mary demands he stop out of concern the parents may attack. In doing so, the koala latches onto Mary and her dress is destroyed. Mary then reflects that while a week ago nothing more calamitous could have happened to her, now she is at ease with her nakedness. She and Peter then discover some wet clay which they use to draw pictures: Peter draws nature while Mary draws stylish women and her dream house. Eventually, the children see smoke and come across a group of Aboriginal swimmers. A man recognises the drawings. His son owns a "warrigal", or pet dog, which serves as a link between the boy and Peter. The father sees Mary's dream house and realizes Mary and Peter seek civilization. In a wide variety of gestures and drawings, he tells the children that there is a house like that across the hills and demonstrates how to reach there. The overjoyed children thank him and begin their trek back to civilization.

== Reception ==
It is by far Vance's most popular work, due in large part to the success of the related film. Reviewers have praised Walkabout for its detailed and accurate descriptions of the Australian environment.
