= Judy Carne =

British actress (1939–2015)

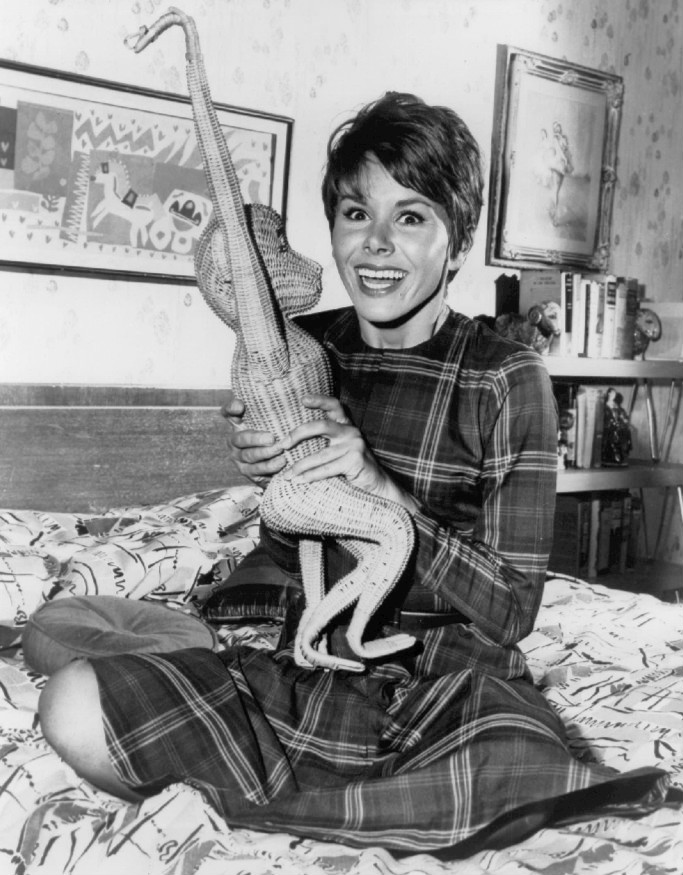
- Carne as Heather Finch in Fair Exchange, 1962
- Born: Joyce Audrey Botterill; 27 April 1939; Northampton, England
- Died: 3 September 2015 (aged 76); Northampton, England
- Occupations: Actress; comedian
- Years active: 1957–1993
- Spouses: Burt Reynolds (m. 1963; div. 1965) Robert Bergmann (m. 1970; div. 1971)

Joyce Audrey Botterill (27 April 1939 – 3 September 2015), known professionally as Judy Carne, was an English actress. She appeared on American television in the late 1960s in Rowan & Martin's Laugh-In, where she employed the catch phrase "Sock it to me!".

== Career ==
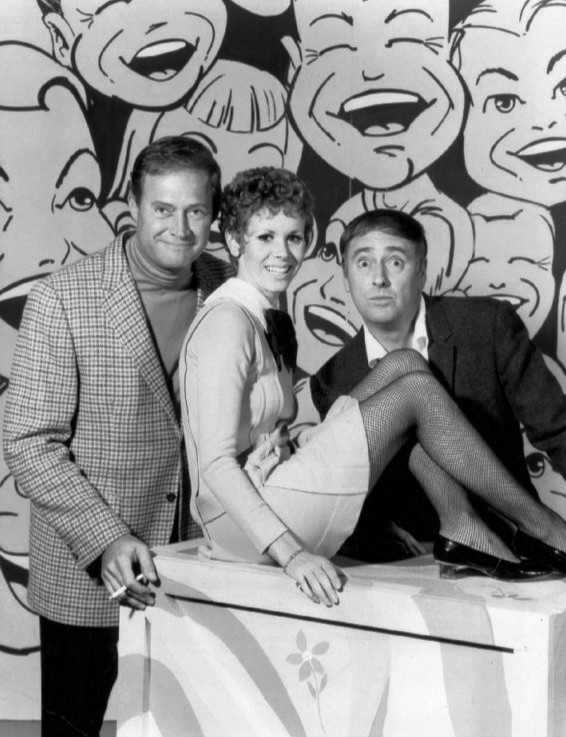
L-R: Dan Rowan, Judy Carne, and Dick Martin on pilot for Rowan & Martin's Laugh-In (1967)

Carne was born in Northampton, England. Her parents, Harold and Kathy, were greengrocers in Kingsthorpe.

She received training at the Pitt-Draffen Academy of Dance before being accepted into the Bush-Davis Theatrical School for Girls in East Grinstead, West Sussex. An instructor at the school began calling her "Judy," telling her that Joyce was not a good professional name. The second part of Judy's stage name was taken from a character named Sarat Carn in the play Bonaventure by English playwright Charlotte Hastings. She made her first British television appearances on the series Danger Man (1961) and episodes of The Rag Trade (also 1961), a BBC sitcom.

She moved to the US not long afterward. Her first regular role was in the sitcom Fair Exchange (1963) as an English teenager who goes to the US to live with an American couple whose daughter (played by Lynn Loring) has gone to live in England. That was followed by The Baileys of Balboa (1964). She later co-starred with Pete Duel in Love on a Rooftop (1966). She made several appearances on the adventure series The Man from U.N.C.L.E.

She had a small part in the ninth episode of the TV series Gidget (1965), guest-starred as Jill in first-season episode 2, "Follow the Leader," and as Floy in second-season episode 3, "Then Came The Mighty Hunter," of 12 O'Clock High (1965), and appeared as herself in episodes of I Dream of Jeannie and Gunsmoke, both in 1966. She appeared in the Bonanza episode "A Question of Strength" (1963) as Sister Mary Kathleen and two episodes of The Big Valley (1967) and guest-starred in episode 11 of the first season of Alias Smith and Jones (1971), an hour-long TV special, "Super Plastic Elastic Goggles" (1971) as a part of the short-lived NBC series, Children's Theater, and the TV adaptation of QB VII (1974). She had roles in the films A Pair of Briefs (1962), The Americanization of Emily (1964), All the Right Noises (1971), and Rachel Amodeo's street movie What About Me (1993) opposite Richard Hell and Johnny Thunders.

On Rowan & Martin's Laugh-In (1968–1970), Carne gained stardom. Her most popular routine ended with her saying "Sock it to me!," at which point she was doused with water or assaulted in some other way. Carne was a regular in the first two seasons (1968–1969); then, having decided the show had become "a big, bloody bore," made occasional guest appearances in the 1969–1970 season. A cast recording, on the Epic Records label, (FXS-15118), was released in 1968. Her recording of "Sock It To Me," with "Right Said Fred" on side 2, (Reprise 0680), was released in April 1968. Carne starred in a revival of the musical The Boy Friend, which opened on Broadway on 14 April 1970 and ran for 111 performances.

In 1993, Carne attended the 25th anniversary of Laugh-In and appeared on a televised Laugh-In Christmas show.

== Personal life and death ==
Carne was married to actor Burt Reynolds from 1963 to 1965 and to producer Robert Bergmann from 3 May 1970 to 1971. Both marriages were brief and childless, and ended in divorce. In 1978, after beating a heroin possession charge, she and her second husband were involved in a car accident. Her neck was broken in the accident, but she recovered. She was later arrested again for heroin possession. In 1986, she was arrested at London's Heathrow Airport and convicted of drug possession. She served two months of a three-month prison sentence in HM Prison Cookham Wood.

Her autobiography, Laughing on the Outside, Crying on the Inside: The Bittersweet Saga of the Sock-It-To-Me Girl (1985), detailed her bisexuality, marriage to and bitter divorce from Burt Reynolds – who unsuccessfully tried to prevent publication of the book – and her experiences with drugs.

Carne moved back to Northamptonshire, England, in the 1980s, living quietly in the village of Church Brampton.

She died from pneumonia on 3 September 2015 at a hospital in Northampton.

=== Political views ===
Carne supported Barry Goldwater in the 1964 United States presidential election.

== Filmography ==
- A Pair of Briefs (1962) as Exotic Dancer (Maid)
- Bonanza (1963) "A Question of Strength" T5S5
- The Americanization of Emily (1964) as 2nd Nameless Broad
- All the Right Noises (1971) as Joy
- Dead Men Tell No Tales (1971, TV film) as Midge Byrnes
- QB VII (1974, TV film) as Natalie
- Only with Married Men (1974, TV film) as Marge West
- What About Me (1993) as Woman of the Streets
