= John Quested (producer) =

British film producer (born 1935)

- Born: 1935 (age 89–90); United Kingdom
- Occupation(s): Film producer, film director
- Spouse: Barbara Ferris (m. 1960; died 2025)

John Quested (born 1935) is an English film producer and director. He has been the owner and chairman of Goldcrest Films since the early 1990s. He began his career as a third assistant director on The Concrete Jungle in 1960 and has gone on to produce numerous feature films over the course of his career.

He was married to the actress Barbara Ferris, sister of diver Liz Ferris, from 1960 until her death in 2025. The couple had three children together.

== Filmography ==
=== Producer ===
- Elvis and Anabelle (2007) (executive producer)
- Milk and Honey (2003) (executive producer)
- To End All Wars (2001) (executive producer)
- Bring Me the Head of Mavis Davis (1997) (executive producer)
- Clockwatchers (1997) (co-executive producer) (uncredited)
- Driftwood (1997) (executive producer)
- No Way Home (1996) (executive producer)
- Scorchers (1991) (executive producer)
- Rock-a-Doodle (1991) (executive producer)
- Black Rainbow (1989) (producer)
- American Gothic (1987) (producer)
- The Return of the Soldier (1982) (executive producer)
- Sunburn (1979) (executive producer)
- The Passage (1979) (producer)
- The Bitch (1979) (producer)
- Leopard in the Snow (1978) (producer)
- The Brute (1977) (producer)
- All the Right Noises (1969) (producer)

=== Second Unit Director or Assistant Director ===
- Bedazzled (1967) (assistant director)
- You Only Live Twice (1967) (first assistant director: second unit) (uncredited)
- Sands of Beersheba (1966) (assistant director)
- The Heroes of Telemark (1965) (assistant director) (uncredited)
- Young Cassidy (1965) (assistant director)
- Of Human Bondage (1964) (assistant director)
- The Ceremony (1963) (assistant director)
- The L-Shaped Room (1962) (assistant director)
- Spare the Rod (1961) (second assistant director) (uncredited)
- The Concrete Jungle (1960) (third assistant director) (uncredited)

=== Director ===
- Loophole (1981)
- Philadelphia, Here I Come (1975)

=== Production Manager ===
- The Lion in Winter (production supervisor)
- The Running Man (1963) (unit manager)
