= Challenger, Gray & Christmas =

American executive outplacement firm

- Type: Outplacement and Career Transition Services
- Industry: Outplacement; Executive coaching
- Founded: 1966 in Chicago, Illinois, United States
- Founder: James E. Challenger
- Number of locations: Offices throughout North America
- Area served: North America and globally
- Key people: John A. Challenger (CEO) Andy Challenger (Chief Revenue Officer)
- Services: Outplacement Services, Executive Coaching
- Website: www.challengergray.com

Challenger, Gray & Christmas is headquartered in Chicago, Illinois, United States, and is the first executive outplacement firm in the US. It has offices throughout North America. James E. Challenger is the founder of the company. The Society for Human Resource Management recognized him in 1996 as the creator and pioneer of the outplacement field. James E. Challenger, the company's founder, spent years trying to persuade companies that it was good business to be nice to people heading involuntarily out the door.

In 2003, John A. Challenger gave testimony before the U.S. House Committee on Small Business on the issue of permanent job loss in a global economy. In 2002, The Wall Street Journal invited Challenger to address the issue in a bylined article that appeared in The Journal on June 25, 2002. He served on the labor/human resource committee of The Federal Reserve Bank of for two three-year terms.

== Early years ==
In 1977, Challenger, Gray & Christmas was recognized among the oldest and largest outplacement firms in the country. The earliest major customers of Challenger, Gray & Christmas included Motorola Inc., McDonald's, United Airlines, Quaker Oats Company and Sears Roebuck & Company.

In 1961, James Challenger was dismissed from his law firm position for taking time off. In 1966, he founded the Challenger, Gray & Christmas, Inc.

He devised a training, counseling, and support program. He told UPI’s Cathy Lewandowski in 1983: “There is no such thing as total job security today. Any individual, no matter what position, should be ready to prepare a clearly defined alternative plan which can be implemented in case of termination.''

== Publications ==
"Outplacement" by James Challenger, 1994.

"The Challenger Guide: Job-Hunting Success for Mid-Career Professionals" by James Challenger, 2000.

== Events and initiatives ==
Since 1985, Challenger has held a 2-day annual Career Help Hotline, also called Call-In Days. Coaches give advice on:

- The job search for new college grads
- The job search for those over age 55
- Retirement
- Explaining a career gap
- Résumé writing
- Interviewing
- Switching industries
- Turning a temporary position into a permanent one
- Military to civilian job searches
- Finding a job after incarceration

The hotline does not place callers with new employers, nor can its coaches review individual résumés.

== Company goals ==
The company's primary goal is to make the transition to reemployment easier for displaced workers. The company states it specializes in sponsoring business benefits and services in the following areas: 1) Communication Strategy & Timing, 2) Phase Out/Shut Down 3) Community Awareness 4) Employee Retention 5) Contingency Planning, 6) Security and 7) Public Agency Involvement.

== Challenger Job Cuts Report ==
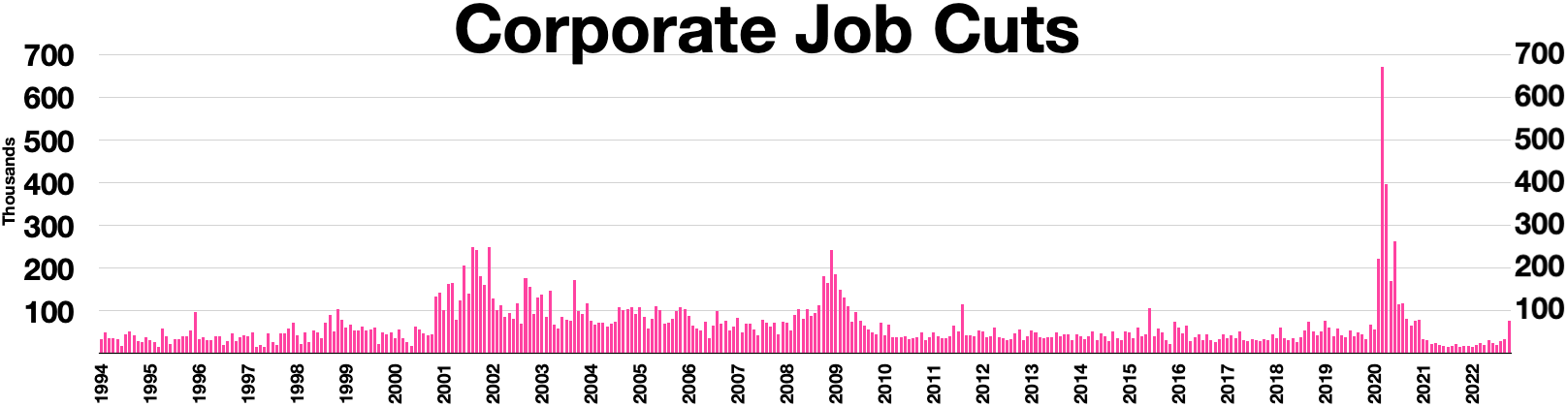
Corporate job cuts

The media has covered the company extensively since the late-1970s. As the concept of lifetime employment started to come to an end in the 1980s and ‘90s, founder James Challenger was a critical voice in the national press on the responsibility of companies to help their former workers after a layoff. In 1993, Challenger founded the Challenger Layoff Report which publishes the number of job cuts announced by companies month-by-month.

== Exclusive research ==
Challenger's research on job cut announcements by US-based employers is used by economists on the labor market. It is regarded as an economic indicator.

The firm also conducts research on chief executive officer turnover.

The firm conducts regular surveys and issues reports on the state of the economy, employment, job-seeking, layoffs and executive compensation. It conducts one-off surveys on such subjects as workplace bullying, lost productivity due to the Super Bowl, working women and the impact of MeToo on the workplace.

The firm was cited by Fortune magazine in 2018 for its study on office romance in the age of Metoo.

Other research includes the cost of the 2007 "March Madness" on the productivity of US businesses, the flat rate of hiring seasonal workers in 2011, declining rate of teen employment in 2012, rising planned layoffs at the U.S. companies in 2013. The firm was once awarded $5 million federal contract from the US Navy's Chief of Naval Installations Milling, Tennessee, for professional, scientific and technical services.
