= John Sloss =

American film producer

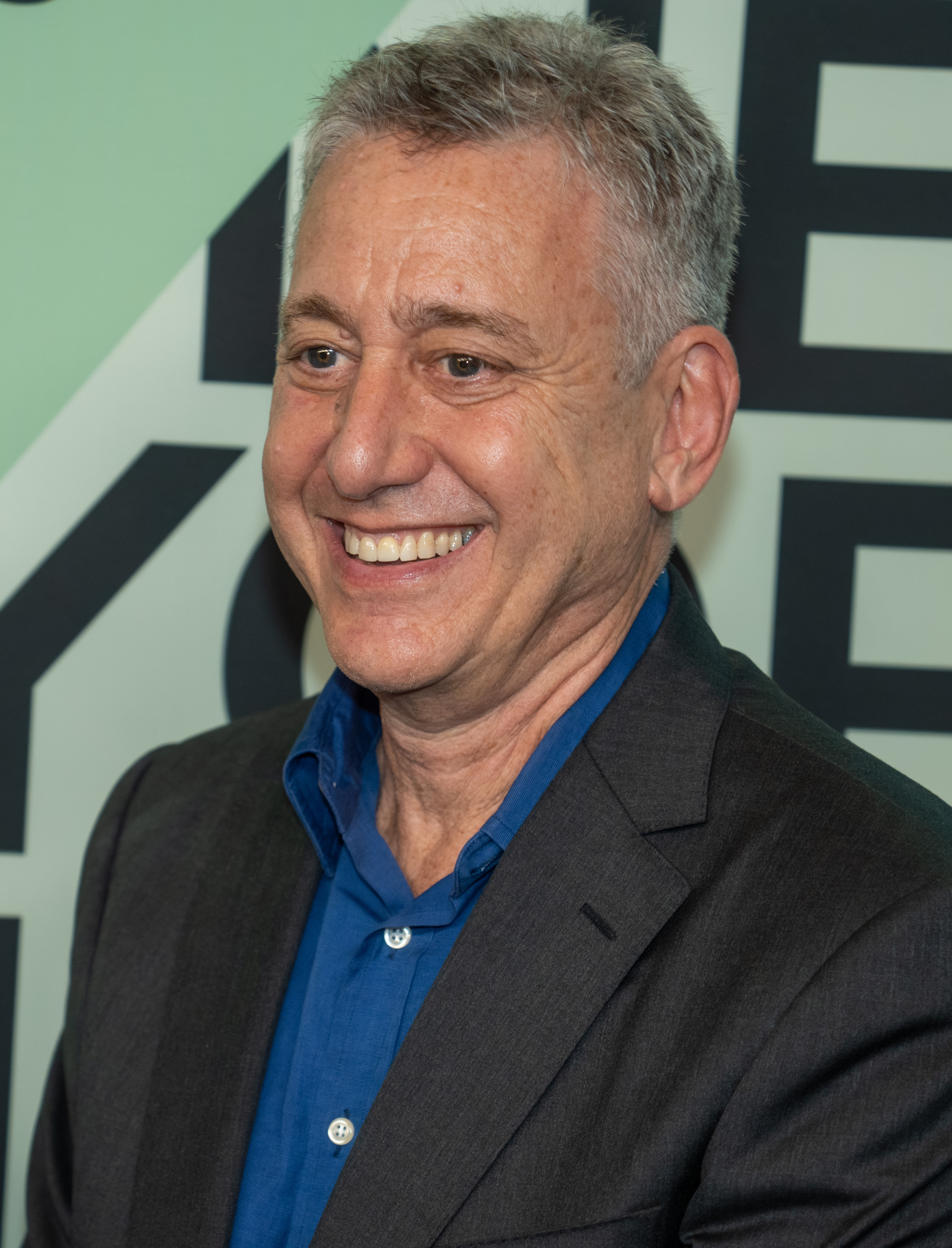
- Sloss in 2025
- Born: 1956 (age 69–70); Detroit, Michigan, United States
- Education: University of Michigan
- Occupations: Entertainment lawyer, sales agent, film producer, talent manager
- Years active: 1982–present

John Sloss (born 1956) is an American entertainment lawyer, film sales agent, and manager, who has produced or executive produced over 50 films including the Academy Award-winning The Fog of War, Boys Don't Cry and Boyhood. Other credits include Bernie, City of Hope, Friends with Kids, A Scanner Darkly, Far From Heaven, and Before Sunrise.

== Career ==
John Sloss was born to Richard and Marjory Sloss of Rochester, he spent his childhood in Michigan. He got a Juris Doctor degree from the University of Michigan and got a job at a big Wall Street company. Later, he became a partner at a boutique entertainment firm. After an accidental meeting with filmmaker John Sayles, he became his lawyer and producing partner. This partnership brought Sloss to establish his own practice, in 1993 he opened an office in New York. In the 1990s and 2000s, Sloss did legal work for Richard Linklater, Kevin Smith, Whit Stillman, Todd Haynes, Jared Hess, Morgan Spurlock, John Sayles, Victor Nunez, and many others. He became famous for brokering deals for modestly budgeted movies which often became critical and commercial hits. Already in 1998, at Sundance, Sloss negotiated the festival’s biggest sale: Next Stop Wonderland by Brad Anderson, which Miramax acquired for almost $6 million. His other sales included Napoleon Dynamite, Super Size Me, Little Miss Sunshine, Precious, The Kids Are All Right, and many more.

In 2000, Sloss co-founded InDigEnt, a digital production company. In 2001, Sloss founded Cinetic Media, a New York based film finance, distribution and sales label. In 2016, Cinetic opened a management division in Los Angeles.

Among his other businesses are Filmbuff, a digital distribution company founded in 2009, the Producers Distribution Agency, which released the films Banksy's Exit Through the Gift Shop, Senna, The Way, and Brooklyn Castle.

He is a member of the Board of Directors of Film at Lincoln Center and serves on the Finance Committee of the Academy of Motion Picture Arts and Sciences. Sloss has also served as an adjunct professor in the Graduate film program at Tisch School of the Arts at New York University.

As of 2023, Sloss is referred to as indie filmdom’s foremost deal-maker. Through his companies, he has facilitated the sale or financing of over 300 indie films.

== Family ==
In 2002, Sloss married Kathryn Tucker, an actress and producer for SenArt Films.

John Sloss and fashion curator and historian Bronwyn Cosgrave were married in New York on November 6, 2020.
