= Prologue and Tale of Beryn =

Spurious fifteenth century additions to Chaucer's Canterbury Tales

The Prologue and Tale of Beryn are spurious fifteenth century additions to Geoffrey Chaucer's Canterbury Tales. They are both written in Middle English.

== Prologue to the Tale of Beryn ==
The Prologue to the Tale of Beryn begins upon the pilgrims’ arrival in Canterbury, where they lodge at the inn, "The Checker of the Hoop." (1–12). While the company is dining at the inn, the Pardoner, disgusted with how the meal is served according to social hierarchy, leaves the fellowship to instead speak with the barmaid, Kit (13–22). After giving the barmaid his staff, Kit shows the Pardoner where she sleeps, "al naked," complaining that she has no lover because hers has died (23–39). The Pardoner tells Kit not to stay loyal to her dead lover (40–59). Feigning flirtation, Kit attempts to make the Pardoner break his fast from alcoholic beverages (a customary practice for pilgrims before reaching a shrine). The Pardoner gives Kit money, calling her his treasurer, but refuses to break his fast (60–98). Kit describes a contrived dream to the Pardoner, who says it foretells her future marriage to a loving husband. He then leaves her, promising to return soon (99–118). Through an interjection by the narrator we learn that both Kit and the Pardoner are aware of each other's ulterior motives, but each is confident that he or she can outsmart the other (119–129).

Later, the company visits the shrine of St. Thomas Becket, where a monk of Canterbury sprinkles their heads with holy water. Within the cathedral, the Pardoner, the Miller, and other members argue about what scenes are depicted on the stained glass windows. Harry Bailly, the Host, scolds them for their bickering and they all pray to St. Thomas, then buy souvenirs of the pilgrimage, except for the Miller and the Pardoner, who steal their souvenirs (145–174). The Summoner asks for half of what they have stolen, but the Miller is worried that the Friar will find out what they are doing and plots the ways in which he will "quyte" (repay) him on the return journey (175–190). The company then breaks their fast by indulging in drink while the Host congratulates them on a successful first half of the tale-telling competition. The Host suggests that they spend the day in pleasure, but to rise early the next morning for the return journey to Southwark (191–230). Following the Host's suggestion, the fellowship breaks into smaller groups: the Knight, the love-sick Squire and the Yeoman survey the town's defences; the Clerk advises the Summoner not to be offended by the tale the Friar has already told; the Monk, the Parson, and the Friar have drinks with an old friend of the Monk's; the Wife of Bath and the Prioress drink wine and talk in a garden; the Merchant, the Manciple, the Miller, the Reeve, and the Clerk go into the town (231–297).

The Pardoner stays behind at the inn with the intention of sleeping with Kit. The narrator assures the reader that the Pardoner would be better off sleeping in a bog than with the barmaid. That night, the Pardoner goes to Kit's room where she feigns sleep. The Pardoner apologises for frightening Kit, who tells him to return after everyone is asleep. The Pardoner leaves, falsely assured that he will bed Kit (298–378).

That night the Pardoner again notes how the Host serves the Knight and the prelates before the lower ranking members. After the meal, the Miller and the Cook continue drinking, and at the suggestion of the Pardoner, sing loudly, inciting reprimand from The Summoner, the Yeoman, the Manciple and the Reeve. At the request of the Host and the Merchant, they all sleep, except for the Pardoner (388–425). Meanwhile, Kit, her paramour, and the innkeeper have been dining on goose and wine bought with the Pardoner's money. Kit explains how she has tricked the Pardoner and her paramour promises to beat the Pardoner with his own staff. (426–466).

Upon entering Kit's room, the Pardoner angrily finds Kit in bed with her paramour. The paramour attacks the Pardoner, yelling to the innkeeper that there is a thief in his inn. The Pardoner, armed with pan and ladle, hits the paramour on the nose, (which, as the narrator tells us, causes the man to experience chronic nasal problems for a week after the encounter). With the kitchen pan, the Pardoner injures the innkeeper's shin (which later becomes infected). Kit is the only one to escape unscathed. The paramour and the innkeeper, unable to find the Pardoner, decide to resume their search in the morning. Although the Pardoner is physically injured, the greatest wounds are to his pride. As the Pardoner attempts to return his room, he is attacked by a guard dog, which causes him to spend the night in the dog's litter (while the dog takes his bed), immobile for fear, regretting his attempt to bed with Kit (467–655). The next morning, the Pardoner hides his injuries and leaves with the rest of the company, who continue their game with the second tale of the Merchant, the Tale of Beryn (656–732).

== The Tale of Beryn ==
The Tale of Beryn is the first tale told on the journey back to the Tabard Inn in Southwark. Told by the Merchant, it is a long tale of 3,290 lines. Its portrayal of merchants in a positive (or at least neutral) light make it peculiar in the Middle Ages. Beryn is the son of Faunus and Agea, a wealthy couple in Rome. Beryn's parents do not discipline him as a child, but instead allow him to gamble as much as he desires. Beryn frequently gambles away all of his possessions, including the shirt on his back. When Agea dies, Faunus swears to never marry again, but after three years of living without a wife, the Emperor of Rome changes Faunus' mind. Now eighteen, Beryn has continued to gamble, but his new stepmother Rame disapproves of the lack of discipline with which Agea and Faunus have raised Beryn. Rame makes Faunus talk to Beryn about correcting his gambling habit. Full of foolish pride, Beryn fights with his father. Beryn then visits his mother's grave, where his father finds him to offer him knighthood. Beryn rejects the offer preferring instead to leave Rome in attempt to find his fortune in Egypt. Before arriving, his ship is blown off course to an unknown land. In this land, all law is decided via lawsuits and a clever lie is more valuable than truth. Here Beryn decides to gamble on a game of chess, resulting in a complete loss of his possessions. Beryn is then falsely accused of being someone else, stealing a blind man's eyes, and impregnating someone's daughter. He is then sued by his accusers, but since the truth is not a legitimate defence in the land's court, Beryn's accusers seem to be undefeatable. That is until a jester named Geoffrey comes to Beryn's aid by telling better lies about the prosecution, than those told about Beryn. Due to Geoffrey's clever lies, the court rules in Beryn's favour and his gambled possessions are returned.

== The text ==
The Northumberland MS 455 (fols. 180a-235a), dated c. 1450–70 is the only manuscript containing the Canterbury Interlude and The Tale of Beryn. The Canterbury Interlude and the Tale of Beryn were published along with the other tales in John Urry’s 1721 edition of The Canterbury Tales. Because it is the only manuscript containing these tales, it is difficult to judge what is scribal error and what is the original text. For this reason, modern scholars must analyse the text of The Canterbury Interlude and The Tale of Beryn against other tales copied by the same scribe in the same manuscript (specifically The Canon's Yeoman's Tale and The Summoner's Tale) to ascertain scribal anomalies.

== Sources ==
The Tale of Beryn is an adaptation of the French Romance Berinus, written in the mid-fourteenth century. In Berinus, the protagonist is the gambling degenerate of The Tale of Beryn. In earlier versions of the tale, this is not the case. Berinus itself derives from the Seven Sages of Rome. The Seven Sages of Rome is adapted from the Indian work, the Book of Sindibad, composed in Sanskrit as early as 500 BC. The Book of Sindibad is quite similar to the Tale of Beryn; it features a young merchant whose father – also a merchant – has just died. Despite the prior warning of his father, the young merchant travels to the Himalayan region. Upon his arrival he is accused of killing a man's father, and two other claimants demand money from him; one claims that the merchant's father bought his eye, and the other claims that she is owed child support. They all go to court, but the prince of the region, who was friends with the merchant's father, instructs the young merchant how to trick the people out of their lawsuits. The Arabian version of the tale, "The Merchant and the Rogues," has less in common with the Tale of Beryn, and although it may not actually be one of the tale's sources, it does concern a corrupt ruler who tries to trick strangers in his land with riddles. The stranger in the tale, with the help of an old woman, solves the king's riddles. Unlike the Tale of Beryn, the protagonist is "an idealized model student," not a gambler.

== Representative critical analyses ==
In the article, "From Southwark's Tabard Inn to Canterbury's Cheker-Of-the Hope: the Un-Chaucerian Tale of Beryn," Jean E. Jost postulates that the courtly love tradition as seen in The Canterbury Tales is absent in "The Tale of Beryn." To demonstrate this claim, Jost's essay examines the courtly tradition, the prologue, the tale itself, including the characters, and also the tale's "poetic proficiency" as a way of demonstrating the differences between the original The Canterbury Tales and un-Chaucerian poet's "Tale of Beryn" (133). Jost argues that the tale lacks the sophisticated rhythm and rhyme scheme of Chaucer's tales, and instead is full of repetitious and uninspired language.

Stephen Harper, in an article entitled "’Pleying with a ȝerd’: Folly and Madness in the Prologue and Tale of Beryn," suggesting that folly is a central theme within the work of the unknown "Beryn-writer." Harper's work considers various representations of fools in both tale and Prologue, not only examining the literary value of fool imagery, but using that imagery to evidence the artistic prowess of the Beryn poet. In addition to examining the fool imagery present in both the Prologue and tale, Harper also briefly discusses madness as a mechanism for moral reversal.

In "Journey's End: The Prologue to the Tale of Beryn," Peter Brown examines the probable origins of The Tale of Beryn – spending most of his efforts on discerning its author. He, like most critics, dismisses the possibility of the text being penned by Chaucer. Brown writes that the author is probably a monk from either Canterbury or one of the other nearby "monastic institutions" – a conclusion reasoned by the author's treatment of monks and his knowledge of pilgrims' practices. The Tale of Beyrn is said to be one of the great examples of English fabliaux with a descriptive realism that "reveals as much about medieval Canterbury as The Miller’s Tale does about Oxford" or the Reeve's does about Cambridge. Brown claims the author is one of the earliest examples of an English author feeling the "anxiety of influence," in that the author feels a "sense of being indebted to, yet needing to escape from, the work of the earlier English writer" (165).

Frederick B. Jonassen in his article "Cathedral, Inn and Pardoner in the Prologue to the Tale of Beryn" presents a critique of the Canterbury Interlude which focuses on its relation both to The Canterbury Tales as a whole and to The Pardoner's Tale specifically. Jonassen begins by positing that the Pardoner's encounter with Kitt is a fabliau which closely models the Miller's Tale. Jonassen then draws parallels relating the relationships between the Pardoner and Kitt, and between the characters of other Chaucer tales. Jonassen argument finds the greatest strength of the Beryn author stemming from his Chaucerian-like juxtaposition of 'solaas' and 'sentence' throughout the tales, as well as his emphasis on the dichotomy between the high and the low. Jonassen argues that the main difference in the Beryn author's "Interlude" and Chaucer's tales rests in its harmless presentation of the Pardoner. The Beryn author makes the tale a light fabliau rather than a tale detailing sin to "emphasize the foolishness of the Pardoner to the exclusion of the sinister moral threat of misleading the pilgrims he poses."

== Critical editions ==
- Bowers, John M., ed. (1992). The Canterbury Tales: Fifteenth-Century Continuations and Additions. Kalamazoo, Michigan: Medieval Institute Publications.
- Tamanini, Mary E. Mulqueen, ed. (1969). The Tale of Beryn: an Edition with Introduction, Notes, and Glossary. New York: New York University Press.
- Furnivall, F. J. and W. G. Stone, eds. (1909). The Tale of Beryn with A Prologue of the Merry Adventure of the Pardoner with a Tapster at Canterbury. Oxford, UK: Early English Text Society.
