= The Canterbury Tales (film) =

1972 Italian-French film by Pier Paolo Pasolini

- Directed by: Pier Paolo Pasolini
- Written by: Pier Paolo Pasolini
- Based on: The Canterbury Tales by Geoffrey Chaucer
- Produced by: Alberto Grimaldi
- Starring: Hugh Griffith; Laura Betti; Ninetto Davoli; Franco Citti; Josephine Chaplin; Alan Webb; Jenny Runacre; John Francis Lane; Athol Coats; Tom Baker; Oscar Fochetti; Robin Askwith
- Cinematography: Tonino Delli Colli
- Edited by: Nino Baragli
- Music by: Ennio Morricone, Carl Hardebeck (uncredited)
- Production companies: Les Productions Artistes Associés; Produzioni Europee Associate
- Distributed by: United Artists Europa Inc.
- Release dates: 2 July 1972 (Berlinale); 2 September 1972 (Italy)
- Running time: 122 minutes
- Countries: Italy; France
- Languages: Italian; English; Latin; Scottish Gaelic

The Canterbury Tales (Italian: I racconti di Canterbury) is a 1972 Italian-French medieval erotic black comedy anthology film directed by Pier Paolo Pasolini based on the medieval narrative poem by Geoffrey Chaucer. The second film in Pasolini's "Trilogy of Life", preceded by The Decameron and followed by Arabian Nights, it won the Golden Bear at the 22nd Berlin International Film Festival.

With the "Trilogy of Life", Pasolini sought to adapt vibrant, erotic and scatological tales from classical literature. With The Decameron, Pasolini adapted an important work from the early era of the Italian language. With The Canterbury Tales, he turned to the earthy and bawdy Middle English tales of Chaucer.

Pasolini considered the film to be among his most "ideological".

== Overview ==
The adaptation covers eight of the 24 tales and contains abundant nudity, sex, toilet humour and slapstick. Many of these scenes are present or at least alluded to in the original as well, but some are Pasolini's own additions.

The film sometimes diverges from Chaucer. For example, "The Friar's Tale" is significantly expanded upon: where the Friar leads in with a general account of the archdeacon's severity and the summoner's corruption, Pasolini illustrates this with a specific incident which has no parallel in Chaucer. After two men are caught having sex at a local inn, one is able to bribe his way out of trouble, but the other, poorer man is less fortunate: he is convicted of sodomy and sentenced to death. As a foretaste of Hell, he is burned alive inside an iron cage ("roasted on a griddle" in the words of one spectator) while vendors sell roasted foods to the spectators. Likewise, "The Cook's Tale" which is 58 lines is turned into a slapstick farce to give Ninetto Davoli a starring role.

== Plot ==
Set in England during the Middle Ages, stories of peasants, noblemen, clergy and demons are interwoven with brief scenes from Chaucer's home life and experiences implied to be the basis for the Canterbury Tales. Each episode does not take the form of a story told by different pilgrim, as is the case in Chaucer's stories, but simply appear in sequence, seemingly without regard for the way that the tales relate to one another in the original text. All the stories are linked to the arrival of a group of pilgrims at Canterbury, among whom is the poet Geoffrey Chaucer, played by Pasolini himself.

Prologue (General Prologue): The film credits roll as the traditional ballad Ould Piper plays over top, about an elderly piper from Ballymoney who dies and is sent to Hell where he annoys the Devil with his terrible singing. The characters from the later stories are introduced chattering to one another at the Tabard inn. Chaucer (played by Pasolini himself) enters through the gate and bumps into a heavy man covered in woad tattooing, injuring his nose. The wife of Bath delivers long-winded monologues to uninterested listeners about her weaving skills and sexual prowess. The Pardoner unsuccessfully attempts to sell what he claims are pieces of cloth from the sail of St. Peter's boat and the Virgin's veil. Some other travelers enter and suggest they tell stories to make the journey more entertaining which leads into the main stories of the film. Chaucer opens his book and begins to write down their stories.

First Tale (The Merchant's Tale): The elderly merchant Sir January decides to marry May, a young woman who has little interest in him. After they are married, the merchant suddenly becomes blind, and insists on constantly holding on to his wife's wrist as consolation for the fact that he cannot see her. Meanwhile, Damian, a young man whom May has interest in, decides to take advantage of the situation. May has a key to January's personal garden made. While the two are walking in the private garden, May asks to eat mulberries from one of the trees. Taking advantage of her husband's blindness, she meets with Damian inside of the tree, but is thwarted when the god Pluto, who has been watching over the couple in the garden, suddenly restores January's sight. January briefly sees May and her lover together and is furious. Fortunately for May, the goddess Persephone who also happens to be in the same garden fills her head with decent excuses to calm her husband's wrath. May convinces January that he has hallucinated and the two walk off together merrily.

Second Tale (The Friar's Tale): A vendor witnesses a summoner who is spying on two different men having sex. He catches both and turns them over to the authorities. While one man manages to escape prosecution by bribing the authorities and the other is sentenced to burn on a "griddle" for sodomy. During his execution, the vendor walks through the crowd selling griddle cakes. Afterwards, the vendor meets the summoner, who is unaware he was being followed. The two vow to be friends but the vendor reveals himself to be the devil. The summoner does not care about this and says they will make great partners as they are both out for profit. The summoner then explains that he must collect money from a miserly old woman. When they meet the old woman, the summoner levies false charges against her and tells her that she must appear before the ecclesiastical court but says that if she pays him a bribe in the amount she owes, she will be excused. The elderly woman accuses him of lying, and curses him to be taken away by the devil if he does not repent. She says the devil can take him and the pitcher she owns which is her most valuable possession. The devil asks her if she truly means what she says and she assents. The summoner refuses to repent and the devil proceeds to take him (and the pitcher) to hell as they are now his by divine right.

Third Tale (The Cook's Tale): The travelers at the Tabard Inn have all fallen asleep save for Chaucer. He begins to jot down more of their tales starting with the Cook's Tale.

Perkin, a Charlie Chaplin-esque fool who carries a cane and wears a kettle hat, steals food from bystanders and causes havoc. He is chased by the police who he escapes from by ducking out of the way while they trip into the Thames River. Perkin crashes a wedding where he steals the attention of the bride and smashes a wedding cake into the face of the feckless husband. This enrages the father-in-law who throws him out. Perkin goes home where he is scolded by his midget father. His mother is more sympathetic and steals food for him. She hopes he will find work tomorrow. Perkin next finds work polishing eggs. While his employer is away, Perkin is distracted by a group of men playing a dice game nearby and joins them. He steals money from his employer to use but is soon discovered and fired. Perkin accompanies one of the men home, where he shares a bed with the man and his wife, who is a prostitute. That night, he dreams he is dancing with naked women in a similar manner to how the party guests were dancing at the wedding he had previously crashed. Two police officers who Perkin evaded earlier discover him there and awaken him. Perkin is arrested and put in the stocks where he drunkenly sings The Ould Piper while bystanders and minstrels cheer and shout.

Fourth Tale (The Miller's Tale): Chaucer reads a funny story from The Decameron. His wife scolds him for wasting time so he sits down to write his own story. This is the Miller's Tale.

Nicholas, a young student, lives next door to an overweight, elderly carpenter named John. He notices that John has left for Osney, so he goes next door to seduce John's much younger, unfaithful wife Alison, who secretly detests John. Absolon, another youth, also has a crush on Alison. He and his homosexual friend Martin go to Alison later and serenade her with the ballad The Gower Wassail much to her and her now returned husband's chagrin. In order to deceive John, Nicholas pretends to be in a holy trance. When John enters the room to see what is wrong, Nicholas convinces him that a massive flood is about to occur, and claims that he, John and Alison should all three wait in buckets tied to the ceiling rafters to escape drowning. John does as he says and they hide in the buckets. While John waits in his bucket, he drifts off to sleep. Nicholas and Alison come out of their buckets and sneak away to have sex. Meanwhile, Absolon arrives, but Alison scolds him and tells him that she is not attracted to him. He accepts, but asks only for a kiss. Alison answers him by inviting him to climb up to her window and then when he puckers his lips, she tricks him into kissing her buttocks by sticking it out the window and he doesn't realise it, until she farts in his face. Absolon is offended, so he runs to a blacksmith's shop, where he borrows a fireplace poker, and then returns to John's house to ask for another kiss. On this occasion, Nicholas sticks his buttocks out the window, instead of Alison, and has it scalded soon after he also farts in Absolon's face. Nicholas then cries out for water, leading John to awaken and believe that the flood has arrived. John then cuts the rope holding his bucket in the air, and he violently falls to the ground, which causes him to break his arm.

Fifth Tale (The Wife of Bath's Tale): In Bath, Alice is a lustful middle-aged woman whose fourth husband falls ill during sex and dies soon after. Alice meets a young student named Jenkin and is instantly smitten by him after watching him bathing. Her friend who is lodging the student sets up for her to meet Jenkin alone during an 'Obby 'Oss festival that is coming up. At the celebration, Alice gets Jenkin alone and gives him a handjob. She tells him that he must marry her because she had a prophetic dream that he was trying to kill her and that she was covered in blood. Blood means gold. She buries her husband and marries Jenkin in quick succession, literally running from her late husband's funeral in one wing of a cathedral to her wedding in another wing. On their wedding night, Alice's fifth husband reads to her from a book denouncing the evils of historical women such as Eve and Xanthippe. Alice demands that he not tell her about her own business, and destroys the book. Her husband pushes her away, and she falls onto her back and moans on the floor. She feigns injury and tells him that she is dying. She curses him for plotting to take her land and inheritance. When he leans over to comfort her, however, she bites his nose. This episode is derived from the prologue to the Wife of Bath's Tale rather than the tale itself.

Sixth Tale (The Reeve's Tale): In Cambridge, a manciple falls ill and is unable to perform his duties so two students named Alan and John are tasked with performing them for him. They bring a sack of grain to a mill to be milled into flour. Simkin the Miller tricks the youths by freeing their horse and switching their flour for bran while they chase after it. When they return with the horse, it is late in the evening, and the students ask to stay the night. The Miller agrees to let them stay, and the two share a pallet bed next to one shared by the Miller and his wife. During the night, Alan seduces Molly, the Miller's daughter, being careful not to wake the Miller. John is angered by this as he is left alone and feels foolish. The Miller's wife, meanwhile, gets up to urinate, and stumbles over the crib at the foot of her and the Miller's pallet. John gets an idea and before she returns, he moves the crib to the foot of his own pallet, tricking the miller's wife into sleeping with him instead of the Miller. Alan finishes having sex with Molly, and she confesses that she and father have stolen his flour. Alan then gets into bed with the Miller and tells him about his exploits with Molly, thinking that the Miller is his companion. The Miller then attacks the scholar, causing his wife and John to come to the scholar's defense in the dark room and knock him out. The scholars then ride away with their flour as Molly forlornly says farewell.

Seventh Tale (The Pardoner's Tale): Chaucer sits down to write another story. He has a very focused look on his face.

In Flanders, four young men spend their time carousing in a brothel that is full of prostitutes who specialize in BDSM and cleaning smegma. One of the boys, Rufus, is drunk and yells at the other customers for their immorality before urinating on them. The next day, Rufus is killed by a thief. The other boys hear about this and misunderstand the news they are told. They believe Rufus was literally murdered by a man named Death. They agree to seek out Death for themselves and get revenge on him for murdering their friend. The youths then encounter an old man, who they accuse of conspiring with Death in order to kill the young, and demand at knifepoint that he tell them where Death is located. The old man tells them to look around a nearby oak tree, where they find instead an abundance of treasure. While two of the youths wait by the treasure, a third (Dick the Sparrow) leaves for town, returning later with three casks of wine, two of which he has poisoned. When he reaches the tree, the two youths drink the poisoned wine and stab their companion, then succumb to the poison.

Eighth Tale (The Summoner's Tale): In the final tale, a gluttonous friar tries to extract as many donations as possible from a bedridden parishioner. The parishioner then offers him his most valuable possession, provided he promises to distribute it equally among all the friars. The parishioner claims that this possession is located beneath his buttocks. When the friar reaches down to retrieve the item, the bedridden man farts into his hands. That night, an angel visits the friar and brings him to hell, where Satan expels hundreds of corrupt friars from his rectum. This segment with Satan defecating corrupt friars out of him is from the Summoner's prologue rather than the main tale.

Epilogue (Chaucer's Retraction): The film ends with the pilgrims arriving at Canterbury Cathedral, and Chaucer at home writing (in transl.) "Here ends the Canterbury Tales, told only for the pleasure of telling them. Amen": a line original to the film. The brief scene differs starkly from the original text. While the real Chaucer asked his Christian readers to forgive the more immoral and unsavoury aspects of his book, Pasolini's Chaucer is unashamed of sexuality and pleased to tell these ribald and raunchy tales.

== Cast ==
- Hugh Griffith as Sir January
- Laura Betti as Alice, the Wife of Bath
- Ninetto Davoli as Perkin
- Franco Citti as The Devil
- Josephine Chaplin as May
- Alan Webb as Old Man
- Pier Paolo Pasolini as Geoffrey Chaucer
- Jenny Runacre as Alison
- Orla Pederson (credited as OT) as Chief Witch-Hunter
- George Datch as Host of the Tabard
- Dan Thomas as Nicholas
- Peter Cain as Absolom
- Daniele Buckler as Witch-Hunter
- John Francis Lane as The Friar
- Settimio Castagna as The Angel
- Athol Coats as The Rich Homosexual
- Judy Stewart-Murray as Alice
- Oscar Fochetti as Damian
- Martin Whelar as Jack the Justice
- John McLaren as Johnny the Grace
- Edward Monteith as Dick the Sparrow
- Tom Baker as Jenkin
- Robin Askwith (credited as Robin Asquith) as Rufus
- Michael Balfour as John the Carpenter
- Vernon Dobtcheff as The Franklin
- Derek Deadman (credited as Derek Deadmin) as The Pardoner
- Adrian Street as Fighter
- Nicholas Smith as Friar
- J.P. van Dyne as The Cook
- Willoughby Goddard as Placebo
- Peter Stephens as Justinus
- Giuseppe Arrigio as Pluto
- Elisabetta Genovese as Prosperine
- Gordon King as The Chancellor
- Patrick Duffett as Alan
- Eamann Howell as John
- Albert King (Tiziano Longo) as Simkin the Miller
- Eileen King as Simkin's wife
- Heather Johnson as Molly
- Kervin Breen (credited as Kervin)
- Franca Sciutto
- Vittorio Fanfoni
- Eduardo De Filippo - voice of the old man in the Pardoner's tale (Italian dub)
- Francesco Leonetti - voice of Tabard inn host (Italian dub)
- Winni Riva - voice of Mabel, the old woman with the pitcher in the Friar's Tale (Italian dub)
- Marco Bellocchio - voice of greedy friar in the Summoner's Tale (Italian dub)

== Production ==
Production lasted from September 16 to November 23, 1971. Pier Paolo Pasolini was very unhappy during the production of this film as Ninetto Davoli was in the process of leaving him to marry a woman.

=== Cinematography ===
The cinematography of this film is based on medieval and Renaissance paintings. The shots of Chaucer at work in his study are based on the painting of Saint Jerome in His Study by Antonello da Messina. The background here is changed from open spaces and rolling hills to large bookcases and small windows showing only empty white. This was to show the cramped spaces in which Chaucer worked. The depiction of Hell at the very end of the film is also based on the paintings of Hieronymus Bosch. Giotto di Bondone and Peter Bruegel also served as visual references.

=== Casting ===
Atypical of a Pasolini film, he chose some of the finest Welsh and American actors such as Hugh Griffith and Josephine Chaplin. This has probably the most famous cast of a Pasolini film. However, in other roles he also chose unknown actors from off the London streets and back alleys. According to Mimmo Cattarnich who worked as the scenery photographer on the film, fights would often break out among the non-professional actors on set with knives and clubs.

This film also uses Pasolini regulars such as Ninetto Davoli and Franco Citti. Franco Citti plays the Devil in this film which follows a theme in The Trilogy of Life of Citti playing demonic and immoral characters (he plays Ser Ciappelletto in The Decameron and is an ifrit in Arabian Nights).

=== Dubbing ===
The film was shot in England, and all the dialogue was filmed in English, which Pasolini considered the primary language of the film. No live sound was recorded, and so English and Italian dialogue were both dubbed over the film afterwards. For written scenes in the film, both Italian and English-language shots were filmed. In the Italian version, the dubbing is done by actors from Lombardy. Pasolini made this choice because in Italy, the Lombard accent is considered prim and sophisticated making it a suitable stand-in for English accents. Pasolini chose actors from the outskirts on the edge of Bergamo because he considered the pure Lombard accent tainted by writers such as Giovanni Testori. Most of the voice actors were illiterate so Pasolini would have to actually tell them what to say. Neither version uses the original Chaucerian English. For this movie's script, Pasolini used a modern colloquial English adaptation of the original Middle English which was then translated into Italian. This has been described by film commentator Sam Rohdie as "like Chaucerian English but not Chaucerian English".

=== Locations ===
The following locations were used as settings for the tales:

- St. John's College, Cambridge, Cambridgeshire - where Alan and John are scholars and their manciple falls ill.
- Canterbury Cathedral, Canterbury, Kent - cathedral appears at the end. The travelers have reached their destination.
- Chipping Campden, Gloucestershire - the setting of the three young men who search for Death.
- St Thomas á Becket Church, Fairfield, Romney Marsh, Kent - where the three young men ask the old man where to find death. He points to a collection of gold behind a nearby tree.
- Lavenham Guildhall, Lavenham, Suffolk - home of the Wife of Bath.
- Layer Marney Tower, Essex - where Perkin the Reveler is put in the stockade.
- St Osyth Priory, Essex - Sir January's large estate and private garden.
- Battle Abbey, Battle, Sussex - the interior of Sir January's castle.
- John Webb's Windmill, Thaxted, Essex - home of the elderly widow in the Friar's Tale where the devil takes the summoner and the pitcher down to Hell with him.
- Warwick, Warwickshire
- Vicars' Close, Wells, Wells, Somerset - May's original home before marrying Sir January and the street where January inspects the behinds of young women.
- Mount Etna, Sicily - Hell in the Summoner's Tale and also where the deleted Tale of Sir Topas was filmed.
- Coggeshall Grange Barn, Grange Hill, Coggeshall, Essex - The Tabard Inn, also the brothel in the Pardoner's Tale.
- Great Hall of Winchester Palace, Southwark - the bread line where Perkin attempts to steal extra rations.
- Factories of the Shad Thames where Perkin is chased by two bumbling constables.
- The Old Stairs at Wapping - constables and the monk fall into the River Thames.
- Wells Cathedral, Wells, Somerset - Absolon attends a dance here, and the Wife of Bath marries the young student in the Lady Chapel.
- Trinity Lane, alongside Trinity College, Cambridge, Cambridgeshire - Absolon and Martin run to Alison's house through this street. Master Gervase has his blacksmith shop here.
- Rolvenden Windmill, Kent - Mill and home of Simkin the Miller and his family, and is also the location of the festival where the wife of Bath gives a handjob to Jenkin.
- Safa-Palatino, Rome, Lazio, Italy - miscellaneous interior scenes
- Bradford-on-Avon, Wiltshire - Chaucer sets up his tale of Sir Thopas and the Host and other travellers ask him to stop (deleted scene).
- The George Inn, Norton St Philip, Somerset – home of Alison, John the Carpenter and their neighbor Nicholas.

=== Anachronisms ===
The film commentator Colin MacCabe wrote that with this film Pasolini was "not aiming for an accurate representation of the time but a modern re-creation of its spirit". The film attempts to capture a quintessentially English atmosphere though it also is the cause of some anachronisms. Most of the traditional ballads sung throughout the film are from the 19th and 20th centuries. Molly in the Reeve's Tale and the naked women in Perkin's dream also have very noticeable tan lines from bikinis. The opposite is also in effect for the man who bumps into Pasolini's Chaucer in the opening of the film. He is covered in woad tattooing though the custom died out in the British Isles before the Roman Empire's existence.

The appearance of Chaucer's wife Philippa Roet in one of the interlude scenes is also anachronistic as she was already long dead by the time Chaucer began writing The Canterbury Tales.

== Reception ==
In a 2018 essay for the Criterion Collection, critic Patricia White described the film as conventionally regarded as the weakest part of the "Trilogy of Life," noting that critics have contrasted it unfavourably with the "ebullience" of The Decameron (1971) and Arabian Nights (1974).

Despite this, the film won the Golden Bear at the 22nd Berlin International Film Festival in 1972. In its own retrospective account of the festival, Berlinale describes the award as having been regarded by some at the time as a "stopgap measure" amid a weak competition lineup that year.

The film's sexual content also drew legal scrutiny in Italy because of its visual realism. In October 1972, a court in Naples ordered its seizure, and Pasolini was prosecuted on charges of obscenity and defamation of religion, resulting in his acquittal in February 1973.

== Deleted scenes ==
Pasolini shot, edited and dubbed a version of the Tale of Sir Thopas that was later removed from the film and lost. This scene was shot at Mt. Etna in Sicily. In the deleted scene, the Host of the Tabard berates Chaucer for not being more lively and telling a tale of his own to the other guests. Chaucer looks down at his shoes and then tells his tale, the tale of Sir Thopas. In the story, Thopas is a gallant knight from Flanders who one day gets an erection after being visited in his dream by the Queen of Fairies. He next comes across the wicked Sir Elephant, who insults and challenges him, but he runs away during the middle of the challenge and is pelted in the head with rocks. He then returns to his own castle where he is doted on by his servants and makes ready for the fight. The host abruptly cuts his story off here as he is bored. This angers Chaucer who returns home to write down the tales in peace. The shots of Chaucer at home are left in the film but this crucial exposition is removed, making the jump from Chaucer at the Tabard to Chaucer writing at home a bit odd. Other exposition segments were also removed from the original script and the tales were rearranged in a different order. Besides the cut tale of Sir Thopas, 20 other scenes in addition were removed. Laura Betti claimed that in total 40 minutes of film was removed because of the runtime. The other scenes removed included:

- A group of secondary characters that stop at the Tabard Inn midway through the film.
- Chaucer interacting with characters in the opening prologue.
- Chaucer bumps into both the Cook and the Merchant, injuring his nose. He delivers the line "Between a jest and a joke, many a truth is told" twice.
- The pardoner and summoner engaging in violent diatribes against one another.
- The miller setting up his story.
- The Reeve setting up his story after the miller is finished. This story depicts a miller as a cuckold to get back at the depiction of the carpenter in the previous tale.
- The drunken cook (played by eccentric South African tattoo artist J. P. van Dyne) sets up his story about Perkin the Reveler.
- The Wife of Bath delivers a monologue about her "instrument" that arouses the Pardoner.
- Scenes depicting all five of the Wife's husbands and the death of her most recent, much younger husband, with the line "May God save his soul from Hell. Now I await my sixth husband".
- The Merchant tells his tale of Sir January and May.
- The Friar tells his tale to offend the Summoner.
- The Summoner begins his tale. He states "Everyone here knows how friars are such frequent visitors to Hell.
- The Summoner's Tale was also much longer and included scenes of the Friar sexually harassing the dying Thomas' wife.
- The Pardoner delivers his tale. He begins with a rambling confession about his own avarice: "I preach against greed – the sin I commit every day".
- The tale ends with the Pardoner hocking his pardons for exorbitant prices after which the offended Host threats to castrate the Pardoner but the two eventually kiss and make up.

Pasolini also changed the order of these tales after removing the introduction scenes. In the original version, the tales proceeded as follows: The Miller's Tale > The Reeve's Tale > The Cook's Tale > Sir Thopas > The Wife of Bath's Tale > The Merchant's Tale > The Friar's Tale > The Summoner's Tale > The Pardoner's Tale.

== Score ==
The score is largely composed of folk songs from the British Isles. Many of them are bawdy suiting the ribaldry of the tales on screen. The songs used often reflect the themes of the stories in which they are used. For example, the Irish ballad Oxford City about a love triangle between a woman and two men that results in the spurned man getting revenge by poisoning the others parallels very closely the Miller's Tale. In the Reeve's Tale, Molly sings The Little Beggarman, about a beggar who goes from town to town sleeping with different women and then abandoning them in the morning which is exactly what Alan and John do to her and her mother in the story. Though the music is traditional English, Scottish and Irish music, much of it is heavily anachronistic to the time of Chaucer. Sir January sings the forebitter Paddy West though it was composed in 1951. The use of Camborne Hill is also quite unlikely for the period as it commemorates a locomotive. The following are the complete list of songs used by Pasolini in the film:

- The Ould Piper, composed by Carl Hardebeck - played over the main credits and sung frequently by Ninetto Davoli throughout The Cook's Tale.
- Jug of Punch - sang by the Cook after bumping into Chaucer.
- Camborne Hill - in the background during the Tabard Inn scenes and at the end of the film.
- The Farmer's Curst Wife - Sir January chooses May for his bride.
- Paddy West - sung by Sir January to May.
- The Coolin - played on flute by a sprite in Sir January's garden/ musical theme of Pluto and Persephone in the Merchant's Tale.
- Tramps and Hawkers - the blind Sir January sings this while taking May to Damian.
- Dairy Maid - when Perkin steals a pastry from a child.
- Bundle and Go - when Perkin attempts to steal extra rations from a breadline.
- The Wind Blew the Bonnies Lassie's Plaidie Awa' - when Perkin greets a wedding procession.
- The Wee Weaver - Perkin is yelled at by his father.
- Royal Forrester - Perkin looks for work.
- Behind the Bush in the Garden - Perkin is fired.
- Merry Haymakers - Perkin moves in with his friend and his prostitute wife.
- Torna Ma Goon - sung by John the Carpenter.
- Liverpool Packet - Absolon and Martin run through the street.
- Gower Wassail - Absolon and Martin serenade Alison.
- Oxford City - Nicholas the student tricks the carpenter, also used when Alan and John leave Molly and Simkin in The Reeve's Tale.
- Newlyn Town - Alison farts in Absolon's face after tricking him into kissing her buttocks, and is also used in the brothel scene in The Pardoner's Tale.
- The Brown Thorn - the wife of Bath meets Jenkin.
- Padstow Obby Oss song- the wife of Bath meets Jenkin at the festival.
- Our Wedding Day - the wife of Bath argues with Jenkin.
- Hal An Tow - Alan and John at Cambridge, also whistled by them at Simkin's mill.
- Campanero - sung by John at Simkin's mill.
- Little Beggarman - sung by Molly.
- Ailein duinn - sung by Molly while Alan and John search for their missing horse.
- The Mermaid - sung by Simkin's family at dinner, sung by Simkin's wife when she gets up to pee.
- Napoleon Bonaparte - in background when Dick buys poison with which to murder his friends in The Pardoner's Tale.

The Latin chant Veni Sancte Spiritus is also sung throughout the film, particularly the line "flecte quod est rigidum" which means "Soften that which is rigid". In the Miller's Tale, Nicholas sings it while he's thinking of Alison and later on, he, Alison and her cuckolded husband all sing the refrain while they are getting into the barrels to prepare for Noah's flood. Alan and John also sing this after leaving Simkin's wife and daughter in the Reeve's Tale. The Latin chant Haec Dies is also used in the Pardoner's Tale.

Some of the music was composed by Ennio Morricone on period accurate instruments. He said he did not enjoy working with bagpipes so the film was a bit challenging for him.

== Home video ==
The film was released by the Criterion Collection in a 3-BD box set Trilogy of Life.

== See also ==
- Hell in the arts and popular culture

== Notes ==
1.This scene likely references the fact that Chaucer based some of his stories on The Decameron, notably The Reeve's Tale.
