= The Friar's Tale =

Part of the Canterbury Tales

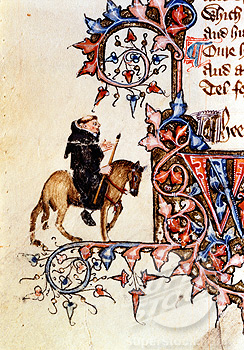
The Friar from the Ellesmere Manuscript of Chaucer’s The Canterbury Tales

"The Friar's Tale" (Middle English: The Freres Tale) is a story in The Canterbury Tales by Geoffrey Chaucer, told by Huberd the Friar. The story centers on a corrupt summoner and his interactions with the Devil. It is preceded by The Wife of Bath's Tale and followed by The Summoner's Tale.

== Plot summary ==
On the way to extort money from a widow, the Summoner encounters a yeoman who is dressed in Lincoln green, a costume worn by outlaws and poachers. The two men swear brotherhood to each other and exchange the secrets of their respective trades, the Summoner recounting his various sins in a boastful manner. The yeoman reveals that he is actually a demon, to which the Summoner expresses minimal surprise—he enquires as to various aspects of hell and the forms that demons take. Each makes a vow with the other to take whatever is offered to them and share it between them.

During their travels, they come upon a carter whose horses have become temporarily stuck. Frustrated, he says that the devil may take them. Hearing this, the Summoner asks the demon why he isn't holding him to his word and seizing the horses; he replies that the man does not truly mean what he says—that it is not his "entente" (intent)—and therefore he cannot take them.

They proceed to the house of the widow. The Summoner claims he will do better than the demon and fabricates a court summons in order that the widow will have to bribe him to dismiss the case. He also demands she gives him a new pan in payment for an old debt, falsely claiming he paid a fine to get her off a charge of adultery. Incensed, the old woman damns the summoner to hell unless he repents of his false charges; the devil confirms her "entente"; as the Summoner does not have any inclination to repent, the demon takes his body and soul—as well as the frying pan—to hell.

== Summoner vs. Friar ==
The tale is a satirical and somewhat bitter attack on the profession of summoner—an official in ecclesiastical courts who summons people to attend—and in particular The Summoner, one of the other people on the pilgrimage. Unlike the Miller and the Reeve who tell tales that irritate the other and do not get on for that reason, the Friar and the Summoner seem to have a longstanding hatred between them.

The Friar is a member of one of the mendicant orders which traveled about preaching and making their livings by begging. Part of the animosity between the two characters may be due to these orders of friars, which had been formed relatively recently, interfering with the work of the summoners. Once a friar had taken confession and given absolution to someone they could not be charged in an ecclesiastical court with the same sin. The Friar's tale has no clear original source like many of Chaucer's tales but it is of a type which is common and always seems popular: "the corrupt official gets their comeuppance".

The tale itself continues in the denigration of summoners with its vivid description of the work of a summoner. This includes bribery, corruption, extortion and a network of pimps and wenches acting as informants making this important clerical office seem more like a 14th-century protection racket. The Friar then says that luckily friars are not under summoners' jurisdiction but the Summoner snaps back that neither are women in styves, meaning brothels; which were licensed to operate by archdeacons. Indeed, the Friar in the Prologue seems to be more worldly than was acceptable: he would rather seduce women and hang out in taverns than minister to the poor and the sick or go out on a hunt rather than attend to spiritual duties in a monastery; for that matter he cares little about a poor widow who gives her last penny to him instead of feeding her starving child; Chaucer ironically remarks that the Friar is in the "business" of seeing unmarried women linked to men (see the comment about styves above). In other words, the Friar and the Summoner are hypocritical competitors in the same "rackets" (extortion and pimping) although the Friar is more "virtuous" as unlike the Summoner he does not engage in blackmailing.

== Film adaptations ==
Pasolini adapted the Friar's story in his 1972 Canterbury Tales. In the film the Devil is portrayed by Franco Citti, part of a recurring theme of Citti playing demonic and immoral characters in The Trilogy of Life (as Ser Ciappelletto in The Decameron and is an ifrit in Arabian Nights).
