= Alfred Marks Time =

British TV comedy series (1956–1961)

Alfred Marks Time is a British television comedy series which aired from 1956 to 1961 on ITV. Starring comedian Alfred Marks, the series often parodied popular movies and TV shows. It was produced by Associated-Rediffusion Television, and Jack Hylton Productions.

Denis Gifford wrote, "Alfred Marks Time, with its bellowed intro, began on 12 April 1956, and presented an unprecedented parade of surprise guest stars, all unbilled. These included Peter Sellers, glamorous movie queen Greta Gynt, film hero Robert Beatty, television quizmaster Hughie Green, singer Lucille Mapp, mouth organ player Tommy Reilly, comic Kenneth Connor, as well as an appearance by Mrs Marks, Paddie O'Neil, who would return for a reunion on the 21st show."

Of the 38 episodes produced, only five are known to survive.
