= Scramble (film) =

1970 British film by David Eady

- Titles
- Directed by: David Eady
- Written by: Michael Barnes
- Produced by: Michael Barnes; David Eady
- Starring: Ian Ramsey; Robin Askwith; Lucinda Barnes; Stephen Mallett
- Cinematography: Jo Jago
- Edited by: Jack Dennis
- Music by: Harry Robertson
- Production company: Eady-Barnes Productions
- Distributed by: Children's Film Foundation (U.K.)
- Release date: December 1970 (U.K.)
- Running time: 61 min
- Country: United Kingdom
- Language: English

Scramble is a 1970 British children's sports drama film directed by David Eady and starring Ian Ramsey, Robin Askwith, Lucinda Barnes and Stephen Mallett. It was written by Michael Barnes and produced by Barnes and Eady for the Children's Film Foundation.

== Cast ==
- Ian Ramsey as Jimmy Riley
- Stuart Lock as Colin Buxton
- Stephen Mallett as Brian Buxton
- Lucinda Gorell-Barnes as Vicky Buxton
- Gareth Marks as Oscar Heppelwhite
- Robin Askwith as Lennie
- Carling Paton as Cliff
- Alfred Marks as Mr. Hepplewhite
- James Hayter (uncredited)
- David Lodge (uncredited)
- Peggy Sinclair (uncredited)
- William Lucas (uncredited)
- Graham Stark (uncredited)

== Reception ==
The Monthly Film Bulletin wrote: "A motorcycle scramble club provides an exciting background for this schoolboy adventure, whose suspense reaches its high point in the incident of the sawn-through bridge. The story's serious moral basis (ne'er-do-well Jimmy turning over a new leaf) is brightly camouflaged by David Eady's comic approach, with Alfred Marks giving an enjoyable performance as the discomfited Mr. Hepplewhite and his real-life son Gareth causing much amusement as the cheerfully inept Oscar. Indeed, the younger actors all come up to the high standard set by the adult participants, making Scramble one of the best and most entertaining films the Foundation has yet produced."
