= Fanny Hill (1983 film) =

1983 film by Gerry O'Hara

- Directed by: Gerry O'Hara
- Written by: Stephen Chesley
- Based on: Fanny Hill; 1749 novel by John Cleland
- Produced by: Harry Benn
- Starring: Lisa Foster; Oliver Reed; Shelley Winters; Wilfrid Hyde-White
- Cinematography: Tony Spratling
- Edited by: Peter Boyle
- Music by: Paul Hoffert
- Production companies: Brent Walker Film Productions; Theatre Division; F.H. Filmproduction Limited; Playboy Productions (uncredited)
- Distributed by: Brent Walker Film Distributing
- Release date: 15 July 1983 (West Germany)
- Running time: 98 minutes
- Country: United Kingdom
- Language: English

Fanny Hill (also known as Sex, Lies and Renaissance) is a 1983 British sex comedy film directed by Gerry O'Hara and starring Lisa Foster, Oliver Reed, Wilfrid Hyde-White and Shelley Winters. It is adapted from the 1748 novel of the same name by John Cleland.

== Plot ==
Poor country lass Fanny Hill sets off for London where she embarks on a series of sexual encounters in pursuit of wealth and happiness, "with many erotic asides."

== Cast ==
- Lisa Foster – Fanny Hill (as Lisa Raines)
- Oliver Reed – Edward Widdlecome
- Wilfrid Hyde-White – Mr. Barville
- Shelley Winters – Mrs Cole
- Alfred Marks – Lecher
- Paddie O'Neil – Mrs Brown
- Barry Stokes – Charles (as Jonathan York)
- Maria Harper – Phoebe
- Vicki Scott – Polly (uncredited)
- Lorraine Doyle – Martha (uncredited)
- Angie Quick – Sarah (uncredited)
- Susie Silvey – Jane (uncredited)
- Neil Phelps as Mr. H. (uncredited)
- Robin Hayter as William (uncredited)
- Liz Smith – Mrs. Jones (uncredited)
- Harry Fowler – Beggar (uncredited)
- Gordon Rollings – Beggar (uncredited)
- Howard Goorney – Mr. Croft (uncredited)
- Janet Henfrey – Lady in Intelligence Office (uncredited)

== Production ==
O'Hara said Harry Alan Towers, the Executive Producer, wrote a partial script but O'Hara did not use it. "I had a pretty good cast though," said O'Hara.

== Critical reception ==
- Time Out wrote, "a relatively large budget and some respectable names in the cast list, but this is still limp softcore flummery sold on the half-remembered notoriety of its purported 18th century source...Lawyer Reed and madam Winters, meanwhile, seem as though they have their teeth gritted in the hope that it will all be over soon."
- Sky Movies wrote, "they should have made the script funnier, got Kenneth Williams and Joan Sims - and retitled it Carry On Fanny..."
