= Play Safe (public information film) =

1978 British public information film series

- Directed by: David Eady
- Written by: David Eady; Neil Ewart
- Produced by: Antony Barrier
- Starring: Bernard Cribbins; Brian Wilde
- Cinematography: Dudley Lovell
- Edited by: Roy Ayton
- Music by: Harry Robertson
- Production companies: Barrier Films; Children's Film Foundation; Electricity Council
- Release date: 1978
- Running time: 10 minutes
- Country: United Kingdom
- Language: English

Play Safe is a series of three public information films (PIFs) directed by David Eady and broadcast in the United Kingdom from 1978 highlighting to children the dangers of playing near overhead power lines and electrical substations. The broadcasts were sponsored by the Electricity Council, as part of wider efforts to educate the public about electricity. In a fashion typical for such broadcasts of the period, the films were made to be frightening for young children – depicting graphic electrocution scenes well before the 9pm watershed for programmes unsuitable for children. Television transmission was typically most frequent during school holidays and at times of day dedicated to children's programming.

The three individual films were in fact part of a longer 10-minute film shown in schools to highlight the dangers of electricity. The film was hosted by two animated characters, a Wise Owl voiced by Brian Wilde, famous for his roles in Last of the Summer Wine and Porridge, who indoctrinates a younger bird, Robin, voiced by Bernard Cribbins, in electrical dangers and then shows the three films as demonstration of the hazards described. The inclusion of these animated characters provided a reassuring presence to younger children who would have been potentially traumatized by the events depicted in the films.

Within this longer film, all three separate films differ slightly from their individual TV broadcasts with very minor changes to the music. However, the first film 'Frisbee' is notable also for about 5 seconds of additional footage not broadcast on TV, showing more of the character 'Jimmy' forcing entry through the sub-station fence, and also an additional graphic shot after his electrocution where his body, frozen upright, begins to immolate at the leg.

The longer 10-minute film also features a fourth incident not released as a separate stand-alone TV PIF. This focuses on the consequences of vandalism to electrical infrastructure and opens with a teenage boy, encouraged by friends, throwing a chain up to a 132,000 volt pylon, causing an explosive short circuit which in turn triggers an area blackout. This knocks out power to local traffic lights, which results in a young girl being knocked off her bike and killed. It subsequently transpires that the girl in question is in fact the younger sister of the teenage vandal who caused the power cut.

Within both the 10-minute film and as a stand-alone PIF, the film 'Frisbee' is not narrated. However, in both formats, the other two films are narrated by Brian Wilde and also commence and end with a white on black caption with the words 'Play Safe' placed between two prongs between which a violent arc of electricity then occurs.

The 'Play Safe' campaign was superseded in 1988 by a new film called 'Powerful Stuff' which was also presented in both a longer version for schools and separate stand-alone PIFs for television broadcast. This featured brief clips from the earlier film. The tone of this later campaign, whilst broadly aimed at all ages, placed the emphasis on older children and teenagers.

== Cast ==
- Bernard Cribbins as Robin
- Brian Wilde as Owl
- Andrew Bagley as Jimmy
- Jayne Tottman as Amy

== Television Broadcasts ==
Play Safe was regularly broadcast during advertising breaks on ITV and Channel 4 well into the 1980s. The three broadcasts were:

1. Frisbee: The campaign was infamous for this PIF. A young boy named Jimmy accidentally throws a Frisbee into an electricity sub-station, where it becomes wedged into an insulator. Although reluctant to do so, his sister Amy persuades him to retrieve it. He breaks through the perimeter security, climbing up onto a high voltage transformer to retrieve the Frisbee. As he reaches out to the Frisbee, he is electrocuted and killed by a 66,000 volt current arcing from the insulator string, much to his sister's horror as she cries out her brother's name. The film cuts to a radio broadcast stating that he was killed instantly by a 66,000 volt shock and warning children to stay away from sub-stations. The radio is shown to be in Amy and Jimmy's home and the camera pans to the sight of Jimmy's school uniform, never to be worn by him again, hanging from the newel post before ending on a replay of the electrocution and Amy screaming.
2. Kites and Planes: A young boy flies a kite near an electricity pylon (transmission tower), not realizing that the kite control cord is a conductor. The boy receives a shock when the kite makes contact with a conductor on the 132,000 volt pylon. As a stand-alone TV broadcast, it is assumed the incident is fatal. However, within the 10-minute film, it is stated afterwards by the 'Wise Owl' character that the victim was 'badly burned but didn't die'.
3. Camping and Fishing: The film highlighted the dangers of using fishing rods and camping poles near overhead power lines. After depicting a few near-misses, it concludes with a boy receiving an electric shock from a wooden-pole-supported 11,000 volt wire when the mast of his boat strikes the conductor. Again, from the stand-alone TV broadcast, the incident is assumed fatal, but again the longer film clarifies otherwise, referring to the victim having been 'knocked unconscious but alright after a few days'.
