= Camborne Hill =

"Goin' up Camborne Hill"

Song
- Language: English
- English title: Going up Camborne Hill
- Songwriter: Unknown

Camborne Hill (Cornish: Bre a Gammbronn) is a Cornish song that celebrates Richard Trevithick's historic steam engine ride up Camborne Hill, (Tehidy Road up Fore Street) to Beacon on Christmas Eve in 1801. A commemorative plaque is inlaid in a wall. It is popular at Rugby matches and Cornish gatherings all around the world.

Camborne Hill itself runs from Tehidy Road Post Office up Fore Street to the corner of HSBC with Commercial Street. Camborne Hill is not Beacon Hill which runs from the library to Beacon as is commonly misinterpreted.

Peter Kennedy has suggested that the song is a "parody on Jack Hall." As Kennedy notes, E.A. White wrote in 1940 that the song "Jack Hall" may have been a development on the form of "The Digger's Song," which White dates to 1649. Harry B. Welliver, Jr. recorded the railroad inspector Frederick Carhart singing the song in 1949 in Houghton, Michigan, USA, and Carhart suggests he learned the song in 1913 from Cornish miners who had just arrived in the United States.

On 11 September 2001, Rick Rescorla, a chief security officer at the World Trade Center (WTC) in New York, originally from Hayle and a rugby man, sang Cornish rugby songs on his megaphone to keep morale high as he was evacuating over 2,000 employees of Morgan Stanley from the WTC's Second Tower. Survivors have said to particularly remember him singing Camborne Hill. Rescorla was last seen alive on the 10th floor, heading upwards, shortly before it collapsed.

== Lyrics ==
Goin' up Camborne Hill, coming down
Goin' up Camborne Hill, coming down
The horses stood still;
The wheels went around;
Going up Camborne Hill coming down

White stockings, white stockings she wore (she wore)
White stockings, white stockings she wore
White stockings she wore:
The same as before;
Going up Camborne Hill coming down

I knowed her old father old man (old man)
I knowed her old father old man
I knowed her old man:
He blawed in the band;
Going up Camborne Hill coming down

I 'ad 'er, I 'ad 'er, I did
I 'ad 'er, I 'ad 'er, I did
I 'ad 'er, I did:
It cost me a quid
Going up Camborne Hill coming down

He heaved in the coal, in the steam (the steam)
He heaved in the coal, in the steam
He heaved in the coal:
The steam hit the beam
Going up Camborne Hill coming down

Oh Please 'ave a baby by me
Oh Please 'ave a baby by me
I'm young and I'm strong:
Won't take very long
Going up Camborne Hill coming down

Goin' up Camborne Hill, coming down
Goin' up Camborne Hill, coming down
The horses stood still;
The wheels went around;
Going up Camborne Hill coming down

== In popular culture ==
The song is used several times in Pasolini's film The Canterbury Tales despite the fact that it is very anachronistic for the 1300s. The tune is sung by travelers at the Tabard Inn as they lie down to rest.
