= The Miller's Tale =

Part of the Canterbury Tales

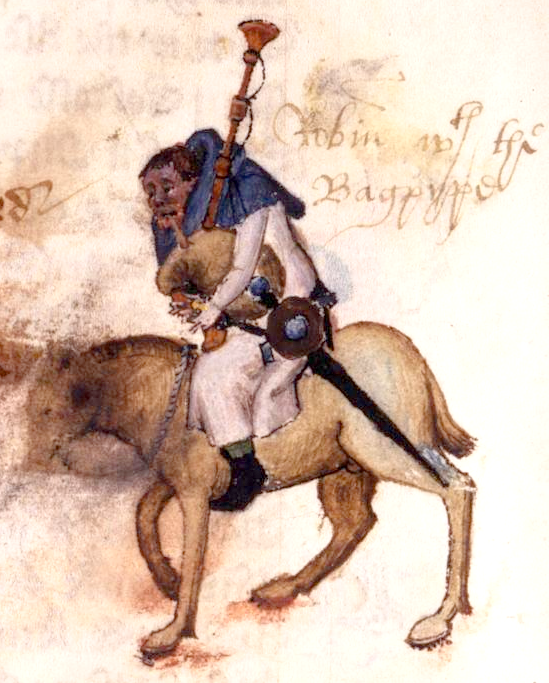
Illustration of Robin the Miller, from The Miller's Tale, playing bagpipes

"The Miller's Tale" (Middle English: The Milleres Tale) is the second of Geoffrey Chaucer's Canterbury Tales (1380s–1390s), told by the drunken miller Robin to "quite" (a Middle English term meaning requite or pay back, in both good and negative ways) "The Knight's Tale". The Miller's Prologue is the first "quite" that occurs in the tales.

== Prologue ==
The general prologue to The Canterbury Tales describes the Miller, Robin, as a stout and evil churl fond of wrestling. In the Miller's Prologue, the pilgrims have just heard and enjoyed "The Knight's Tale", a classical story of courtly love, and the Host asks the Monk to "quite" with a tale of his own. Before the Monk can respond, however, the drunken Miller insists on going next. The Host tries to persuade the Miller to let some "bettre" man tell the next tale, but acquiesces when the Miller threatens to leave the company. The Miller claims that his tale is "noble", but reminds the other pilgrims that he is quite drunk and cannot be held accountable for what he says. He explains that his story is about a carpenter and his wife, and how a clerk "hath set the wrightes cappe" (that is, fooled the carpenter). Osewold the Reeve, who had originally been a carpenter himself, shouts out his immediate objection to such ridicule, and protests that the tale will insult carpenters and wives, but the Miller insists on proceeding with his tale.

"The Miller's Tale" begins the trend in which succeeding tellers "quite" (or one-up) the previous story with their own. In a way, the Miller requites the "Knight's Tale" and is himself directly requited with "The Reeve's Tale", in which the Reeve follows Robin's insulting story about a carpenter with his own tale disparaging a miller.

== Synopsis ==
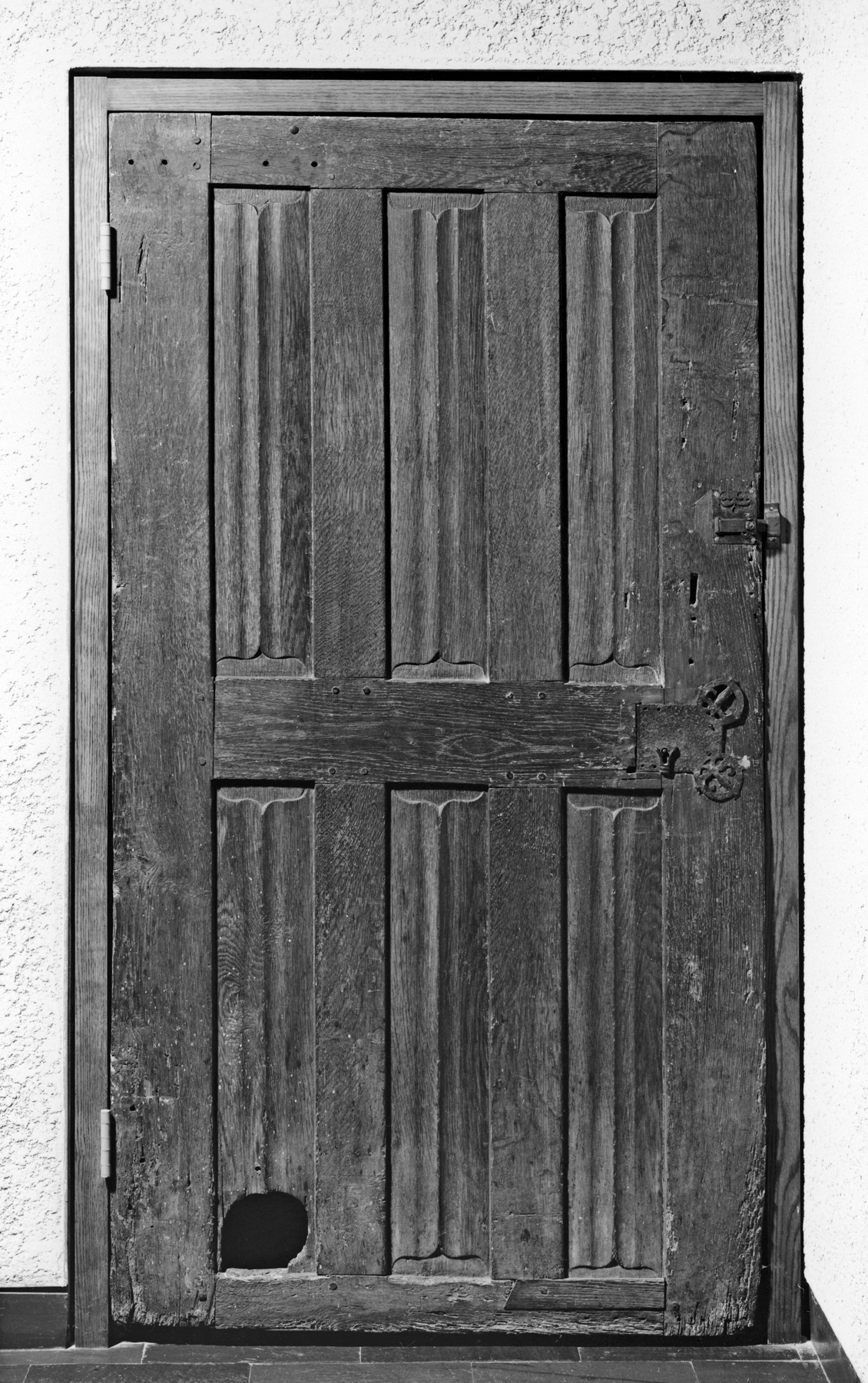
Door with Cat Hole (carved oak, Late Medieval period, 1450–1500, France, Walters Art Museum) This door, carved with a linen-fold decoration, was probably a back or interior door of a middle-class home. It is remarkable for its cat hole. Few doors with cat holes have survived from this early period, but the 14th-century English writer Geoffrey Chaucer described one in the "Miller's Tale" from his Canterbury Tales. In the narrative, a servant whose knocks go unanswered, uses the hole to peek in: "An hole he foond, ful lowe upon a bord/ Ther as the cat was wont in for to crepe,/ And at the hole he looked in ful depe,/ And at the last he hadde of hym a sighte."

"The Miller's Tale" is the story of a carpenter, his lovely wife, and two younger men who are eager to sleep with her. The carpenter, John, lives in Oxford with his much younger wife, Alisoun, who is a local beauty. In order to make extra money, John rents out a room in his house to a clever Oxford University student named Nicholas, who has taken a liking to Alisoun. Another man in the town, Absolon, the parish clerk, also has his eye on Alisoun.

The action begins when John makes a day trip to a nearby town. While he is gone, Nicholas grabs Alisoun "by the queynte". When she threatens to cry for help, he begins to cry and, after a few sweet words, she agrees to have sex with him when it is safe to do so. Their affair begins. Shortly afterward, Alisoun goes to church, where Absolon sees her and immediately is filled with "love-longing." He tries to woo Alisoun by singing love songs under her window during the full moon and sending her gifts. He also seeks her attention by taking a part in a local play. However, Alisoun rebuffs all his efforts because she is already involved with Nicholas.

Nicholas, meanwhile, longs to spend a whole night in Alisoun's arms rather than just the few moments they get during John's absences. With Alisoun, he hatches a scheme that will enable him to do that. Being a student of astrology, Nicholas tells John that he has divined that a terrible event is about to occur. The next Monday night, there will be a massive flood, twice as great as the one in Noah's time. God has told him they can save themselves by hanging three large tubs from the ceiling of the barn, each loaded with provisions and an axe. When the flood waters have risen, they can cut the ropes, hack through the roof, and float until the flood subsides. John believes him and, on Monday night, they ascend by ladders into the hanging tubs. As soon as John is asleep, Nicholas and Alisoun climb down, run back to the house, and sleep together in John's bed.

That same night, Absolon comes to the house and begs Alisoun to kiss him. At first she refuses, but Absolon persists, so she offers him one quick kiss. Instead of presenting her lips to Absolon, though, she sticks her backside out the bedroom's "shot-window" (privy vent), and Absolon kisses her "ers" (arse) in the dark. Angry at being fooled, Absolon gets a red-hot coulter from the blacksmith, with which he intends to burn Alisoun in revenge. He returns with it to the window and knocks again, promising Alisoun a gold ring in exchange for a kiss. This time, Nicholas, having gotten up anyway to relieve himself, sticks his buttocks out to get in on the joke and farts thunderously in Absolon's face. Absolon thrusts the coulter "amidst the ers" of Nicholas who cries out for "Water!" to assuage the pain.

The screams wake John who, hearing the cries of "water!", thinks "Nowel's flood" (the unlettered carpenter confuses "Noe" (Noah) with "Nowel" (Christmas)) is upon them and cuts the rope attaching his tub to the ceiling. He crashes to the floor, breaking his arm, and the townspeople, hearing the noise, rush to the scene. Upon hearing Nicholas's and Alisoun's version of events, they laugh at poor John and consider him mad. The tale ends: "Thus, swyved was this carpenteris wyf, / For al his kepyng and his jalousye, / And Absolon hath kist hir nether ye, / And Nicholas is scalded in the towte. This tale is doon, and God save al the rowte!"

== Arts and culture ==
Geoffrey Chaucer wrote during the reign of Richard II, who very much appreciated the arts and culture of the time. We see this in The Miller's Tale when Chaucer describes what is in Nicholas' bedroom.

His Almageste and books grete and smale,
His astrelabie longynge for his art,
Hise augrym stones layen faire apart
On shelves couched at his beddes heed"

Nicholas is described not by his valor in battle or honour in the court. Instead, his many skills are described at great length, including the fact that he is studying one of the many scholarly arts that were popular at that time. Chaucer then goes on to describe what Nicholas is wearing and his skills as a musician.

His presse ycovered with a faldyng reed,
And al above ther lay a gay sautrie
On which he made a nyghtes melodie
So swetely that al the chambre rong,
And Angelus ad virginem he song,
And after that he song The Kynges Noote;
Full often blessed was his myrie throte!

Again Nicholas is shown not as a brave knight but as a talented musician. He is shown to be very cultured as well as studied. Chaucer shows that Nicholas was skilled in the art of music, as he knew these certain songs which might have been quite popular at the time. What Nicholas wears could also be here to show that Nicholas wore clothes befitting his social class status. This focus on what a person could wear based on status was also important to Richard II.

== Analysis ==
The tale appears to combine the motifs of two separate fabliaux, the 'second flood' and 'misdirected kiss', both of which appear in continental European literature of the period. Its bawdiness serves not only to introduce the Reeve's tale, but the general sequence of low comedy which terminates in the unfinished Cook's tale.

This Absolom, that jolly was and gay,
Gooth with a sencer (censer) on the haliday,
Sensynge the wyves of the parisshe faste;
And many a lovely look on hem he caste,
And namely on this carpenteris wyf. (3339)

Alisoun, however, does not return Absolom's affections, although she readily takes his gifts.

A third theme, that of knowledge and science, appears in several marginal comments. Nicholas is an avid astrologer (as Chaucer himself was), equipped with, "His Almageste, and bookes grete and smale, / His astrelabie, longynge for his art..." John the carpenter represents unintellectual laymen; John tells Nicholas:

Men sholde nat knowe of goddes pryvetee [God's private affairs].
Ye, blessed be alwey a lewed [unlearned] man
That noght but oonly his bileve kan! [who knows nothing except the Creed] (3454)

He also recounts a story (sometimes told of Thales) of an astrologer who falls into a pit while studying the stars. The issue of whether learned or unlearned faith is better is also relevant to The Prioress's Tale and The Parson's Tale.

The Miller’s Tale draws on a lot of biblical information, mainly that of the Ark of the Covenant and Noah’s Ark. The Ark of the Covenant is referenced due to the root of the word arc meaning both chest and hidden in Latin, making an ark a hiding place. The ark of the Covenant was made to hide the tablets of law, Aaron’s Rod and the pot of manna, in a similar way, the tubs in which Nicholas, John and Alisoun are made to hide the 3 of them to keep them safe. The more obvious reference is to that of Noah’s Ark, Both Nicholas and Noah make reference to “Astrologye” being a catalyst for the information they receive about the coming flood. The stars were said to be able to predict events at the time. They also reference Divine Intervention of God speaking to them and the stars showing that a great cataclysm is coming. Nicholas uses this mix of astrology and information from God to convince John that he is not crazy by rooting it in how Noah found out. Chaucer also manages to draw a parallel between Gabriel the Angel and Nicholas by giving John the message about the flood, much like how Gabriel gave the message of Mary being pregnant with the son of God to her. Nicholas resembles Gabriel in the fact he is described somewhat effeminate and is eloquent with his words. The two diverge in the fact that Nicholas seduces John’s wife, and they commit adultery, which Gabriel did not do with Mary.

== Parody ==
The tale is replete with puns. Much is made of variations on "priv-" implying both secret things and private parts. Nicholas fondles Alisoun's "queynte", a noun, after Nicholas is described as "ful queynte", or very clever. Absolom is also described after his humiliation as having his ardour "yqueynt" or quenched.

The Miller's name is intended as a pun on the phrase "rob 'em". As told in the Reeve's Tale the Miller is not just a bully but a thief of grain he is supposed to grind for his customers.

== Continuations ==
The 15th-century Tale of Beryn depicts the Miller trying and failing to explain the stained glass windows of Canterbury cathedral.

Chaucer refers to the Distichs of Cato when discussing the age difference between Alison and her husband with this passage: "He knew nat Catoun, for his wit was rude." The Distichs of Cato was one of the most common textbooks in schools throughout medieval Europe, and was familiar to almost anyone with a basic education in Latin.

The painting Netherlandish Proverbs by Pieter Breugel the Elder illustrates many of the themes in this story including a shot-window in use, a man with his backside on fire, a falling through a basket from a roof, pious hypocrisy, and cuckolding.

== Adaptations ==
The Miller's Tale is one of eight of Chaucer's tales adapted in Pasolini's The Canterbury Tales. Jenny Runacre portrays Alison, Michael Balfour portrays John the carpenter, Dan Thomas portrays Nicholas, Peter Cain portrays Absolom, Martin Philips portrays Martin and Alan McConnell portrays Gervase the blacksmith.

== See also ==
- Angelus ad virginem
