= Bottle Boys =

British TV series (1984–1985)

- Created by: Vince Powell
- Starring: Robin Askwith
- Country of origin: United Kingdom
- Original language: English
- No. of series: 2
- No. of episodes: 13

Production
- Running time: 30 minutes
- Production company: London Weekend Television

Original release
- Network: ITV
- Release: 1 September 1984 – 24 August 1985

Bottle Boys is a British sitcom which ran for two series on ITV between 1 September 1984 and 24 August 1985. Starring Robin Askwith as football-mad milkman Dave Deacon, the series mined broad comedy from Dave's work situations and his amorous adventures, including dressing up as a cow, inadvertently becoming engaged to Sharon the secretary, and meeting then-Prime Minister Margaret Thatcher (played by the actress Janet Hargreaves).

The show is currently being repeated on Rewind TV.

== Background ==
The part of Dave Deacon was originally written for Jim Davidson, who was by this time moving into sitcom with Up the Elephant and Round the Castle, also on ITV. When he was unavailable, future BBC controller John Birt, during his tenure at London Weekend Television, suggested that Askwith take the part.

== Reception ==
The first episode of Bottle Boys drew 9.3m viewers, placing it 16th in that week's ratings chart. However, no other episodes appeared in the Top Twenty listings.

The series is widely regarded as one of the worst British sitcoms ever produced. Mark Lewisohn, writing in the Radio Times Guide to Comedy, observes that "ITV sitcoms had often plumbed the depths, but this was the limit", and also observed that Bottle Boys was reputedly despised by comedy executives at ITV. He described Bottle Boys as his choice for "worst ever" British sitcom.

Writer Vince Powell was no stranger to working on shows that attracted bad press, having created two of the most controversial comedy shows of the 1970s: Love Thy Neighbour and Mind Your Language.

The programme also made number 97 in Channel Four's 100 Greatest TV Moments from Hell list show, a retrospective of television's low points of the last fifty years.

== Cast ==
- Robin Askwith – Dave Deacon
- David Auker – Billy Watson
- Oscar James – Joe Phillips
- Phil McCall – Jock Collins
- Richard Davies – Stan Evans
- Eve Ferret – Sharon Armstrong
- Patrick Newell – Mr Dawson
- Leo Dolan – Wilf Foley
- Ann Michelle (one episode)
- Zara Nutley (one episode)
- Alan Gear (one episode)
- Candy Davis (one episode)
- Pam St. Clement (one episode)
- Don Henderson (one episode)
- Bernie Winters – himself (one episode)

== Episodes ==
Series	Episodes	Originally released	
Series	Episodes	First released	Last released
1	6	1 September 1984	6 October 1984
2	7	13 July 1985	24 August 1985

=== Series 1 (1984) ===
No. overall	No. in series	Title	Directed by	Written by	Original release date
1	1	"Fools Rush In"	Stuart Allen	Vince Powell	1 September 1984
2	2	"God Save Our Dairy"	Stuart Allen	Vince Powell	8 September 1984
3	3	"Danger, Women at Work"	Stuart Allen	Vince Powell	15 September 1984
4	4	"All in a Day's Work"	Stuart Allen	Vince Powell	22 September 1984
5	5	"One Good Turn"	Nic Phillips	Vince Powell	29 September 1984
6	6	"Here Comes the Groom"	Stuart Allen	Vince Powell	6 October 1984

=== Series 2 (1985) ===
No. overall	No. in series	Title	Directed by	Written by	Original release date
7	1	"Things That Go Bump in the Night"	Stuart Allen	Vince Powell	13 July 1985
8	2	"I Gotta Horse"	Stuart Allen	Vince Powell	20 July 1985
9	3	"Out of the Frying Pan"	Stuart Allen	Vince Powell	27 July 1985
10	4	"If the Cap Fits"	Stuart Allen	Vince Powell	3 August 1985
11	5	"High Noon"	Stuart Allen	Vince Powell	10 August 1985
12	6	"I Love Paris"	Stuart Allen	Vince Powell	17 August 1985
13	7	"The Milk Cup Runneth Over"	Stuart Allen	Vince Powell	24 August 1985
