= Danger on Dartmoor =

1980 British film by David Eady

- Directed by: David Eady
- Screenplay by: Audrey Erskine-Lindop; Dudley Leslie
- Based on: original story by Audrey Erskine-Lindop; Dudley Leslie
- Produced by: Michael Barnes
- Starring: Marcus Evans; Simon Henderson; Debby Salter
- Cinematography: Norman Jones
- Edited by: Teddy Darvas; Raymond Poulton
- Music by: Harry Robinson
- Production company: Eady-Barnes Productions Ltd
- Distributed by: Children's Film Foundation (UK)
- Release date: 1980 (UK)
- Running time: 56 min
- Country: United Kingdom
- Language: English

Danger on Dartmoor is a 1980 British children's drama film directed by David Eady and starring Marcus Evans, Simon Henderson, Debby Salter, Barry Foster and Patricia Hayes.

== Plot ==
Children lost in a fog on Dartmoor face dangers including a savage dog and an escaped prisoner.

== Cast ==
- Marcus Evans as Robin Chudleigh
- Simon Henderson as Jonathan Chudleigh
- Debby Salter as Louise
- Barry Foster as Green
- Patricia Hayes as Mrs. Green
- Sam Kydd as Sam
- Michael Ripper as taxi driver
- Michael Goldie
- David Jackson as police sergeant
- Jonathan Newth as Mr. Chudleigh
- Mitzi Rogers as Mrs. Chudleigh

== Reception ==
The Monthly Film Bulletin wrote: "Although the basic situation may prove a trifle over-familiar to all but the smallest children, a script remarkably free of clichés (e.g., Patricia Hayes never once saying of her convict son "He's a good boy"), an intelligent use of locations, and even the occasional idea that would serve in a higher-powered thriller (e.g., Louise converting Green to the straight and narrow with statistics from her pocket calculator) make for fifty-seven minutes without a single longueur. Nice performances all round, with a special mention to Demon."
