= Hide and Seek (1972 film) =

British children's drama by David Eady

- Directed by: David Eady
- Screenplay by: Mike Gorell Barnes (Michael Barnes)
- Based on: idea by Roy Brown
- Produced by: Michael Barnes
- Starring: Peter Newby; Gary Kemp; Eileen Fletcher
- Cinematography: Jo Jago
- Edited by: Ray Poulton
- Music by: Harry Robinson
- Production company: Eady-Barnes Productions
- Distributed by: Children's Film Foundation (UK)
- Release date: October 1972 (UK)
- Running time: 61 min
- Country: United Kingdom
- Language: English

Hide and Seek is a 1972 British children's drama film directed by David Eady starring Peter Newby, Gary Kemp, Robin Askwith, Liz Fraser, Terence Morgan and David Lodge. The screenplay was by Mike Gorell Barnes. It was filmed on location in Deptford, south-east London. The film received a Royal premiere for the Children's Film Foundation's 21st anniversary, attended by the Duchess of Kent.

== Plot ==
Keith, a.k.a. the Deptford Dodger, is a runaway from Borstal eager to join his dad, who has told him in a letter that he is leaving England. However, when Keith encounters two local children, he discovers that his father is actually planning a bank heist.

== Cast ==
- Peter Newby as Keith Lawson
- Gary Kemp as Chris Barker
- Eileen Fletcher as Beverley Dickie
- Robin Askwith as fake Police Constable
- Roger Avon as first workman
- Richard Coleman as Police sergeant
- Frances Cuka as Mrs. Dickie
- Roy Dotrice as Mr. Grimes
- Liz Fraser as Audrey Lawson
- Godfrey James as Police Constable Dickie
- Alan Lake as Lorrimer
- David Lodge as baker
- Alfred Marks as butcher
- Terence Morgan as Ted Lawson
- Johnny Shannon as Wykes
- Bernard Spear as fruit vendor
- Graham Stark as milkman

== Critical reception ==
The Monthly Film Bulletin wrote: "Although Terence Morgan is convincing as the unsuccessful master criminal, the film's surface realism is frequently offset by the comic stereotyping of the other adult characters, several of whom are played by well-known comedians. ... Though the children's parts are played with an unwavering solemnity (and some rather unsteady Cockney accents), they too are rendered less credible by a script which determinedly presents the boy from the approved school as a less resourceful version of the average boy scout ... Despite these contradictions – in part, perhaps, because of them – Hide and Seek emerges as a highly entertaining and well made adventure story for younger children. But one can't help wondering whether Deptford's teenage population will find a shade Utopian its image of a friendly local constabulary which apparently knows every inhabitant by name."

The BFI described it as "amongst the best of the CFF's 1970 (sic) output."
