= On the House (TV series) =

British TV comedy series (1970–1971)

- Starring: Kenneth Connor; John Junkin; John Normington; Tommy Godfrey; Gordon Rollings; Derek Griffiths; Peter Atard; Robin Askwith
- Country of origin: United Kingdom
- No. of series: 1
- No. of episodes: 12

Original release
- Release: 24 September 1970 – 27 May 1971

On the House is a British television comedy which aired from 1970 to 1971. Cast included Kenneth Connor, John Junkin, John Normington, Tommy Godfrey, Gordon Rollings, Derek Griffiths, Peter Atard, and Robin Askwith. It was produced by Yorkshire Television, and despite the wiping that was common during the early 1970s, all the episodes are still in existence.
