= Ator 2 – L'invincibile Orion =

- One-sheet for The Blade Master, the North American release
- Directed by: Joe D'Amato
- Written by: Joe D'Amato
- Produced by: John Newman
- Starring: Miles O'Keeffe; Lisa Foster; David Brandon; Charles Borromel
- Cinematography: Joe D'Amato
- Edited by: David Framer
- Music by: Karl Michael Demer; Carlo Rustichelli
- Production companies: Metaxa Corporation; Royal Film Traders
- Distributed by: New Line Cinema
- Release date: December 16, 1982
- Running time: 92 minutes
- Country: Italy
- Languages: Italian; English

Ator 2 – L'invincibile Orion ("Ator 2: Orion the Invincible"), or The Blade Master (North American title), is a 1982 Italian sword and sorcery film directed by Joe D'Amato, and starring Miles O'Keeffe as Ator, Charles Borromel as Akronos, Lisa Foster as Mila (daughter of Akronos), and David Brandon as Zor.

== Plot ==
Akronos has discovered the Geometric Nucleus during the course of his research. The Nucleus is a device of incredible power that could be used as a terrible weapon in the wrong hands. Akronos feels that the Nucleus must be kept from evil men at all costs. When he learns that the evil Zor and his army are approaching his castle, he asks his daughter Mila to bring his former student Ator back to help defeat him. Mila runs away to find Ator. Zor's soldiers enter and begin beating Akronos, but Zor angrily sends them away to maintain his magnanimous image.

Mila is pursued by Zor's soldiers and is wounded by them but continues to stagger towards Ator's home. At last, she arrives, and Ator uses his medical knowledge to heal her wound. She is then able to convince him that she is the daughter of Akronos, and that her father is in terrible danger.

Mila, Ator, and Oriental warrior Thong begin the journey back to Akronos' castle, facing various dangers along the way, including a tribe of cave-dwelling cannibals, another group determined to sacrifice them to their god (which is a giant snake), and other soldiers.

Finally, they make it back to the castle. While Mila and Thong sneak in the back way, Ator uses his knowledge of flight to quickly create a hang glider, which he flies over the castle, dropping bombs on Zor's soldiers. Having defeated most of Zor's forces, Ator takes on Zor himself and defeats him. Akronos convinces Ator to let Zor live to face trial, but when Ator steps away, Zor grabs a sword to threaten Ator, and Zor is killed by Thong.

Afterward, Akronos gives the Geometric Nucleus to Ator. Ator tells Mila he has to leave, that his life is too dangerous to share with her. Mila says that she knows Ator must fight evil where ever it occurs. Ator leaves Thong behind to help take care of Mila and Akronos. He then takes the Nucleus to a distant land, where he destroys it, resulting in a nuclear explosion.

== Cast ==
- Miles O'Keeffe as Ator
- Lisa Foster as Mila
- Charles Borromel as Akronos
- Chen Wong as Thong, Ator's teacher
- David Brandon as Zor (credited as David Cain Haughton)
- Nancy Hall as 1st maiden
- Linette Ray as 2nd maiden
- Sandra Carle as old woman
- Osiride Peverello as Sadur
- Nello Pazzafini as warrior captain
- Salvatore Baccaro as caveman

== Production ==
In early 1983, a few months after Ator, the Fighting Eagle was a commercial success, D'Amato embarked on a new project, casting Miles O'Keeffe again as the lead and Lisa Foster as his partner. D'Amato and scriptwriter José Maria Sanchez, who had already worked on the first Ator film, prepared a prehistoric film in the vein of the successful Academy Award–winning French film Quest for Fire (1981). The working title was Adamo ed Eva. According to D'Amato, when everything was ready for the shoot and rehearsals had already begun, Miles O'Keeffe backed out for religious and moral reasons. Mark Gregory played the lead role in Adamo ed Eva.

O'Keeffe starred in Ator 2 instead. D'Amato commented that "Ator 2 was made in great haste and almost without a script," and includes footage from the first Ator film in the form of flashbacks. D'Amato said they made it to take advantage of a contract they had with Miles O'Keeffe.

== Release ==
=== Italy ===
According to Kinnard & Crnkovich, the film was released in Italy on December 16, 1982, while Michele Giordano states that filming only began in early 1983. (Giordano and Poppi both maintain that the film was never theatrically released in Italy.) On VHS, it was released by Eureka Video as Ator l'invincibile, which is actually the cinematic title of the previous Ator.

=== United States ===
Ator 2 was released in the United States as The Blade Master on February 15, 1984, with a 92-minute running time. The film was shown on American television under the title Cave Dwellers, a version of the film that included footage from the film Taur the Mighty in the opening credits.

=== Other countries ===
The film has also been released under the titles Ator the Invincible (United Kingdom), Ator II - Der Unbesiegbare (Germany), and both Ator, el invencible and Ator 2, el invencible (Spain).

== Reception and legacy ==
Total Film included Ator 2 – L'invincibile Orion in their list of the 66 worst films of all time.

In its Cave Dwellers TV version (sold by Film Ventures International), the film was parodied as the third season premiere of Mystery Science Theater 3000.
