= David Eady (film director) =

British film director (1924–2009)

David Eady (April 22, 1924 – April 5, 2009) was a British film director and producer. Born in London, he was the son of Sir Wilfred Eady (of the Eady Levy). His films include documentaries, dramas (often second features), and children's films. He received a BAFTA nomination for his short film Play Safe (1978), and an Oscar nomination was given to the short he co-directed with Geoffrey Boothby, Bridge of Time (1950).

== Filmography ==
- Bridge of Time (1950)
- Three Cases of Murder (1955)
- The Heart Within (1957)
- The Man Who Liked Funerals (1959)
- In the Wake of a Stranger (1959)
- The Crowning Touch (1959)
- Zoo Baby (1960)
- Faces in the Dark (1960)
- The Verdict (1964)
- Operation Third Form (1966)
- Scramble (1970)
- Betcher! (1971)
- Anoop and the Elephant (1972)
- Hide and Seek (1972)
- Where's Johnny? (1974)
- The Hostages (1975)
- Play Safe (1978)
- Danger on Dartmoor (1980)
