= Bridge of Time =

1950 short film by Geoffrey Boothby and David Eady

- Directed by: Geoffrey Boothby; David Eady
- Screenplay by: David Eady
- Produced by: Alexander Korda
- Cinematography: Georges Périnal
- Edited by: Audrey Bennett
- Music by: Hubert Clifford
- Production company: London Film Productions
- Release date: July 1950
- Running time: 17 minutes
- Country: United Kingdom
- Language: English

Bridge of Time is a 1950 short documentary film directed by Geoffrey Boothby and David Eady and narrated by Anthony Bushell. It was produced by Alexander Korda's London Films, and was nominated at the 25th Academy Awards (1953) in the category of Best Short Subject (Two Reel).

== Synopsis ==
A travelogue-style documentary study of the sights, atmosphere and traditions of London, including London Bridge, the Tower of London, Traitors' Gate, London policemen, Chelsea Pensioners, the Trooping of the Colour.

== Critical reception ==
The Monthly Film Bulletin wrote: "It illustrates, in attractive technicolor, various modern customs and ceremonies (the trooping of the colour, the boat race), and places (the Tower of London, Battersea Power Station, London Bridge). The commentary attempts to link up the modern scene with the past, but does so in unctious tones, replete with snobbery. This is a pity, for the visual material offers a discreet and pleasing variation on the travelogue theme."
