= Alfred Marks =

English actor and comedian (1921–1996)

Alfred Marks OBE
- Born: Alfred Edward Touchinsky; 28 January 1921; Holborn, London, England
- Died: 1 July 1996 (aged 75); Hillingdon, London, England
- Occupations: Actor, comedian
- Spouse: Paddie O'Neil (m. 1952)
- Children: 2

Alfred Edward Marks (born Alfred Edward Touchinsky; 28 January 1921 – 1 July 1996) was a British actor and comedian. In his 60-year career, he played dramatic and comedy roles in numerous television programmes, stage shows and films. His self-titled television sketch show ran from 1956 to 1961.

== Biography ==
Marks was born as Alfred Edward Touchinsky in Holborn, London, to Polish Jewish parents. He left Bell Lane School at 14 and started in entertainment at the Windmill Theatre. He then served in the RAF as a Flight Sergeant in the Middle East where he arranged concerts for servicemen. He also worked as an auctioneer and engineer.

He started in variety at the Kilburn Empire in 1946, and his stage appearances included The Sunshine Boys and Fiddler on the Roof. He also did comedy work with Peter Sellers and Harry Secombe which later led to the formation (along with writer Spike Milligan) of The Goon Show, though Marks did not become a member.

His films included The Frightened City, Scream and Scream Again and Our Miss Fred. His television show, Alfred Marks Time, ran for 6 years on ITV. He compèred Sunday Night at the London Palladium and in 1966 he appeared as a narrator in five episodes of the BBC children's television show Jackanory. Marks also appeared in numerous other television programmes including The Good Old Days, The Sweeney, Blankety Blank, The Marti Caine Show, The Two Ronnies, The Generation Game, Lovejoy, Minder, Parkinson, The All New Alexei Sayle Show, and The Persuaders! amongst others.

In 1965 he appeared in Bill Naughton's Spring & Port Wine at the Mermaid Theatre, London, playing Rafe, and in 1967, he toured Australia for J. C. Williamson Theatres in that play. In 1968, he played the lead in The Young Visiters, a musical version of the turn of the 20th century Daisy Ashford novel (written when she was nine and published as submitted by her with the spelling errors) at the Piccadilly Theatre in London. When he was the subject of This Is Your Life in December 1971, he was surprised by Eamonn Andrews at London's Garrick Theatre. Marks was a fine bass-baritone and appeared regularly on the BBC TV series 'The Good Old Days'. One of his most memorable renditions was of Kipling's 'The Road to Mandalay', in the version made famous by Peter Dawson. He appeared as "Wilfred Shadbolt" in a video production of the Gilbert and Sullivan opera The Yeomen of the Guard in 1982, and the title role in The Mikado for English National Opera in January 1989 where his musicianship and "warmly modulated bass-baritone" allied with "easy projection of the text into this large auditorium", resulted in a "slyly underplayed, faultlessly controlled comic performance".

While on tour in Australia, Marks was appointed the second King of Moomba (1968) by the Melbourne Moomba festival committee. When asked what his qualifications were, he quipped (in full Cockney):

When I was eleven there were rival gangs around a fruit market in the East End. And desperately, I always wanted to be a member of the bigger rival gang. One day when I was in my best Easter suit, someone from one of the other gangs said to me 'would you like to be King of the Golden Apples?' 'All right, just sit there on this box and call out Apples, Apples, give me the Golden Apples.' Which innocently I did and they cobbled me with every rotten apple in the market.

== Personal life ==
Marks married actress Paddie O'Neil in 1952. They remained together until his death. The couple had two children, both of whom became actors, Gareth and Danielle.

He was awarded the OBE in 1976.

== Selected filmography ==
=== Film ===
- Penny Points to Paradise (1951) – Edward Haynes
- Johnny, You're Wanted (1956) – Marks
- Desert Mice (1959) – Poskett
- There Was a Crooked Man (1960) – Adolf Carter
- A Weekend with Lulu (1961) – Comte de Grenoble
- The Frightened City (1961) – Harry Foulcher
- She'll Have to Go (1962) – Douglas Oberon
- Scream and Scream Again (1970) – Detective Supt. Bellaver
- Scramble (1970) – Mr. Heppelwhite
- Hide and Seek (1972) – Butcher
- Our Miss Fred (1972) – General Brincker
- Valentino (1977) – Richard Rowland
- Fanny Hill (1983) – Lecher

=== Television ===
- Fire Crackers (1964–1965) – Charlie, Fire Chief
- Albert and Victoria (1970–1971) – Albert Hackett
- The Ghosts of Motley Hall (1977) – Saladin
