= The Hostages (1975 film) =

1975 British film by David Eady

- Opening titles
- Directed by: David Eady
- Screenplay by: Michael Barnes
- Cinematography: Jo Jago
- Music by: Harry Robinson
- Production company: Eady-Barnes Productions
- Release date: 1975
- Running time: 58 minutes
- Country: United Kingdom
- Language: English

The Hostages is a 1975 British children's adventure film directed by David Eady and starring Stephen Garlick, Jayne Collins, Peter Marshall, Julian Holloway and Robin Askwith. It was written by Michael Barnes and made by Eady-Barnes Productions for the Children's Film Foundation.

== Plot ==
Escaped convicts Joe Blake and Terry Sladden break into a remote farmhouse while the owners are away, and kidnap three children as hostages.

== Cast ==
- Stephen Garlick as Peter
- Jayne Collins as Kate
- Peter Marshall as Tim
- Lucinda Gorell-Barnes as Helen
- Ray Barrett as Joe Blake
- Robin Askwith as Terry Sladden
- Jeremy Bulloch as policeman

== Critical reception ==
Monthly Film Bulletin said "Another extremely well-made children's thriller for the Children's Film Foundation which packs a good deal of tension into its brief running time, thanks to split-second editing and a fine eye for country locations. The young players are rather more natural than usual and, of the adults, Ray Barrett contributes a sharp sketch of the injured convict with a few finer feelings than his companion, played with a touch of early Widmark by Robin Askwith. The fact that the film closely resembles The Desperate Hours, as well as leaning on situations familiar from many American TV featurettes which children can see at any time, makes one feel that the CFF might now turn their talents to fresher material."

== Home media ==
It was released on DVD in 2024 by the British Film Institute as part of Children's Film Foundation Bumper Box Vol. 5.
