= The Summoner's Tale =

Part of the Canterbury Tales

Opening of the tale.

"The Summoner's Tale" is one of The Canterbury Tales by Geoffrey Chaucer.

The tale is a fierce counterpunch to the preceding tale by the Friar, who had delivered an attack on summoners. Summoners (Latin: apparitor) were officials in ecclesiastical courts who delivered a summons to people who had been brought up on various charges; the office was prone to corruption, since summoners were infamous for threatening to bring people up on charges unless they were bought off. The Friar had accused them of corruption and taking bribes, and the Summoner seeks to address the Friar through his own story.

== Sources ==
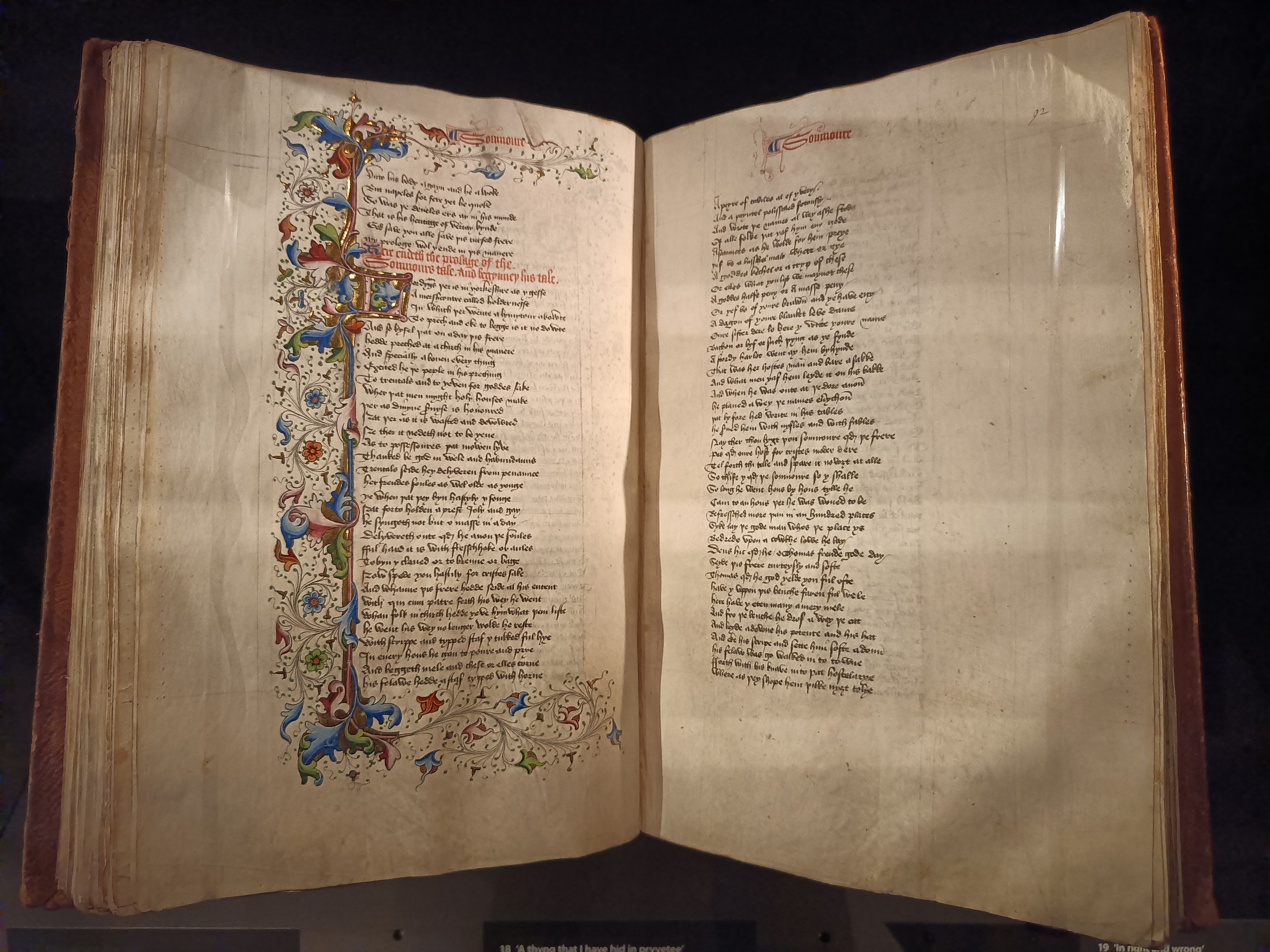
MS. Bodl. 686 (1430s) open to the Summoner's Tale.

The Summoner in fact tells several tales, all of them directed at friars. The main tale of a grasping friar seems to contain many original elements composed by Chaucer but Jill Mann suggests that it is based on "The Tale of the Priest's Bowels", a French thirteenth-century fabliau:

"A pious priest, when on his deathbed, was urged by two holy friars to revoke some of the charitable bequests he has already made, so that he may give something to their order. The priest promises to give them a precious jewel, which turns out to be a gaseous release from his bowels."

The bawdy story the Summoner tells in his prologue seems to be an inversion of a story in Caesarius of Heisterbach's Dialogus miraculorum. In Caesarius's story, a monk ascends to heaven and finds his fellow Cistercians living under the cloak of the Virgin Mary. In the Summoner's version the friar descends into hell and not seeing any other friars believes they are all such goodly men, but the angel who accompanies him says to Satan:

Hold up thy tayl, thou Sathanas!' quod he;
'Shewe forth thyn ers, and lat the frere se
Where is the nest of freres in this place!'

With that the freres (friars) fly out of Satan's ers (arse), swarm about the room and disappear back up his ers.

== Plot summary ==
A friar went to preach in Holderness, a marshy region of Yorkshire. In his sermons he begged for donations for the church and afterward he begged for charity from the local residents. The Friar interrupts the story, calling the Summoner a liar, but is silenced by the Host.

The friar in the story continued to beg house by house until he came to the house of Thomas, a local resident who normally indulged him, and found him ill. The friar spoke of the sermon he had given that day, commenting on the excellent way he had glossed the biblical text (and making the famous comment that "Glosynge is a glorious thyng") – and essentially ordered a meal from Thomas's wife.

She told the friar that her child had died recently. The friar claimed that he had a revelation that her child had died and entered heaven. He claimed that his fellow friars had a similar vision, for they are more privy to God's messages than laymen, who live richly on earth, as opposed to spiritual riches. The friar claimed that, among the clergy, only friars remain impoverished and thus are closest to God; and told Thomas that his illness persists because he had given so little to the church.

Thomas claimed that he had indeed given "ful many a pound" to various friars, but never fared the better for it. The friar, characteristically, is irritated that Thomas is not giving all of his money solely to him, and points out to him that a "ferthyng" (a farthing) is not worth anything if split into twelve. Continuing to lecture Thomas, the friar began a long sermon against anger ("ire"), telling the tale of an angry king who sentenced a knight to death, because, as he returned without his partner, the king automatically assumed that the knight had murdered him. When a third knight took the condemned knight to his death, they found the knight that he had supposedly murdered. When they returned to the king to have the sentence reversed, the king sentenced all three to death: the first because he had originally declared him murdered, the second because he had declared him the agent of the first's death, and the third because he did not obey the king's order to kill the second.

The friar continued to sermonize against anger with the story of another ireful king, Cambises, who was a drunkard. When one of his knights claimed that drunkenness caused people to lose their co-ordination, Cambises drew his bow and arrow and shot the knight's son to prove that he still had control of his reflexes. The friar then told of Cyrus, the Persian king who had the River Gyndes destroyed because one of his horses had drowned in it.

At the close of this sermon, the friar asked Thomas for money to build the brothers' cloister. Thomas, annoyed by the friar's hypocrisy, told the friar that he had a gift for him that he was sitting on, but that he would only receive it if he promised to split it up equally between each of the friars.

The friar readily agreed, and put his hand down behind Thomas's back, groping round – and Thomas let out a fart louder than a horse could make. The friar became immediately angry, and promised to repay Thomas for his fart, but, before he could, the servants of the house chased the friar out.

The enraged friar found the lord of the village and told him of the embarrassment he suffered, angrily wondering how he was supposed to divide a fart into twelve. The lord's squire spoke up with a suggestion, in return for a "gowne-clooth" from his master: take a cartwheel, and tell each of twelve friars to lay his nose at the end of a spoke. Then the friar of the tale could sit in the centre of the wheel and fart, and each of the spokes would carry the smell along to the rim – and therefore, divide it up between each of the friars.

== Analysis ==
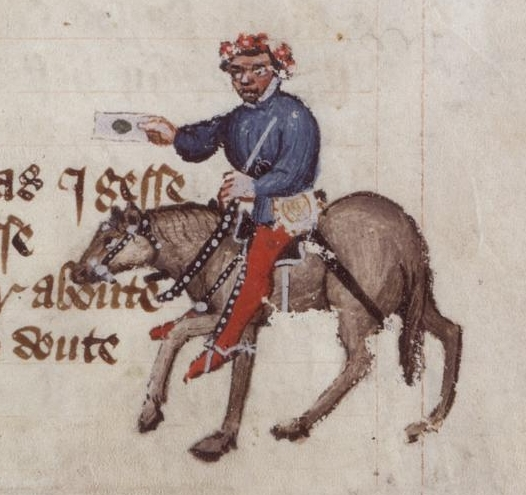
The Summoner from the Ellesmere Manuscript of Chaucer's The Canterbury Tales

The Summoner uses the tale to satirise friars in general, with their long sermonising and their tendency to live well despite vows of poverty. It reflects on the theme of clerical corruption, a common one within The Canterbury Tales and within the wider 14th-century world as seen by the Lollard movement. The attitude of the lord implies that he is as unimpressed as any layman with the friars.

Neither the Summoner's nor "The Friar's Tale" leave either of them looking particularly good. After the Friar's tale the Summoner does not use his own tale to defend summoners but rather he replies with his own attack. The short stories warning about ire within his main story are possibly a comment on the unheeded anger between both of them.

He is described as being lecherous with his red face disfigured with boils and—like the Miller and the Cook—quite drunk. His shield is described as a barley cake. Among his other attributes is extortion—dealing out false summons to court and either tricking foolish persons to bribe him with tavern feasts—or being beaten up by a potential victim; also theft-taking more than his share of court fines; and being a pimp and then blackmailing victims. He also wears a garland of oak leaves; since such a garland proclaimed the wearer was a "King of Outlaws" (e.g. William Wallace), Chaucer's readers would have recognised the Summoner as a corrupt clerical servant (as satirised in "The Friar's Tale"). Chaucer ironically remarks that the Summoner's only friend among the Pilgrims is the equally greedy and hypocritical church official Pardoner.

== Film adaptations ==
Pasolini adapted the tale in his film The Canterbury Tales with John Francis Lane as the corrupt friar, Hugh McKenzie-Bailey as the dying Thomas, Anita Sanders as Thomas's wife (her scenes were later removed and are now lost) and Settimo Castagna as the Angel. Pasolini also adapts the scene from the Summoner's prologue where the Devil defecates corrupt friars from his anus.
