= Robin Askwith =

English actor (born 1950)

- Born: Robin Mark Askwith; 12 October 1950 (age 76); Southport, Lancashire, England
- Education: Corona Theatre School
- Occupation: Actor
- Years active: 1968–present
- Spouses: Leonie Mellinger (m. 1988; div. 1991) Mary Wilson (m. 1996; div. 2002)
- Partner(s): Cheryl Hall (1970–1973); Linda Hayden (1975–1983)
- Relatives: Robb Wilton (great-uncle)
- Website: www.robinaskwith.com

Robin Mark Askwith (born 12 October 1950) is an English actor and singer who has appeared in a number of film, television and stage productions.

Making his film debut as Keating in the film if.... (1968), a role he would reprise in Britannia Hospital (1982), Askwith went on to appear in many films including Otley (1969), Alfred the Great (1969), Nicholas and Alexandra (1971) and The Canterbury Tales (1972), the horror films Tower of Evil (1972), The Flesh and Blood Show (1972) and Horror Hospital (1973) and the comedy films Bless This House (1972), Carry On Girls (1973) and No Sex Please, We're British (1973). However it was his role as Timothy Lea in the Confessions film series that would make him a household name.

Askwith has appeared on television as Fred Pickering in Beryl's Lot (1973–1975), Dave Deacon in Bottle Boys (1984–1985) and Ritchie de Vries in Coronation Street (2013–2014).

In 1975, at Drury Lane's New London Theatre, Askwith was voted "Most Promising Newcomer – Male" at the Evening Standard British Film Awards. Askwith's most recent television roles include Emmerdale, Benidorm and a main role in The Madame Blanc Mysteries.

== Early life ==
Askwith was born in Southport, Lancashire, England, the eldest child of Nelson and Hazel Askwith (née Cookson). His father was an accountant but served in the Royal Navy during the Second World War and his mother in the Women's Royal Naval Service (WRENs). As a young child, he swam in an outdoor pool contaminated with insects; later that day Askwith's mother found him fully submerged underwater in the bath. Taken to hospital in an ambulance, Askwith was found to have contracted polio and had to spend nine months in an isolation ward at Southport Infirmary and had to learn how to walk again. Shortly after this, the family moved from Southport to Eastcote, Middlesex, where Askwith was educated at Orley Farm in nearby Harrow. Particularly sporty at school, Askwith represented the school at football, rugby and cricket, and after joining the Ruislip and Northwood Swimming Club, he represented the South Counties at backstroke.

Askwith began an interest in acting because his neighbour was the floor manager at Pinewood Studios where he and his neighbour's son would watch movies being filmed, including The Servant (1963) and Cleopatra (1963). The next-door neighbour of a friend was Carry On actor Kenneth Connor. Askwith began attending a local amateur dramatics group and also did a stint of modelling for catalogues and appeared in several commercials for baked beans and Fairy Liquid.

After finishing at Orley Farm at the age of twelve, Askwith attended Merchant Taylors' School, Northwood. He found the school unduly strict and became a rebellious student to the extent that Askwith and two friends stole several rifles from the school armoury and held up Pinner post office, stealing hundreds of pounds' worth of stamps with the intention of returning them the following week. Askwith also persuaded a crane operator, who was carrying out work at the school, to lift the headmaster's car onto the school roof.

As a result of playing King Edward IV during a school production of Richard III, Askwith was approached by film director Lindsay Anderson, who had been in the audience, and encouraged him to audition for a role in his upcoming film if..... Following a successful audition, he played the role of Keating in the film.

== Career ==
Following the success of if..., Askwith made his television debut as a yob in the BBC series Scene. He would also attend the Corona Theatre School in between acting jobs. Askwith had roles in the historical epic film Alfred the Great (1969), the thriller Otley (1969), and, playing the title role, in the film version of Hans Brinker and the Silver Skates (1969). In 1970, Askwith had his first major role in the comedy film Cool It Carol! (1970).

Askwith then appeared on television in series such as Randall and Hopkirk (Deceased) and Father, Dear Father, and a recurring role as Eddie in Please Sir!, and its spin-off The Fenn Street Gang, before having his first regular role as Harvey Micklethwaite in the sitcom On The House in 1971. In 1970, Askwith starred in Scramble (1970), the first of four films he would make for the Children's Film Foundation, the others being All Coppers Are... (1971), Hide and Seek (1972), and The Hostages (1975). Askwith also had a role in the epic film Nicholas and Alexandra (1971). He would then have roles in television series including Dixon of Dock Green, Public Eye, The Main Chance and Bless This House, and in a deleted scene from the film Brother Sun, Sister Moon (1972). Askwith also starred in a string of horror films: Tower of Evil (1972), The Flesh and Blood Show (1973), and Horror Hospital (1973).

After appearing in Pasolini's The Canterbury Tales (1972) and the comedy film Four Dimensions of Greta (1972), Askwith played Mike Abbot in the film version of television sitcom Bless This House (1972). During filming, Askwith became good friends with co-star Sid James. Other members of the cast included comedy stalwarts Peter Butterworth, Terry Scott, June Whitfield and Wendy Richard. Impressed by his performance, the producers offered Askwith the role alongside Sid James in Carry On Girls (1973).

Shortly after starring in Antony Balch's Horror Hospital (1973), Askwith was offered the starring role in Confessions of a Window Cleaner (1974), directed by Val Guest. The part had been turned down by Richard Beckinsale, Richard O'Sullivan, Nicky Henson and Dennis Waterman. The success of the film led to three sequels, Confessions of a Pop Performer (1975), Confessions of a Driving Instructor (1976) and Confessions from a Holiday Camp (1977).

Although the Confessions series came to an end with Confessions from a Holiday Camp, a fifth and a sixth film, Confessions of a Plumber's Mate and Confessions of a Private Soldier had been planned. Askwith even expressed a desire to direct Private Soldier, but neither film materialised. Plans to shoot a further made-for-video Confessions film in the 1980s also came to nothing, although by this time he was appearing in the poorly received ITV sitcom Bottle Boys (1984–1985).

He has also had roles in the soap operas EastEnders, Doctors, Hollyoaks and Coronation Street where he played a holiday tour guide named Aidan. The episodes of the soap that featured Askwith were filmed in Malta, close to the island of Gozo where he has lived for many years. Askwith returned to Coronation Street on 11 December 2013 as musician Ritchie de Vries.

Askwith published his autobiography, titled The Confessions of Robin Askwith in 1999. In 2000, Askwith had a role in the horror film The Asylum.

Askwith made a cameo appearance in the film Run For Your Wife, released in the UK on 14 February 2013. Askwith also appeared in an episode of Emmerdale in 2015. His role as con-man Marcus Hornby in the TV comedy drama Benidorm was broadcast in January 2016, and his episode of Casualty aired later that year.

In 2021, he joined the cast of Channel 5's drama series The Madame Blanc Mysteries appearing alongside Sue Holderness, Sally Lindsay and Steve Edge as a series regular. The first series received a positive reception which led to a Christmas special broadcast in 2022 succeeded by a second series to be broadcast in 2023. In December 2022, Askwith appeared in the fourth and final episode of the quartet, Strike: Troubled Blood, on BBC1. His character, Steve Douthwaite, plays one of the suspected killers in the J. K. Rowling-inspired mystery crime drama.

In 2023, it was announced that he would appear in the eighth series of Inside No. 9, and his name was used in the promotion for episode 5, Hold on Tight!. However the episode was fake and never produced, instead the hoax quiz show 3 by 3 was episode 5 of the series.

In 2024 Askwith appeared in the ninth series of Inside No. 9, trying to get Shearsmith and Pemberton to create a real-life version of Hold on Tight!

=== Stage work ===
Askwith's extensive work on stage, includes numerous farces such as Run For Your Wife, Casanova's Last Stand, One for the Road plus the stage Confessions sequel The Further Confessions of a Window Cleaner and Terry Johnson's Dead Funny. From 11 December 2012 – 27 January 2013, he appeared at the Mill at Sonning, Reading, Berkshire in Ray Cooney's farce Caught in the Net.

In pantomimes, Askwith has appeared with the Chuckle Brothers in Dick Whittington, with Frank Bruno and Sooty in a Wolverhampton production of Goldilocks and the 3 Bears and in various productions of Aladdin as Abanazar.

More unusual stage roles include the title role in a production of Brecht's The Resistible Rise of Arturo Ui, and the Child Catcher in a 2006 touring production of Chitty Chitty Bang Bang.

== Personal life ==
Askwith had relationships with the actresses Cheryl Hall and later Linda Hayden during the 1970s. Askwith married actress Leonie Mellinger in 1988 but they divorced in 1991. From 1996 to 2002, he was married to Mary Smith, an aromatherapist.

Askwith lives on Gozo, a Mediterranean island near Malta, having moved there in 1991, where his hobbies include swimming, underwater diving and yachting; however he regularly returns to the UK for tours, events and filming.

Askwith is a great-nephew of the comic Robb Wilton.

Askwith is a cricket follower and also a supporter of Queens Park Rangers F.C. He also regularly played for charity football teams.

== Filmography ==
=== Film ===
Year	Title	Role	Notes
1968	if....	Keating	
1968	Otley	First Kid	
1969	Alfred the Great	Shepherd	Uncredited
1969	Hans Brinker	Hans Brinker	
1970	Scramble	Lennie	
1970	Cool It Carol!	Joe Sickles	
1970	Bartleby	Office Boy	
1971	Nicholas and Alexandra	Russian Soldier	Uncredited
1972	Brother Sun, Sister Moon	Minor role	Scene cut
1972	Tower of Evil	Des	
1972	Four Dimensions of Greta	Roger	
1972	All Coppers Are...	Simmy	
1972	The Canterbury Tales	Ruffo	
1972	Bless This House	Mike Abbott	
1972	The Flesh and Blood Show	Simon	
1972	Hide and Seek	Johnny	
1972	Snow Patrol	"Snowy" White	
1973	Horror Hospital	Jason Jones	
1973	No Sex Please, We're British	Baker's Delivery Man	
1973	Carry On Girls	Larry Prodworthy	
1974	Confessions of a Window Cleaner	Timothy Lea	
1975	The Hostages	Terry Sladden	
1975	Confessions of a Pop Performer	Timothy Lea	
1976	Confessions of a Driving Instructor	Timothy Lea	
1976	Queen Kong	Ray Fay	
1977	Stand Up, Virgin Soldiers	Pvt. Brigg	
1977	Confessions from a Holiday Camp	Timothy Lea	
1978	Let's Get Laid	Gordon Laid	
1982	Britannia Hospital	Ben Keating	
1983	Stagg's Night	Robin Stagg	
2000	U-571	British seaman	
2000	The Asylum	Neville	
2008	Evil Calls: The Raven	Vincent Carney	
2012	Eldorado	Mick	
2012	Run for Your Wife	Bus Driver	Cameo
2021	Last Train to Christmas	Tristan	

=== Television ===
Year	Title	Role	Notes
1968	Scene	Robbo	Episodes: "Last Bus" & "The Sentence of the Court"
1968	Z-Cars	Uncredited	Unknown episode
1969	Randall and Hopkirk (Deceased)	Jimmy	Episode: "That's How Murder Snowballs"
1969	ITV Saturday Night Theatre	Bassett	Episode: "The Full Cheddar"
1969	There Was This Dog...	Andy	TV film
1970	The Borderers	Hewie Heriot	Episode: "The Quacksalver"
1970	Here Come the Double Deckers	Nigel Parks	Episode: "The Go-Carters"
1970	Menace	Robbie Clay	Episode: "Trespasser"
1971	The Misfit	David	Episode: "... On The New Establishment"
1971	On the House	Harvey Micklethwaite	6 episodes
1971	Father, Dear Father	Monty	Episode: "The Life of the Party"
1971	The Fenn Street Gang	Eddie	Episode: "Meet The Wizard"
1971	Please Sir!	Eddie	Episode: "A.W.O.L."
1971	Dixon of Dock Green	Young Man	Episode: "Wingy"
1972	Bless This House	Sam	Episode: "A Touch of the Unknown"
1972	The Main Chance	Sammy Cutforth	Episode: "The Killing Ground"
1973–1975	Beryl's Lot	Fred Pickering	14 episodes
1975	Public Eye	Employment Clerk	Episode: "How About a Cup of Tea"
1978	The Kenny Everett Video Show	Robin	Episode: #1.4
1982	The Journey	Narrator	TV film
1983	Play of the Month	Alec	Episode: "Infidelities"
1984–1985	Bottle Boys	Dave Deacon	All 13 episodes
1988	Boon	Bograt	Episode: "Peacemaker"
1997	EastEnders	Jason Lafal	Episode: 4 August 1997
2000	Sunburn	Nigel Karver	Episode: "New Opportunities, Second Chances and Dominoes"
2004	Doctors	David Cordman	Episode: "A Lion or A Sheep"
2007	Coronation Street	Aidan	Episode: #1.6611
2009	Benidorm	Gary Snelling	Episode: #3.4
2011	Hollyoaks	Earl	Episode: #1.2989
2013–2014	Coronation Street	Ritchie de Vries	12 episodes
2015	Emmerdale	Alby	Episode: #1.7251
2016	Benidorm	Marcus Hornby	Episode: #8.1
2016	Casualty	Ron Kleinman	Episode: "Step Right Up"
2021–Present	The Madame Blanc Mysteries	Jeremy Lloyd James	27 episodes
2022	Strike	Steve Douthwaite	Episode: "Troubled Blood: Part 4"
2024	Inside No. 9	Robin Askwith	Episode: "Plodding On"

== Television commercials ==
- Baked Beans – brand unknown (year unknown)
- Summer County – margarine (1967) – directed by Ridley Scott
- Smith's Crisps – crisps (1967) with Simon Dee
- Pepsi Cola – drink (1971)
- Thomson Sky Tours – airways (1971) – directed by Tony Scott
- Dulux Magicote – paint (1971)
- TUF Boots – footwear – (1971) – directed by Terence Donovan
- KitKat – chocolate biscuits (1973)
- Guinness – alcohol (1973)
- Car Care – part work magazine (1985)

== Documentaries ==
- Traincare '90 – Narrator (1990)
- King Rocker (2020)
- Keeping the British End Up! (2023)
- Saucy! Secrets of the British Sex Comedy (2024)

== Stage appearances ==
(incomplete)

- Play By Play – Kings Head Theatre, London (1975)
- The Further Confessions of a Window Cleaner – UK Tour (1977)
- The Further Confessions of a Window Cleaner – Rhodesia (1978)
- I Love My Wife – Prince of Wales Theatre, London (1978)
- Who Goes Bare? – UK Tour (1979)
- The Further Confessions of a Window Cleaner – New Zealand Tour (1980)
- The Further Confessions of a Window Cleaner – UK Tour (1980)
- Confessions From A Health Farm – New Zealand Tour (1981)
- Casanova's Last Stand – UK Tour (1982)
- The Resistible Rise of Arturo Ui – Cambridge Theatre Company (1982)
- Aladdin – Theatre Royal, Lincoln (1983)
- Run For Your Wife – Criterion Theatre, London (1984)
- Run For Your Wife – Criterion Theatre, London (1985)
- Doctor in the House – UK Tour (1985)
- Run For Your Wife – New Zealand Tour (1986)
- Funny Peculiar – Australia Tour (1986)
- Jack and the Beanstalk – Wimbledon Theatre, London (1986)
- Run For Your Wife – New Zealand Tour (1987)
- Run For Your Wife – Criterion Theatre, London (1987)
- Aladdin – De Montfort Hall, Leicester (1987)
- Les Enfants Terribles – Avignon Drama Festival (1988)
- One for the Road – Mercury Theatre, Colchester (1988)
- Dick Whittington – Richmond Theatre (1988)
- Run For Your Wife – Jersey (1989)
- One for the Road – UK Tour (1990)
- One for the Road – Australia Tour (1991)
- One for the Road – New Zealand Tour (1992)
- Cash on Delivery – Theatre Royal, Windsor (1993)
- Dick Whittington – Theatre Royal, Bath (1993)
- Run For Your Wife – UK Tour (1994)
- Cinderella – Wimbledon Theatre, London (1994)
- Doctor in the House – UK Tour (1995)
- Dick Whittington – New Theatre, Cardiff (1995)
- Aladdin – Lyceum Theatre, Crewe (1996)
- Dick Whittington – Lyceum Theatre, Sheffield (1997)
- Dick Whittington – Darlington Civic Theatre (1998)
- Aladdin – Yvonne Arnaud Theatre, Guildford (1999)
- Jack and the Beanstalk – Theatre Royal, Nottingham (2000)
- Goldilocks and the Three Bears – Grand Theatre, Wolverhampton (2001)
- Aladdin – Theatre Royal, Newcastle upon Tyne (2002)
- Bedside Manners – Pier Theatre, Bournemouth (2003)
- Aladdin – Milton Keynes Theatre, Milton Keynes (2003)
- Aladdin – New Wimbledon Theatre, London (2004)
- Canterbury Tales – The Castle, Nottingham (2005)
- Chitty Chitty Bang Bang – Sunderland Empire Theatre (2005)
- Dead Funny – UK Tour (2007)
- Aladdin – Cliffs Pavilion, Southend-on-Sea (2008)
- Aladdin – Theatre Royal, Lincoln (2010)
- Funny Money – The Mill at Sonning, Reading (2011)
- Caught in the Net – The Mill at Sonning, Reading (2012)
- Jack and the Beanstalk – Cliffs Pavilion, Southend-on-Sea (2017)
- Aladdin – Darlington Hippodrome (2018)
- Aladdin – Hull New Theatre (2019)

== Recordings ==
- 1975: Appears on the Confessions of a Pop Performer – Original Soundtrack Album
- 1977: Single Confessions/This Space Is Reserved for You (credited as Robin Aswith)
- 1994: Audiobook cassette, HarperCollins Audio – Ian Botham: My Autobiography – Don't Tell Kath read by Robin Askwith
