= The Asylum (film) =

- Directed by: John Stewart
- Written by: John Stewart
- Produced by: Carol Lemon; Harry F. Rushton
- Starring: Ingrid Pitt; Patrick Mower; Robin Askwith; Colin Baker
- Cinematography: Nathan Sheppard
- Music by: Christopher Slaski; Carlo Martelli
- Production company: Nunhead Films
- Release date: 2000
- Running time: 99 minutes
- Country: United Kingdom
- Language: English

The Asylum is a 2000 British horror film written and directed by John Stewart. It starred Ingrid Pitt, Patrick Mower, Robin Askwith and Colin Baker.

== Cast ==
- Steffanie Pitt as Jenny
- Nick Waring as William
- Ingrid Pitt as Isobella
- Patrick Mower as Dr. Adams
- Robin Askwith as Neville
- Colin Baker as Arbuthnot
- Chloë Annett as Rose
- Paul Reynolds as Snape
- Jean Boht as Mrs. Brindle
- Robin Parkinson as Arthur
- Sadie Nine as Mrs Adams
- Hannah Bridges as Young Jenny
- Antonia Corrigan as Young Rose
- Carolina Giammetta as Tessa
- Denis Huett as Mr. Brindle
- Terence Taplin as Father Matthew

== Reception ==
The film had a mixed reception. While some critics enjoyed the film, calling it "tense" and "worth a watch", while others thought it was weak and that the plot didn't make any sense, saying they "expected more from a 21st century horror film".
