= Carlo Martelli =

English composer

Carlo Martelli (born 12 December 1935) is an English composer and viola player of Italian extraction who saw early success and high profile performances with his orchestral and chamber music concert works, but later turned to light music and film scores. He is particularly known for his idiomatic arrangements of music for strings.

== Biography ==
He was born on 12 December 1935 in London, UK, to an Italian father and an English mother, and brought up in Richmond, Surrey. From 1949, aged 13, he attended the Royal College of Music as a Junior Exhibitioner, studying with William Lloyd Webber. He joined full-time in 1952, studying composition with Bernard Stevens. Early works from this period scored for large forces include the Festival Overture and the Symphony No 1 (both scores now lost). But the composer considered his "Opus 1" to be the String Quartet of 1953. Further pieces followed during the 1950s, including the String Quartet No 2 (1954) and the Symphony No 2 (1955-6), which was premiered by the London Symphony Orchestra at a Society for the Promotion of New Music concert on 26 October 1957 at the Royal Festival Hall, conducted by Norman Del Mar. The Serenade for Strings was premiered at the Cheltenham Festival in 1958.

== Career ==
After leaving the RCM, Martelli became a professional viola player, performing with the Royal Philharmonic Orchestra under Thomas Beecham and with the London Symphony Orchestra. Through his friendship with the Dutch-born British composer and conductor Gerard Schurmann, he entered the world of film music with a series of scores during the 1960s, the early examples in the horror genre for the Hammer film company.

The change in Martelli's fortunes came in the early 1960s. Policy changes at the BBC's 'Third Programme' resulted in his music being sidelined in favour of serial and avant-garde experimentation, and Martelli rapidly vanished from the schedules. In addition, he had taken on a demanding workload as a film composer, including working as an uncredited assistant and 'ghost writer' for several other film composers. Martelli sometimes found himself working on two or three films at the same time.

In the early 1970s, council workers unexpectedly emptied his storage space and mistakenly burnt all of his manuscripts, resulting in the only extant scores being those that were already in print by the late 1950s. This led to Martelli giving up composing for many years, making a living instead as a freelance viola player. He could often be seen playing in a string quartet which entertained diners at the original Pizza Express restaurant in London's Soho, and also at Kettner's in Soho on Sunday evenings. This work led to arranging popular songs for string quartet and then to over 250 string arrangements from all areas of the musical canon. As these became more intricate, they eventually heralded a return to original composition in the 1980s.

Persiflage (1983), which means "banter", is a showcase of string technique. This, and other original pieces such as Aubade (1984) and Promenade (1985), shifted the focus of his composition towards light music and received broadcasts and performances by the BBC Concert Orchestra.

More recent works include two operas: A Monkey's Paw (1990), based on a short story by W.W. Jacobs, and the children's opera, The Curse of Christopher Columbus (1992). There is also the Prelude and Fugue for 18 Violas (1993), written for the National Youth Orchestra and later rescored for string sextet. His Jubilee March, a pastiche of English march tunes, was composed for the Queen's Golden Jubilee and premiered at Glamis Castle during 2002.

There are several recordings, including The Curse of Christopher Columbus, the Symphony No 2, Persiflage, Jubilee March, and the String Quartets 1 and 2.

== Concert works ==
- Festival Overture (c 1952 - score lost)
- Symphony No 1 (c 1952 - score lost)
- String Quartet No 1 (1953)
- String Quartet No 2 (1954)
- Serenade for Strings, op.5 (1955)
- Symphony No 2 (1955-56)
- Terzetto for two violins and viola (1956)
- Shredni Vashtar for narrator, boy soprano and orchestra (after Saki) (1956)
- Quartet for flute, oboe, viola and bassoon (1958)
- Fiesta Overture for orchestra (1959).
- Persiflage (1983)
- Aubade (1984)
- Promenade (1985)
- A Monkey's Paw, opera (1990)
- The Curse of Christopher Columbus, children's opera (1992)
- Prelude and Fugue for 18 Violas (1993) (also for string sextet)
- Jubilee March (2002)
- Celebration Day (2005)

== Film music ==
- Tonnage Oxygen (1963) (documentary short)
- The Ceremony (1963, uncredited) (with Gerard Schurmann)
- Dr Syn (1963, uncredited)
- Witchcraft (1964)
- Do You Know This Voice? (1964)
- The Curse of the Mummy's Tomb (1964)
- The Bedford Incident (1965 uncredited) (with Gerard Schurmann)
- Catacombs (1965)
- The Murder Game (1965)
- Who Killed the Cat? (1966)
- Attack on the Iron Coast (1967, uncredited)
- Prehistoric Women (1967)
- It! (1967)
- Lost Continent (1968, uncredited) (with Gerard Schurmann)
- The Break-in (short, 1999) (with Christopher Slaski)
- The Asylum (2000) (with Christopher Slaski)
