= Lisa Foster =

Canadian actress and animation producer

Lisa Foster is a former Canadian actress, visual effects artist, and animation producer; she starred in the title role of the British sex comedy film, Fanny Hill (1983) with Oliver Reed.

== Career ==
=== Films ===
Foster began her professional career at the age of thirteen in Edmonton as a young performer. A few years later, still in her teens, she moved to New York and studied acting at HB Studio with Rochelle Oliver and Elizabeth Dillon and took jazz dance with Buck Heller. A couple of years later she returned to Toronto to model and act. She was a photographic model in Toronto and Montreal and graced fashion magazines like Clin D'Oeil as well as ads for L'Oréal. She got a three-picture deal through producer Harry Alan Towers while in Toronto and was Mila in the mid-1980s film The Blade Master which was later lampooned as an episode of the television series Mystery Science Theater 3000. She then played the lead of Fanny Hill in the movie of the same name 1983 movie Fanny Hill which also starred Shelley Winters and Oliver Reed.

Later on in her life she has directed most of her attention to behind the scenes work where she was proficient as camera operator, stage manager and finally as technical director on the award-winning political panel show, Week in Review (KCLA). She began her visual effects career at Cinesite in Los Angeles as part of the complex restoration team assigned to the major task of digitally reconstructing the Disney animated film Snow White and the Seven Dwarfs (1937). Following the success of these new digital techniques, she went on to work as a technical artist on such films as Coneheads (1993), Cliffhanger (1993) and the Academy Award-nominated (for visual effects) film Super Mario Bros. (1993). As staff animator at Sony Pictures Imageworks, Foster lent her skills to such films as Die Hard with a Vengeance (1995), Wolf (1994), The Cable Guy (1996), Virtuosity (1995), Hideaway (1995), and James and the Giant Peach (1996). Some of the films that include her visual effects work are Die Hard with a Vengeance, James and the Giant Peach and Virtuosity.

She was last known to be directing the 3D animated series Thesaurus Rex aimed at encouraging and challenging visual and vocabulary concepts in preschoolers.

=== Video games ===
From there she moved into the game arena, first as a CG supervisor for Square's mega-hit game Parasite Eve, in which she also directed two key cinematic sequences, and then as a CG supervisor and Technical Director for the games Evil Dead: Hail to the King and THQ's Scooby-Doo. After a stint as Executive Producer for the broadcast design arm of Duck Soup in Los Angeles, Lisa took the Senior Producer position at Phantagram Entertainment. Games included: The Lord of the Rings: The Two Towers based on the Peter Jackson film for Electronic Arts and Kingdom Under Fire: The Crusaders. In 2009 she became the Core Systems and User Generated Content Producer for LEGO's multimillion-dollar MMO, LEGO Universe.

== Filmography ==
=== As actress ===
- Country Gold (1982) as Mrs. Vogel
- Ator 2: The Blade Master (1982) as Mila
- Spring Fever (1982) as Lena
- Fanny Hill (1983) as Fanny Hill
- Marie (1985) as Sherry Lomax
- The Hitchhiker (1985, 1 episode) as Patty
- The Jitters (1989) as Jennifer
- The Twilight Zone (1989, 1 episode) as Nurse Carla
- Come Spy with Me (1989, television film) as Charlie
- Separated by Murder (1984, television film) as Donna Dupree
- A Letter from Death Row (1989) as Charlene Fitzpatrick
- For the Cause (2000) as Systems operator

=== As visual effects artist ===
- Cliffhanger (1993)
- Super Mario Bros. (1993)
- Coneheads (1993)
- Brainscan (1994)
- Wolf (1994)
- Hideaway (1995) – Technical director
- Die Hard with a Vengeance (1995)
- Virtuosity (1995) – Technical director
- James and the Giant Peach (1996)
- The Cable Guy (1996)
- Moomins and the Winter Wonderland (2017) – Animator

=== As video game developer ===
- Parasite Eve (1998) – CGI supervisor
- Evil Dead: Hail to the King (2000) – CGI supervisor
- The Lord of the Rings: The Two Towers (2002) – Producer
- Kingdom Under Fire: The Crusaders (2004) – Senior producer
- Lego Universe (2010) – Systems producer

== Other projects ==
In October 1999, Foster founded an online shopping site called Spreckels Lane.
