= Paddy wester =

Paddy Wester is a traditional Royal Navy term for a young or inexperienced seaman. It might also refer to a "new-boy" in a mess; in times of stability, the "Junior Hand" might remain as such for some years until someone newer is posted.

It was also used in Manchester City Fire Brigade and possibly other fire brigades with naval traditions to designate a man (as it was until recently a male only profession) drafted or seconded onto a shift to cover a temporary shortage. At the Roll Call beginning the shift, as names were called, the stranger would be addressed as "Paddy Wester".

Following the children's cartoon from Trumpton, Cap'n Flack might call the roll "Pugh, Pugh, (they were twins) Barney McGrew, Cuthbert, Paddy Wester and Grub."

The origin of the term is a popular sea shanty about an infamous Liverpool boarding house master named Paddy West who would shanghai recruits and pass them off as experienced sailors to captains looking for crewmen. According to folklore, he would make the new recruits jump over a piece of rope and walk around a table with a cowhorn on it in order to say with a straight face to the captains that they all "crossed the line" and went "ten times round the horn." His other methods of teaching them about seafaring include having the recruits fold his window blinds like a Main Royal and having his wife pour buckets of water on them to simulate the sea conditions during a storm. The recruits were quickly demoted at sea when it became clear they had little seafaring knowledge and thus originates the term's use of derision.

The historical accuracy of this tale is uncertain and the earliest known date of recording appears to be 1951.
