= Reeve (England) =

Anglo-Saxon senior official

In Anglo-Saxon England, a reeve (Old English: gerefa) was an administrative official serving the king or a lesser lord in a variety of roles. After the Norman Conquest, it was an office held by a man of lower rank, appointed as manager of a manor and overseer of the peasants. In this later role, historian H. R. Loyn observes, "he is the earliest English specialist in estate management".

== Types ==
Reeve is a general term that could refer to a variety of administrative officials. Royal reeves worked for the king, but nobles and bishops also employed reeves. Some reeves served as estate managers, while others held positions in towns and boroughs.

== Royal reeves ==
In the late 7th and early 8th centuries, royal reeves oversaw royal estates. By the 10th century, royal reeves performed various duties in shires and hundreds. They enforced legislation and royal decrees. They presided over local courts, carried out police functions, and witnessed sales. A royal reeve's authority often overlapped with that of the ealdorman.

Specific offices within this wider category include:

- High-reeve: a title for the rulers of Bamburgh.
- Portreeve: an official of an authorised trading center.
- Sheriff (Old English: scirgerefa, literally 'shire-reeve'): first appears in the time of Cnut (r. 1016–1035), but may have existed earlier under other names.

== After the Norman Conquest ==
After the Norman Conquest, feudalism was introduced, forming a parallel administrative system to the local courts. The feudal system organised land on a manorial basis, with stewards acting as managers for the landlords. The Norman term describing the court functionary—bailiff—came to be used for reeves associated with lower level courts, and with the equivalent role in the feudal courts of landlords.

Courts fulfilled administrative, as well as judicial, functions, and on the manorial level its decisions could concern mundane field management, not just legal disputes. The manorial bailiff thus could be set tasks such as ensuring certain crops were gathered, as well as those like enforcing debt repayment. Sometimes, bailiffs would have assistants to carry out these tasks, and the term reeve now came to be used for this position—someone essentially assisting the steward, and sometimes a bailiff, by effectively performing day-to-day supervision of the work done on the land within a particular manor.

This reeve has been described as "the pivot man of the manorial system". He had to oversee the work which the peasants were bound to perform, as an obligation attached to their holding of land in the Manor, for the lord of the manor on the demesne land; such reeves acted generally as the overseer of the serfs and peasants on the estate. He was also responsible for many aspects of the finances of the manor such as the sale of produce, collection of monies and payment of accounts.

He was usually himself a peasant, and was chosen once a year, generally at Michaelmas. In some manors the reeve was appointed by the lord of the manor, but in others he was elected by the peasants, subject or not to a right of veto by the lord. It depended on the custom of the manor, but there was an increasing tendency for election to be favoured. No doubt an elected reeve was more willingly obeyed, and sometimes the peasants would be made financially liable if an elected reeve defaulted.

Although this reeve was subject to the steward, the steward might not always be resident within the manor, and might manage many, and would not usually concern himself with day-to-day working. A good reeve who carried out his duties efficiently, and was trusted by the lord and the peasants alike, was likely to stay in office more or less permanently. By the 14th century the reeve was often a permanent officer of the manor.

With the subsequent decline of the feudal system, and the subversion of its courts by the introduction of justices of the peace (magistrates), this use of reeve fell out of practice.

== Depiction by Chaucer ==
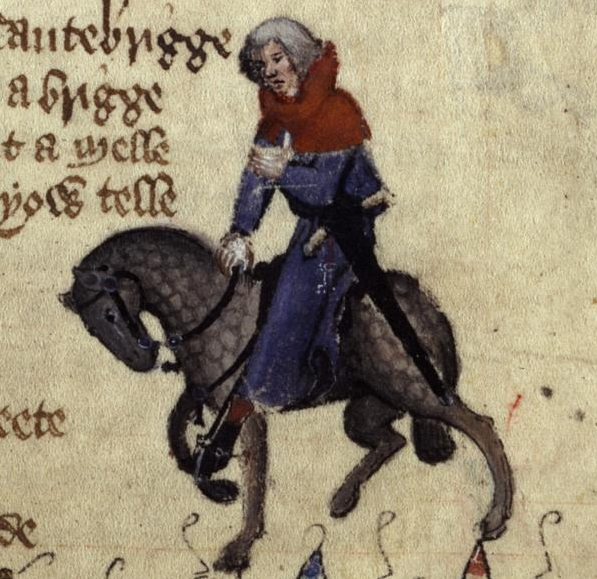
Oswald the Reeve in "The Reeve's Tale" by Geoffrey Chaucer

There is an exceptional literary portrait of a reeve in the second half of the 14th century. The reeve is one of the pilgrims who are making their way to Canterbury in Chaucer's The Canterbury Tales, and the Prologue paints a vivid picture of this man, who had originally been a carpenter but has served as reeve of a manor for many years and had grown old in service. "The Reeve's Tale" is the third story in The Canterbury Tales, in which Chaucer describes a highly efficient servant, impossible for any man to deceive or outwit, never in debt and knowing exactly how much the manor should produce. It is an early picture of a completely reliable accountant, rather a cold individual but indispensable.

== See also ==
- Reeve (Canada)
- Verderer
