= Paddie O'Neil =

British actress and singer (1926–2010)

- BBC Radio publicity still c.1945
- Born: Adalena Lillian Nail; 1 May 1926; Leominster, Herefordshire, England
- Died: 31 January 2010 (aged 83); London, England
- Occupation(s): Actress, singer
- Spouse: Alfred Marks (m. 1952; died 1996)
- Children: 2

Paddie O'Neil OBE (born Adalena Lillian Nail, 1 May 1926 – 31 January 2010) was a British actress and singer.

The daughter of circus and fairground performers and herself born on a caravan at Leominster, Herefordshire, O'Neil spent her childhood travelling and performing at fairgrounds. While at stage school in London she was spotted and signed up by the BBC. She was a singer on the radio during the Second World War years, and presented the variety show Navy Mixture. Paddie met the actor Alfred Marks while performing in Brighton, and they were married in 1952. They had two children. Also a writer of comedy material, Paddie was the first female writer-producer to be hired by Independent Television at its inception in 1954.

She was made Officer of the Order of the British Empire (OBE) in 1976.

== Filmography ==
- Penny Points to Paradise (1951)
- The Early Bird (1965)
- The Adding Machine (1969)
- Fanny Hill (1983)
