= The Reeve's Tale =

Part of the Canterbury Tales

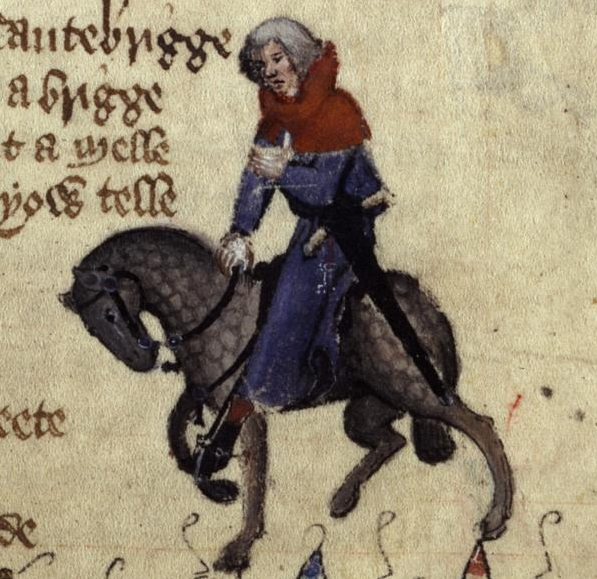
Oswald the Reeve

"The Reeve's Tale" is the third story told in Geoffrey Chaucer's The Canterbury Tales. The reeve, named Oswald in the text, is the manager of a large estate who reaped incredible profits for his master and himself. He is described in the Tales as skinny, bad-tempered, and old; his hair is closely cropped reflecting his social status as a serf. His sword is rusty while he rides a fine gray horse called Scot. The Reeve is a skilled carpenter, a profession mocked in the previous "Miller's Tale". Oswald responds with a tale that mocks the Miller's profession.

The tale is based on a popular fabliau (also the source of the Sixth Story of the Ninth Day of The Decameron) of the period with many different versions, the "cradle-trick". Chaucer improves on his sources with his detailed characterisation and sly humour linking the act of grinding corn with sex. The northeastern accent of the two clerks is also the earliest surviving attempt in English to record a dialect from an area other than that of the main writer. Chaucer's works are written with traces of the southern English or London accent of himself and his scribes, but he extracts comedy from imitating accents.

== Summary ==
Symkyn is a miller who lives in Trumpington near Cambridge and who takes wheat and meal brought to him for grinding. Symkyn is also a bully who cheats his customers with the help of his "golden thumb" (i.e. using his thumb to tip the scale in his favour and overcharge) and claims to be a Master with a sword and dagger and knives (cf. the coulter in "The Miller's Tale"). Symkyn and his arrogant and snobbish wife are extremely proud that she is the daughter of the town clergyman (which is peculiar because her parentage means she is illegitimate, as priests in later medieval England could not marry). They have a twenty-year-old daughter Malyne and a six-month-old son. At the time the story was written it was customary for young women to marry as soon as they reached puberty; Malyne is kept as a virgin by her selfish and social climbing parents so that she can be married off with a dowry of copper dishes to a wealthy husband of higher social status.

When Symkyn overcharged for his latest work grinding corn for Soler Hall, a University of Cambridge college also known as King's Hall (which later became part of Trinity College), the college steward was too ill to face him. Two clerical students there, John and Aleyn, originally from Strother in North East England, are outraged at this latest theft and vow to beat the miller at his own game. John and Aleyn hold an even larger amount of wheat than usual and say they will watch Symkyn while he grinds it into flour, pretending that they are interested in the process because they have limited knowledge about milling. Symkyn sees through the clerks' story and vows to take even more of their grain than he had planned, to prove that scholars are not always the wisest or cleverest of people. He unties their horse, and the two students are unable to catch it until nightfall. While they are away chasing their horse, Symkyn steals the clerks' flour and gives it to his wife to bake a loaf of bread.

Returning to the miller's house, John and Aleyn offer to pay him for a night's sleeping there. He challenges them to use their rhetorical training to make his single bedroom into a grand house. After much rearranging, Symkyn and his wife sleep in one bed, John and Aleyn in another, and Malyne in the third. The baby boy's cradle sits at the foot of the miller's bed.

After a long night of drinking wine, Symkyn and his family fall fast asleep while Aleyn and John lie awake, plotting to take revenge through the rape of Malyne and rape by deception of her mother. First Aleyn creeps over to Malyne in her bed while she remains fast asleep. He leaps on her and then, the narrating Reeve announces, "it had been too late for to crye" (line 4196). When the miller's wife leaves her bed to relieve herself of the wine she has drunk, John moves the baby's cradle to the foot of his own bed. Upon returning to the darkened room, the miller's wife feels for the cradle to identify her bed. She mistakenly assumes that John's bed is her own. When she crawls into the bed she thinks is her own, John leaps upon her and begins having sexual intercourse with her.

Dawn comes and Aleyn says goodbye to Malyne. She tells him to look behind the main door to find the bread she had helped make with the flour her father had stolen. Seeing the cradle in front of what he assumes is Symkyn's bed (but is in fact John's), he goes to the other bed, shakes the miller—who he thinks is John—awake and recounts that he had "thries in this shorte nyght / Swyved the milleres doghter", Malyne (lines 4265–6). Hearing this, Symkyn rises from his bed in a rage, which wakes his wife in John's bed. She takes a club and hits her raging husband by mistake, thinking him one of the students. John and Aleyn beat up the miller and flee, taking with them their horse and the bread made from their stolen grain. Both students ride off and get a good laugh of their revenge with the beating of the cheating Miller and the double humiliation on his wife and daughter; despite their tearful farewells Aleyn has no thought of either Malyne or whether she is now pregnant with a child which may ruin her parents' plans to make an advantageous marriage for her (although such a child could be passed off as a third child born to her parents, as was not unusual with illegitimate births). The Reeve goes on to say that the story demonstrates the proverb "Hym thar nat wene wil that yvele dooth" (One who does evil fares badly) and concludes "A gylour shal hymself bigyled be" (a deceiver will himself be deceived) (lines 4320–22).

== Sources ==
Although some scholars are reluctant to say that Chaucer ever read The Decameron, Chaucer's story bears a strong resemblance to Tale 6 of Day IX which tells of two clerks lodging with an innkeeper for the night. One of the clerks, who has long been an admirer of the innkeeper's daughter, slips into her bed while she is asleep and, after her fears are overcome, they both enjoy sex together. Later, a cat wakes up the innkeeper's wife and she gets up to investigate. The second clerk gets up to go to the bathroom and moves the cradle in front of the innkeeper's bed because it is in the way. After he returns to his bed, the innkeeper's wife returns and feels her way to the bed with the cradle in front of it, which is actually the clerk's bed. She slips in beside him and both are surprised and have sex together. The wife later explains to the suspecting innkeeper that she was in her daughter's bed all night. The story has several differences from Chaucer's in that the clerks do not plot against the innkeeper but are only there to get to his daughter. No mill is even mentioned in the story.

More broadly, "The Reeve's Tale" is known as a "cradle-trick" story, where a wife gets into the wrong bed because the cradle has been moved. "Cradle-trick" tales were popular all over Europe in the Middle Ages. One such story is the 13th-century French Le meunier et les II clers. In Le meunier et les II clers, the clerks are new to the area and looking for jobs as bakers. The miller has his wife send them into the woods to look for him while he steals their goods. They come back and end up spending a night with the family, and find that the miller's daughter spends every night locked in a bin to protect her chastity. During the night, the miller's wife has sex with one of the clerks in exchange for a ring which will restore her virginity. She then gives the clerk the key to her daughter's bin and invites him to have sex with her. The miller later finds out and accuses his wife, only to have her reveal that he is a robber. Other "cradle-trick" tales include the French De Gombert et des deux clers, a Flemish tale: Ein bispel van ij clerken, and two German tales: Das Studentenabenteuer and Irregang und Girregar.

== Analysis ==
=== Malyne ===
There is ongoing debate about the nature of the sex that Malyne has with Aleyn. Some argue that, although she is surprised at the beginning, by the end of the night she seems to be in love with Aleyn. Evidence for this reading includes the fact that she calls him her "lemman" after the fact, says a genuine fond farewell to him and tells where the cake made out of his stolen flour is hidden. Others emphasize that Aleyn, by surprising Malyne and entering her before she has the chance to consent or not, prevents her from consenting, which makes the sex rape. Nicole Nolan Sidhu takes a different angle and argues that this scene stages tensions between Christian doctrine and social practices over women's free will in marriage. Malyne's parallel in The Decameron also finds the night enjoyable after some initial fear and is eager for future meetings with the clerk. By removing this from his version of the tale, Chaucer creates a more ambiguous and unsettling ending. However, Aleyn has a university course to complete so will be remaining in Cambridge for some time, leaving the possibility of a lasting relationship open.

Malyne is called "this wench" at line 3973, which has been sometimes used to suggest that she is "immoral" or "wanton", and perhaps therefore enjoys her night. However, definitions for "wench" in the Middle English Dictionary primarily suggest a woman's youth and lower class status (although they secondarily can also suggest sexual servitude).

=== Satiric aube ===
As morning approaches, Aleyn and Malyne have an exchange of feelings which scholars have described as a mock aube or dawn-song, where two lovers express their sorrow at parting in the morning after a night together. Chaucer himself used aube elsewhere, for example in his Troilus and Criseyde. This type of love poem was usually written in a very high, courtly style and the characters in them were usually knights and ladies, but in this tale Chaucer brings it down to the level of a fabliau, which gives it a strong satire. For example, Aleyn, instead of saying to Malyne, "I am thyn own knight", says "I am thyn own clerk" (emph. added), and Malyne, between emotional words of parting, tells Aleyn about a bread in the mill—an odd fixture in any love poem. (This may be a slang term for pregnancy, similar to the modern "bun in the oven", a further humiliation to the Miller.)

== Adaptations ==
"The Reeve's Tale" is one of eight of Chaucer's stories adapted by Pier Paolo Pasolini in The Canterbury Tales. Patrick Duffett portrays Alan, Eamann Howell portrays John, the Italian producer/actor Tiziano Longo portrays Simkin the Miller, Eileen King portrays his wife and Heather Johnson portrays Molly.

== See also ==
- Bed trick
- Middle English – English language during the Middle Ages
