= Apparitor =

Type of civil servant in ancient Rome

In ancient Rome, an apparitor (also spelled apparator in English, or shortened to paritor) was a civil servant whose salary was paid from the public treasury. The apparitores assisted the magistrates. There were four occupational grades (decuriae) among them. The highest-ranked were the scribae, the clerks or public notaries, followed by the lictores, lictors; viatores, messengers or summoners, that is, agents on official errands; and praecones, announcers or heralds.

The term has hence referred to a beadle in a university, a pursuivant or herald; particularly, in Roman Catholic canon law, which was largely inspired by Roman law.

Apparitors (sometimes called summoners) continued to serve as officers in ecclesiastical courts. They were designated to serve the summons, to arrest a person accused, and in ecclesiastico-civil procedure, to take possession, physically or formally, of property in dispute, in order to secure the execution of the judge's sentence. This was done in countries where the ecclesiastical forum, in its substantial integrity, is recognized. An apparitor thus acted as constable and sheriff. His guarantee of his delivery of the summons provided evidence of a party's knowledge of his obligation to appear, either to stand trial, to give testimony, or to do whatever else might be legally enjoined by the judge; the apparitor's statement becomes the basis of a charge of contumacy against anyone refusing to obey a summons. Offenses dealt with by such courts included "sins of immorality, witchcraft, usury, simony, neglect of the sacraments, and withholding tithes or offering".
