= Children's Film Foundation filmography =

This article is a list of films produced, distributed or sponsored by the Children's Film Foundation.

== Films ==
Date	Title	Director	Notes	Ref(s)
1952	The Stolen Plans	James Hill	Feature film	
1952	Our Magazine No.1	Jimmy E. Ewins	Magazine short	
1952	Our Magazine No.2	Jimmy E. Ewins	Magazine short	
1952	Our Magazine No.3	Jimmy E. Ewins	Magazine short	
1952	Our Magazine No.4	Jimmy E. Ewins	Magazine short	
1952	To The Rescue	Jacques Brunius	Short	
1952	Rover Makes Good	John Dooley	Short	
1952	Stable Rivals	Leonard Reeve	Short	
1952	Swift Water	Tony Thompson	Short	
1953	John of the Fair	Michael McCarthy	Feature film	
1953	Our Magazine No.5	Jimmy E. Ewins	Magazine short	
1953	Bouncer Breaks Up!	Don Chaffey	Short	
1953	Heights of Danger	David Eady	Feature film	
1953	Johnny on the Run	Lewis Gilbert	Feature film	
1953	Skid Kids	Don Chaffey	Feature film	
1953	Mardi and Monkey	Kay Mander	Short	
1953	The Dog and the Diamonds	Ralph Thomas	Feature film	
1953	Juno Helps Out	William Hammond	Short	
1953	The Clue of the Missing Ape	James Hill	Feature film	
1953	The Secret Cave	John Durst	Feature film	
1953	A Letter from the Isle of Wight	Brian Salt	Short	
1953	A Letter from East Anglia	Cynthia Whitby	Short	
1953	A Letter from Wales	George Lloyd	Short	
1953	A Good Pull-up	Don Chaffey	Short	
1953	Watch Out	Don Chaffey	Short	
1954	A Letter from Ayrshire	Jimmy E. Ewins	Short	
1954	Our Magazine No.6	Jimmy E. Ewins	Magazine short	
1954	Adventure in the Hopfields	John Guillermin	Feature film	
1958	The Adventures of Hal 5	Don Sharp		
1959	The Adventures of Rex	Leonard Reeve	5-part serial	
1961	Ali and the Camel	Henry Geddes	8-part serial	
1970	All at Sea	Kenneth Fairbairn		
1966	Ambush at Devil's Gap	David Eastman	6-part serial	
1972	Anoop and the Elephant	David Eady		
1974	Avalanche	Frederic Goode		
1976	The Battle of Billy's Pond			
1963	Beware of the Dog			
1968	The Big Catch			
1979	Big Wheels and Sailor			
1955	Black in the Face			
1979	Black Island			
1977	Blind Man's Bluff			
1972	Blinker's Spy Spotter			
1959	Blow Your Own Trumpet			
1972	The Boy Who Turned Yellow	Michael Powell		
1974	The Boy with Two heads		Serial	
1983	Breakout			
1961	Bungala Boys			
1967	Calamity the Cow			
1974	The Camerons			
1958	The Carrington School Mystery		Serial	
1958	The Cat Gang			
1960	Caught in the Net			
1978	The Chiffy Kids		Serial	
1978	Chimpmates		Serial	
1966	The Christmas Tree			
1957	Circus Friends			
1976	The Copter Kids			
1967	Countdown to Danger			
1970	Crime Doesn't Pay			
1968	Cry Wolf			
1965	Cup Fever	David Bracknell		
1980	Danger on Dartmoor	David Eady		
1971	Danger Point!			
1967	Danny the Dragon		Serial	
1965	Davy Jones' Locker			
1959	The Dawn Killer		Serial	
1964	Daylight Robbery			
1978	Deep Waters			
1970	Don't Make Me Laugh			
1970	Dressura			
1964	Eagle Rock			
1976	Echo of The Badlands			
1970	Egghead's Robot			
1979	Electric Eskimo			
1968	Escape from the Sea			
1976	Fern the Red Deer			
1961	A Film For Maria			
1975	The Firefighters			
1957	Five Clues to Fortune		Serial	
1964	Five Have a Mystery to Solve		Serial	
1954	Five O'Clock Finish			
1957	Five on a Treasure Island		Serial	
1971	Five Survive			
1966	Flash the Sheep Dog			
1963	The Flood			
1955	The Flying Eye			
1973	The Flying Sorcerer			
1972	Forest Pony			
1961	Four Winds Island		Serial	
1982	Friend or Foe			
1984	Gabrielle and the Doodleman			
1967	A Ghost of a Chance			
1967	The Ghost of Monk's Island		Serial	
1977	The Glitterball			
1964	Go Kart Go			
1953	A Good Pull-up			
1968	The Great Pony Raid			
1984	Haunters of the Deep	Andrew Bogle		
1968	Headline Hunters			
1972	Hide and Seek	David Eady		
1980	High Rise Donkey	Michael Forlong		
1975	Hijack!	Michael Forlong		
1978	A Hitch in Time			
1979	A Horse Called Jester			
1975	The Hostages	David Eady		
1969	Hoverbug			
1967	The Hunch	Sarah Erulkar		
1960	Hunted in Holland			
1972	I Had a Hippopotamus			
1971	The Johnstown Monster	Olaf Pooley		
1970	Junket 89	Peter Plummer	Linda Robson and Pauline Quirke, from Anna Scher Children's Theatre	
1972	Kadoyng			
1957	The Kid from Canada	Kay Mander		
1961	The Last Rhino			
1968	Lionheart	Michael Forlong		
1968	The Magnificent Six and a Half		Serial	
1974	The Man from Nowhere	James Hill	Ronald Adam and Jennie Linden	
1962	Masters of Venus		Serial	
1972	Mauro the Gypsy			
1980	The Mine and the Minotaur			
1969	Mischief			
1961	The Missing Note			
1971	Mr Horatio Knibbles			
1978	Mr Selkie			
1961	The Monster of Highgate Ponds	Alberto Cavalcanti		
1959	The Mystery in the Mine		Serial	
1954	Mystery on Bird Island			
1962	Night Cargoes	Ernest Morris	8-part serial	
1976	Night Ferry	David Eady		
1976	Nosey Dobson	Michael Alexander		
1968	On the Run	Pat Jackson		
1976	One Hour to Zero	Jeremy Summers		
1956	One Wish Too Many	John Durst		
1966	Operation Third Form	David Eady		
1973	Paganini Strikes Again			
1978	The Pergrine Hunters			
1956	Peril for the Guy			
1962	The Piper's Tune			
1978	Play Safe			
1955	Playground Express			
1984	Pop Pirates			
1974	Professor Popper's Problem		Serial	
1983	Professor Potter's Magic Potions		Serial	
1956	Raiders of the River		Serial	
1972	Raising the Roof	Michael Forlong		
1963	The Rescue Squad			
1967	River Rivals		Serial	
1975	Robin Hood Junior		Last major acting role for Keith Chegwin as the titular character	
1960	Rockets in the Dunes			
1965	Runaway Railway			
1958	The Salvage Gang	John Krish		
1978	Sammy's Super T-Shirt	Jeremy Summers		
1976	Saturday Special			
1970	Scramble	David Eady		
1972	Seal Island			
1956	The Secret of the Forest			
1964	Seventy Deadly Pills			
1971	The Ski Wheelers			
1967	The Sky Bike	Charles Frend		
1977	Sky Pirates			
1974	Smokey Joe's Revenge			
1957	Soapbox Derby			
1966	Son of the Sahara		Serial	
1955	The Stolen Airliner			
1953	The Stolen Plans			
1973	Summer Holiday			
1956	Supersonic Saucer	S. G. Fergusson		
1971	That's All We Need			
1955	That's An Order			
1962	They Found a Cave			
1983	Tightrope to Terror			
1955	Tim Driscoll's Donkey			
1971	Time Flies			
1958	Toto and the Poachers			
1956	Treasure at the Mill			
1963	Treasure in Malta		6-part serial	
1972	The Trouble with 2B	Peter K. Smith	6-part serial, follow-on from Junket 89 above, also Anna Scher Theatre	
1967	The Troublesome Double			
1976	The Unbroken Arrow		Serial	
1971	Up the Creek			
1969	Up in the Air			
1964	Valley of the Kings		Serial	
1953	Watch Out			
1974	What Next?			
1974	Where's Johnny?			
1963	Wings of Mystery			
1972	Wreck Raisers			
1963	The Young Detectives		Serial	
1959	The Young Jacobites	John Reeve	Serial in 8 episodes	
1973	The Zoo Robbery	John Black and Matt McCarthy		
1981	4D Special Agents	Harold Orton	Won the 1982 Diploma of Honour at Gijón International Film Festival	
1985	Terry on the Fence	Frank Godwin	Adapted from a novel by Bernard Ashley	
1985	Out of the Darkness	John Krish		
1985	Our Exploits At West Poley			

== As UK distributor ==
Date	Title	Original Title	Director	Notes	Ref(s)
1947		Bush Christmas	Ralph Smart		
1951		Kekec	Jože Gale	Dubbed into English from Slovene	
1955	The Big Fish	Dobrodružství Na Zlaté Zátoce	Břetislav Pojar	Dubbed into English from Czech	
1958	Skinny and Fatty	Chibideka monogatari	Jukichi Uno	Dubbed into English from Japanese	
1963	Mountain of Fear	Srečno, Kekec!	Jože Gale	Dubbed into English from Slovene	
1967	Tanya and the two gunmen	Táňa a dva pistolníci	Radim Cvrček	Dubbed into English from Czech	
1972		Rangi's Catch	Michael Forlong	Sponsor and UK distributor	

- Danger on the Danube; original: Négyen az árban (1961)
- The Intruders (1969)
- The Mysterious Wreck; original (German): Das Geheimnisvolle Wrack (1954)
- Ptisi Dolitat Do Nas (1971)
