= Friday Film Special =

BBC1 children's programming slot (1985–1989)

The Friday Film Special was a slot for children on the UK television network BBC1, shown between 1985 and 1989.

Every Friday during each season, they showed a children's film, made by the Children's Film Foundation. The films were mostly from the 1970s and 1980s, with some from the 1960s.

Here is a list of some of the films that were screened:

- Sammy's Super T-Shirt (1978)
- 4-D Special Agent (1981)
- Tightrope to Terror (1982)
- Cry Wolf (1968)
- Fern the Red Deer (1976)
- Paganini Strikes Again (1973)
- A Hitch in Time (1978)
- Sky Pirates (1976)
- One Hour to Zero (1976)
- Haunters of The Deep (1984)
- The Boy Who Turned Yellow (1972)
- The Glitterball (1977)
