= Professor Popper's Problem =

1975 British children's science fiction comedy film

- Post-1989 title frame
- Directed by: Gerry O'Hara
- Screenplay by: Leo Maguire
- Story by: Richard Loncraine
- Produced by: Roy Simpson
- Starring: Charlie Drake; Adam Richens; Debra Collins; Philip da Costa
- Cinematography: Ken Hodges
- Edited by: James Needs
- Music by: Kenneth V. Jones
- Production companies: Mersey Film Productions; Children's Film Foundation
- Distributed by: BBC (1984); Cineplex-Odeon Home Video (1989); MCA Home Video (1989)
- Release date: 1 January 1975
- Running time: 91 minutes
- Country: United Kingdom
- Language: English
- Budget: £250,000

Professor Popper's Problem (Note: In 1989, the film was distributed in Canada on VHS by Cineplex-Odeon Home Video and MCA Home Video as Professor Popper's Problems. The same title was adopted in the United States, where it was broadcast on The Disney Channel. These North American versions followed confusion over the film's title in British references; Problems was routinely cited even prior to the picture's export, while other misnomers have included Professor Popper's Pills and Professor Popper's Potions.) is a 1975 (Note: Denis Gifford offers a specific release date of 1 January 1975, while John Bannister erroneously gives January 1974, the film being far from completed at this time. Sources are divided on which of the two years is correct. Gifford reasserts 1975 in Drake's obituary, joined by film writer Howard Maxford and The Daily Mirror reporter Kenneth Hughes; 1974 is given by most other sources, although reruns have had the picture wrongly dated to both 1984 and 1988.) British children's science fiction comedy film directed by Gerry O'Hara, starring Charlie Drake in the title role. Featuring a number of child actors, Todd Carty, Milo O'Shea, and Sydney Bromley also appear. The serial picture was produced for the Children's Film Foundation (CFF) by Roy Simpson of Mersey Film Productions, presenting a screenplay by Leo Maguire and soundtrack by Kenneth V. Jones. The story concerns an eccentric science teacher named Professor P. Popper, miniaturised with a group of pupils after accidentally consuming shrinking pills. A student apart from the group volunteers her help, as, separately, does a colleague of Popper's. As they search for an antidote, Popper and his entourage must see off multiple dangers, including criminals determined to steal his shrinking formula.

Filmed at Elstree Studios in Hertfordshire, Professor Popper's Problem was serialised into six 14 to 16 minute episodes for television viewing. Akin to other CFF features of the 1970s, the film broke with the Foundation's earlier releases by accurately representing aspects of working-class Britain, albeit through a science fiction narrative. Though restricted by a small budget, props and special effects defined the film; in this respect, O'Hara praised Tom Howard for his work on the picture. Reviews have been few and mixed from its release on 1 January 1975. Upon immediate showings, the film was characterised as unpretentious entertainment. Conversely, the picture has since been appraised as a low-point in Drake's career, simply by his agreeing to act in something perceived as so small. These criticisms have nevertheless been matched by retrospective assessments approving of the film's realistic depictions of 1970s Britain, in addition to Drake's subsequent theatrical roles.

== Plot ==
In a British suburban community, groundskeeper Crickle prepares for a school's re-opening after the holidays. One of its staff, Professor P. Popper, is a diminutive and bespectacled science teacher who is extremely eccentric. Amid brewing potions and a crowded chalkboard, he is accompanied in his jumbled workspace by a talking bird and an affectionate dog. Popper exhibits forgetful and repetitive behaviours, misremembering names and intermittently singing a ditty about Napoleon. In an elaborate bid to eradicate world hunger, he invents a shrinking powder, which when sprayed on vast food stocks facilitates a size reduction that allows for transportation by a single airplane. An antidote would also be provided, restoring the aid to its original dimensions once deployed. Popper and his pupil protégé, Simon, accidentally consume the powder in pill-form after it finds its way into their mugs of tea. A wider group of Popper's student assistants—Terry, Angus, Carol, and Peter—mistakenly join the pair in their predicament after searching for them. However, Liz, another of the Professor's tutees, avoids the fate of her classmates and is consequently tasked with helping them in their plight. Initially confined to Popper's chaotic laboratory, the affected group are now two inches tall, each the size of an insect. Their environment is greatly altered as a result; a book is now like a cliff edge, the rotary dial resembles a carousel, pennies are the size of hula hoops and a cat's paw is as large as a Ford Transit.

Unconcerned, the Professor is happy to sing to his students about the benefits of their newfound scale. Popper's colleague, Professor Crabbit (dressed in the attire of Sherlock Holmes), meanwhile sets about investigating what has happened to the cohort, arousing the suspicion of local man Rollins. Having misplaced the antidote to his formula, Popper's shrinking powder further becomes a prime target of theft. Covert Russian operatives bent on industrial espionage and a London gang, the latter sporting two crooks sent to miniaturise the Bank of England and sell it to the United States in a suitcase, initiate their pursuits. The danger is eventually supplemented by the Professor's group being chased by an enlarged tarantula, as well as a perilous roller skate ride through the capital. Still, the formula is protected by Popper through this trepidation, and all the villains' plans are ultimately thwarted. Having finally discovered an antidote, normality resumes for the schoolchildren and their teacher.

== Cast ==
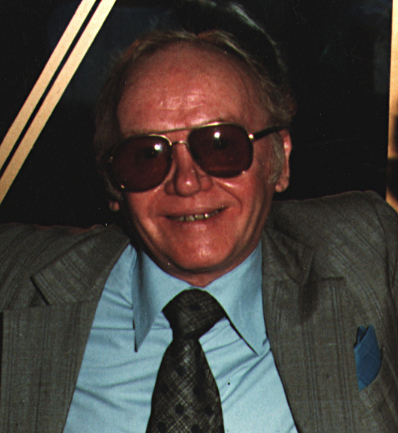
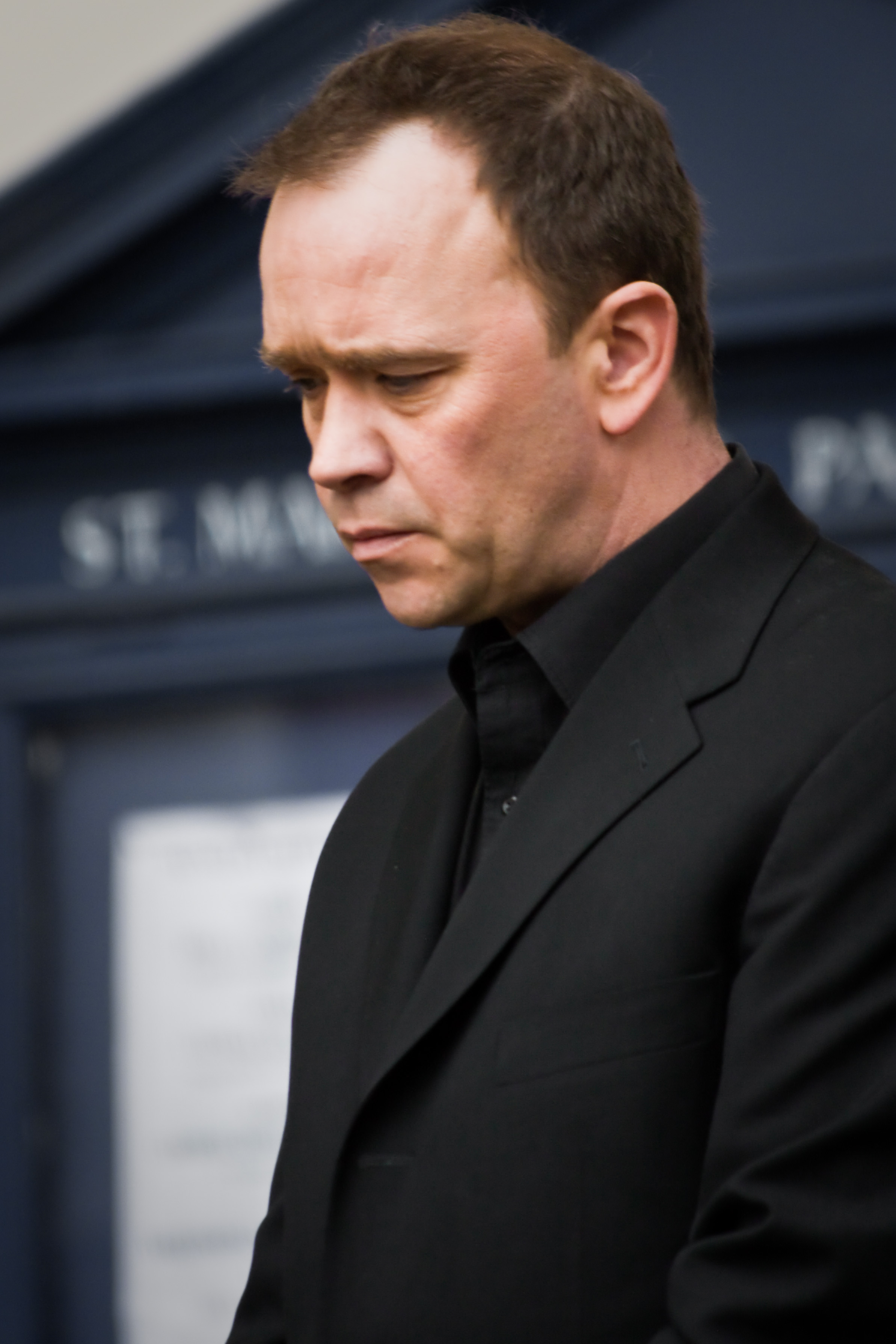
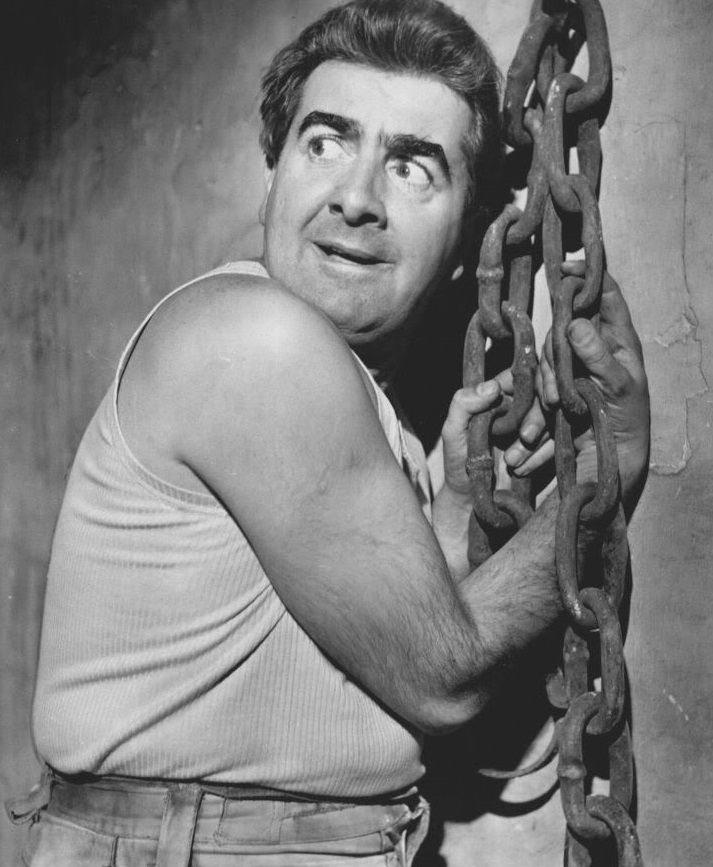
Among others, the film features Charlie Drake (left, 1986), Todd Carty (centre, 2009), and Milo O'Shea (right, 1967)

The film's cast comprises:

- Charlie Drake as Professor P. Popper
- Adam Richens as Simon
- Debra Collins as Liz
- Philip da Costa as Terry
- Todd Carty as Angus
- Karen Saunders as Carol
- Eric Holloway as Peter
- Milo O'Shea as Professor Crabitt
- Sydney Bromley as Crickle
- Richard Caldicot as headmaster
- Alan Curtis as Grainger
- Leo Maguire as Rollins
- Keith Smith as Police Constable Whitby
- Ruth Kettlewell as meter maid

== Production ==
=== Development and direction ===
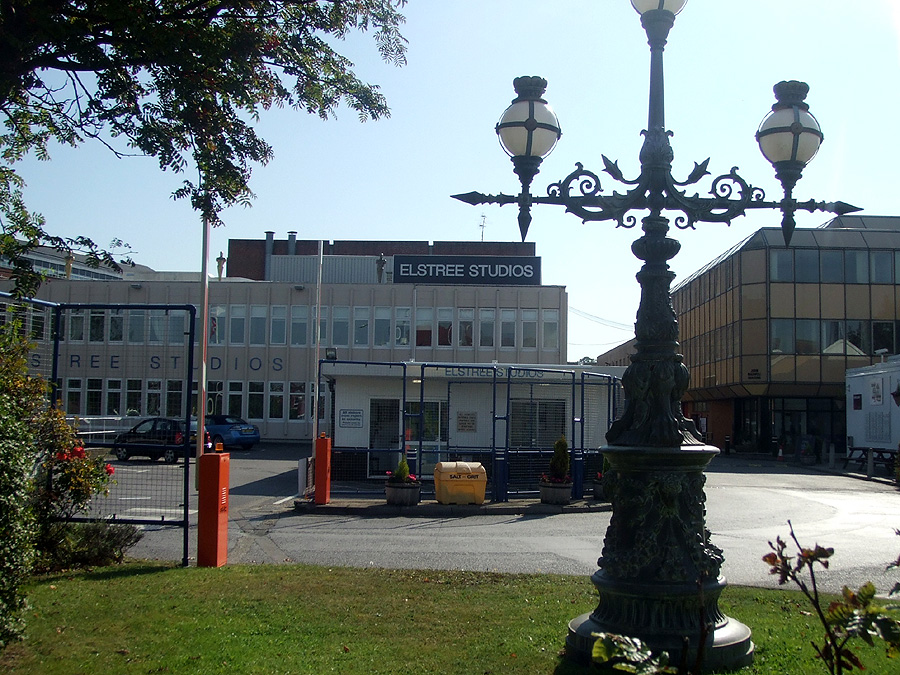
Elstree Studios in Hertfordshire (pictured in 2011)

Filmed in 1974 at Elstree Studios in Borehamwood, Hertfordshire, Professor Popper's Problem was serialised into six colour episodes suitable for television. Eventually bought by the BBC in 1984, each run between 14 and 16 minutes for a total viewing time of 91 minutes. (Note: Stored on Eastman film, these shorts are, in narrative order: Into the Unknown (15 minutes), Descent to Danger (16 minutes), The Monster (16 minutes), Pursued (15 minutes), Follow that Skate (15 minutes) and The Magic Powder (14 minutes). Sandra Brennan of AllMovie incorrectly notes a collective running time of 90 minutes.) The picture was made by Mersey Film Productions for the Children's Film Foundation (CFF), with Roy Simpson as producer, Roy Parkinson as associate producer, and Peter Woodley as production executive. Assisted by David Bracknell, Gerry O'Hara directed, likely re-hired by the CFF owing to his success on their earlier project Paganini Strikes Again (1973). One of O'Hara's chief responsibilities was to oversee Charlie Drake's well-being throughout production, recalling a daily routine that involved driving to Elstree and back from Drake's flat near Leicester Square and lunching with him. The picture turned out to be the entertainer's last, as well as the only one which he did not write or co-write while holding a major role. Released on 1 January 1975, the British Board of Film Classification (BBFC) deemed the film "Universal" (U) and thus suitable for all viewers. The Motion Picture Association's (MPA) film rating system, however, has not yet classified the film, and it is therefore listed as Not Rated (NR).

=== Screenplay and visuals ===
The screenplay was written by Leo Maguire, based on an original story by Richard Loncraine. Maguire previously worked with producer Simpson on CFF film Kadoyng (1972), "demonstrating the Foundation's preference for familiar faces". Ian Millsted of Infinity magazine notes that CFF screenplays of the 1970s—including Professor Popper's Problem—remedied critiques of its features of the 1950s and 60s, which suggested "that they seemed to be set on an alien world where all the children spoke the Queen’s English [...], behaved with impeccable morals and were routinely smarter than any adult". According to Millsted, this was achieved by deploying "noticeably more regional accents and working class characters", relegating science-fiction elements to jovial plot points rather than intrinsic storylines. Notwithstanding, "gadgets and gimmicks became the order of the day". In this Professor Popper's Problem was typical, using special effects by Tom Howard and deliberately oversized props on a "very small budget" of £250,000. (Note: £250,000 in 1974 equated approximately to £2,625,000 in 2019; this figure accounts for the increase in Retail Price Index (RPI) percentage between the two years.) O'Hara remarked that many props were borrowed since "nobody minded really as it was a CFF film", also praising Howard, "who was really talented at making the money go a long way". Edited by James Needs, Ken Hodges was responsible for the picture's photography, joined by George Provis as art director and Tony Hart on title design.

=== Music ===
The film's music was organised by Kenneth V. Jones, providing audio alongside sound recorder Laurie Clarkson. Drake sang the film's theme, "I'm Big Enough for Me", opined by writers Ian Jones and Graham Kibble-White to be a quintessential "celebrity sing-a-long [...] the blessing of a star-led knees up". The lead "affected his best nasal upper-class vibrato", they observe, "cementing an otherwise unremarkable theme in the heads of a generation of viewers". The song was also significant insofar as it became the B-side to Drake's track "You Never Know", released on 21 November 1975, notably featuring backing vocals by Peter Gabriel. Sandy Denny also sang a section in this latter tune, with instrumentals by Robert Fripp, Keith Tippett, Phil Collins, and Percy Jones.

== Response ==
Leading up to release, Associated Television's Clapperboard, a children's cinema program, covered the film in November 1974. This was followed in 1975 by two appearances on BBC quiz show Screen Test. Most journalistic assessments in the 1970s and 80s presented it as an amiable comedy without profundity. Sidney Williams, Show Business Reporter for the Daily Mirror in May 1974, wrote that "[Drake] expresses the modest hope that audiences will be reduced only to laughter. In short, it's fun". Come February 1980, the pseudonymous "Professor Bullseye" had a similar view in the Acton Gazette & Post, simply recommending the film as "good entertainment". In a balanced retrospective review, AllMovie's Sandra Brennan awarded Professor Popper's Problem 2.5/5 stars without extra comment.

More modern reviews have been somewhat sceptical. TV Cream affords a cynical synopsis: "[Drake] notes a worrying hole in his pension plan and promptly accedes to star in this tatty affair". Indeed, most commentary on the picture has focused on the seemingly waning career of Drake as a result of his participation. A popular entertainer in Britain throughout the 1960s, he was perhaps best known for starring in the original run of ITV series The Worker (1965–70). Williams noted accordingly that Professor Popper's Problem was, while a "minor peak" for Drake, "without question the smallest thing he ha[d] ever done". Media historians Brian McFarlane and Anthony Slide, listing the feature, disapprove of Drake's venture into films more generally: "short of stature, outrageous of demeanour and bizarre of accent, he is clearly an acquired taste; cinema audiences never acquired it in great numbers".

Conversely, in an interview piece with Drake issued in April 1984, the Liverpool Echo opined the supposed triviality of the film to be a "red herring", the actor having targeted more theatrical roles. (Note: 1983 saw Drake earn critical acclaim for playing Davies in Harold Pinter's The Caretaker at the Royal Exchange, Manchester. This prompted the BBC to cast him as Smallweed in their 1985 television adaptation of Charles Dickens' Bleak House. With this, Bannister opines Drake "was well on the way to successfully reinventing himself as a dramatic actor".) Drake nonetheless defended the movie's sincerity: "Popper is a serious character, not really a comedy man. It is a serious subject, although in a comedy setting". In this vein, film scholar Robert Shail favours Professor Popper's Problem for compensating unsubtle humour with "settings around council estates and comprehensive schools [that] were often realistically observed and facilitated audience identification", also commending the inclusion of "authentic working-class accents".
