= Desmond Carrington =

British broadcaster and actor (1926–2017)

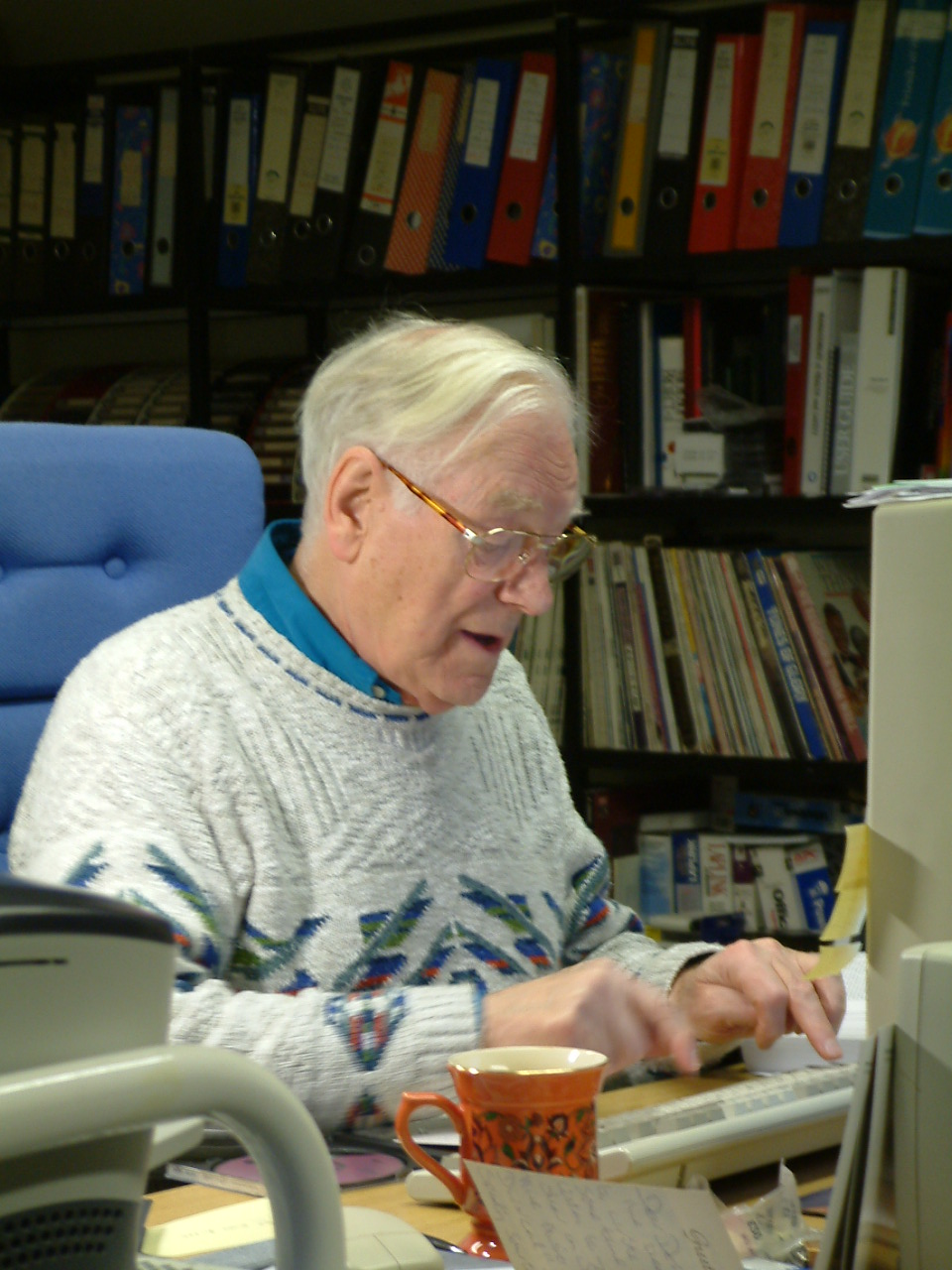
- Carrington in his home studio, 2003
- Born: Desmond Herbert Carrington; 23 May 1926; Bromley, Kent, England
- Died: 1 February 2017 (aged 90); Perth, Perthshire, Scotland
- Occupations: Radio Broadcaster, Actor
- Years active: 1942–2016 (retired)

Desmond Herbert Carrington (23 May 1926 – 1 February 2017) was a British broadcaster and actor whose career spanned 75 years. He was best known for his weekly show on BBC Radio 2 which aired for 35 years, from 4 October 1981 until his final broadcast on 28 October 2016. He appeared in such films as Calamity the Cow (1967) and also acted on TV, where he became known for his role as Dr. Anderson in Emergency Ward 10. He was born in Bromley, Kent, England and lived in Perth, Scotland from 1995 until his death.

== Career ==
Carrington's first professional appearance was in 1942, when he played Cockney schoolboy Roberts in a stage adaptation of James Hilton's novella Goodbye, Mr. Chips at the Theatre Royal, Nottingham, with Noel Johnson, as Mr. Chips – Johnson was the radio voice of Dick Barton. Carrington was conscripted into the army a year later, being commissioned into the Queen's Own Royal West Kent Regiment. At the end of World War II, he joined a British Forces Broadcasting Service (BFBS) radio station in Colombo, Ceylon (now Sri Lanka).

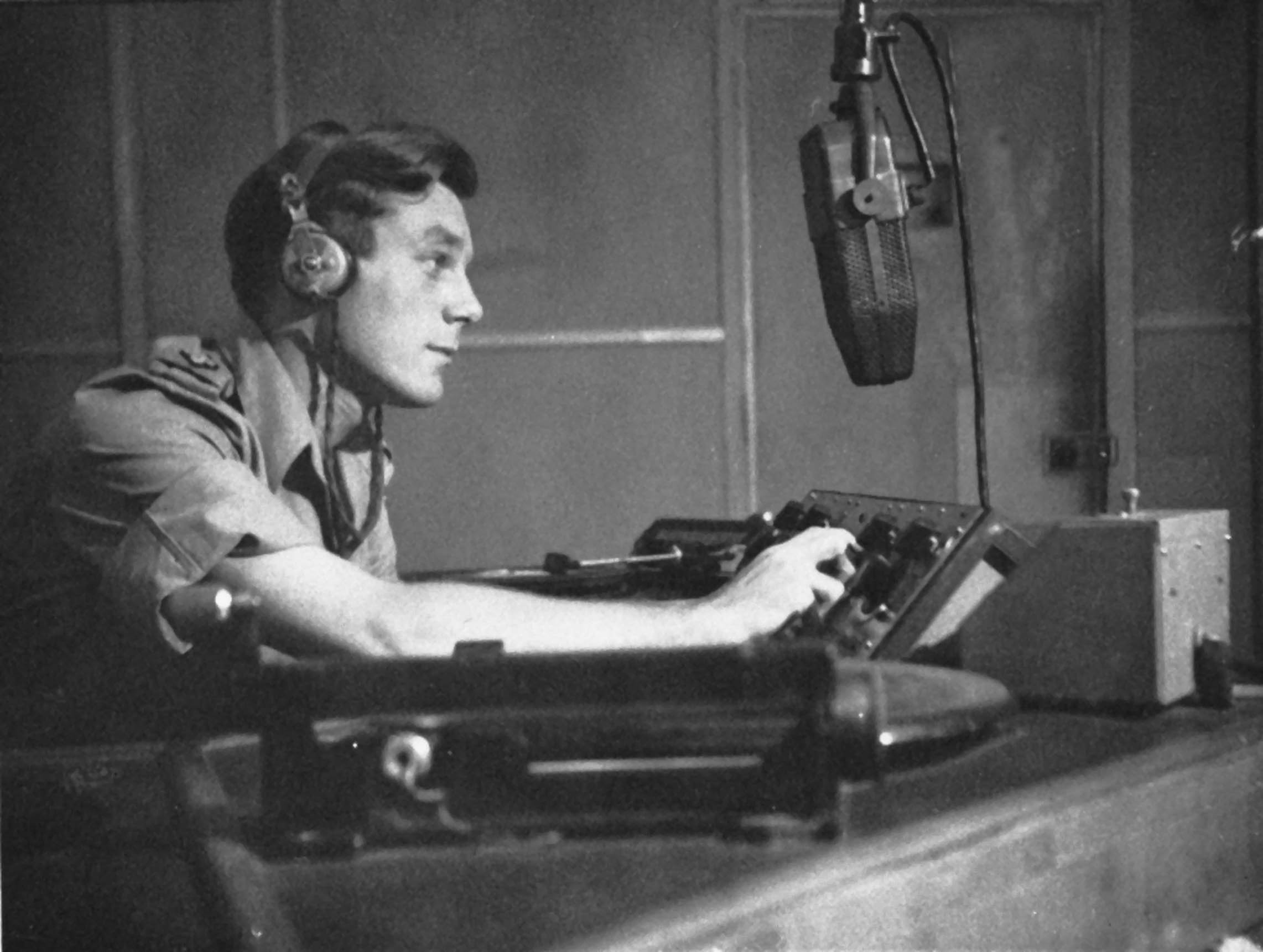
Carrington in 1946, British Forces Broadcasting Service (BFBS) radio station in Colombo, Ceylon

He returned to the UK a few years later and worked as a radio producer and acted on TV, where he became known for his role as Dr. Anderson in Emergency Ward 10. In 1949 he appeared as Ken in The People at No. 19, a short public information film warning of the potentially tragic effects of venereal disease on family life. In 1957 he starred in two of the thirteen A Case For Dr. Morelle radio shows, with Cecil Parker as the lead, and later appeared as Uncle Jim in the Children's Film Foundation film Calamity the Cow (1967), which starred a young Phil Collins. With Spencer Hale, Carrington presented Movie Go Round on the BBC Light Programme on Sunday afternoons in the 1950s.

Carrington as Dr Chris Anderson from the front cover of Emergency – Ward 10 Girls Annual (1960s)

Carrington's first show on BBC Radio 2 called All Time Greats ran from 4 October 1981 to 29 August 2004. It was broadcast for two hours every Sunday from 1 pm to 3 pm. Although initially pre-recorded and broadcast from a BBC studio, his first live broadcast from his home in Perthshire was on 31 August 1997, which was the day that Diana, Princess of Wales died and Carrington agreed that it would be inappropriate to use the pre-recorded show on that day. His second show on the network, The Music Goes Round, ran from 31 August 2004 until his final broadcast on 28 October 2016, and originally aired in an hourly slot on a Tuesday evening, from 7 pm to 8 pm, until it was moved to Friday evenings commencing on 9 April 2010. Both shows used a usual weekly theme of music, an occasional special 50s and musical editions. He introduced every show with the greeting "Evening all, from home in Perthshire" and then always ended his show with "Bye just now!" and "...of course, thank you for having us [the "us" emphasised] at your place" not forgetting a reference to his cat, "Golden Paws" Sam. Carrington used his personal collection of some 80,000 CDs, LPs and 78s. When he retired in 2016 the show was still attracting more than 800,000 listeners.

== Honours ==
He was awarded the Gold Badge of Merit in 1989 by the British Academy of Songwriters, Composers and Authors, and he was voted British Radio Personality of the Year in 1991.

== Retirement ==
On his show on 30 September 2016, Carrington confirmed his intention to hang up his headphones after three decades on the airwaves and presented his last show on 28 October 2016. He had suffered cancer and Alzheimer's disease for several years and suffered heart failure for the second time on Christmas Day 2015. He opened his last show with the same song that had opened 'All Time Greats' in 1981, "Up, Up and Away" by the Johnny Mann Singers, and closed it with Mel Tormé's "That's All". He thanked listeners, without whom, he said "the whole thing would have been quite pointless". Carrington was praised by Director-General of the BBC Tony Hall who said:

Desmond has made a huge contribution to BBC Radio as part of his remarkable 70-year career. He is a natural broadcaster who exudes great charm, and his weekly programme brings joy to listeners both at home and around the world. On behalf of everyone at Radio 2, the BBC and all of his millions of listeners, I'd like to thank him for his incredible service and wish him well.

== Death ==
Carrington died on 1 February 2017 at the age of 90. His death was announced on BBC Radio 2's 8:00pm news bulletin and it was stated that he had been battling both cancer and Alzheimer's disease for several years. His partner and producer Dave Aylott said he had died peacefully. A pre-arranged tribute programme, Desmond Carrington – All Time Great, was broadcast by BBC Radio 2 on the evening of his death. The Bodleian Library is now in receipt of material relating to Carrington's professional life, including BBC Radio 2 scripts and music reports, with some correspondence and press cuttings, from 1937 to 2017.
