= Kay Mander filmography =

This article is a list of films directed, supervised, produced, written or edited by Kay Mander

== Filmography ==
=== Filmography ===
Year	Title	Role	Notes	Ref(s)
1940	Transfer of Skill	Production Assistant	Short. Shell Film Unit	
1941	How to File	Director	Directorial debut	
1942	Mobilising Procedure	Director		
1942	Fruit Spraying	Director		
1943	Debris Tunnelling	Director		
1943	Highland Doctor: A Film of the Highlands & Islands Medical Service	Director and story		
1944	Penicillin	Co-director	With Alexander Shaw	
1944	New Builders	Director		
1945	Homes for the People	Director		
1946	Take Thou	Director		
1946	Twenty-four Square Miles	Director		
1948	La Famille Martin	Director and Editor		
1948	How What and Why No. 1	Producer		
1948	A Plan to Work On	Director and script		
1948	How What and Why No. 2	Producer		
1948	How What and Why No. 3	Producer		
1949	Cine Panorama	Director	Part of the Local Studies series for the Ministry of Information Visual Unit	
1949	Near Home	Director and writer		
1949	Histoire De Poissons	Director and Editor		
1950	Depart De Grandes Vacances	Director and Editor		
1950	Working in a Store	Director		
1951	Clearing the Lines	Director	Short, Part of the Changing Face of Europe documentary series	
1953	Mardi and Monkey	Director	Short, for the Children's Film Foundation	
1955	The New Boat	Director	Short	
1955	A Quiet Morning	Director	Short, sponsored by the Linguaphone Institute	
1957	The Kid From Canada	Director	For the Children's Film Foundation	
1957	Danger List	Continuity supervisor	Short	
1958	The Strange World of Planet X	Continuity supervisor		
1958	A Clean Sweep	Continuity supervisor	Short	
1960	Oscar Wilde	Continuity supervisor		
1961	The Snake Woman	Continuity supervisor		
1962	The Boys	Continuity supervisor		
1963	From Russia with Love	Continuity supervisor		
1963	The List of Adrian Messenger	Continuity supervisor		
1965	The Heroes of Telemark	Continuity supervisor		
1966	Dateline Diamonds	Continuity supervisor		
1966	Island of Terror	Continuity supervisor		
1966	Fahrenheit 451	Continuity supervisor	Uncredited	
1966	The Great Highway	Research and Treatment	Short. Directed by R.K. Neilson-Baxter	
1967	Danger Route	Continuity supervisor		
1972	Henry VIII and His Six Wives	Continuity supervisor		
1973	That'll Be the Day	Continuity supervisor		
1974	Mahler	Continuity supervisor		
1975	Tommy	Continuity supervisor		
1979	The Human Factor	Continuity supervisor		
1984	Where Is Parsifal?	Continuity supervisor		
1985	Plenty	Continuity supervisor		
1987	Straight to Hell	Continuity supervisor		
1987	Soweto	Continuity supervisor	Directed by Michael Raeburn	
1989	Play Me Something	Continuity supervisor		
1995	I Was Catherine the Great's Stable Boy	Continuity supervisor	Short	
2001	One Continuous Take - Kay Mander's Life in Film	Self	Directed by Adele Carroll	

=== Television ===
Year	Title	Role	Notes	Ref(s)
1986	The Madness Museum	Continuity supervisor	TV film	
1989	War, Peace and Pictures - The Films of Kay Mander	Self	Directed by Janey Walklin	
1994	The Spy Who Caught a Cold	Continuity supervisor	Short	
