= Frederick Treves =

Fredrick Treves may refer to:

- Sir Frederick Treves, 1st Baronet (1853–1923), English surgeon
- Frederick Treves (actor) (1925–2012), English actor
