= Julie Dawn Cole =

British actress (born 1957)

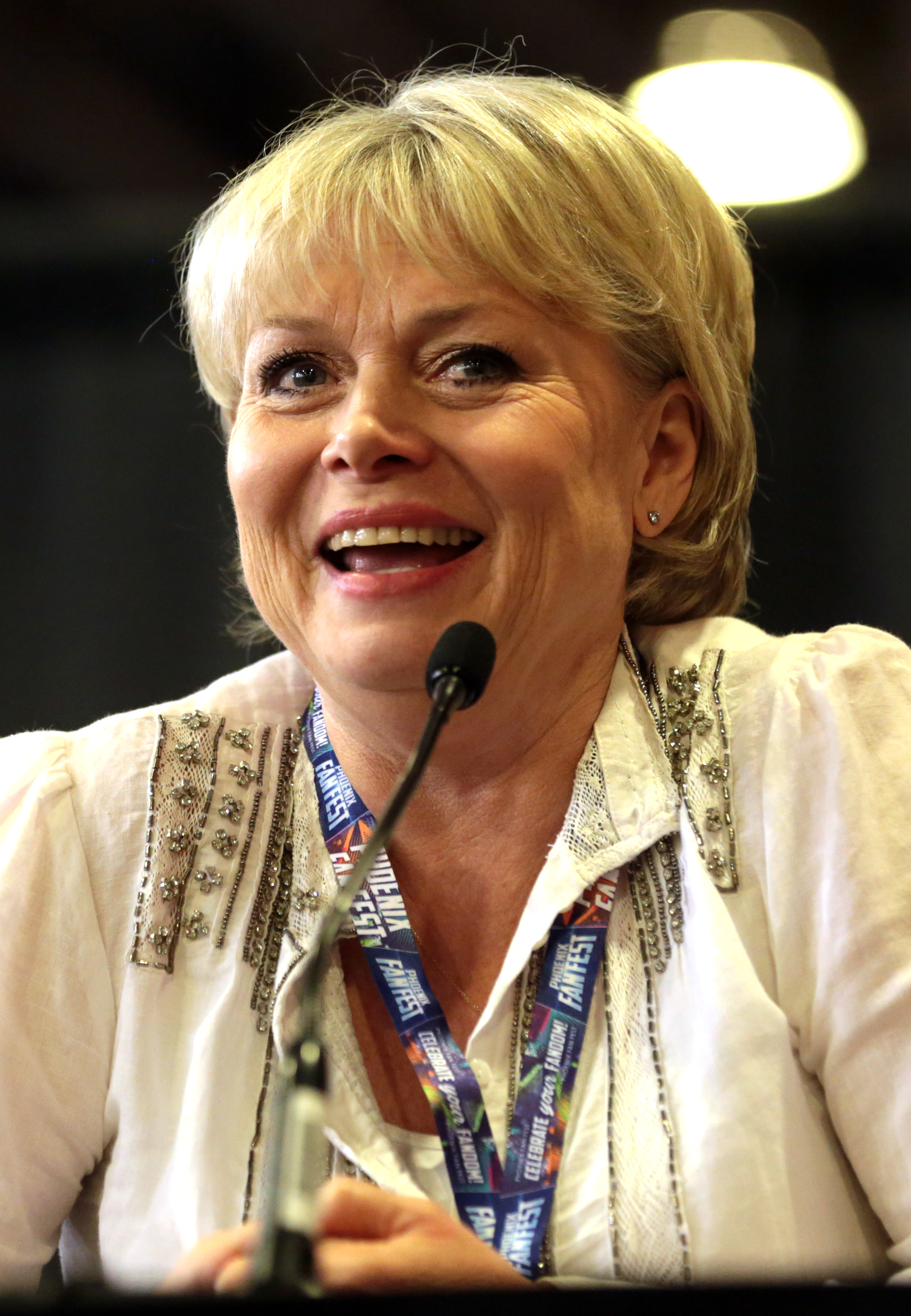
- Cole in 2017
- Born: 26 October 1957 (age 69); Guildford, Surrey, England
- Occupations: Actress; psychotherapist
- Years active: 1970–2013 (actress); 2007–present (psychotherapist)
- Known for: Veruca Salt in Willy Wonka & the Chocolate Factory (1971)
- Spouse: Nick Wilton (m. 1991; div. 2002)
- Children: 2

Julie Dawn Cole (born 26 October 1957) is an English actress and psychotherapist. She began her career as a child performer in the 1971 film Willy Wonka & the Chocolate Factory, playing Veruca Salt. Other roles include Arabella in ...And Mother Makes Three (1971–73), Jo Longhurst in Angels (1975–76), Rowella in Poldark (1977), Lucy Deane in The Mill on the Floss (1978).

== Career ==
Cole was raised in Guildford, Surrey. Cole was 12 when she was cast as Veruca Salt, during the preproduction phase in 1970, filmed at the Bavaria Film Studios; starring alongside Gene Wilder as Willy Wonka, and Roy Kinnear who played her character's father.

The film debuted in New York City on 30 June 1971 and in London the following week, and Cole was chosen to present a bouquet of flowers to Princess Margaret at the Royal Premiere. The film's other preadolescent "leading lady", American Denise Nickerson (Violet Beauregarde), and she both had a crush on the lead actor Peter Ostrum who played Charlie Bucket.

The "I Want It Now" sequence was filmed on her 13th birthday and Cole was given three film props: a golden egg prop, a golden ticket, and an Everlasting Gobstopper which she went on to sell years later and used the money for a vacation in Malaysia with her children.

Following the filming of the movie, Cole kept the Golden Ticket prop, along with the accompanying bar prop. She later gave it to her friend Linda Carr. On 17 July 2019, both props were sold at auction for upwards of £15,000. The auction itself is shown in BBC One's Bargain Hunt series 54, Ardingly 19.

=== After Willy Wonka ===
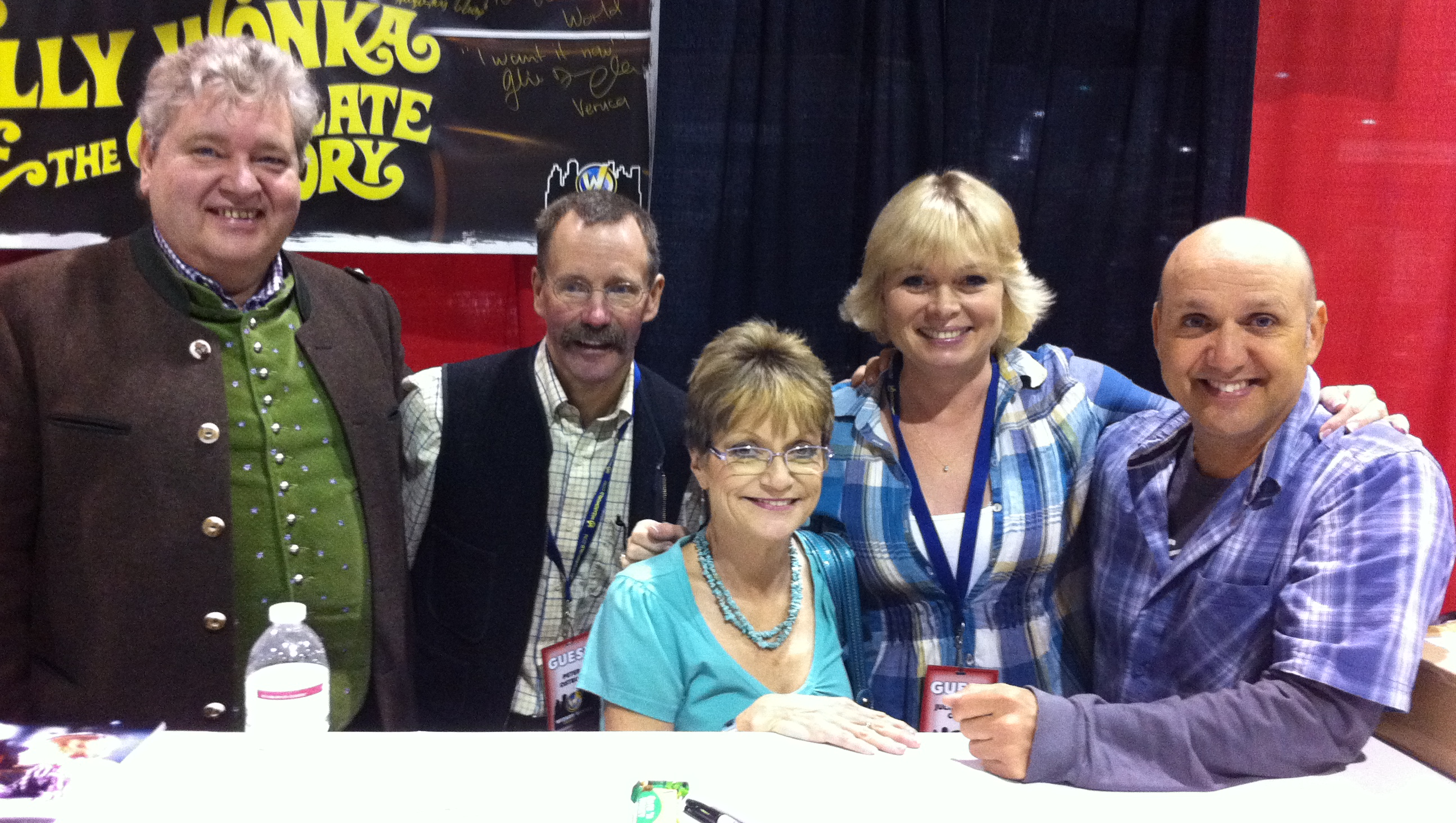
Cole (second from right) in 2011 with the Willy Wonka child cast

Immediately after returning from filming, Cole was cast in a recurring role on the ITV sitcom, ...And Mother Makes Three, in which she played Arabella, a stuck-up and snobbish teenaged girl.

From 1971 to 1974, she acted in several TV series, and was often cast as a "bad girl"; in an episode of ITV series Saturday Night Theatre, she played a delinquent who broke into a house, and a juvenile offender in an episode of prison drama series Within These Walls. Occasionally, she was cast in other moulds: on an episode of the Orson Welles' Great Mysteries series, she played a murder victim.

She made her next theatrical appearance in British-German comedy film That Lucky Touch, opposite Roger Moore. In this film, she played the daughter of the characters played by Shelley Winters and Lee J. Cobb. Julie also found recognition playing Alice (from Alice In Wonderland) in a two-minute Christmas commercial for Woolworths.

In 1975, Cole got her break-out role being cast as one of the leading characters in BBC medical drama Angels. Breaking the bad-girl mould, she played Jo Longhurst, a second-year student nurse. Her character was known for her compassion, kind nature, advocacy for patients, and challenging authority when it was questionable. Production of the show began in February 1975, and episodes started to air in September of that same year. Cole's run on the show lasted three years.

In 1976, Cole joined the cast of the costume drama Poldark for its second season. Reverting to her bad-girl mould, Cole played the salacious and lecherous Rowella Chynoweth, who engages in an affair with her brother-in-law (played by Christopher Biggins). Poldark was immensely popular and garnered much attention for its romantic, and at times racy, plot lines.

Her other credits include the Children's Film Foundation film Paganini Strikes Again (1973), a 1982 episode of Tales of the Unexpected ("The Skeleton Key"), and the 1984 TV film of Camille, starring Greta Scacchi and Colin Firth. She featured as 'Robot 35' in the CBBC comedy Galloping Galaxies!.

Furthermore, Cole has had a number of theatrical credits, as well as pantomime and voice-over work over the years. Cole has appeared on radio in BBC Radio 2 broadcasts of British panto, including 26 December 1979 broadcast of Puss in Boots as Princess Rosepetal, as Jill on 25 December 1981 broadcast of Mother Goose, and as Alice in the 27 December 1982 broadcast of Dick Whittington.

=== Career change, memoirs, and Willy Wonka ===
After qualifying in 1998 as a fitness instructor, she worked in the 2000s on various projects, including the 2005 ITV series Fat Families as fitness advisor to one of the title families. Additionally, Cole trained as a psychotherapist and started practicing in 2007.

Returning to Willy Wonka, in 2004, Cole guest-starred in a Melbourne Comedy Festival show, Willy Wonka Explained (The Search for Veruca Salt). This led to Cole co-starring in the 2010 Edinburgh Fringe show, Willy Wonka Revisited: The Veruca Salt Sessions, where she plays a semifictional version of herself discussing Veruca, life, and obsessive fans with her unseen therapist, while her co-star plays an Australian fan describing his obsession with Veruca to his unseen therapist.

In 2006, she was seen on the soap opera Emmerdale.

In 2016, Cole released the book I Want It Now!, a memoir about her time filming Willy Wonka.

In 2024, she returned to the Edinburgh Fringe with a role in Willy’s Candy Spectacular, a musical based on the infamous Willy’s Chocolate Experience.

In 2025, Cole promoted a multisensory Willy Wonka presentation at Cosm Los Angeles by reenacting the Golden Goose scene by testing herself on the Eggdicator at Cosm.

== Personal life ==
Cole met actor Nick Wilton in 1988, at the revival of the Whitehall farce Dry Rot. They married in 1991 and have two children together. They divorced in 2002. She has since remarried.

== Filmography ==
Year	Title	Role	Notes
1971	Willy Wonka & the Chocolate Factory	Veruca Salt	
1971–1972	...And Mother Makes Three	Arabella	5 episodes
1973	Paganini Strikes Again	Nichola	
1973	ITV Sunday Night Theatre	Helen	Episode: "The Intruders"
1973	Orson Welles Great Mysteries	Vera May Barton	Episode: "In the Confessional"
1974	My Old Man	Judy	1 episode
1974	CBS Children's Film Festival	Nicola	Episode: "Paganini Strikes Again"
1974	Living at Thamesmead	Sally Glock	Short film
1975	That Lucky Touch	Tina Steedman	
1975	Within These Walls	Gillian Parr	Episode: "My Dad Was Called Charlie"
1975–1976	Angels	Jo Longhurst	28 episodes
1977	Poldark	Rowella Solway	6 episodes
1977–1978	The Many Wives of Patrick	Madeline Woodford	4 episodes
1978	People Like Us	Hilda Gittens	TV Mini-series; Episode: "The First Lessons in Love"
1978, 2006	Emmerdale	Pip Coulter (1978), Barbara Hope (2006)	Two roles; 14 episodes
1979	The Mill on the Floss	Lucy Deane	5 episodes
1979	Dick Turpin	Phylida	Episode: "The Hero"
1980	Bernie	—N/a	1 episode
1980	Company and Co	Tina Clegg	Episode: "Watch the Birdie"
1980	The Jim Davidson Show	Guest	2 episodes
1980	Rings on Their Fingers	Pauline	Episode: "Ladies Man"
1980	Grundy	Sharon	6 episodes
1982	Tales of the Unexpected	Emma	Episode: "The Skeleton Key"
1982	Kelly Monteith	Guest	1 episode
1984	Camille	Julie	
1985	Up the Elephant and Round the Castle	Sue Brent	Episode: "Wakey Wakey"
1985	Terry and June	Lola	Episode: "Unfaithfully Yours"
1985–1986	Galloping Galaxies!	Robot 35	2 episodes
1987	Tandoori Nights	Sandra	Episode: "The Captains and the Kings Depart"
1987–2013	Casualty	Audrey Leavers, Lucy Roland, Jenny, Annie	4 episodes
1989	Bergerac	Reporter	Episode: "The Other Woman"
1991	EastEnders	Geraldine	2 episodes
1992	Moon and Son	Young Housewife	Episode: "The Chinese Medicine Man"
1992	Mr. Wakefield's Crusade	Marion (voice)	1 episode
1992	WYSIWYG	Maz	5 episodes
1992	The Upper Hand	Lyn	2 episodes
1995	The Politician's Wife	Angie	TV Mini-series; 2 episodes
1996	How to Be a Little Sod	Mother's Friend	Episode: "Don't Forget the Kitchen Sink"
1996	Married for Life	Judy Hollingsworth	6 episodes
1998	Animal Ark	Sylvia Greenaway	Episode: "Donkey on the Doorstep"
1998	Noah's Ark	Pam Fisher	Episode: "Killing Time"
2001	Doctors	Stella Jordan	Episode: "Mum's the Word"
2003	Down to Earth	Jean	Episode: "All Together Now"
2003	Fortysomething	Stella	1 episode
2004	The Second Quest	Mrs. Biggs	Television film
2006	Angel Cake	Judith	Television film
2009	Still Living at Thamesmead	Sally Glock	Short film
2009	Olivia		British dub
2012–2013	Holby City	Pam Feeny	2 episodes
