= Keith Jayne =

British actor (born 1960)

- Born: 10 December 1960 (age 64); Carlisle, Cumberland, England, UK
- Spouse: Samantha Leach

Keith Jayne (born 10 December 1960) is a British actor, known for playing the title role in the 1981 television adaptation Stig of the Dump.

A slow growth rate, due to a pituitary gland problem, made Keith a target of bullies at grammar school, To escape them, he enrolled with the Barbara Speake Stage School.

Early roles were in Rumpole of the Bailey, Angels and a variety of Children's Film Foundation productions, including Robin Hood Junior (1975), The Glitterball (1977) and Sammy's Super T-Shirt (1978). In 1974, Keith appeared as Wilfred Schoenfeld in an episode of Upstairs, Downstairs, entitled "The Beastly Hun". In 1975, he played Mick in Survivors.

However, his big break happened in 1979 when he was cast as Tom Arnold, a cabin boy, in The Onedin Line. This was followed by the lead role in Thames Television’s, BAFTA award nominated, adaptation of Stig of the Dump - which 'is probably the part I am most remembered for'.

Keith went on to play 'Boxer Reed' in all 54 episodes of Central TV's kid's drama, Murphy's Mob. His appearance as Will Chandler - 'one of the most convincing and memorable companions The Doctor never had' – in Doctor Who serial The Awakening, led producer John Nathan-Turner to briefly consider making Keith a series regular.

Typecasting (often as a yokel) persuaded Keith to study for a certificate in Finance and Investment. This coincided with a dark period his life, when his earlier health problems came back to haunt him. 'As a result of the growth hormone treatment I received as a child, I received a letter from the NHS saying I may have contracted CJD.'

Keith's high-profile saw him interviewed on ITN, a broadcast that curtailed his acting career. 'The fact that it was reported that I was dying did not help me get any further work as no casting director is going to employ you if there is a chance you will keel over before episode two.'

Beginning in the late 1980s, he ran a financial services business.

In 2009 he appeared as a guest in the 'Blast From The Past' section of The Justin Lee Collins Show.
