= Headline Hunters (1968 film) =

1968 British film by Jonathan Ingrams

- Opening titles
- Directed by: Jonathan Ingrams
- Written by: C.M. Pennington-Richards; Jonathan Ingrams
- Story by: Geoffrey Bond
- Produced by: Frank Godwin
- Starring: Leonard Brockwell; Susan Payne; Stephen Garlick
- Cinematography: Mark Mcdonald
- Edited by: Richard Mason
- Music by: Harry Robinson
- Production company: Ansus Films
- Distributed by: Children's Film Foundation (UK)
- Release date: September 1968 (UK)
- Running time: 60 minutes
- Country: United Kingdom
- Language: English

Headline Hunters is a 1968 British children's drama film directed by Jonathan Ingrams and starring Leonard Brockwell, Susan Payne, Stephen Garlick, Bill Owen, David Lodge and Frank Williams. It was distributed by the Children's Film Foundation.

== Plot ==
A bunch of kids help run the local newspaper after their father becomes ill. In the process they foil a robbery at a local factory.

== Cast ==
- Leonard Brockwell as Terry Hunter
- Susan Payne as Joan Hunter
- Stephen Garlick as Peter Hunter
- Jeffrey Chandler as Alec
- Bill Owen as Henry
- Reginald Marsh as Bogshot
- Keith Smith as Fustwick
- Glyn Houston as Gresham
- David Lodge as Harry
- Dermot Kelly as Ernie
- Frank Williams as Carter
- Malcolm Epstein as Percy
- David Beale as Hunter
- Maureen O'Reilly as Mrs. Hunter

== Critical reception ==
The Monthly Film Bulletin wrote: "A crisp, clear, unpretentious and oddly touching little film. It has all the right ingredients for a children's film – an exciting but not too implausible story, experienced and reliable adult players, a minimum of dialogue and, above all, a director with a narrative flair and a rare gift for evoking natural responses from child actors. There is a splendid suspense sequence at the climax, plenty of casual humour, and even a touch of visual poetry."

TV Guide noted "Definitely for the younger viewer."
