= Forstater =

Forstater is an English-language surname. As of 2014, it was held by 65 people in the United States and 5 people in England.

== Notable people ==
- Mark Forstater (b. 1943), British film producer
- Maya Forstater (b. 1973), daughter of Mark, British researcher and feminist.
