= Soapbox Derby (1957 film) =

1957 British film by Darcy Conyers

- Opening titles
- Directed by: Darcy Conyers
- Screenplay by: Darcy Conyers
- Story by: Robert Martin
- Produced by: Anthony Gilkison
- Starring: Michael Crawford; Keith Davis; Roy Townshend
- Cinematography: Douglas Ransom
- Edited by: John Reeve
- Production company: Children's Film Foundation/Bushey Studios
- Release date: 1957
- Running time: 65 minutes
- Country: United Kingdom
- Language: English

Soapbox Derby (also known as Soap Box Derby) is a 1957 British children's drama film directed by Darcy Conyers and starring Michael Crawford, Keith Davis and Roy Townshend. It was written by Conyers from a story by Robert Martin, and produced by the Children's Film Foundation.

== Plot ==
In South London, rival soapbox racing gangs the Battersea Bats and the Victoria Victors plan to enter the Soapbox Derby. Working for the Bats, Foureyes Fulton designs a high-performance "car", but the plans are stolen by the Victors' leader Lew Lender. Lender frames Foureyes, and the bats throw him out. He then joins the Victors and comes up with an even better design. Lew and his father steal the Bats' car and hide it, although the Bats recover it in time to enter and win the race.

== Cast ==
- Michael Crawford as Peter Toms
- Keith Davis as Legs Johnson
- Roy Townshend as Foureyes Fulton
- Alan Coleshill as Lew Lender
- Malcolm Kirby as John
- Raymond Dudley as Fred
- Carla Challoner as Betty Fulton
- Mark Daly as grandpa
- Denis Shaw as Mr Lender
- Jean Ireland as Mrs Fulton
- David Williams as Bill Hubbard
- Harry Fowler as barrow boy

== Reception ==
The Monthly Film Bulletin wrote: "The test of this film is, of course, the reaction of children's audiences; nevertheless it appears to an adult viewer as a polished melodrama with overtones of exceptionally funny slapstick provided by Denis Shaw, one of the few adult actors in the film. Most of the children have been directed to give very real, artless performances; Alan Coleshill is extraordinarily chilling as the boy villain of the piece. John Wooldridge's musical score is notably witty."

Kine Weekly wrote: "The direction is workmanlike and there is more than enough strenuous action to please even the most exacting juvenile. ... The acting of all the children is commendably natural, while the adult members of the cast, headed by that fine character actor the late Mark Daly as Grandpa and Denis Shaw as the unethical Mr. Lender, capture the spirit of the story admirably."

== Home media ==
In 2013 the film was released by the British Film Institute as part of its The Race is On DVD, together with Children's Film Foundation films The Sky Bike (1967) and Sammy's Super T-Shirt (1978).
