= Stephen Garlick =

British actor (born 1959)

- Born: 7 July 1959 (age 67); Stockwell, South London, England, UK
- Occupations: Actor, radio presenter
- Writing career
- Period: 1965–present

Stephen Garlick (born 7 July 1959) is a retired British actor best known as the voice of Jen in Jim Henson's The Dark Crystal.

His career has centered on film, television and radio. At the age of five he attended the famous Corona Academy stage school. As most children of his age he started doing a few television commercials. In 1965 he featured in a documentary called A Day of Peace, directed by noted film director Peter Collinson. Garlick had a non-speaking part as a small boy with a potty stuck on his head in Carry On Doctor (1967). He appeared in two films in the 1960s made by the Children's Film Foundation. He played the part of Dan in The Boy from Space, one of the Look and Read serials for BBC Schools. This was released on DVD by the British Film Institute.

== Career ==
As a child, Garlick appeared in the 1969 film Crossplot, starring Roger Moore. In 1973, Garlick played the role of Ned Lewis in the second series of The Adventures of Black Beauty. The series was released by Network DVD on a Bluray fiftieth anniversary release. He appeared on the special features disc alongside Judi Bowker with their memories of working on the programme. He also made another film for the Children's Film Foundation in 1975 called The Hostages. A year later he played an alien called Kwaan in the Thames Television sci-fi series The Tomorrow People. He played the part of Tim Moffat in the controversial six-part serial, Two People, for London Weekend Television. Other television appearances included ITV Playhouse and Butterflies.

One of his more notable television appearances was as John Standen, the son of a duplicitous business man Ted Standen (Gareth Hunt) in the Minder episode "The Son Also Rises" in which he appeared with fellow Corona boy Dennis Waterman.

Garlick played Ibbotson in the Doctor Who story Mawdryn Undead. Other TV appearances included Lovejoy and The Bill. He has provided many voices for radio and TV commercials and also films. His best-known voice role is the main character Jen in Jim Henson's 1982 American–British fantasy film The Dark Crystal. He has twice been a member of the BBC Radio Drama Company appearing in many radio plays. He played Detective Constable Tully in the radio crime series for the BBC called, Detective. He was a DJ for a short time, appearing as Steve Garlick on the recreation of the sixties offshore radio station, Radio London (Big L) between 2005 and 2008.

Garlick has started appearing at conventions, most notably a celebration of The Dark Crystal at Elstree Studios in 2020, where the film was made, and in Los Angeles to commemorate the film's fortieth anniversary in 2022. He now lives a house in Bedfordshire with his wife and daughter.

== Filmography ==
			Notes
1967	Jack and the Witch	Jack (voice)	English version
1967	Carry On Doctor	Boy	Uncredited
1968	Headline Hunters	Peter Hunter	
1969	Crossplot	Small Boy in Coach	
1970	Jackanory	Mick	4 episodes
1970	Scrooge	Child	
1974	The Adventures of Black Beauty	Ned	Recurring role
1976	The Tomorrow People	Kwaan	4 episodes
1977	The Brothers Lionheart	Jonatan (voice)	English version
1979	The Lion, the Witch and the Wardrobe	Peter (voice)	
1979	Two People	Tim Moffatt	
1980	The Boy from Space	Dan	
1982	The Dark Crystal	Jen (voice)	
1982	Minder	John Standen	Episode: "The Son Also Rises"
1983	Doctor Who	Ibbotson	Episode: Mawdryn Undead
1986	Lovejoy	Shop Assistant	Episode: "The Real Thing"
1987	The Storyteller	Young Grovelhog	Episode: Hans My Hedgehog
1989	The Bill	Shop Assistant	Episode: Tottering
1992	The Nicholas Craig Masterclass	Alan 2	Episode: Blow Winds and Crack Your Cheeks
