= Kenneth V. Jones =

British composer (1924–2020)

Kenneth Victor Jones FRCM (14 May 1924 – 2 December 2020) was a British composer of film scores and concert works, and a conductor.

== Life ==
Born in Bletchley, Buckinghamshire, Jones was a chorister at St Nicholas’s College of Church Music in Chislehurst under Sir Sydney Nicholson and later (with Nicholson's support) a scholar at King's School, Canterbury. This was followed by a six month RAF-sponsored course in music (with Hugh Allen) and philosophy at Queen's College, Oxford. During the war Jones spent four years as a navigator on Sunderland flying boats in Africa and the Far East.

After the war he enrolled at the Royal College of Music (1947–50), where his teachers included R. O. Morris, Bernard Stevens and Gordon Jacob. He became a professor at the RCM in 1958.

Jones was appointed as conductor to the London Metropolis Symphony Orchestra in 1957, and was the founder and original conductor of The Wimbledon Symphony Orchestra in 1961, where he stayed for ten years. He made his Royal Festival Hall conducting debut that year. He was also principal conductor at the Sinfonia of London (from 1966), the Hill Singers (1954–60), and the Reigate and Redhill Choral Society (1956–1964).

Jones married a teacher, Anne Marie Heine, in 1945 and there were two children, Frances (born 1949) and Anthony (born 1953). In 1966 he acted as one of the Governors of Rokeby School, helping to raise the £50,000 that was needed to save it from closure in 1966. In the late 1960s their address was 121, Church Road in Wimbledon. By the early 1970s the family had moved away from London and settled in Bishopstone, East Sussex. His wife died in 2009. He died in December 2020 at the age of 96, survived by his daughter and son.

== Music ==
Jones composed many film scores (mostly at Shepperton and Ealing studios and for British Transport Films). Among his best known scores are How to Murder a Rich Uncle (1957), Oscar Wilde (1961) and The Projected Man (1966). He also composed incidental music for television and theatre and many concert works, including four sonatas, 44 piano works and six song cycles. Lyrita released recordings of some of his chamber music for the first time in 2024.

== Selected filmography ==
- Sea Wife (1957)
- Fire Down Below (1957)
- How to Murder a Rich Uncle (1957)
- High Flight (1957)
- The Horse's Mouth (1958)
- No Time to Die (1958)
- The Bandit of Zhobe (1959)
- Ferry to Hong Kong (1959)
- The Siege of Pinchgut (1959)
- Jazz Boat (1960)
- Oscar Wilde (1960)
- The Girl on the Boat (1961)
- The Brain (1962)
- Cairo (1963)
- Psyche 59 (1964)
- The Tomb of Ligeia (1964)
- Maroc 7 (1967)
- The Projected Man (1966)
- Whoever Slew Auntie Roo? (1971)
- Tower of Evil (1972)
- Paganini Strikes Again (1973)
- Professor Popper's Problem (1974)
- Blind Man's Bluff (1977)
- The Brute (1977)
- Leopard in the Snow (1978)

== Concert works ==
- Hesperides, song cycle (Robert Herrick)
- Piano Sonata, Op.4 (1950)
- String Quartet No.1, Op.6 (1950)
- Wind Quintet No.2, Op.2 (1952)
- Concerto for string orchestra (1956)
- Concerto for oboe and strings (1963)
- The Pollock, orchestral prelude (1963)
- O Light Invisible, cantata for soloists, chorus and orchestra (1963)
- Sequences, chamber ensemble (1964)
- Concert Overture (rev. 1966)
- Quintet for piano and string quartet, Op.26 (1967)
- Violin Sonata (1967)
- Two Contrasts for solo cello (1971)
- Dialysis, for violin and harpsichord (1973)
- A Gay Psaltery, harpsichord (1975)
- Quaquaverse, for saxophone quartet (1979)
- Quinquifid for brass quintet (1980)
- Paean for organ (1983)
- Organ Sonata (1985)
- Three Sinfonias for orchestra
- Symphony
- Violin Concerto
- song cycles
- church music
