= John Bloom (film editor) =

English film editor (born 1935)

- Born: 12 September 1935 (age 91); London, England
- Occupation: Film editor
- Years active: 1958–2011
- Spouse: Sheila Johnston
- Relatives: Claire Bloom (sister); Anna Steiger (niece)

John Bloom (born 12 September 1935) is an English film editor with nearly fifty film credits commencing with the 1960 film, The Impersonator. He is the brother of actress Claire Bloom.

Bloom won the Academy Award for Best Film Editing and the American Cinema Editors (ACE) Award for Best Edited Feature Film for Gandhi (1982). He was nominated for Academy Awards in 1981 for his work on The French Lieutenant's Woman and in 1985 for A Chorus Line. He was nominated for the BAFTA Award for Best Editing in 1981 for The French Lieutenant's Woman, in 1982 for Gandhi, and in 1984 for Under Fire (with Mark Conte).

In 1999, the ACE awarded Bloom its Career Achievement Award.

In 2001, he won the Primetime Emmy Award for Outstanding Single Camera Picture Editing for a Miniseries, Movie or a Special for Wit, and, in 2004, the ACE Award for Best Edited Miniseries or Movie for Non-Commercial Television for his work on Angels in America (2003).

== Selected filmography ==
Editor
Year	Film	Director	Notes
1960	The Impersonator	Alfred Shaughnessy	
1961	Girl on Approval	Charles Frend	
1963	Man in the Middle	Guy Hamilton	First collaboration with Guy Hamilton
1964	Go Kart Go	Jan Darnley-Smith	First collaboration with Jan Darnley-Smith
1964	Eagle Rock	Henry Geddes	
1965	The Party's Over	Guy Hamilton	Second collaboration with Guy Hamilton
1965	Cup Fever	David Bracknell	
1965	Runaway Railway	Jan Darnley-Smith	Second collaboration with Jan Darnley-Smith
1966	Georgy Girl	Silvio Narizzano	
1966	Funeral in Berlin	Guy Hamilton	Third collaboration with Guy Hamilton
1967	The Last Safari	Henry Hathaway	
1968	The Lion in Winter	Anthony Harvey	First collaboration with Anthony Harvey
1969	In Search of Gregory	Peter Wood	
1971	The Last Valley	James Clavell	
1971	The Night Digger	Alastair Reid	Uncredited
1971	To Catch a Spy	Dick Clement	
1972	Henry VIII and His Six Wives	Waris Hussein	
1972	Travels with My Aunt	George Cukor	
1974	The Abdication	Anthony Harvey	Second collaboration with Anthony Harvey
1976	The Message	Moustapha Akkad	
1976	The Ritz	Richard Lester	
1977	Orca	Michael Anderson	
1978	Magic	Richard Attenborough	First collaboration with Richard Attenborough
1979	Dracula	John Badham	
1981	The French Lieutenant's Woman	Karel Reisz	Second collaboration with Karel Reisz
1982	Gandhi	Richard Attenborough	Second collaboration with Richard Attenborough
1983	Betrayal	David Jones	First collaboration with David Jones
1985	A Chorus Line	Richard Attenborough	Third collaboration with Richard Attenborough
1987	Black Widow	Bob Rafelson	
1988	Bright Lights, Big City	James Bridges	
1989	Jacknife	David Jones	Second collaboration with David Jones
1990	Everybody Wins	Karel Reisz	Third collaboration with Karel Reisz
1990	Air America	Roger Spottiswoode	Second collaboration with Roger Spottiswoode
1992	Prague	Ian Sellar	
1992	Damage	Louis Malle	
1994	Nobody's Fool	Robert Benton	
1996	Last Dance	Bruce Beresford	
1996	The First Wives Club	Hugh Wilson	
1999	The Deep End of the Ocean	Ulu Grosbard	
2000	Shaft	John Singleton	
2004	Closer	Mike Nichols	First collaboration with Mike Nichols
2006	Notes on a Scandal	Richard Eyre	
2007	Charlie Wilson's War	Mike Nichols	Second collaboration with Mike Nichols

Editorial department
Year	Film	Director	Role	Notes
1958	Heart of a Child	Clive Donner	Second assistant editor	Uncredited
1960	Bluebeard's Ten Honeymoons	W. Lee Wilder	First assistant editor	Uncredited
1978	Who'll Stop the Rain	Karel Reisz	Supervising editor	First collaboration with Karel Reisz
1983	Under Fire	Roger Spottiswoode	Supervising editor	First collaboration with Roger Spottiswoode

Sound department
Year	Film	Director	Role	Notes
1960	The Trials of Oscar Wilde	Ken Hughes	Assistant sound editor	Uncredited

Thanks
Year	Film	Director	Role
1996	Marvin's Room	Jerry Zaks	The producers wish to thank

Documentaries

Editor
Year	Film	Director
2011	King Kennedy	Ronan O'Rahilly

Shorts

Editor
Year	Film	Director
1962	Love Me, Love Me, Love Me	Richard Williams
1966	The Specialist	James Hill

TV movies

Editor
Year	Film	Director
1973	Divorce His, Divorce Hers	Waris Hussein
1973	The Glass Menagerie	Anthony Harvey
1984	Mistral's Daughter	Douglas Hickox; Kevin Connor
1993	A Foreign Field	Charles Sturridge
2001	Wit	Mike Nichols
2003	Angels in America	Mike Nichols
2009	Into the Storm	Thaddeus O'Sullivan

Editorial department
Year	Film	Director	Role
1981	Masada	Boris Sagal	Editorial consultant

TV series

Editor
Year	Title	Notes
1984	Mistral's Daughter	3 episodes
1993	Screen One	1 episode
2003	Angels in America	4 episodes

Editorial department
Year	Title	Role	Notes
1981	Masada	Editorial consultant	4 episodes
