= Margery Mason =

English actress (1913–2014)

- Born: Margery Eileen Mason; 27 September 1913; Hackney, London, England
- Died: 26 January 2014 (aged 100); Swiss Cottage, London, England
- Occupation: Actress
- Years active: 1927–2006
- Spouse: Peter Daminoff (m. 1951; div. 1956)

Margery Eileen Mason (27 September 1913 – 26 January 2014) was a British actress and director. She was the artistic director of The Repertory Theatre in Bangor, County Down, Northern Ireland in the 1960s.

== Career ==
Mason played Sarah Stevens, the mother in John Hopkins' four-play cycle Talking to a Stranger (1966). A family drama with four characters, the viewpoint of Sarah Stevens was depicted in the fourth play, The Innocent Must Suffer. Her film roles included Charlie Bubbles (1968), Clegg (1970), The Raging Moon (1971), Made (1972), Hennessy (1975), the bullying teacher's wife in Pink Floyd – The Wall (1982), Terry on the Fence (1986), a game show contestant in Victoria Wood Presents (1989), 101 Dalmatians (1996), Love Actually (2003), and the lady who works the sweets trolley in Harry Potter and the Goblet of Fire (2005). She played "The Ancient Booer" in the 1987 film The Princess Bride. Her television roles include appearances on Midsomer Murders,Touch of Frost Peak Practice and Juliet Bravo (1982) (Series 1, Ep. 8). She played Mrs Porter in the Granada TV series A Family at War during 1970–71.

== Personal life ==
Mason learned to scuba dive and received her diving certificate at the age of 81. Her farewell to the stage came in 2003 at the age of 90. She loved to travel and had been a keen horsewoman and tennis player. Until she was 99, she swam five times a week at the Swiss Cottage baths.

== Death ==
She died on 26 January 2014 peacefully from natural causes at her home in Swiss Cottage.

== Filmography ==
Year	Title	Role	Notes
1968	Charlie Bubbles	Mrs. Noseworthy	
1969	Walk a Crooked Path	Aunt Mildred	
1970	Clegg	Neighbour	
1970	A Family at War	Celia Porter	12 episodes from 1970–72
1971	The Raging Moon	Matron	
1972	Made	Mrs. Marshall	
1974	Village Hall	Mrs Digby	Series 1, Episode 7: Distant Islands
1975	Hennessy	Housekeeper	
1982	Pink Floyd – The Wall	Teacher's Wife	
1986	Terry on the Fence	Terry's Gran	
1987	The Princess Bride	The Ancient Booer	
1992	Howards End	Wedding Guest #2	
1993	The Hawk	Greengrocer	
1996	101 Dalmatians	Woman on Park Bench	
1998	Les Misérables	Nursing Nun	
1999	Jonathan Creek	Audrey Panguitch	Series 3 episode 2: The Eyes of Tiresias
2003	Love Actually	Harris Street Old Lady	
2005	Harry Potter and the Goblet of Fire	Food trolley lady	
