= Maroc 7 =

1967 British film by Gerry O'Hara

- Film poster by Renato Fratini
- Directed by: Gerry O'Hara
- Written by: David D. Osborn
- Produced by: John Gale; Leslie Phillips; Martin C. Schute
- Starring: Gene Barry; Elsa Martinelli; Leslie Phillips
- Cinematography: Kenneth Talbot
- Edited by: John Jympson
- Music by: Kenneth V. Jones
- Production company: Cyclone Films
- Distributed by: Rank Film Distributors
- Release date: 22 March 1967
- Running time: 91 minutes
- Country: United Kingdom
- Language: English
- Budget: £399,835
- Box office: £214,494

Maroc 7 is a 1967 British thriller film directed by Gerry O'Hara, starring Gene Barry, Cyd Charisse, Elsa Martinelli, Leslie Phillips and Denholm Elliott.

Filmink called the movie "one of several thrillers made by Rank that were co-productions partly shot in Europe using international 'names'."

== Plot ==
Louise Henderson is the editor of a respected fashion magazine, but she has a secret career as mastermind of a ring of thieves. With their professional operation as a front, Henderson uses one of her models, Claudia, and a photographer, Raymond Lowe, to steal precious artefacts and jewels. Law enforcement agencies have their suspicions about her, so undercover man Simon Grant is assigned the case. He pretends to be a safecracker to infiltrate Henderson's gang, travelling to Morocco, where Henderson intends to switch an imitation Arabian medallion for a priceless real one.

Grant is given cooperation in Morocco by Chief of Police Barrada. Things go wrong when Grant needs to kill Lowe, who has followed him. The theft takes place as planned, until Claudia dies while trying to take the medallion from Grant. To the surprise of cops and robbers alike, the precious medallion is stolen by the one person none of them suspected.

== Cast ==
- Gene Barry as Simon Grant
- Elsa Martinelli as Claudia
- Leslie Phillips as Raymond Lowe
- Cyd Charisse as Louise Henderson
- Denholm Elliott as Inspector Barrada
- Alexandra Stewart as Michelle Craig
- Angela Douglas as Freddie
- Eric Barker as Professor Bannen
- Tracy Reed as Vivienne
- Maggie London as Suzie
- Ann Norman as Alexa
- Penny Riley as Penny
- Lionel Blair as hotel receptionist
- Ricardo Montez as Pablo

== Production ==
In March 1966 Rank announced it would make nine films with a total cost of £7.5 million of which it would provide £4 million. Two films were financed by Rank completely: a Norman Wisdom movie and a "doctor" comedy (Doctor on Toast which became Doctor in Trouble). The others were The Quiller Memorandum, Deadlier than the Male, Maroc Seven, Red Hot Ferrari (never made), The Fifth Coin (never made), The Battle of Britain and The Long Duel. The film was the fifth in a series of movies jointly financed by Rank and the National Film Finance Corporation (NFFC).

It was produced by actor Leslie Phillips who worked 18 months setting up the movie and recalled "money was a little difficult towards the end, with the credit squeeze."

Phillips had seen The Pleasure Girls (1965) and hired its director Gerry O'Hara, who was under contract to Sydney Box. According to O'Hara, Gene Barry replaced a German actor who pulled out of the film. O'Hara said the film was "not a very happy experience... I went over budget. There were lots of problems."

The instrumental theme song, "Maroc 7", by The Shadows, was released as a single and rose to No. 24 on the UK singles chart in April 1967.

On the release of the film, a novelisation of the screenplay was published by John Burke, writing as "Martin Sands."

== Reception ==
Kine Weekly wrote: "After a slowish and over-mysterious start, the picture gets into a very entertaining stride and the double-twist ending is fun".

Monthly Film Bulletin wrote: "Despite an attractive cast and a fashionably post-Bond script, something seems to have gone sadly awry with this thriller."

The New Statesman described the film as "a feeble thriller, ... Denholm Elliott, the archetypal Old Etonian, is cast as a French-Moroccan cop. Gene Barry has the quizzical air of man who's just read the script."

Leslie Halliwell said: "Complex sub-Bond tale of cross and double-cross; hardly worth following really."

The Radio Times Guide to Films gave the film 2/5 stars, writing: "The heavily insured legs of Cyd Charisse are on display in this lacklustre crime caper. ... One of those misfires that makes you wonder why someone in the production line didn't cry out 'Stop, abandon ship'."
