= Gerry O'Hara =

British film and television director (1924–2023)

Gerald O'Hara (1 October 1924 – 9 January 2023) was a British film and television writer and director.

== Life and career ==
O'Hara was born in Boston, Lincolnshire on 1 October 1924, to James O'Hara, a bookmaker, and Jeannie O’Hara (née Beamont).

In the 1940s and 1950s he had an active and varied career as an assistant director for dozens of British films including Richard III (1955), Our Man in Havana (1959) and Tom Jones (1963).

His directorial debut was That Kind of Girl (1963). He later directed episodes of The Avengers, and the films Amsterdam Affair (1968) and The Brute (1977), the latter an exploration of domestic violence criticised for its exploitative elements. He also directed The Bitch (1979), for which he wrote the screenplay.

Later television credits include directing and writing episodes of The Professionals, script editor for the ITV series C.A.T.S. Eyes and directing an episode of the children's comedy drama Press Gang.

In 2011 he published a Sherlock Holmes pastiche novel, Sherlock Holmes and The Affair in Transylvania.

O'Hara died on 9 January 2023, at the age of 98. He was survived by his third wife, Penny.

== Filmography (as director) ==
- That Kind of Girl (1963)
- Game for Three Losers (1965)
- The Pleasure Girls (1965)
- Maroc 7 (1967)
- Amsterdam Affair (1968)
- All the Right Noises (1971)
- The Chairman's Wife (short, 1971)
- Journey to Murder (1971)
- The Spy's Wife (short, 1972)
- Paganini Strikes Again (1973)
- Professor Popper's Problem (1974)
- Feelings a.k.a. Whose Child Am I? (1975)
- Blind Man's Bluff (1977)
- The Brute (1977)
- Leopard in the Snow (1978)
- The Sea Can Kill (documentary short, 1978)
- The Bitch (1979)
- Fanny Hill (1983)
- The Mummy Lives (1993)

== Television (as director) ==
- The Edgar Wallace Mystery Theatre, "Game for Three Losers" (1965)
- The Avengers, "The Hour That Never Was" (1965), "Small Game for Big Hunters (1966)"
- Man in a Suitcase, "The Sitting Pigeon" (1967)
- Journey to the Unknown, "Do Me a Favor and Kill Me" (1968)
- The Professionals, "A Hiding to Nothing" (1979)
- Press Gang, "Picking Up the Pieces" (1990)
