= Graham Kibble-White =

British writer

Graham Kibble-White is a British writer known for his writing on television and popular culture. The Liverpool Daily Post described him as a "cult TV guru".

He is a founder of the television nostalgia websites Off the Telly and TV Cream. In 2006 he was appointed TV editor for Inside Soap, a British weekly on soap operas. Kibble-White is the author of The Ultimate Book of British Comics (2005), which provides details on more than 100 comics in an A-Z format. He also writes for Doctor Who Magazine. He has written on television for the Daily Mirror's We Love Telly! magazine.

== Books ==
- 20 Years of Brookside (2002; with Phil Redmond)
- The Ultimate Book of British Comics (2005)
- TV Cream: The Ultimate Guide to 70s and 80s Pop Culture (2005)
- Look-in: The Best of the Eighties (2008)
