= Kay Mander =

English documentary film director

- Plaque at the birthplace of Kay Mander
- Born: Kathleen Molyneux Mander; 28 September 1915; Kingston upon Hull, East Riding of Yorkshire, England
- Died: 29 December 2013 (aged 98); Castle Douglas, Dumfries and Galloway, Kirkcudbrightshire, Scotland
- Other name: Kathleen Molyneux Neilson-Baxter
- Education: Queenwood Ladies' College
- Occupations: Film director; continuity supervisor
- Years active: 1940 – 2001
- Works: Kay Mander filmography
- Spouse: Rowan Kennedy Neilson-Baxter (m. 1940; died 1978)

Kathleen Molyneux Neilson-Baxter (née Mander; 1915 – 2013), known professionally as Kay Mander, was a British documentary film director and continuity supervisor.

== Early life and education ==
Kay Mander was born Kathleen Molyneux Mander on 28 September 1915 in Kingston upon Hull, to Mable Fanny Mander (née Jacob; 1881–1958) and Thomas Hope Mander (1882–1952), an accountant and bookkeeper.

Due to Thomas's work the Mander family moved to Paris in 1922. Mander remained in France for seven years, and attended French language school. In 1929, the Mander family returned to England where she attended Queenwood Ladies' College. In 1931, the Mander family moved to Berlin, living there until 1935.

After failing to secure a scholarship to Oxford University in 1935, Mander initially considered a career in teaching, journalism or acting.

== Career ==
In 1935, Mander secured a job as a secretary at Joseph Goebbels's International Film Congress in Berlin. There she met several delegates of the British feature film industry who encouraged her to look for employment in the British film industry. She contacted them for a job when she returned to Britain. Her first job in the film industry was as an interpreter for German cameraman Hans Schneeberger. Schneeberger was in London working on the aviation docudrama Conquest of the Air (1936) for producer Alexander Korda, of London Films. She then spent several years working in traditionally "female" departments such as publicity, budget and production before moving into continuity.

In 1940, she was offered a job at Shell Film Unit making instructional films by producer Arthur Elton. Her debut film as a director was How to File (1941), intended as a training tool for the aircraft construction industry. Mander was praised for her innovative use of tracking shots following the movement of the file. Mander directed four more instructional films for Shell Film Unit, two for the recently restructured Fire Service and another for the Ministry of Home Security. These films were highly complex and technical and made for specialised audiences but were characterised by clarity, simplicity and skilful technical exposition.

Mander went on to direct up to fifty instructional and promotional films in the UK and overseas. One of her best known films is Homes for the People (1945) which used the technique of allowing working class women to describe their living conditions, one of them vividly slating the design of her suburban house and summing up: "I call it a muck-up".

In the 1950s, Mander and her husband, fellow filmmaker Rowan Kennedy Neilson-Baxter, returned from Indonesia where they had helped set up a film unit. After directing a feature film for the Children's Film Foundation, The Kid from Canada (1957), Mander returned to continuity work, later saying that "I palpably had the skills" but could not face "battling" to continue directing.

She spent most of the rest of her career working in continuity on feature films, including From Russia with Love, The Heroes of Telemark and Fahrenheit 451.

== Politics ==
During the 1930s, Mander joined the Communist Party of Great Britain (CPGB) and attended Left Book Club meetings. Her political leanings would later influence her filmmaking. In 1937, she was the first woman to join the film industry's union, the Association of Cinematographic Technicians (ACT) (now BECTU). She had a column in the ACT journal, The Cine-Technician, until the 1950s, where she wrote union issues such as the need for equal pay and post-war job security. After the end of World War II, her membership of the CPGB made it more difficult for her to find work.

== Personal life ==
In October 1940, Mander married the director and producer Rowan Kennedy Neilson-Baxter (known professionally as R.K. Neilson-Baxter). During her marriage Mander had an affair with the actor Kirk Douglas.

Following her husband's death in 1978, Mander moved to Dumfries. Mander remained in Scotland for the rest of her life, spending the latter half of her life in Castle Douglas.

On 29 December 2013, Mander died aged 98 in Castle Douglas. Mander is commemorated with a green plaque on 194 Marlborough Avenue.

== Selected filmography ==
=== As Director ===
Year	Title	Role	Notes	Ref(s)
1941	How to File	Director	Directorial debut	
1942	Mobilising Procedure	Director		
1943	Highland Doctor: A Film of the Highlands & Islands Medical Service	Director and story		
1944	New Builders	Director		
1945	Homes for the People	Director		
1948	La Famille Martin	Director and Editor		
1949	Cine Panorama	Director	Part of the Local Studies series for the Ministry of Information Visual Unit	
1949	Near Home	Director and writer		
1949	Histoire De Poissons	Director and Editor		
1950	Depart De Grandes Vacances	Director and Editor		
1951	Clearing the Lines	Director	Short, Part of the Changing Face of Europe documentary series	
1953	Mardi and Monkey	Director	Short, for the Children's Film Foundation	
1957	The Kid From Canada	Director	For the Children's Film Foundation	

=== As continuity supervisor ===
Year	Title	Role	Notes	Ref(s)
1957	Danger List	Continuity supervisor	Short	
1960	Oscar Wilde	Continuity supervisor		
1963	From Russia with Love	Continuity supervisor		
1963	The List of Adrian Messenger	Continuity supervisor		
1965	The Heroes of Telemark	Continuity supervisor		
1966	Fahrenheit 451	Continuity supervisor	Uncredited	
1967	Danger Route	Continuity supervisor		
1972	Henry VIII and His Six Wives	Continuity supervisor		
1985	Plenty	Continuity supervisor		
1987	Straight to Hell	Continuity supervisor		
1995	I Was Catherine the Great's Stable Boy	Continuity supervisor	Short	
