= Blind Man's Bluff (1977 film) =

1977 British film by Gerry O'Hara

- Directed by: Gerry O'Hara
- Screenplay by: Patricia Latham
- Produced by: Cyril Randell
- Starring: Patricia Fletcher; Terry Sue Patt; Steve Fletcher
- Cinematography: Alfie Hicks
- Edited by: Archie Ludski
- Music by: Kenneth V. Jones
- Production company: Willis World Wide Productions
- Release date: 1977
- Running time: 57 minutes
- Country: United Kingdom
- Language: English

Blind Man's Bluff is a 1977 British children's film directed by Gerry O'Hara and starring Patricia Fletcher, Terry Sue Patt and Steve Fletcher. It was written by Patricia Latham and produced by Willis World Wide for the Children's Film Foundation.

== Plot ==
London shopkeeper Mr. Hunter has won money on the football pools. While he is out celebrating, his son Joe is abducted by shop assistant Chrissie and her boyfriend Jack. Joe's friends Steve and Maisie go in search of him, accompanied by their blind friend Smithy and his new guide dog. They suspect that Chrissie may be involved, since other than Mr Hunter's family, only she knew of his win. In a shed owned by Jack's uncle Fred, they find one of Joe's shoes. When Steve hears Jack making a threatening telephone phone call to Mr. Hunter, Smithy immobilises Jack's car. They find Joe, and Maisie brings the river police who arrest Jack, Chrissie and Fred.

== Cast ==
- Patricia Fletcher as Maisie
- Terry Sue Patt as Steve
- Steve Fletcher as Joe
- Christopher Ellison as Smithy
- Debbie Ash as Chrissie
- David Lincoln as Jack
- Reg Lye as Uncle Fred
- Kenneth Watson as Mr Hunter
- Mela White as Mrs Hunter
- Richard Parmentier as Mr Oliver

== Reception ==
The Monthly Film Bulletin wrote: "The examples of public-spirited behaviour invariably endorsed by the Children's Film Foundation seem sometimes strangely at odds with the implicitly disregarded dangers often found in some of the Foundation's high adventure movies. The fact that the kidnappers in this energetic yarn are so patently inept seems sufficient cause for the makers to have passed up the chance for a sensible and, one would have thought, timely warning about the perils of going-it-alone in just such a case. There is no suggestion that the lightly-clad Joe's subterranean ordeal may have been anything but mildly trying; in view of this, the paternal Mr. Oliver contents himself with a commendation to Steve and Maisie for fulfilling their community-service project: thanks to them, Smithy has proved he can handle his dog and is thus able to take a coveted new job."
