= Cup Fever =

1965 British film by David Bracknell

- Opening titles
- Directed by: David Bracknell
- Screenplay by: David Bracknell
- Story by: David Bracknell
- Produced by: Roy Simpson
- Starring: Bernard Cribbins; David Lodge; Sonia Graham
- Cinematography: John Coquillon
- Edited by: John Bloom
- Music by: Bill McGuffie
- Production company: Century Film Productions
- Distributed by: Children's Film Foundation (UK)
- Release date: July 1965 (UK)
- Running time: 63 minutes
- Country: United Kingdom
- Language: English

Cup Fever is a 1965 British family sports film directed and written by David Bracknell and starring Bernard Cribbins and David Lodge. It was produced for the Children's Film Foundation. The film includes early appearances from Susan George and Olivia Hussey.

== Plot ==
A youth football team are ejected from their playing field on a waste ground, and struggle to find another place to train for a cup semi-final. Thanks to a friendly policeman, they spend a day training with professionals at Manchester United, including George Best, Bobby Charlton and Denis Law. Despite sabotage from the opposing team, they go on to win the final and are presented with their cup by Manchester City goalkeeper Bert Trautmann.

== Cast ==
- Bernard Cribbins as policeman
- Sonia Graham as Mrs. Davis
- Dermot Kelly as Bodger the cobbler
- David Lodge as Mr. Bates
- Johnnie Wade as milkman
- Norman Rossington as driver
- Rex Boyd as himself
- Ruth Holden as herself
- Bud Ralston as himself
- Rex Deering as himself
- Matt Busby as himself
- Denis Law as himself
- Bobby Charlton as himself
- Nobby Stiles as himself
- David Herd as himself
- Pat Dunne as himself
- Jack Crompton as himself
- George Best as himself
- John Connelly as himself
- Paddy Crerand as himself
- Tony Dunne as himself
- Bill Foulkes as himself
- Shay Brennan as himself
- Bert Trautmann as himself
- Susan George as Vicky Davis
- Olivia Hussey as Jinny

== Reception ==
The Monthly Film Bulletin wrote: "Filmed on location in Manchester, this is a genial, lively and quite inventively scripted comedy, put over with considerable verve. Among the highlights are Bernard Cribbins as the policeman ineffectually trying to catch up with the youngsters in their latest back-street pitch; the rescue activities of numerous milkmen in their mobile milk floats; the Cup match sequence which forms the climax; and – what juvenile audiences may well remember with most pleasure – the training session with Denis Law and other famous players. David Lodge is appropriately dastardly as the town councillor, and the young players are a spirited lot."

== Accolades ==
The film won the 1970 ABC Cinemas "Chiffy" award, voted for by children, for Top Feature Film from the Children's Film Foundation.
