= TV Cream =

British television nostalgia website

Website logo in 1998-2002; again used at closing time (2024)

TV Cream was a British television nostalgia website, which had expanded to cover not only television, but film, toys, books, and other objects. The Daily Telegraph called it "a labour of love" and praised "the standard of the writing". In 2003, it was amongst the nominees for Yahoo! UK & Ireland as best comedy website. Its sister website Off The Telly offered more serious insight into television. Off The Telly ceased producing new content in 2010, but its archive remained available, latterly hosted within TV Cream, until 2024.

== History ==
The site originally appeared as The Arkhive on 31 August 1997, before adopting its current name the following year. Founded by Phil Norman, the site mainly reviews hundreds of programmes shown on British television (but not necessarily made in the UK), during the 1970s and 1980s, though some earlier and later shows are also featured. The site also features a selection of nostalgia-based articles relating to areas of popular culture such as pop music, film, comics, and so on.

Site writers included Steve Berry, Chris Diamond, Chris Hughes, Ian Jones, Graham and Jack Kibble-White, Suzy Norman, Jill Phythian, Matthew Rudd, Ian Tomkinson, Simon Tyers, Steve Williams and TJ (Tim) Worthington. Some contributors were also involved with "Off the Telly", worked in journalism and/or wrote books. Graham Kibble-White wrote for the Daily Mirror and Jill Phythian appeared as a talking-head on TV list shows.

TV Cream also operated email lists; as at 2024 these were Creamguide, which provides subscribers with a weekly mailout listing forthcoming TV programmes of interest, and Why Don't YouTube?, a weekly Substack mailing compiling clips of archive TV material from that week in history, sourced via YouTube. The latter mailing grew from a feature which had run in text form in some editions of the defunct Creamup (TV Cream Update), a monthly digest of features (distributed via a Yahoo! Group) which had largely ceased regular publication by the end of the 00s; a final Creamup, composed of new and reused material, was distributed via the Creamguide mailing list on the day TV Cream's closure was announced.

On 31 August 2024, the website announced its shutdown on 19 September, due to increasingly infrequent edits in recent years and increased server costs. Creamguide and Why Don't YouTube? mailings continue.

== Publications ==
The website and its contributors have produced a number of spin-off books, some marketed as TV Cream tie-ins, others individual projects by writers:

=== Official TV Cream books ===
TV Cream: The Ultimate Guide To 70's and 80's Pop Culture (aka TV Cream: Nostalgia Book of the 70's And 80's) (ISBN 0-7535-1080-4) was published by Virgin Books in June 2005.

TV Cream's Anatomy of Cinema (ISBN 190554846X) was published by The Friday Project Ltd. in April 2007. The Independent praised it for telling the truth about the often ropey quality of British cinema.

TV Cream Toys by Steve Berry (ISBN 1-905548-27-3) was published by The Friday Project Ltd. in November 2007. The book rates toys according to their "status, lifespan, usability, 'eBayability' and overall play satisfaction".

The Great British Tuck Shop (formerly The TV Cream Tuck Shop) by Steve Berry and Phil Norman (ISBN 1906321450) was published by The Friday Project in October 2012.

=== Related books by contributors ===
Closet Reading by Phil Norman (Gibson Square) was a history of the spin-off books produced to accompany British television comedy series, such as The Brand New Monty Python Bok and The Goodies File, volumes which were often used as toilet reading. The Guardian called it "a wittily written curio, and to hardcore comedy fans, it's a definitive reference work".

Morning Glory: A History of British Breakfast Television by Ian Jones and Graham Kibble-White. A serious history of breakfast television by 2 regular TV Cream contributors, based on material originally published on the Off The Telly website.

Fun At One! The Story of Comedy at Radio 1, a history of BBC Radio 1's comedy output, by contributor Tim "TJ" Worthington.
