= The Sky Bike =

1967 British children's film by Charles Frend

The Sky-Bike
- Opening titles
- Directed by: Charles Frend
- Screenplay by: Charles Frend
- Story by: Charles Frend
- Produced by: Harold Orton
- Cinematography: John Coquillon
- Edited by: Richard Mason
- Music by: Harry Robinson
- Production company: Eyeline Films
- Distributed by: Children's Film Foundation
- Release date: December 1967 (UK)
- Running time: 62 min
- Country: United Kingdom
- Language: English

The Sky-Bike is a 1967 colour British children's film written and directed by Charles Frend (his last feature as director). It was produced by Harold Orton for the Children's Film Foundation. A novel based on the script was later published.

== Plot ==
Tom Smith, living in English suburbia, is an only child who dreams of flying. He spends a lot of time at an abandoned airfield and there he meets a man who has invented a flying bicycle, but it will not stay in the air. They decide to adapt it for two cyclists, to give greater power. Their aim is to win £5000 in a competition for the first man-powered flight. They have a rival team, also based at the airfield, and both are troubled by the security guard and his two Alsatians. Tom is aided by his friend Porker and his sister Daphne.

== Cast ==
- Liam Redmond as Mr. Lovejoy (Graves for business)
- William Lucas as Mr. Smith
- Ellen McIntosh as Mrs. Smith
- Spencer Shires as Tom Smith
- Ian Ellis as Bill (Porker)
- Della Rands as Daphne
- John Howard as Jack
- Bill Shine as Wingco
- David Lodge as airfield guard
- Guy Standeven as Squadron Leader
- Andrew Venn as Bert
- Harold Bennett as old man (Drophead Charlie)
- Harry Locke as cycle shop owner

The film was notable as the first foray of David Charlton into acting.

== Critical reception ==
The Monthly Film Bulletin wrote: "An agreeable and often imaginative children's film, a little weak on plot but making up for it with the splendid central idea of a competition for man-powered flying machines. The Sky Bike itself is a charming flight of fantasy, and it is to the credit of the producers that on what must have been a very low budget they have managed to get the machines into the air for quite long periods. Mechanically minded youngsters should find the whole thing very intriguing."

TV Guide called it an "Imaginative children's adventure film ... not always believable, but this flaw can easily be overlooked given the high energy of the production."
