= Frederick Treves (actor) =

English actor (1925–2012)

Frederick Treves BEM
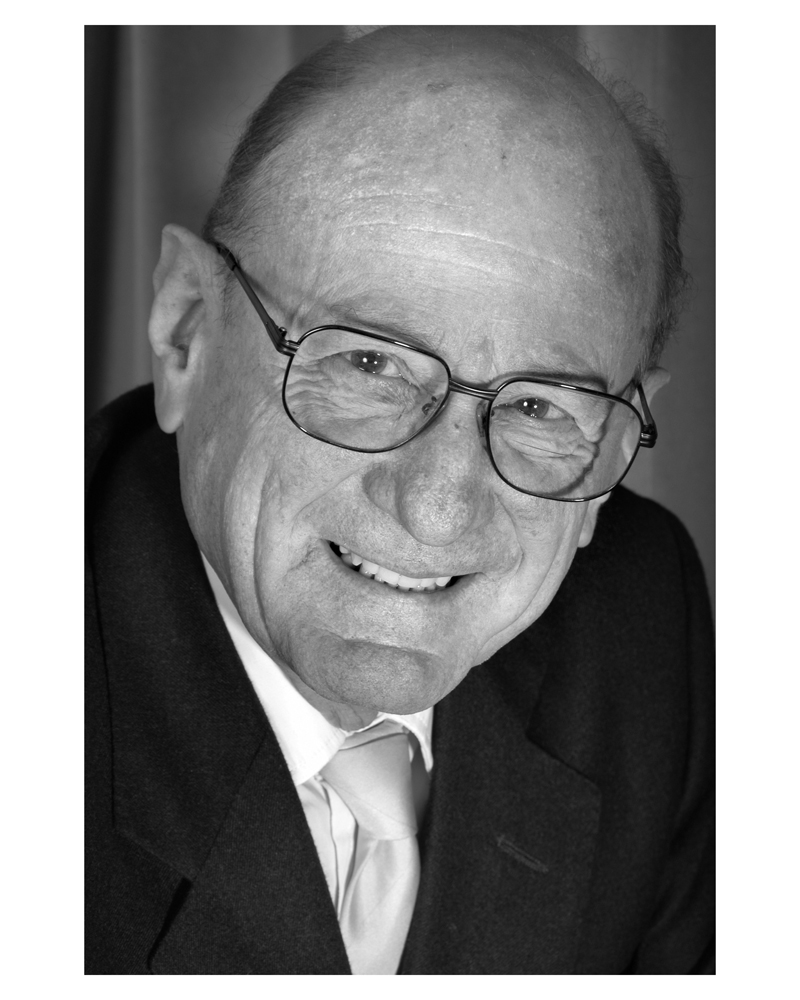
- Treves in 2005
- Born: Frederick William Treves; 29 March 1925; Cliftonville, Margate, Kent, England
- Died: 30 January 2012 (aged 86); Mitcham, London, England
- Occupation: Actor
- Spouse: Jean Stott (m. 1956)
- Children: 3, including Simon
- Relatives: Sir Frederick Treves (grand-uncle)

Frederick William Treves (29 March 1925 – 30 January 2012) was an English actor with an extensive repertoire, specialising in avuncular, military, and titled types.

== Early life ==
Treves attended the Nautical College, Pangbourne and in World War II he served in the Merchant Navy. On his first voyage his ship, the refrigerated cargo liner Waimarama, was part of the Operation Pedestal convoy to Malta. On 13 August 1942 Waimarama was bombed by a German Junkers Ju 88 aircraft. The ship's deck cargo included containers of aviation spirit that burst into flame. Waimarama exploded and 83 of her 107 crew were killed.

Cadet Treves, then seventeen years old, helped save several of his shipmates, and was consequently awarded the British Empire Medal and Lloyd's War Medal for Bravery at Sea.

After the war Treves trained at the Royal Academy of Dramatic Art.

== Career ==
Treves had over a hundred television credits, including roles in A For Andromeda, The Cazalets, The Jewel in the Crown, Strangers and Brothers, A Dance to the Music of Time, The Politician's Wife, To Play the King, Lipstick on Your Collar, Summer's Lease, Bomber Harris, Trevor Griffiths' version of The Cherry Orchard, David Edgar's Destiny, The Naked Civil Servant, Mr. Bean, Drop The Dead Donkey, The Railway Children and Strange Experiences.

Treves also guested in many continuing dramas, such as All Creatures Great and Small, Rosemary & Thyme, Monarch of the Glen, The Bill, The New Adventures of Black Beauty, Silent Witness, Kavanagh QC, Jeeves and Wooster, Inspector Morse, Agatha Christie's Poirot, Lovejoy, Rumpole of the Bailey , Yes, Prime Minister, Bergerac, Midsomer Murders, Heartbeat, Follyfoot, Crown Court, Miss Marple, Minder, Z-Cars, The Avengers, Doomwatch and in the Doctor Who story Meglos.

Treves' films included Freelance (1971), One Hour to Zero (1976), Sweeney 2 (1978), Charlie Muffin (1979), The Elephant Man (1980), Nighthawks (1981), Defence of the Realm (1985), Paper Mask (1990), The Fool (1990), Afraid of the Dark (1991), Mad Dogs and Englishmen (1995) and Sunshine (1999).

As well as screen appearances, Treves also had a wide stage and radio career, and appeared with the National Theatre from the late-1970s in David Hare's Plenty, Bernard Shaw's The Philanderer, Arnold Wesker's Caritas, Eugene O'Neill's The Iceman Cometh, and two Shakespeares – Leonato in Much Ado About Nothing (1981) and Menenius in Coriolanus (1984).

== Personal life ==
Treves was from a medical family; his father was a physician and his great uncle was Frederick Treves, the surgeon who became famous for discovering Joseph Merrick, the "Elephant Man". In the David Lynch film The Elephant Man, the surgeon is played by Anthony Hopkins and Treves himself appeared in the character of Alderman.

Treves married Jean Stott in 1956. The marriage produced three children, a daughter and two sons. His elder son is the actor Simon Treves.

== Filmography ==
| Year | Title | Role | Notes |
|---|---|---|---|
| 1953 | Wheel of Fate | | |
| 1956 | Jumping for Joy | Attendant | Uncredited |
| 1956 | The Long Arm | Detective Tailing Creasey | Uncredited |
| 1956 | High Terrace | Police Constable West | |
| 1957 | The Mark of the Hawk | 2nd Officer | |
| 1960 | Carry On Constable | Radio Announcer | Voice, Uncredited |
| 1971 | Freelance | Car Driver | |
| 1976 | One Hour to Zero | Superintendent Parry | |
| 1976 | Devices and Desires | Reverend Granville Moulton | |
| 1978 | Sweeney 2 | McKyle | |
| 1978 | On a Paving Stone Mounted | | |
| 1979 | Charlie Muffin | Wilcox | |
| 1980 | The Elephant Man | Alderman | |
| 1981 | Nighthawks | Police Chief Inspector – London | |
| 1983 | A Flame to the Phoenix | | |
| 1986 | Defence of the Realm | Arnold Reece | |
| 1986 | The Natural World – The Man Eaters of Kumaon | Jim Corbett | |
| 1990 | Paper Mask | Dr. Mumford | |
| 1990 | The Fool | Samuel Simpson | |
| 1991 | Afraid of the Dark | Eye Surgeon | |
| 1993 | Closing Numbers | Anna's Father | |
| 1995 | Mad Dogs and Englishmen | Sir Harry Dyer | |
| 1995 | Mr. Bean | Colonel | Episode: "Hair by Mr. Bean of London" |
| 1999 | Sunshine | Emperor | |
