= Go Kart Go =

1963 British film by Jan Darnley-Smith

- Directed by: Jan Darnley-Smith
- Screenplay by: Michael Barnes
- Story by: Frank Wells
- Produced by: George H. Brown
- Starring: Dennis Waterman; Pearl Catlin; Jimmy Capehorn
- Cinematography: John Coquillon
- Edited by: John Bloom
- Music by: Ron Goodwin
- Production company: Fanfare Films
- Release date: 1963
- Running time: 55 minutes
- Country: United Kingdom
- Language: English

Go Kart Go is a 1963 British black and white children's comedy-drama film directed by Jan Darnley-Smith and starring Dennis Waterman, Pearl Catlin and Jimmy Capehorn. It was written by Michael Barnes from a story by Frank Wells, and produced for the Children's Film Foundation.

== Plot ==
Two rival children's go-kart gangs compete to win the local race. The Damson Street gang only has a home-made motorised soap-box, but the Craven gang has a proper go-kart, and therefore win all the races. The Damsons try to build a more powerful kart using a lawn mower engine, but when it runs out of control they persuade their parents to pay for a professional kart kit, in time for the big race. The Craven gang try to sabotage the Damsons' new kart, but fail. The Damons finally triumph.

== Cast ==
- Dennis Waterman as Jimpy
- Pearl Catlin as Jimpy's Mum [uncredited]
- Jimmy Capehorn as Square Head
- Frazer Hines as Harry Haggetty
- Pauline Challoner as Patchy
- Melanie Garland as Squirt
- Robert Ferguson as Stiggy
- John Moulder-Brown as Spuggy
- Edward Martin as Slab
- Hugh Halliday as Basher
- Gareth Robinson as Cheesy
- Christopher Witty as Woodlouse
- Graham Stark as policeman
- Campbell Singer as policeman
- Wilfrid Brambell as Fred, junk man
- Cardew Robinson as postman
- Gladys Henson as housewife
- Peter Myers as race organiser
- Alan White as parent
- Harry Locke as greengrocer parent

== Reception ==
The Monthly Film Bulletin wrote: "Ealing-inspired kids' adventure with a dash of Tashlin. The novice director, Jan Darnley-Smith, brings economy and polish to the stock story. He knows how to cater for and get the best out of children – both gangs are toughly, realistically observed – and has an engaging taste for near-fantasy. A chase sequence through Harrow, with a runaway lawn-mower peeling and chipping Gladys Henson's spuds and hacking a bald path through a rug laid out to be cleaned, is worthy of a Jerry Lewis film. Ron Goodwin's score is lively; the cutting and camerawork are slick, especially in the all-important racing scenes; and various adult guest stars – Graham Stark as a Quiet Wedding policeman, Wilfrid Brambell as a Steptoe junk-dealer – catch the infectious enthusiasm of their spirited young colleagues. An altogether admirable CFF production."

Alistair McGown wrote for the British Film Institute: "This film is a good example of the 'gang' in the CFF films – as well as engendering a sense of camaraderie, the ensemble of mixed ages of kids, boys and girls, allows most members of the CFF audience (aged between 5 and 12) to find a point of identification, even if this probably seems a mite unrealistic. For obvious reasons the eldest members of the gangs carry the film – and were among Britain's most experienced child actors of the 1950s and would soon become adult TV stars. Go Kart Go also serves as a good example of the way CFF films preferred actions to words, using relatively little dialogue. The well-edited, noisy race setpieces symbolise rather than verbalise simple conflict. TV comedy fans should note the cameo appearances by Wilfrid Brambell as scrap dealer Old Fred – just a year after the debut of Steptoe and Son (BBC, 1962–1974). Brambell appears heralded by a piece of incidental music that pastiches Ron Grainer's famous 'Old Ned' theme."

Writing in The Guardian, Andrew Roberts called Go Kart Go an "archetypal 1960s CFF film."

== Accolades ==
The film was awarded the Arquero de Bronce at the 1964 Children's Film Festival, Gijon, Spain.

== Home media ==
Go Kart Go was released on the compilation DVD Saturday Morning Pictures: Volume 3 (Network, 2007).
