= Mark Forstater =

American film producer

- Born: Mark Irwin Forstater; 1943 (age 82–83); Philadelphia, U.S.
- Occupation: Film producer
- Notable work: Monty Python and the Holy Grail
- Children: 4, including Maya

Mark Irwin Forstater (born 1943) is an American film and TV producer, author, audio producer, music producer and tech entrepreneur, notable for producing the film Monty Python and the Holy Grail. In 2012, he sued the five living members of Monty Python over a dispute regarding royalties from merchandising income, including the Spamalot musical, which was "lovingly ripped off from" the Holy Grail movie. He is a graduate of London Film School.

== Childhood and education ==
Forstater was born in Philadelphia and is Jewish. He was educated in Philadelphia public schools and graduated in the 216 class of Central High School. He attended and graduated from Temple University, also in Philadelphia. He moved to England in 1964 to read English Literature at the University of Manchester as a visiting student.

== Career ==
Forstater worked as an assistant editor on ITV Anglia's Survival. He produced his first feature film - The Great Wall of China, directed by Joel Tuber. Forstater also made two short films for the BFI Production Board. In 1971 he started Chippenham Films with Julian Doyle.

At City College of New York Film School, Forstater was a classmate and flatmate of Terry Gilliam. In 1969, he reunited with Gilliam in London, where Gilliam introduced him to Michael Palin and Terry Jones. After the commercial failure of And Now for Something Completely Different, the Pythons decided to make an original film and asked Forstater to produce. That project became Monty Python and the Holy Grail. Forstater later wrote about the film’s production and the subsequent Spamalot royalties legal dispute in his book The 7th Python.

Forstater has made over 30 films including The Grass Is Singing, from the novel by Doris Lessing, made in Zambia and directed by Michael Raeburn, and Marigolds in August, by Athol Fugard, directed by Ross Devenish.

In 1981, Forstater produced the cult classic Xtro directed by Harry Bromley Davenport. Other notable productions include: The Wolves of Willoughby Chase, from the book by Joan Aiken, directed by Stuard Orme; the Cannes official selection Between the Devil and the Deep Blue Sea, directed by Marion Hänsel; Forbidden, directed by Anthony Page; The Cold Room, directed by James Dearden; The Fantasist, written and directed by Robin Hardy; and The Glitterball, directed by Harley Cokliss.

Forstater also produced a drama series Grushko for BBC1.

In 1999, Forstater produced his first audio – the Tao Te Ching, with Nigel Hawthorne reading the text. This led to Forstater writing and producing a series of four books and audiobooks on spirituality and philosophy – The Spiritual Teachings of Marcus Aurelius, The Spiritual Teachings of the Tao, The Spiritual Teachings of Yoga, and The Spiritual Teachings of Seneca. Forstater has written three further books: The Living Wisdom of Socrates, I Survived a Secret Nazi Extermination Camp, and the autobiographical The 7th Python.

In 2018, Forstater started a new company with video producer and composer Nathan Neuman. Forstater produced film Swipe Fever.

== Legal battles ==
On 4 July 2013, he won the High Court of Justice case against the surviving members of Monty Python over royalty payments to Spamalot as a derivative work of Monty Python and the Holy Grail. They owed £1.3 million in past royalties and legal fees, which prompted them to produce Monty Python Live (Mostly) in 2014 to pay their debt.

== Personal life ==
Forstater lives in London. He has been married twice and has four daughters, including Maya Forstater, and three grandsons.

Forstater has said that the protracted Spamalot royalties case was greatly detrimental to his well-being both financially and mentally.

== Films produced ==
- Killing Heat
- Monty Python and the Holy Grail
- Marigolds in August
- The Glitterball
- The Fantasist
- Xtro

== Books ==
- The Seventh Python – A Twat's Tale
- I Survived a Secret Nazi Extermination Camp (2013). Forstater was inspired to write this unique memoir 'a retelling of his own stateside family history, [...] a meditation for the extended family he never knew' who died in the Belzec extermination camp after he read the memoirs of Rudolf Reder, 'one of two known Jewish survivors of [...] Belzec', where 600,000 Jews and Roma were killed. Reder's memoir is included in Forstater's book. Several of Forstater's relatives were murdered in the Belzec camp.
- The Spiritual Teachings of Marcus Aurelius (Harper, 2000)
- The Age of Anxiety: A Guided Meditation for the Financially Stressed
