= Calamity the Cow =

1967 film directed by David Eastman

- Opening titles
- Directed by: David Eastman
- Produced by: Ian Dalrymple
- Starring: John Moulder-Brown; Elizabeth Dear; Stephen Brown
- Cinematography: Bert Mason
- Edited by: Jack Drake
- Production company: Children's Film Foundation
- Release date: 1967
- Running time: 55 minutes
- Country: United Kingdom
- Language: English

Calamity the Cow is a 1967 British film directed by David Eastman and starring John Moulder-Brown and Elizabeth Dear. It was written by Eastman and Kerry Eastman and made for the Children's Film Foundation. The film featured Phil Collins as a teenage actor three years prior to his joining Genesis.

== Plot summary ==
Farmer Grant's children get him to buy a cow from another farmer. The children work hard to make the cow fit and healthy enough for the show ring. But at the last minute the other farmer, Kincaid, steals Calamity.

== Cast ==
- John Moulder-Brown as Rob Grant
- Elizabeth Dear as Jo Grant
- Stephen Brown as Tim Lucas
- Phil Collins as Mike Lucas
- Josephine Gillick as Beth Lucas
- Grant Taylor as Mr. Grant
- Honor Shepherd as Mrs. Grant
- Alastair Hunter as Kincaid
- Michael Warren as Ringer
- Desmond Carrington as Uncle Jim
- Ken Goodlet as Lefty
- Peter Halliday as Sergeant Watkins

== Reception ==
The Monthly Film Bulletin wrote: "Against a background of village and farm-life, this children's film is filled out largely in terms of slapstick. The nicest touch is the Heath Robinson contraption which the children build from material they find in a junk-heap – an old bath and bits of a bedstead – to transport the cow to the show. The slapstick ranges from flying paint from a can on a revolving horn gramophone to the predictable but vigorous action of Calamity biffing the villainous Kincaid into a water trough. Fields and country lanes provide pleasant settings for an agreeable piece of children's entertainment."
