= Terry on the Fence =

1985 British children's film by Frank Godwin

- Opening titles
- Directed by: Frank Godwin
- Starring: Jack McNicholl; Neville Watson; Tracey Ann-Morris; Jeff Ward
- Production company: Children's Film and Television Foundation
- Release date: 1985
- Running time: 70 min
- Country: United Kingdom
- Language: English
- Budget: £180,747

Terry on the Fence is a 1985 British children's drama film directed by Frank Godwin and starring Jack McNicholl, Neville Watson, Tracey Ann-Morris, and Susan Jameson. It was produced by the Children's Film and Television Foundation.

It cost £180,747.

== Plot ==
A young tearaway becomes involved with a gang of criminals.

== Cast ==
- Jack McNicholl as Terry
- Neville Watson as Les
- Tracey Ann-Morris as Tracey
- Jeff Ward as Mick
- Matthew Barker as Denis
- Brian Coyle as Plastic-Head
- Susan Jameson as Terry's Mum
- Martin Fisk as Terry's Dad
- Margery Mason as Terry's Gran
- Helen Keating as Mrs. Hicks
- Jon Croft as headmaster
- Clifford Rose as Magistrate
- Ann Morrish as lady Magistrate
- Julian Curry as Clerk of the Court
- Tim Preece as schoolmaster
- Janet Davies as usher

== Reception ==
The Monthly Film Bulletin wrote: "Made on a slender budget of £185,000, under the auspices of the Children's Film and Television Foundation, Frank Godwin's adaptation of Bernard Ashley's novel was intended to 'get away from the black and white of goodies and baddies'. With the virtual collapse of the Saturday-morning matinee audience, the CFF saw the need to aim their features at a wider film and television audience, comprised of both children and adults. In Terry on the Fence, this proves to be a distinct advantage, allowing the strong, clear narrative to delve into greyer areas of moral ambiguity. This centres on Terry and Les, victim and victimiser, and the bond which develops between them out of something more than fear. In its attention to social detail, though, the film tends to lapse into a schematic and stereotypical portrayal of the boys' home environments. The Harmers are nice lower-middle-class people who reward the errant Terry with a stiff word or two, and a hot bath. Les' mum, on the other hand, is a brassy, bingo-playing blonde who whacks him about the head for getting a little mud on the carpet. Similarly, the disparity between the punishments meted out to Les and Terry tends to suggest that the criminal episode was only a temporary aberration, and that nice middle-class boys don't get into trouble unless forced into it by undesirable working-class lads."
