= The Glitterball =

1977 British film by Harley Cokliss

- Title Card
- Directed by: Harley Cokliss
- Written by: Michael Abrams, Howard Thompson, Harley Cokliss
- Produced by: Mark Forstater
- Starring: Ben Buckton; Keith Jayne; Ronald Pember; Marjorie Yates; Barry Jackson
- Cinematography: Alan Hall
- Edited by: Thomas Schwalm; Nick Gaster
- Music by: Harry Robinson; Malcolm Clarke
- Production companies: Children's Film Foundation; Mark Forstater Productions Ltd.
- Release date: 1977 (UK)
- Running time: 55 minutes
- Country: United Kingdom
- Language: English

The Glitterball is a 1977 British sci-fi children's film made by Mark Forstater Productions for the Children's Film Foundation. It was directed by Harley Cokeliss, credited under his birth name of Harley Cokliss. The film was screened at the 2010 Edinburgh Film Festival as part of a retrospective of 16 "rarely seen" British films made between 1967 and 1979, "rediscovered" after a year of detective work by event staff. In 1979, Methuen Publishing released the children's novel by the same name, written by screenwriters Howard Thompson and Harley Cokliss. ISBN 9780416863406.

== Plot ==
Two boys befriend a stranded alien in the shape of a little silver ball and help it to return home.

== Cast ==
- Ben Buckton as Max Fielding
- Keith Jayne as Pete
- Ron Pember as George "Filthy" Potter
- Marjorie Yates as Mrs. Fielding
- Barry Jackson as Sergeant Fielding
- Andrew Bradford as corporal
- Derek Deadman as ice cream man
- Leslie Schofield as radar operator
- Linda Robson as checkout operator

== Awards and nominations ==
1982, nominated for Fantasporto 'International Fantasy Film Award' for 'Best film' for Harley Cokeliss.
