= Sammy's Super T-Shirt =

1978 British film by Jeremy Summers

- Opening titles
- Directed by: Jeremy Summers
- Written by: Frank Godwin; H. MacLeod Robertson
- Produced by: Frank Godwin
- Starring: Reggie Winch; Lawrie Mark; David Young; Keith Jayne; Richard Vernon; Julian Holloway; Patsy Rowlands
- Music by: Harry Robinson
- Distributed by: Children's Film Foundation
- Release date: 1978
- Running time: 58 minutes
- Country: United Kingdom
- Language: English

Sammy's Super T-Shirt is a 1978 British children's comedy film directed by Jeremy Summers and starring Reggie Winch and Lawrie Mark. It was made for the Children's Film Foundation.

== Synopsis ==
Pint-size Sammy Smith's greatest ambition is to become a sporting superstar. With the aid of his West Indian friend Marvin and the famous Professor Hercules's body-building course, Sammy is training for the long distance running championship. Two bullies, Sammy's rivals in the race, throw his 'lucky' Tiger T-shirt through the window of a research laboratory. In trying to get it back, Sammy upsets some electrical apparatus and in the resultant explosion the T-shirt is transformed into a source of tremendous power.

The chief scientist, Mr. Trotter, and his boss, Mr. Becket, decide to exploit this discovery for their own ends, but Sammy and Marvin escape with the shirt, which enables Sammy to jump over the high factory wall, to stop the crooks car with one hand, and to run down the road like a rocket. After a number of narrow escapes, Sammy gets to the sports ground, but is tripped at the start of the race by the two bullies. With the aid of the super T-shirt, he succeeds in forging ahead, but as Marvin arrives at the ground, Sammy falters and is brought to a halt by the now volatile T-shirt. Marvin rips off the shirt and persuades Sammy to run under his own steam. Sammy eventually catches up and wins the race.

== Music ==
The theme song, Sammy's Super T-Shirt was written by Harry Robinson and Frank Godwin. Robinson also wrote the original story from which the screenplay was adapted, and thus was credited as H. MacLeod Robertson.

== Reception ==
The Monthly Film Bulletin wrote: "The bionic gimmick provides the basis for this lively and cheerful children's movie. The groundwork of the plot is rather shakily laid – the boys' ease of access to the lab certainly strains credulity – but once the T-shirt acquires its magic properties, the narrative hits its stride and incorporates some pleasing asides (told by his mother to cut the bread, 'super' Sammy haplessly slices through the board along with the loaf) while building to a smartly mounted chase finale. Richard Vernon and Julian Holloway – the latter spouting chunks of pseudo-scientific gobbledegook – are a well-matched double act as the mock villains, and there is a neat cameo by Jack May as an officious sportsmaster who reacts without a flicker of surprise or interest to Sammy's novel excuse – he was being held by kidnappers – for lateness."
