= The Boy Who Turned Yellow =

1972 film by Michael Powell

- video cover
- Directed by: Michael Powell
- Written by: Emeric Pressburger
- Produced by: Emeric Pressburger
- Starring: Mark Dightam; Robert Eddison; Helen Weir; Brian Worth
- Cinematography: Christopher Challis
- Edited by: Peter Boita
- Music by: Patrick Gowers; David Vorhaus
- Production companies: Roger Cherrill Ltd, Children's Film Foundation
- Distributed by: Rank
- Release date: 16 September 1972 (UK)
- Running time: 55 minutes
- Country: United Kingdom
- Language: English
- Budget: slightly over £40,000

The Boy Who Turned Yellow (1972) is the last film collaboration by the British filmmakers Michael Powell and Emeric Pressburger, and the last theatrical feature to be written by Emeric Pressburger or directed by Michael Powell. The film was made for the Children's Film Foundation.

== Plot ==
John loses one of his pet mice, Alice, while on a school trip to the Tower of London. Upset back in class, he is sent home by his teacher for not paying attention during a lesson on electricity. Later that day on the London Underground, the train and everyone in it suddenly turns bright, vivid yellow. John's doctor declares that the condition is harmless and should wear off soon, but that evening John hears noises from his television set and meets the eccentric yellow-coloured Nick (short for Electronic). The pair return to the Tower of London in an attempt to find Alice, but they are menaced by Yeoman Warders and John is threatened with execution. When John is finally reunited with his pet, he awakes in class. Was his adventure actually all just a dream?

== Cast ==
- Mark Dightam as John Saunders
- Robert Eddison as Nick
- Helen Weir as Mrs. Saunders
- Brian Worth as Mr. Saunders
- Esmond Knight as Doctor Ward
- Laurence Carter as Schoolteacher
- Patrick McAlinney as Supreme Beefeater
- Lem Dobbs as Munro
- Nigel Rathbone as Schoolboy
- Peter Schofield as Beefeater

== Production ==
The film was the last collaboration by Michael Powell and Emeric Pressburger, and the last feature film either were involved with. (Powell was involved with the 1978 short Return to the Edge of the World.) Powell and Pressburger also brought in some of their old colleagues from the days of The Archers, such as cinematographer Christopher Challis and actor Esmond Knight.

Location shooting took place at sites around London:

- Tower of London, Whitechapel
- Holborn tube station, Aldwych branch platform (as Chalk Farm tube station and Hampstead stations)
- Hampstead tube station, Hampstead (exterior only)
- Christchurch Hill, Hampstead
- Hampstead Heath, Hampstead
- Willow Road, Hampstead

== Awards ==
The film won a "Chiffy" award from the Children's Film Foundation. The "Chiffy" award was voted for by CFF audiences.
