= One Hour to Zero =

1976 British film by Jeremy Summers

- Open titles
- Directed by: Jeremy Summers
- Written by: John Tully
- Produced by: Jean Wadlow
- Cinematography: Norman Jones
- Edited by: Monica Mead
- Music by: Anthony Isaac
- Distributed by: Charles Barker Films
- Release date: 1976
- Running time: 55 min.
- Country: United Kingdom
- Language: English

One Hour To Zero is a 1976 British film directed by Jeremy Summers and starring Andrew Ashby, Jayne Collins and Toby Brige. It was written by John Tully and produced by Charles Barker Films for the Children's Film Foundation.

== Plot ==
In the fictional Welsh village of Llynfawr, Steve runs away from home after an argument with his father. His sister Maureen enlists the help of his friend Paul to find him, although Paul is initially unwilling to help. He eventually finds Steve in an abandoned slate quarry. On their return they find the village deserted and are unaware that the village has been evacuated due to the danger of an incident at a nearby power station. They are unable to contact the outside world as the village's only public telephone was earlier vandalised by Steve in an attempt to get money from it. While searching the village they stumble across Mike Ellis robbing the local cash and carry and Paul is locked in the quarry while Mike makes his escape. Steve tries and fails to set him free but Paul's father arrives. While the two children are lost, Steve's father returns to his place of work – the power station – in an attempt to correct the cooling fault, and prevent the disaster. He eventually succeeds with seconds to spare, and is reunited with his son.

== Cast ==
- Jayne Collins as Maureen Rogers
- Toby Bridge as Paul Jenkins
- Andrew Ashby as Steve Rogers
- Dudley Sutton as Mike Ellis
- John Forgeham as Sam Rogers
- John Barcroft as Peter Jenkins
- Ann Windsor as Hilda Jenkins
- Mike Lewin as PC Edwards
- Morris Perry as Professor Stonely
- Frederick Treves as Superintendent Parry
- Hazel McBride as Jean
- Roger Llewellyn as PC Morgan

== Production ==
Most of the film was shot on location in North Wales, the nuclear research station featured was actually Trawsfynydd nuclear power station in Gwynedd. The term "nuclear" does not appear in the dialogue at all, although Paul does refer to the "experimental reactor".

== Reception ==
The Monthly Film Bulletin wrote: "Passing up the chance to treat a topical subject as anything more than a predictable domestic drama, One Hour to Zero uses the threat of an exploding nuclear power station strictly as background material. The station, represented as a lurid pasteboard control room, would have been more at home in an old-fashioned strip-cartoon; and the major emergency is depicted as a rural incident worthy of a few police road blocks, a single helicopter and a vague professor with two assistants puzzling over why the experiment went wrong. Rather than dealing, however tangentially, with the implications of a nuclear disaster, the movie has the self-satisfied Paul give the vaguely delinquent Steve (complete with archaic short-backand-sides haircut) a stiff dose of CFF advice about the selfishness of his running away and causing everyone so much trouble."
