= Paganini Strikes Again =

1973 British film by Gerry O'Hara

- Directed by: Gerry O'Hara
- Screenplay by: Michael Barnes
- Produced by: Cyril Randell
- Starring: Julie Dawn Cole; Dudley Sutton; Philip Bliss; Andrew Bowen
- Cinematography: Alfred Hick
- Edited by: Roy Deverell
- Music by: Kenneth V. Jones
- Production company: Interfilm
- Release date: 1973
- Running time: 59 minutes
- Country: United Kingdom
- Language: English

Paganini Strikes Again is a 1973 British children's film directed by Gerry O'Hara and starring Julie Dawn Cole, Dudley Sutton, Philip Bliss and Andrew Bowen. It was written by Michael Barnes based on the 1972 book of the same title by Benjamin Lee. It was produced by Interfilm for the Children's Film Foundation.

== Plot ==
Bill and Mike are schoolboy musicians. They hear gunfire and see a man running off, wearing yellow boots. Learning from the police that a nearby jeweller's shop has been robbed, they set off to catch the thief. When they discover that their school's window cleaner, Mr Raddings, also wears yellow boots, they follow him to a container depot where he meets his accomplices, and hide inside a container. They are rescued and the criminals are caught by the police.

== Cast ==
- Julie Dawn Cole as Nicola
- Dudley Sutton as Raddings
- Patrick Jordan as Jones
- Philip Bliss as Bill
- Andrew Bowen as Mike
- Simon Thompson as Pitmore
- John Arnatt as Inspector Mainwaring
- Damaris Hayman as Miss Lanyard
- Jean Marlow as Mrs Pitmore
- Desmond John as Mr Greatly
- James Beckett as 1st crook
- Alfie Maron as 2nd crook

== Reception ==
The Monthly Film Bulletin wrote: "A chase on foot seems to be as de rigueur for children's films these days as the car chase in the adult variety, but the one in Paganini Strikes Again is a rather dull affair, taking its momentum from a speeded-up sequence on the escalators of the Elephant and Castle Shopping Centre. The rest of the film has no need of such gimmicks, for it has an economical and intelligent script ... which exactly catches the casual, jokey relationship of the bright young adolescent detectives, admirably played by Andrew Bowen and Philip Bliss. The boys' interest in music gives plenty of scope for both aural and visual gags – the Inspector's joking entreaty to "Give us a tune" whenever he sees Bill and Mike is finally answered when the boys draw the police to the container in which they are incarcerated by breaking open a box of instruments and playing them all at once. Fittingly, there is an excellent score by Kenneth V. Jones."

The Chicago Tribune described the film as "excellent quality."
