= Frank Godwin (film producer) =

English film producer (1917–2012)

Frank Godwin (23 June 1917 – 6 September 2012) was an English film producer, best known for the film Woman in a Dressing Gown.

Born to a theatrical family, Godwin initially worked as an accountant and joined Gainsborough Studios in 1943.

In 1956, Godwin established a film production company with film director J. Lee Thompson and writer Ted Willis. They made two films for Associated British Picture Corporation: the award-winning Woman in a Dressing Gown (1957) and No Trees in the Street (1959).

Godwin was a producer for films such as Don't Bother to Knock (1961) and Demons of the Mind (1972). His final film was Terry on the Fence (1985) which he also wrote and directed.
