= Children's Film Foundation =

Non-profit UK organisation which made films for children

- Children's Media Foundation
- Formation: 1951; 75 years ago
- Type: Film and television production
- Headquarters: London, England
- Director: Greg Childs OBE
- Board Chair: Anna Home OBE
- Key people: Russell T Davies; Philip Pullman; Floella Benjamin; David Puttnam
- Website: www.thechildrensmediafoundation.org
- Formerly called: Children’s Film and Television Foundation

The Children's Film Foundation (CFF) is a non-profit organisation which made films and other media for children in the United Kingdom. Originally it made films to be shown as part of children's Saturday morning matinée cinema programming. The films typically were about 55 minutes long. Over time, the organisation's role has broadened and its name changed, first to the Children's Film and Television Foundation (CFTF) in 1982, and later to the Children's Media Foundation (CMF) in 2011. It continues as an advisory body, campaigning to develop TV and film production for children.

== History ==
The Children's Film Foundation was formed in 1951 following the Wheare report that criticised the suitability of American programming for Saturday morning pictures. Mary Field was appointed chief executive.

The Foundation was initially funded by the Eady Levy (a voluntary tax on box office receipts), receiving 5% of the Levy with an initial budget of £60,000 per year. The Foundation made around six films a year, with most lasting less than an hour and shot in less than two weeks. Filming was mainly carried out during the school holidays, with the child cast supported by adult performers including Ronnie Barker, David Lodge, Patricia Hayes and Sydney Tafler, who were paid minimum rates set by Equity.

From 1953, the Foundation released each film to a different cinema circuit which was able to show the film for a year before passing it to the next circuit. With the film distributed through the four main circuits (Associated British, Gaumont, Odeon Cinemas and independents), the film would be on release for five years before being removed from release for a year and then re-released again. Following changes to the circuits and distribution patterns, in 1963, Gaumont and Odeon were grouped under the Rank circuit and the independent circuit was divided in two to retain four distribution groups.

In 1955, 1,915 cinemas in the UK screened children's matinées, of which 1,400 showed films produced by the Children's Film Foundation. As the CFF was a not-for-profit organisation, ticket prices remained at a sixpence (2½p) until 1971.

Frank Richard Wells (1903–82), second son of H. G. Wells and Amy Catherine Robbins, was a main executive at the CFF.

Some of the films were critically recognised, winning awards at the Cannes Film Festival, Moscow Film Festival and Venice Film Festival. The films were also popular on TV in the United States, and at 16mm showings in public libraries in Germany, Japan, Canada and South Africa.

By 1979, attendances for Saturday morning matinées were dwindling and the Foundation's annual funding was reduced from £530,000 a year to £330,000. The Eady Levy was abolished in 1985 and the Foundation made a few further films in the mid-1980s, by which time it had been renamed the Children's Film and Television Foundation (CFTF) in 1982. It ceased operations in 1987 and its final production was Just Ask for Diamond (1988).

Many of its films, dating back to the 1960s, continued to be shown on the BBC during the 1980s, in the Friday Film Special strand.

In 2011, the CFTF changed its name to become the Children's Media Foundation (CMF), and has since lobbied producers at the BBC on funding issues for children's TV. In 2023, the CMF sent a briefing document to politicians including the Culture Secretary Lucy Frazer urging that streaming services offer “quality children’s content” from the UK. The Foundation has called for Netflix and YouTube to pay a levy of their profits to create a £100m fund for children’s programming.

Anna Home OBE currently serves as Board Chair of the CMF. In July 2026, Helen McAleer was appointed Editorial Director of the Children’s Media Conference (CMC).

== Legacy ==
The CFF's films include early performances from prominent British actors including Phil Collins, Susan George, Michael Crawford, Carol White, Richard O'Sullivan and David Hemmings.

Film titles also include early work from several notable directors, such as Don Sharp, James Hill, Don Chaffey, John Guillermin, and Kay Mander. It also recruited more established directors; most notably, Michael Powell and Emeric Pressburger, with The Boy Who Turned Yellow (1972), the last film they produced as partners.

In June 2012, the British Film Institute (BFI) acquired the worldwide rights to the CFF collection, which is now preserved at the BFI National Archive.

Noel Brown later wrote of the foundation: “unlike Hollywood co-productions, which are forced to reflect international norms in pursuing a global audience, its films unambiguously reflected and recapitulated British norms and values.”

Robert Shail described the CFF as having "a deeply held conviction that childhood was a formative stage of development that was open to external influence, which films could positively impact to help shape future citizens for the better."

== Selected filmography ==
- Bush Christmas (1947)
- The Stolen Plans (1953)
- The Dog and the Diamonds (1953)
- Soapbox Derby (1958)
- The Cat Gang (1958)
- The Salvage Gang (1958)
- The Adventures of Hal 5 (1958)
- Hunted in Holland (1960)
- The Last Rhino (1961)
- Go Kart Go (1963)
- Runaway Railway (1965)
- Cup Fever (1965)
- Calamity the Cow (1967)
- Countdown to Danger (1967)
- River Rivals (1967)
- Cry Wolf (1968)
- Mr. Horatio Knibbles (1971)
- The Boy Who Turned Yellow (1972)
- Mauro the Gypsy (1972)
- Hide and Seek (1972)
- Paganini Strikes Again (1973)
- Professor Popper's Problem (1974)
- Robin Hood Junior (1975)
- The Firefighters (1975)
- The Man from Nowhere (1975):with Sarah Hollis Andrews and Ronald Adam
- One Hour to Zero (1976)
- Fern the Red Deer (1976)
- The Battle of Billy's Pond (1976)
- Blind Man's Bluff (1977)
- The Glitterball (1977)
- A Hitch in Time (1978)
- Sammy's Super T-Shirt (1978)
- 4-D Special Agent (1981)
- Tightrope to Terror (1982)
- Friend or Foe (1982)
- Gabrielle and the Doodleman (1984)
- Haunters of The Deep (1984)
- Terry on the Fence (1985)
- Out of Darkness (1985)
- Just Ask For Diamond (1988)

== Sources ==
- Rank Film Library 16mm Catalogue, 1978, (pp183–193)
