= Mary Cathcart Borer filmography =

This article is a list of films and television shows written or adapted by Mary Cathcart Borer.

== Films ==
Year	Title	Role	Type	Notes	Ref(s)
1940	Old Mother Riley in Society	Screenwriter	Fiction	Co-written with Austin Melford and Barbara Emary. Original story by Kitty McShane	
1944	Surgery in Chest Disease	Scenario	Non-fiction	G.B. Instructional and the British Council	
1944	Accident Service	Scenario	Non-fiction	G.B. Instructional and the British Council	
1944	Tom's Ride	Story	Fiction	G.B. Instructional	
1945	Sports Day	Screenwriter	Fiction	G.B. Instructional. Co-written with Francis Searle	
1946	Two Thousand Years Ago	Screenwriter	Non Fiction	G.B. Instructional and the Religious Films Society. 5 part serial.	
1946	Tales of the Woodland	Screenwriter	Fiction	6 part serial. Original story by Enid Blyton	
1947	Castle Sinister	Screenwriter	Fiction	Adapted from the play Mark of Judas by Vance Youden.	
1947	Circus Boy	Screenwriter	Fiction	Children’s Entertainment Films (CEF). Co-written with Cecil Musk. Original story by Patita Nicholson	
1947	The Little Ballerina	Original story	Fiction	CEF. Co-written with Lewis Gilbert. Screenplay by Michael Barringer	
1947	Fortune Lane	Screenwriter	Fiction	CEF. Original story by Gunby Hadath. Co-written with Geoffrey Orme	
1947	Squirrel War	Screenwriter	Fiction	CEF. 3 part serial. Original story by Helen Williams	
1948	The Last Load	Screenwriter	Fiction	CEF. Co-written with Geoffrey Orme	
1948	Under the Frozen Falls	Adaptation	Fiction	CEF. Original story by J.H. Martin Cross	
1949	The Dragon of Pendragon Castle	Screenwriter	Fiction	CEF. Based on the idea by Janet M. Smith	
1949	Trapped by the Terror	Screenwriter	Fiction	CEF. Co-written with Sherard Powell. Based on the story by Ion Grundy	
1949	Three Bags Full	Screenwriter	Fiction	Co-written with Sybil Clarke and Geoffrey Orme	
1949	Mr. Marionette	Screenwriter	Fiction	CEF	
1950	The Mystery of the Snakeskin Belt	Screenwriter	Fiction	CEF. Story by Lewis Jackson.	
1950	"Sussex Fortnight"	Screenwriter	Non-fiction	Credited as Egan Storm. Co-written with Norman Hemsley.	
1951	Trek to Mashomba	Screenwriter	Fiction	CEF	
1953	The Dog and the Diamonds	Original story	Fiction	Children's Film Foundation (CFF). Screenplay by Patricia Latham.	
1954	Mystery on Bird Island	Original story	Fiction	CFF. Screenplay by John Haggarty. Screen story by Mary Dunn	
1955	Tim Driscoll's Donkey	Original story	Fiction	CFF. Script by Patricia Latham and Terry Bishop.	
1956	One Wish Too Many	Adaptation	Fiction	CFF. Script by John Eldridge. Original story by Norah Pulling.	
1957	Treasure at the Mill	Adaptation and screenwriter	Fiction	CFF. Original story by Malcolm Saville	
1957	Second Fiddle	Original story	Non-fiction	Co-written with Arnold Ridley. Screenplay by Robert Dunbar and Allan MacKinnon	
1958	Blow Your Own Trumpet	Screenwriter	Fiction	CFF	
1958	The Salvage Gang	Original story	Fiction	CFF. Screenplay by John Krish	
1961	The Missing Note	Screenwriter	Fiction	CFF	
1961	The Monster of Highgate Ponds	Screenwriter	Fiction	CFF	
1962	Masters of Venus	Adaptation	Fiction	CFF. Screenplay by Michael Barnes. Original story by H.B. Gregory.	
1963	The Rescue Squad	Adaptation	Fiction	CFF. Screenplay by Anne Barrett. Original story by David Scott Daniell	
1963	Treasure in Malta	Adaptation	Fiction	CFF. Screenplay by Malcolm Stewart. Original story by Frank Wells.	
1965	Eagle Rock	Original story	Fiction	CFF. Screenplay by Henry Geddes	

== Television ==
Year	Title	Role	Type	Notes	Ref(s)
1950	The Reluctant Dragon	Adaptation	Fiction	Original story by Kenneth Grahame.	
1955	Hand in Glove	Screenwriter	Fiction	TV movie	
1959	Four Feather Falls	Screenwriter	Fiction	How It Began (Pilot)	
1960	Four Feather Falls	Screenwriter	Fiction	Kidnapped	
1961	The Fifth Form at St. Dominic's	Adaptation	Fiction	4 part BBC children's serial. Co-adapted with C. E. Webber	
1961	The Secret of the Nubian Tomb	Screenwriter	Fiction	The Unexpected Visitors	
