= The Fifth Form at St. Dominic's (film) =

1921 British film by A. E. Coleby

- Directed by: A. E. Coleby
- Written by: David Aylott; A. E. Coleby; Talbot Baines Reed (novel)
- Production company: I. B. Davidson
- Distributed by: Granger
- Release date: September 1921
- Country: United Kingdom
- Languages: Silent; English intertitles

The Fifth Form at St. Dominic's is a 1921 British silent drama film directed by A. E. Coleby. It is based on the 1881 novel The Fifth Form at St. Dominic's by Talbot Baines Reed.

== Cast ==
- Sam Austin as Ben Cripps
- Clifford Cobbe as Mr. Rastle
- Percy Field as Horace Wrayford
- Ralph Forbes as Oliver Greenfield
- William Freshman as Loman
- Douglas Phair as Tony Pembury
- Milton Royce as Mr. Jellicot
- Phyllis Shannaw as Nancy Senior
- Cecil Susands as Bullinger
- Maurice Thompson as Stephen Greenfield
- Humberston Wright as Dr. Senior

== Bibliography ==
- Low, Rachael. History of the British Film, 1918-1929. George Allen & Unwin, 1971.
