= Second Fiddle (1957 film) =

- DVD cover
- Directed by: Maurice Elvey
- Written by: Robert Dunbar; Allan MacKinnon
- Based on: story by Mary Cathcart Borer; Arnold Ridley
- Produced by: Robert Dunbar
- Starring: Adrienne Corri; Thorley Walters; Lisa Gastoni
- Cinematography: Arthur Graham
- Edited by: Ted Hunter
- Music by: William Davies
- Production company: Act Films Ltd
- Distributed by: British Lion Films (UK)
- Release date: June 1957
- Running time: 78 minutes
- Country: United Kingdom
- Language: English

Second Fiddle is a 1957 British comedy film directed by Maurice Elvey and starring Adrienne Corri, Thorley Walters, Lisa Gastoni and Richard Wattis. It was written by Robert Dunbar and Allan MacKinnon based on a story by Mary Cathcart Borer and Arnold Ridley, and produced by Dunbar for Act Films Ltd. It was Elvey's final film.

The title comes from the phrase "to play second fiddle" in allusion to an orchestra, meaning to be ignored in relation to some other more important party whilst putting in as much effort.

== Plot ==
Deborah and Charles are an engaged couple, and both are young executives at the successful Pontifex Advertising Agency in London. Deborah writes very successful jingles for television commercials, whilst Charles creates advertisements for print publications. However, the Pontifex board of directors will onlay allow the employment of single women on their staff, so Deborah worries about her future with the company if they get married, although Charles believes a successful man should be able to support a stay-at-home housewife.

Just before they get married, Deborah is asked to compose a series of jingles in a very short time and then take them to the company's New York office to run an advertising campaign there. This results in her spending most of her time at the office and seeing very little of Charles. Meanwhile, a promotion which Charles was hoping for goes to someone else. After their wedding, Deborah has to immediately fly to New York, and while she is away Charles is flattered by the attentions of his attractive secretary Pauline and spends time with her outside work. At the same time, he is annoyed that Deborah seems to be writing to everyone else in the office but he has had only two postcards, despite her promise to write letters.

Eventually, a campaign by the staff to change the company's policy on the employment of married women leads to a long debate by the board of directors which is dominated by the owner of the company, Lord Pontifex. Eventually, alarmed at the prospect of losing Deborah, he agrees to the change, and the staff have a party to celebrate.

On returning from their delayed honeymoon, Charles and Deborah arrive at their apartment and find an important letter that she had sent from New York but which Charles hadn't collected, and they also find many gifts from their clients, with more than one of many of them. Deborah announces that she is pregnant.

== Cast ==
- Adrienne Corri as Deborah
- Thorley Walters as Charles
- Lisa Gastoni as Pauline
- Richard Wattis as Bill Turner
- Bill Fraser as Nixon
- Aud Johansen as Greta
- Brian Nissen as Jack Carter
- Ryck Rydon as Chuck
- Jill Melford as Dolly
- Joy Webster as Joan
- Dino Galvani as Dino
- Johnny Briggs as Jimmy
- Launce Maraschal as Pontifex
- Frederick Piper as Potter
- Beckett Bould as General
- Madoline Thomas as Emily Pfennig ("Fenny")
- Ian Whittaker as delivery boy
- Christina Lubicz as waitress in the Tahiti coffee bar

== Critical reception ==
The Monthly Film Bulletin wrote: "The setting of this light-weight comedy – an Advertising Agency – is novel; but the early promise of the material deteriorates into a tired domestic farce about the misunderstandings of a pair of remarkably naive newly-weds. Competently acted, the film is directed with a notable disregard of an often bright, amusing script."

Kine Weekly wrote: "The picture, like most farces, has many strings to its plot, but, although some are livelier and more relevant than others, all arc securely tied at the finish. Adrienne Corri acts with casy assurance as Debbie, Thorley Walters makes a handsome Charles, and Richard Wattis is worth his weight in gold as a fluttering 'key man.' The rest of the shrewdly chosen players also do their stuff. A lightly clad poster girl adds a touch of spice to the proceedings, and the staging is more than adequate."

Picturegoer wrote: "Adrienne Corri and Thorley Walters seldom miss a trick as the newlyweds. But it is Wattis, seen in the comparatively small part of a fluttering executive, who scores most of the laughs. What a performer!"

Picture Show wrote: "Lively comedy telling of the staff of a publicity firm and a young married couple fast setting up a home. It provides crisp and amusing dialogue, charming performances and gay entertainment."

The Daily Film Renter wrote: "Straightforwardly made, without pretensions this product supplies light-hearted and often laughable entertainment with pleasant romantic element. Acting and general production values are adequate for the purpose in hand, and the film makes a useful and sympathetic program-builder for general showing."

DVD Compare wrote, "it’s a film that is photographed in a very static way, in a studio setting (Shepperton Studios) and with much use of long takes and theatrical ‘side-on’ blocking of actors – but this fits the material like a glove. It's a funny, enjoyable film which also slyly comments on issues of gender at work and at home."

== Preservation status ==
Second Fiddle was missing from the BFI National Archive, and listed as one of the British Film Institute's "75 Most Wanted" lost films. It was subsequently found and from 2015 was commercially available on DVD.
