= I Think They Call Him John =

1964 British short film by John Krish

- Film still
- Directed by: John Krish
- Written by: John Krish
- Produced by: Jack Carruthers; Executive producer; Anne Balfour-Fraser
- Starring: John Cartner Ronson
- Narrated by: Victor Spinetti; Bessie Love
- Edited by: Kevin Brownlow
- Production company: Samaritan Films
- Release date: June 1964
- Running time: 28 minutes
- Country: United Kingdom
- Language: English

I Think They Call Him John is a 1964 British short film, written and directed by John Krish and produced by Jack Carruthers, with Anne Balfour-Fraser serving as the film's executive producer, for Samaritan Films. It is a narrated observation of an elderly, lonely man during one day of his life.

It was released at the Polish Film Festival in Warsaw.

== Narrative ==
An elderly man, Mr John Cartner Ronson (born 5 January 1889, died about 1965) has lost his wife some 9 years previously and now lives a humdrum life in a small flat on a modern housing estate. The film records him going about his daily routine, cleaning, preparing modest meals, caring for his pet budgerigar, even sleeping. The film is intended to demonstrate Mr. Cartner Ronson's solitude in old age and isolation from society in spite of the great contribution he has made in his earlier life as a miner, soldier and gardener. There is within the film an intention to rouse guilt for the lack of appreciation that modern societies provide for the elderly. Most of the film is shot inside the flat, with a few outside ones showing the density of the buildings in the wide world contrasted with the insularity of the man's existence. Throughout, the film the subject is afforded great tenderness, respect, and dignity.

== Production ==
The film was shot on 35 mm, black and white film by David Muir.

Recorded without sound, it is narrated by Victor Spinetti and Bessie Love.

== Reception ==
The Monthly Film Bulletin wrote: "This harrowing picture of the affluent society's Umberto D is stating such a recognisable truth that few could watch it unmoved. An old man's life has, in a way, become the ultimate expression of that much discussed twentieth century condition, the failure of communication – a thing so much sadder in practice than in theory. The film is shot lingeringly to extract every ounce of pity from an audience, and one remembers as characteristic a scene, photographed from the tidy, unused dining room through the hatch to the kitchen where the old man eats his lunch in isolation while the commentary tells us about the preparations for the crowded Sundays of his childhood when his mother used to say 'You never know who might come.'"

== Home media ==
The film is included in the BFI DVD compilation Shadows of Progress: Documentary Film in Post-War Britain 1951–1977.
