= Abominable fancy =

Eternal punishment of the damned in Hell would entertain the saved

The term "abominable fancy" was first used by Frederic Farrar for the long-standing Christian idea that the eternal punishment of the damned in Hell entertains the saved in Heaven. According to Philip C. Almond, this view was held by several Christian philosophers, including Augustine, Tertullian, Thomas Aquinas and Peter Lombard.
