= The Little Ballerina =

- Directed by: Lewis Gilbert
- Written by: Michael Barringer; Mary Cathcart Borer; Lewis Gilbert
- Produced by: Mary Field
- Starring: Yvonne Marsh; Marian Chapman
- Cinematography: Frank North
- Edited by: Cyril Randell
- Distributed by: General Film Distributors (UK); Universal Pictures (USA)
- Release date: 10 November 1947
- Running time: 61 minutes
- Country: United Kingdom
- Language: English

The Little Ballerina is a 1947 British drama film directed by Lewis Gilbert.

== Cast ==
- Yvonne Marsh as Joan
- Marian Chapman as Sally
- Kay Henderson as Pamela
- Doreen Richards as Lydia
- Anita Holland as Carol
- Beatrice Varley as Mrs. Field
- Herbert C. Walton as Grandpa
- George Carney as Bill
- Anthony Newley as Johnny
- Martita Hunt as Miss Crichton
- Leslie Dwyer as Barney
- Eliot Makeham as Mr. Maggs
- Margot Fonteyn as herself
