= The Battle of Godfrey's Cottage =

Episode of the British sitcom Dad's Army

- Dad's Army episode
- Episode no.: Series 2 Episode 2
- Directed by: David Croft
- Story by: Jimmy Perry and David Croft
- Original air date: 8 March 1969
- Running time: 30 minutes

Episode chronology
← Previous "Operation Kilt"	Next → "The Loneliness of the Long Distance Walker"

"The Battle of Godfrey's Cottage" is an episode in the British comedy series Dad's Army. It was originally transmitted on Saturday 8 March 1969.

== Synopsis ==
Hearing the church bells ring (which is the signal indicating the start of a German invasion), Mainwaring, Jones and Frazer go to Godfrey's cottage to defend an important crossroads nearby. Wilson, Pike and Walker also hear the bells and take up positions in the summerhouse. Both groups mistake the other group for Germans.

(This should not be confused with the Dad's Army (1971 film) where workmen arrive at the church to take away its bells to be melted down into weapons. The Vicar decides to give them one last ring, which is mistaken for an invasion alert and causes the platoon to barricade the main road).

== Plot ==
While most of the platoon are on their way to the cinema to see a training film, the church bells ring, and Mainwaring, Jones and Frazer take up a defensive position at Godfrey's cottage. Wilson, Pike, Walker and Sponge are unable to find the others, and, leaving Sponge behind at the command post, head to Godfrey's cottage. There they see Jones, wearing one of Godfrey's old German helmets, and fire at him. Meanwhile, Godfrey's sisters shake a tablecloth out of the window, which is interpreted by Wilson as a surrender. In the end, Sponge starts firing on Mainwaring and Wilson.

== Cast ==
- Arthur Lowe as Captain Mainwaring
- John Le Mesurier as Sergeant Wilson
- Clive Dunn as Lance Corporal Jones
- John Laurie as Private Frazer
- James Beck as Private Walker
- Arnold Ridley as Private Godfrey
- Ian Lavender as Private Pike
- Janet Davies as Mrs Pike
- Amy Dalby as Dolly
- Nan Braunton as Cissy
- Bill Pertwee as ARP Warden Hodges
- Colin Bean as Private Sponge

== Notes ==
1. This programme was formerly one of the missing Dad's Army episodes and was thought to be irretrievably lost for many years. However, in June 2001 this episode and Operation Kilt were returned to the BBC. The film cans were in a poor condition and the film itself had seriously deteriorated. Following restoration by BBC technicians, it was repeated.
2. This episode was originally titled "The Battle of Mon Repos".
3. Amy Dalby, who featured as Dolly Godfrey, died on 10 March 1969, two days after this episode was broadcast. She was replaced by Joan Cooper, Arthur Lowe's wife, when the character reappeared in later episodes.
4. This episode contains an anachronism, with the platoon preparing to watch the film Next of Kin (a real British propaganda film made, and screened, in 1942 to promote the British government message to the general public that "Careless talk costs lives"). However, according to dialogue spoken by the Verger in the much later series three episode Room at the Bottom (regarding the recent sinking of the German Battleship Bismarck), the events of that episode were set on either 27 or 28 May 1941, meaning that "The Battle for Godfrey's Cottage" must be set at the very least twelve months before the release of the film in UK cinemas.
5. It is never explained in the episode why the church bells were rung in the first place (which sets the series of events in the episode in motion). This error is corrected in the radio episode, where it is explained near the end of the episode that the bells were rung due to a ‘false alarm’.
