= Who Killed the Cat? =

1966 British crime film by Montgomery Tully

- Opening titles
- Directed by: Montgomery Tully
- Screenplay by: Maurice J. Wilson; Montgomery Tully
- Based on: play Tabitha by Arnold Ridley and Mary Cathcart Borer
- Produced by: Maurice J. Wilson
- Starring: Mary Merrall; Ellen Pollock; Amy Dalby
- Cinematography: Geoffrey Faithfull
- Edited by: Peter Musgrave
- Music by: Carlo Martelli
- Production company: Eternal Films
- Distributed by: Grand National Pictures (UK)
- Release date: 7 October 1966 (UK)
- Running time: 76 minutes
- Country: United Kingdom
- Language: English

Who Killed the Cat? is a 1966 British crime film directed by Montgomery Tully and starring Mary Merrall, Ellen Pollock and Amy Dalby. The screenplay was by Maurice J. Wilson and Tully, based on the 1956 play Tabitha by Arnold Ridley and Mary Cathcart Borer.

== Plot ==
Three elderly spinsters become amateur detectives when someone poisons their beloved cat (Tabitha). The three determine the cat was poisoned by their mean landlady and they decide to take revenge. They plan to murder the landlady, but fate takes a hand in matters.

== Cast ==
- Mary Merrall as Janet Bowering
- Ellen Pollock as Ruth Prendergast
- Amy Dalby as Lavinia Goldsworthy
- Mervyn Johns as Henry Fawcett
- Vanda Godsell as Eleanor Trellington
- Conrad Phillips as Inspector Bruton
- Natasha Pyne as Mary Trellington
- Ronald Adam as Gregory
- Philip Brack as Police Sergeant Rawlings
- Inigo Jackson as Doctor Brentwood
- Joan Sanderson as Mrs Sandford
- Gregory Phillips as Peter Parsons

== Critical reception ==
The Monthly Film Bulletin wrote: "An antediluvian stage play given appropriately primitive dialogue and direction, saved to a degree that it does not deserve by the faultless performances of Mary Merrall, Ellen Pollock and Amy Dalby as three slightly weird old ladies. A word of praise, too, for Vanda Godsell's vixenish, vulgar personification of all that is monstrous in money-grabbing landladies."

Kine Weekly wrote: "This is a typical who-dunnit story in which almost anybody could be the guilty party and the fact that the only 'murderer' was the corpse provides a pleasant twist. As entertainment, however, it suffers from a lack of cinematic ideas, both in script and direction. It is, in fact, hardly more than a collection of competent actors and actresses acting a play. The words, interesting and informative though they are, seem to go on and on and too little of the plot is told in action or by the moving nature of motion pictures. However, the twist ending is pretty well concealed, and the whole is partly redeemed by the excellent cast."

The Radio Times called it a "strange, dated mystery,"

TV Guide wrote "This little film has a strange premise, to say the least."
