= Operation Kilt =

Episode of the British sitcom Dad's Army

- Dad's Army episode
- Episode no.: Series 2 Episode 1
- Directed by: David Croft
- Story by: Jimmy Perry and David Croft
- Original air date: 1 March 1969
- Running time: 30 minutes

Episode chronology
← Previous "Shooting Pains"	Next → "The Battle of Godfrey's Cottage"

"Operation Kilt" is an episode in the British comedy series Dad's Army. It was originally transmitted on Saturday 1 March 1969.

== Synopsis ==
The platoon have to defend the church hall from a platoon of Highlanders on an exercise.

== Plot ==
Captain Mainwaring leads the platoon in required PT exercises, being briefly interrupted by some rowdy boys and then Mrs Pike, who brings a rifle bolt Private Pike left at home and that she cleaned in the sink. After Mainwaring hurts his back during some toe touching due to his lumbago, Captain Ogilvie of the Highland Unit arrives and helps him before informing the men that they are to participate in a training exercise where the Highlanders will attempt to capture the platoon's headquarters, starting at 10pm the following night. A complicated system of paints will be used to mark the dead, wounded, and captured. Ogilvie is dismissive of the group's competency as soldiers and punches Pike in the stomach to test him, only to recoil in pain while Pike does not even flinch. After Ogilvie leaves, it turns out he punched Pike's rifle bolt which Pike had earlier put down his vest.

The platoon decides to sneak into the Highlanders' headquarters at a local farm to spy on them, so Privates Walker and Frazer "borrow" a pantomime cow costume. Mainwaring dismisses the idea, insisting it will not work, but Walker and Frazer decide to try anyway, only to return bruised and battered after running into a bull while trying to cross a field. Sergeant Wilson then suggests a Trojan Horse, with a haycart containing a platoon member being placed at the farm. After Pike turns out to have hay fever, Corporal Jones acts as the spy and discovers that the Highlanders plan to start an hour early and sneak through the woods to get to Walmington-on-Sea.

Early that night, Mainwaring leads the platoon in rigging all the paths through the woods with man traps inspired by a Tarzan film. Seven of the traps work, but when Jones goes to lead the last man into the eighth trap, he gets caught himself. As the platoon rescue him, they find themselves at the mercy of Captain Ogilvie, the last free member of the Highland Unit. Declaring that they are now all "dead", Ogilvie goes to snatch their paint, only to blunder into the man trap. Mainwaring and Wilson are disgusted as they suddenly discover what Scotsmen really wear under their kilts.

== Cast ==
- Arthur Lowe as Captain Mainwaring
- John Le Mesurier as Sergeant Wilson
- Clive Dunn as Lance Corporal Jones
- John Laurie as Private Frazer
- James Beck as Private Walker
- Arnold Ridley as Private Godfrey
- Ian Lavender as Private Pike
- Janet Davies as Mrs Pike
- James Copeland as Captain Ogilvie
- Colin Daniels as Small Boy

== Notes ==
1. This programme was formerly one of the missing Dad's Army episodes and was thought to be irretrievably lost for many years. However, in June 2001 this episode and The Battle of Godfrey's Cottage were returned to the BBC. The film cans were in a poor condition and the film itself had seriously deteriorated. Following restoration by BBC technicians, it was repeated.
2. The second series was scheduled originally to be broadcast in January 1969. Instead, the BBC decided to repeat the first series in January 1969 because they believed many people had missed the series when it had started in the summer of 1968.
