= The Lamp in Assassin Mews =

1962 British film by Godfrey Grayson

- UK theatrical release poster
- Directed by: Godfrey Grayson
- Written by: Mark Grantham (as MM McCormick)
- Produced by: Brian Taylor
- Starring: Francis Matthews; Lisa Daniely; Ian Fleming; Amy Dalby
- Cinematography: Lionel Banes
- Edited by: John Dunsford
- Music by: Bill LeSage
- Production company: Danziger Productions
- Distributed by: United Artists
- Release date: 1962
- Running time: 65 minutes
- Country: United Kingdom
- Language: English

The Lamp in Assassin Mews is a 1962 British black comedy second feature ('B') crime film directed by Godfrey Grayson and starring Francis Matthews, Lisa Daniely and Ian Fleming. It was written by Mark Grantham (as MM McCormick).

The film's plot concerns opposition to a local council's plans to modernise an area, which includes murder.

== Plot ==
Modernising council leader Jack Norton becomes the target of a couple of elderly serial killers when he supports plans to remove the last gas lamp in their street. Ultimately a compromise is reached: the lamp remains, but with an electric bulb.

== Cast ==
- Francis Matthews as Jack Norton
- Lisa Daniely as Mary Clarke
- Ian Fleming as Albert Potts
- Amy Dalby as Victoria Potts
- Ann Sears as Ruth
- Anne Lawson as Ella
- Derek Tansley as Jarvis
- John Lewis as Harpingdon
- Ann Lancaster as Mrs Dowling
- Colin Tapley as Inspector
- Douglas Ives as Gault
- Dorothea Phillips as Mrs Burke

== Reception ==
The Monthly Film Bulletin wrote: "A curious blend of romance and comedy tinged with drama, the story is puerile, and many might feel that the murderous old pair, likeable though they may be, are not at all funny. Undeniably this sort of macabre comedy has been done successfully before, but here it does not come off. The musical score makes extensive use of a motif which appeared briefly in Three Spare Wives."

In the Radio Times, David Parkinson wrote: "Francis Matthews demonstrates his flair for genteel farce in this ghoulish comedy. He plays council leader Jack Norton, who is determined to modernise his London borough, and plans to remove the city's last gas streetlight from outside his home on Assassin Mews. However, his elderly neighbours (Amy Dalby and Ian Fleming) plot to stop him by any means necessary. Dalby and Fleming are splendidly dotty in the Arsenic and Old Lace-style subplot, which involves a trio of missing vacuum-cleaner salesmen. Less agreeable is the romance between Matthews and Lisa Daniely as the leader of the anti-modernisation campaign, which involves too many complications and plot contortions to convince. Nevertheless, this Danziger production has a likeable Ealing vibe and should interest fans of Matthews who know him better as Paul Temple and the voice of Captain Scarlet."

In their book The British 'B' Film, Steve Chibnall and Brian McFarlane call the film "a sub-Ealing crime comedy."

== See also ==
- Arsenic and Old Lace - A black comedy about an elderly pair of serial killers
