= Talbot Baines Reed =

English author (1852–1893)

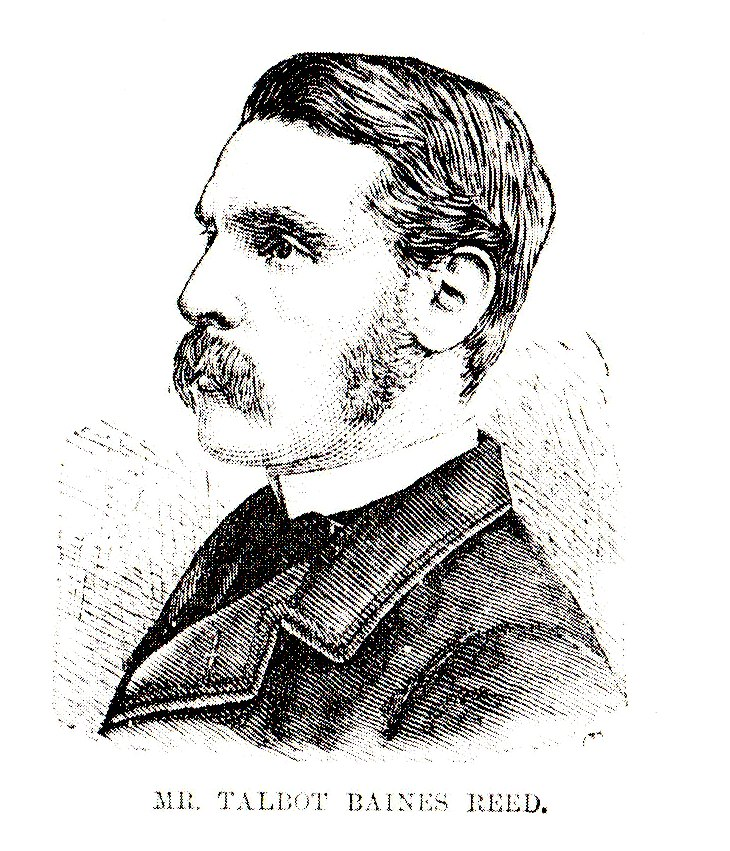
- Pen-and-ink portrait of Reed, c. 1880
- Born: 3 April 1852; Hackney, London, England
- Died: 28 November 1893 (aged 41); Highgate, London, England
- Resting place: Abney Park Cemetery, London
- Occupations: Writer, Typefounder
- Spouse: Elizabeth Greer
- Children: 4
- Writing career
- Genre: Children's literature
- Notable works: The Fifth Form at St. Dominic's; The Cock-House at Fellsgarth; Tom, Dick and Harry etc.

Talbot Baines Reed (3 April 1852 – 28 November 1893) was an English writer of boys' fiction who established a genre of school stories that endured into the mid-20th century. Among his best-known work is The Fifth Form at St. Dominic's. He was a regular and prolific contributor to The Boy's Own Paper (B.O.P.), in which most of his fiction first appeared. Through his family's business, Reed became a prominent typefounder, and wrote a standard work on the subject: History of the Old English Letter Foundries.

Reed's father, Charles Reed, was a successful London printer who later became a Member of Parliament (MP). Talbot attended the City of London School before leaving at 17 to join the family business in Fann Street. His literary career began in 1879, when the B.O.P. was launched. The family were staunchly Christian, pillars of the Congregational Church, and were heavily involved in charitable works. However, Reed did not use his writing as a vehicle for moralising, and was dismissive of those early school story writers who did, such as Dean Farrar. Reed's affinity with boys, his instinctive understanding of their standpoint in life and his gift for creating believable characters, ensured that his popularity survived through several generations. He was widely imitated by other writers in the school story genre.

In 1881, following the death of his father, Reed became head of the company. By then he had begun his monumental history which was published in 1887. Along with his B.O.P. contributions Reed wrote regular articles and book reviews for his cousin Edward Baines's newspaper, the Leeds Mercury. He was a co-founder and first honorary secretary of the Bibliographical Society, and a trustee for his family's charities. All this activity may have undermined his health; after struggling with illness for most of 1893, Reed died in November that year, at the age of 41. Tributes honoured him both for his contribution to children's fiction and for his work as the definitive historian of English typefounding.

== Family background ==
Charles Reed MP, father of Talbot Baines Reed

The Reeds were descended from John Reed, a colonel in Oliver Cromwell's army during the English Civil War. The family was based in Maiden Newton in the county of Dorset before moving to London at the end of the 18th century. Talbot Reed's grandfather, Andrew Reed, was a minister of the Congregational Church and the founder of several charitable institutions, including the London Orphan Asylum and a hospital for the incurably sick. He was also a hymn-writer of repute; his "Spirit Divine, attend our prayers" is still found in several 20th- and 21st-century hymnals. (Note: This hymn is No. 239 in the revised (1950) version of Hymns Ancient and Modern.)

Andrew Reed had five sons, the third of whom, Charles Reed, was apprenticed in 1836 to a wool manufacturer in Leeds, Yorkshire, where he also became secretary of the local Sunday School union. Through this work he met Edward Baines, proprietor of the Leeds Mercury one of the town's two MPs. The Baines family had a strong tradition of public and political service; both of Edward Baines's sons followed him into Parliament, the elder, Matthew Talbot Baines, eventually reaching Cabinet rank. Charles Reed was attracted to the youngest Baines offspring, a daughter, Margaret, whom he married in 1844. By this time Charles had left the wool industry and returned to London, where he founded his first business, a printing firm.

The family settled in the London district of Hackney where Charles was active in public and religious affairs, with a particular interest in education. He became a member, and later chairman, of the London School Board, and helped to establish the Congregational Church Board of Education. From 1868 to 1881 he was one of Hackney's MPs. He also raised a family of five sons, the third of whom, named Talbot Baines after his distinguished uncle, was born at the family home, "Earlsmead", on 3 April 1852. Over the years, Charles expanded his business interests, and by 1861 had prospered sufficiently to acquire the Thorowgood type foundry in Fann Street, City of London.

== Early life ==
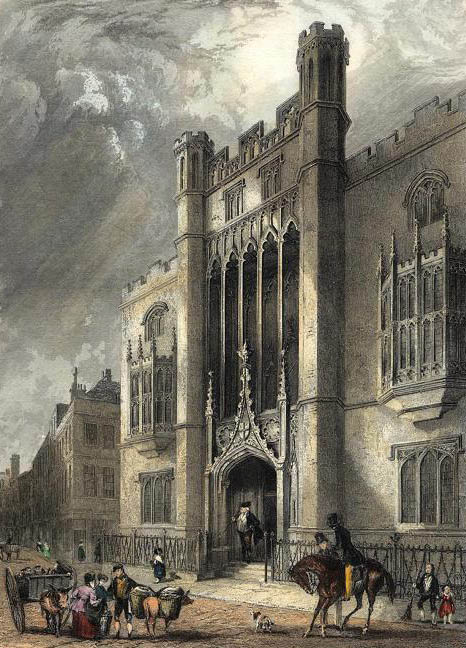
The City of London School in Milk Street, Cheapside

Talbot Baines Reed grew up in a happy household, dominated by Charles Reed's religious zeal and his belief that hardy outdoor sports were the best means for bringing up boys. This atmosphere of "simple, cheerful Puritanism" was, according to a friend, "eminently suited to [Talbot's] character and disposition". Talbot began his education at Priory House School, Clapton, and in 1864 became a day pupil at the City of London School, a relatively new foundation that had been established in Milk Street, Cheapside, in 1837. Talbot's eldest brother, Charles junior, had been notably successful there, as captain of the school and a leading figure in its cricket and football teams. Talbot soon made his own mark, particularly on the sporting field; a contemporary describes him as "full of life and vigour ... his strength of muscle, length of limb, boldness of attack, absolute fearlessness and perfection of nerve always made him conspicuous". Reed later showed some reticence about his academic achievements, asserting that one of his few successes was winning "the comfortable corner desk near the fire", reserved for the bottom place in Mathematics. In fact, in keeping with the school's record of producing men of letters and language scholars, Reed had excellent results in French, Greek and Latin, and had competed for the Sixth Form Latin prize. One of his school contemporaries was H. H. Asquith, the future British prime minister.

Despite evidence of considerable academic ability, Reed did not follow his brother Charles, who went on from the school to Trinity College, Cambridge. Instead, in 1869, Reed left the school to join the family firm, known as Sir Charles Reed & Sons or informally as the Fann Street Foundry, beginning a lifelong association with the printing trade. He found time, however, to pursue many other interests, physical, artistic and intellectual. Twice he walked the 53 miles (85 km) from London to Cambridge, each time leaving on Friday afternoon and arriving at St John's College for breakfast on Saturday. Reed was a competent swimmer, and won a Royal Humane Society medal for saving a cousin from drowning in rough seas. He was an accomplished pianist, a skilful pen-and-ink illustrator, and had an engaging style of writing. These artistic talents were put to service in the production of a family magazine, The Earlsfield Chronicle, which Reed edited (and largely wrote) from the mid-1870s. The magazine circulated only among the extended Reed family, and included serious articles ("Is total abstinence a moral duty?") alongside comic verses and cartoons.

== Printer and typefounder ==
The Caxton Exhibition, South Kensington, July 1877. In this illustration, W.E. Gladstone stands centre picture; on the right are William Blades (bearded) and, far right, Charles Reed

Although Reed would later jokingly describe his work for the family firm as "drudgery", in reality he was enthusiastic about the trade and worked hard to master it. Early in his career he met the leading printer and bibliographer of the day, William Blades, from whom he acquired a lasting fascination with the printing and typefounding crafts. While still relatively inexperienced, Reed was asked by Blades to help organise a major exhibition to mark the 400th anniversary of William Caxton's printing of The Game and Playe of the Chesse. This was thought to be the first book printed in England, in 1474, and the exhibition was originally planned for 1874. However, Blades's research indicated that Caxton's first printing in England had been in 1477, of a different book: The Dictes and Notable Wise Sayings of the Philosophers, so the quatercentenary celebrations were rescheduled accordingly. (Note: In a 1947 study, Robert H. Brown dates Caxton's London printing of the chess book to 1486.) The exhibition was held during the summer of 1877, at South Kensington, and was opened by William Gladstone, the former and future prime minister. It included displays of Caxton's printed works, together with many examples of printing through the intervening years. Reed contributed an essay to the exhibition's catalogue, entitled "The Rise and Progress of Type-Founding in England". The exhibition was supported by leading London printers, publishers, booksellers, antiquarians and scholars, and attracted wide public interest.

Sir Charles Reed, who had been knighted on Gladstone's recommendation in 1874, died in 1881. A few months later, Talbot's elder brother Andrew retired from the business because of ill health. As a result, at the age of 29, Talbot became the sole managing director of the Fann Street business, a position he held until his death. In 1878, in response to a suggestion from Blades, Reed began work on a general history of typefounding in England, a task which occupied him intermittently for nearly ten years. Published by Elliot Stock in 1887 under the title of History of the Old English Letter Foundries, the book became a standard text on the subject. Its 21 chapters are illustrated throughout with examples of typefaces and symbols used for four centuries. The text is presented in modern style, but with the initial letter of each chapter ornately drawn from a 1544 pattern. (Note: A new edition was brought out in 1952 to mark the centenary of Reed's birth, edited by Alfred F. Johnson, but Johnson's additional text is often silently added into Reed's text without clarification. Mosley writes that it "is (notwithstanding its many virtues) something of an editorial disaster" and recommends that readers cross-check Johnson's and Reed's editions side-by-side.) Also in 1887 Reed produced a revised and enlarged specimen book for the Fann Street foundry, with many new typeface designs and artistic ornamentations.

As an acknowledged expert in his field, Reed was in demand as a lecturer to learned societies. Among the papers he delivered were "Old and New Fashions in Typography", to the Royal Society of Arts in 1890, and "On the Use and Classification of a Typographical Library", to the Library Association in 1892. After Blades's death in 1890, Reed prepared his former mentor's unfinished Pentateuch of Printing for publication, adding a long memorial tribute to Blades. His foundry cast custom type such as the Golden Type for William Morris's Kelmscott Press in 1890 and Reed persuaded Morris to deliver a lecture on "The Ideal Book" for the Bibliographical Society in 1893.

== The Boy's Own Paper ==
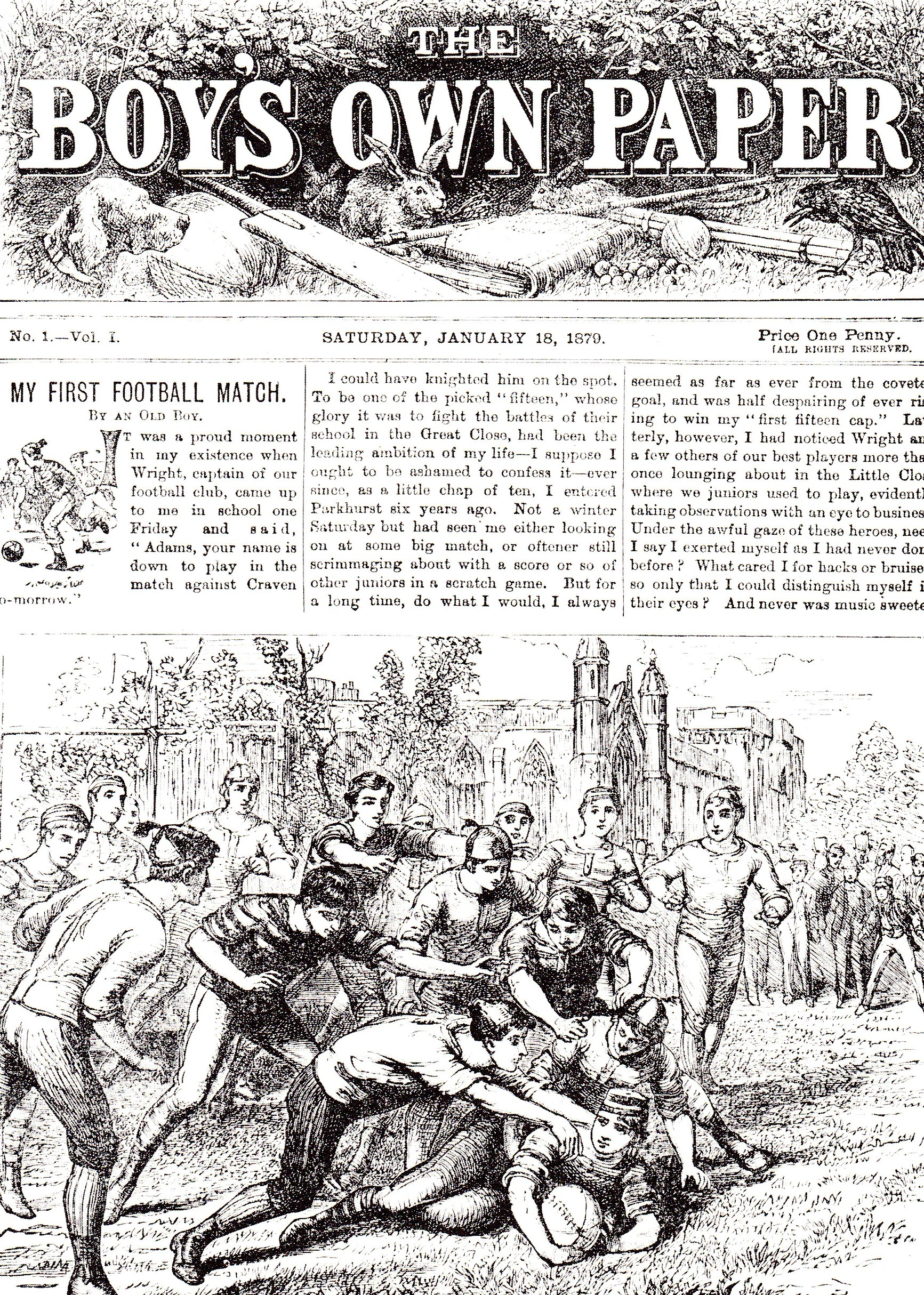
Issue No. 1 of The Boy's Own Paper, 18 January 1879, with Reed's short story "My First Football Match"

The Reed family had longstanding connections with The Religious Tract Society (RTS), which had been founded in 1799 to publish and disseminate material of a Christian nature. Talbot's grandfather Andrew Reed, at the age of 12, had attended the Society's inaugural meeting; Charles Reed and his eldest son, Charles junior, were both active members. On 23 July 1878 an RTS subcommittee (including both Charles Reeds) recommended the publication of "a magazine for Boys to be issued weekly at a price of one penny". Although the Society had frequently expressed a desire to counter the "cheap and sensational" magazines that were read by young people, its main committee was initially hesitant about this proposal, fearing its financial implications. Finally, however, it felt obliged "to attempt an enterprise from which others shrank". Thereafter the committee moved swiftly, and the first issue of the new publication, The Boy's Own Paper, was on sale on 18 January 1879.

Although at that time his writing experience was limited, Reed was asked by his father and brother to contribute to the new venture, a challenge he accepted enthusiastically. Apart from his stories for The Earlsfield Chronicle, his sole prior experience of magazine writing had been an article entitled "Camping Out", for the Edinburgh-based young peoples' magazine Morning of Life. This account of a boating excursion on the Thames had appeared in 1875. For the first issue of the B.O.P., Reed wrote a school story, "My First Football Match" which, accompanied by a half-page illustration, appeared on the front page "by An Old Boy". The story was very well received, and prompted demands for more about "Parkhurst", the school where the football match was played. Reed responded with several more tales, among which were "The Parkhurst Paper Chase" and "The Parkhurst Boat Race".

In the new magazine's first year Reed was a regular contributor of articles and stories on a range of subjects, joining distinguished writers such as G. A. Henty, R.M. Ballantyne and Jules Verne. A prominent illustrator for the magazine was the artist and mountaineer Edward Whymper. Reed's association with the B.O.P. lasted for the remainder of his life; the magazine would be the initial publisher for almost all his subsequent output of fiction. This commitment to the B.O.P. delayed progress on his History of the Old English Letter Foundries, especially as Reed began writing regular columns and book reviews for the Leeds Mercury, now edited by his cousin, the younger Edward Baines.

The 1880s was a decade of growing national prosperity, and increasing numbers of families from the expanding middle classes were sending their sons to boarding schools. The B.O.P. editor, George Hutchison, felt that such schools would provide the ideal setting for stories in which a boy hero (or heroes) could display Christian principles and strength of character in the face of temptations, and planned to run a long serial story. Reed, who had not himself attended a boarding school, was not the obvious choice as the writer. However, the skill and imagination he had displayed in his short school stories convinced Hutchison that Reed should be given the assignment.

== School stories ==
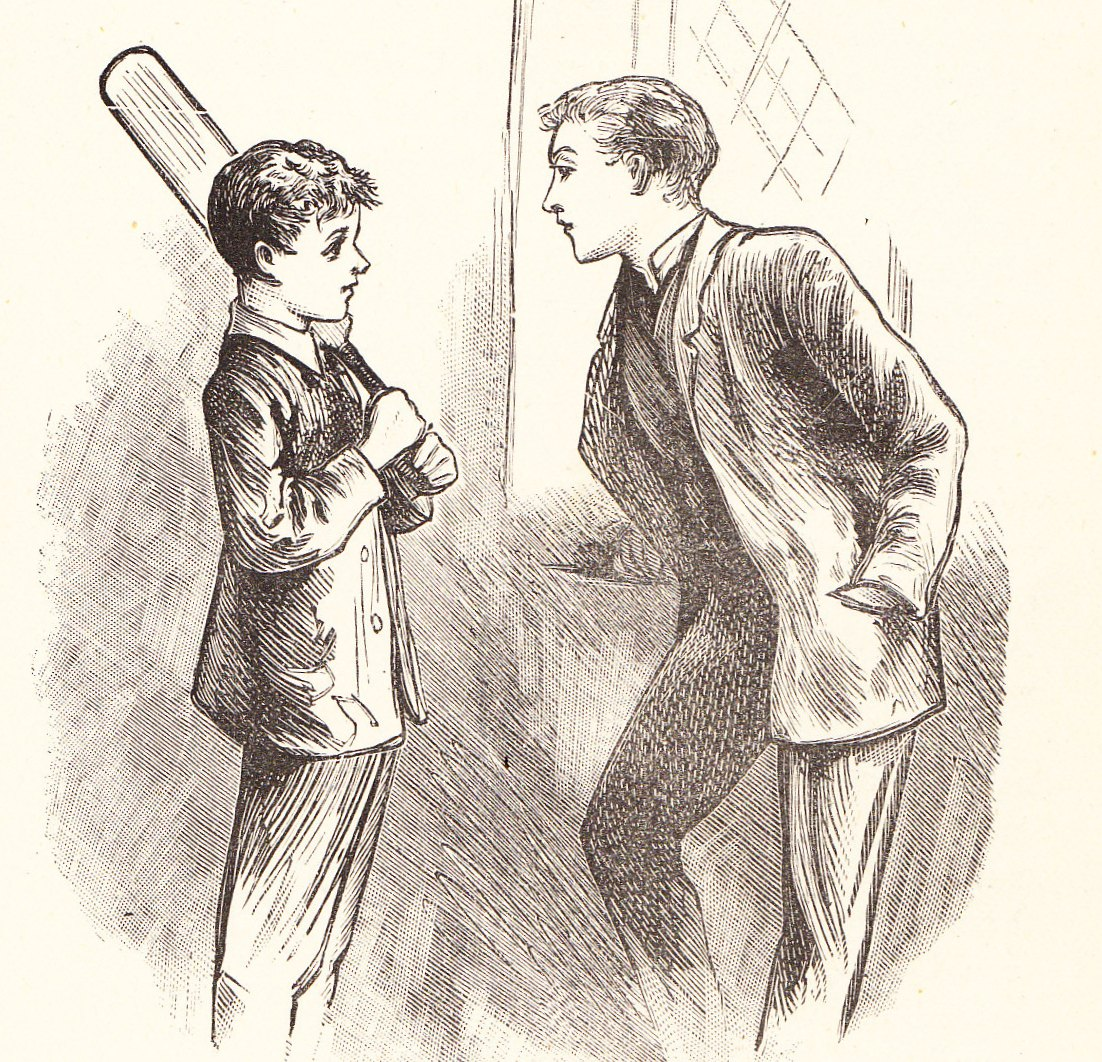
Boys at St. Dominic's: an illustration from the first book edition, 1887

Reed's first response to the request for school stories for The Boy's Own Paper was The Adventures of a Three-Guinea Watch, which ran for 19 instalments from October 1880 to April 1881. The travels of a schoolboy's pocket watch are charted through school, university and, finally, India at the time of the Indian Rebellion of 1857. The school, "Randlebury", is believed to be based, like "Parkhurst", on information Reed received from friends who had boarded at Radley. The success of the story encouraged the B.O.P.'s editors to ask Reed to attempt a longer and more ambitious work. The result was The Fifth Form at St. Dominic's, which became the favourite and most influential of all Reed's stories. Extended over 38 episodes, each a self-contained unit within an overall plot, this was the first of a sequence of school stories, all serialised in the B.O.P. The boarding school milieu was repeated, with a few variations, in The Willoughby Captains (serialised 1883–84), The Master of the Shell (1887–88), The Cock-House at Fellsgarth (1891) (Note: The term "Cock-House" refers to the champion house within the school. English schools were (and are) often divided into "houses" who compete against each other, particularly in games. See, for example, "Cock House trophy". Sir Thomas Rich's School. Archived from the original on 18 September 2008.) and Tom, Dick and Harry (1892–93). Reed followed the suggestion of his editors by setting My Friend Smith (1882–83) in a different kind of school, a "modest establishment for the backward and troublesome". It was, however, the boarding school stories that endured and which became the standard model for school stories for many decades. All the serials were quickly issued in book form, and most were reprinted for the benefit of successive generations of boys, up to the 1950s. The model was imitated or copied by other writers for the next half century; according to historian Isabel Quigly, "Reed was a better writer than his followers, and has been diminished by their imitations."

In a biographical sketch written in 2004, the historian Jeffrey Richards characterises Reed's work as a mixing of the earlier school story traditions established by Dean Farrar and Thomas Hughes, crafted with a vivid readability. Reed dismissed Farrar's Eric, or, Little by Little as a religious tract thinly disguised as a school story, and sought to produce something more "manly". Many of the incidents and characterisations introduced by Reed in St. Dominic's became standard elements in his subsequent stories, and in those of his imitators. Quigly lists among other recurrent features the stolen exam paper, the innocent who is wrongly accused and ultimately justified after much proud suffering, the boating accident, the group rivalries, the noble friendships. Adult characters are largely stereotypes: a headmaster known as "the Doctor" and modelled on Thomas Arnold of Rugby, "the jabbering French master (pointed beard and two-tone shoes)", the popular games master, the dry pedant, the generally comic domestic staff. Reed established a tradition in which the fictional boarding school was peopled by such characters and was almost invariably represented in terms of "dark passages, iron bedsteads, scratched desks, chill dormitories and cosy, shabby studies". Quigly suggests that one reason for the success of Reed's stories and their long-lasting appeal is that they are not so much books about school as books about people. John Sime of the RTS, in a memorial tribute to Reed after his death, notes that the boys in the stories are recognisably of flesh and blood, with "just that spice of wickedness ... without which a boy is not a boy".

== Personal life and other activities ==
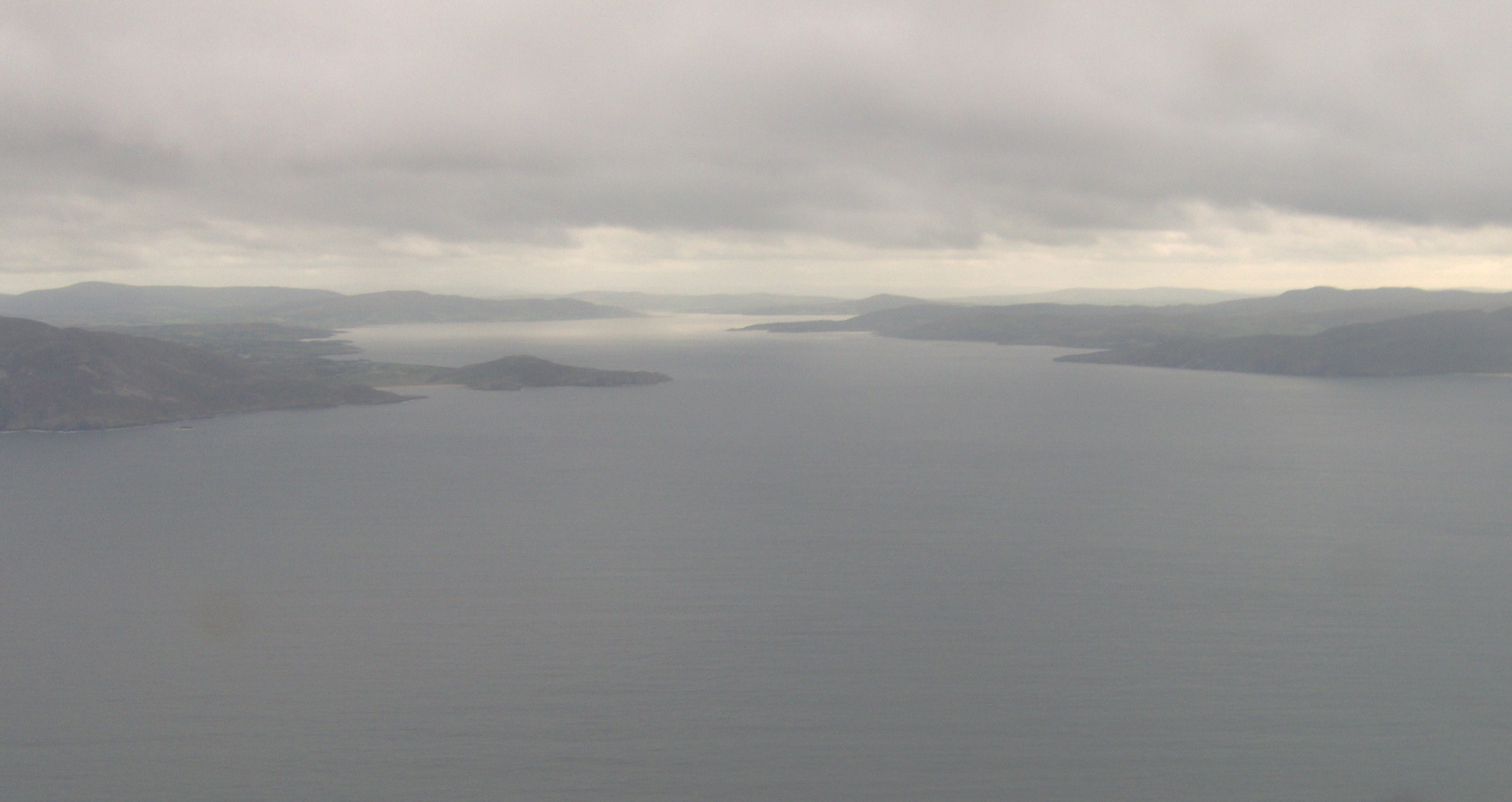
Lough Swilly, County Donegal, Ireland, the annual holiday destination for the Reed family

In 1876 Reed married Elizabeth Greer, the daughter of Samuel MacCurdy Greer, a County Court judge and former MP for the County of Londonderry in the north of Ireland. Their first child, a daughter, died in infancy, but three healthy children followed: Charles in 1879, Margaret in 1882 and Talbot in 1886. The connection with Ireland was of great value to Reed, and the family regularly spent annual holidays on the shores of Lough Swilly in County Donegal.

Reed was constantly busy; he held the "loafer"—defined by him as "anyone who worked from nine to five and did nothing with the rest of the day"—in contempt. Alongside his heavy schedule of duties at the foundry and his prolific writing, he took his share in the supervision of the various charities founded by his grandfather Andrew Reed, and was a deacon at his local Congregational Church. In 1892 he was a co-founder of the Bibliographical Society and its first honorary secretary, an office he modestly agreed to hold "pro tem in the hopes of your finding a better man".

Physically active and energetic, Reed keenly followed his old school's fortunes on the sports field, on one occasion writing anxiously to the school about its apparent loss of enthusiasm for football and cricket. As part of a busy social life he regularly attended City of London Old Boys' reunion dinners, and was a member of two London clubs, the Savile and the Reform. In politics Reed was a Liberal, although he disagreed with Gladstone's Irish Home Rule policy. His busy and fulfilling life was punctuated from time to time by private tragedies. The loss of his baby daughter was followed, soon after, by the death of his younger brother Kenneth, drowned with a companion in Lough Allen in County Leitrim, while exploring the River Shannon. In 1883 his elder brother, The Rev. Charles Reed, "my 'father confessor' in times of all trouble", died after a fall during a walking holiday in Switzerland.

== Death and legacy ==
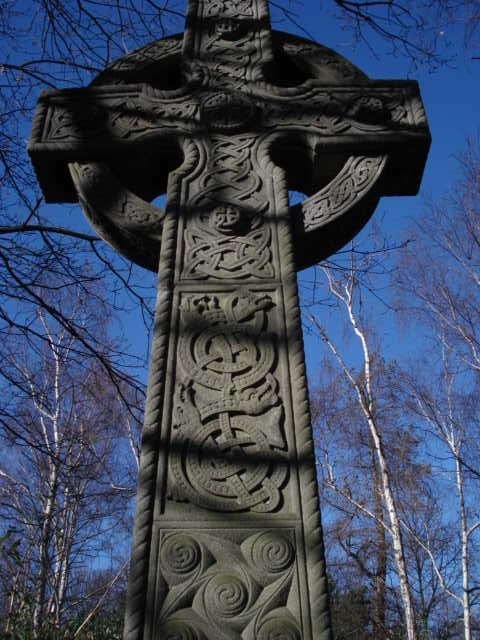
Reed's memorial stone in Abney Park cemetery

Reed generally enjoyed vigorous good health. However, early in 1893 there were signs that his workload was taking its toll. In January of that year he left London for an extended stay in Ireland, hoping to recover his energies. He returned to his various duties in May, but later in the summer became seriously ill with what was identified at the time as "consumption", and was probably pulmonary tuberculosis. He relinquished the secretaryship of the Bibliographical Society and returned to Ireland where, though largely confined indoors, he continued writing his regular weekly column for the Leeds Mercury and finished his final novel, Kilgorman. Letters to friends at home indicated that he remained in good spirits and was hopeful of recovery. However, his condition worsened, and he was advised to return home for urgent medical treatment. Back in London he wrote his last piece for the Mercury, a review of Seventy Years of Irish Life by W.R. Le Fanu. He died at his home in Highgate on 28 November 1893, aged 41, and was buried in Abney Park Cemetery, by the side of his father and grandfather.

Among the many tributes paid to Reed, Joseph Sime spoke for "the boys of the English-speaking world" who had "lost one of their best friends". Sime wrote of Reed's particular empathy with the young: "He possessed in himself the healthy freshness of heart of boyhood ... and could place himself sympathetically at the boy's standpoint in life." Reed's grave was visited by boys and their families for many years. He died a wealthy man, (Note: The probate value of Reed's estate was £21,305, which on the basis of the Retail Price Index (RPI) was worth approximately £1.75 million in 2010, or around £10 million on an average earnings basis.) although long before his death he had transferred the copyright of his books to the Religious Tract Society for a nominal sum.

Reed's regular readers included the young P.G. Wodehouse, who particularly loved the school stories. Wodehouse's literary biographer Benny Green, while excoriating Reed as a "hereditary prig" and a "religious huckster", accepts that he influenced Wodehouse, and cites in particular The Willoughby Captains. Green also echoes Quigly in asserting that none of Reed's successors could match his abilities as a storyteller. Quigly summarises Reed's legacy to future school story writers: he established a genre by "alter[ing] the shapeless, long-winded, garrulous and moralistic school story" into something popular and readable, a convention followed by all his successors. Reed himself expressed the guiding principles of his life in a letter addressed to a new Boys' Club in Manchester: "The strong fellows should look after the weak, the active must look after the lazy, the merry must cheer up the dull, the sharp must lend a helping hand to the duffer. Pull together in all your learning, playing and praying."

The grave in Abney Park was eventually surmounted by a memorial stone for Reed's family in the style of a Celtic cross, reflecting their connections to Ireland. It was cut by the O'Shea brothers' firm. Reed's biographer, the printing executive and historian Stanley Morison, suggests that Reed's legacy is his History of the Old English Letter Foundries, while Jack Cox, historian of the B.O.P, asserts that the school stories first serialised in the magazine are the writer's true memorial.

After Reed's death, Elizabeth Reed agreed that his considerable personal library should be given to the St Bride Foundation Institute, whose collection of typographic literature included the library of Reed's early mentor, William Blades. This collection now forms part of the St Bride Library, The books and collection of Reed's company, the Fann Street Foundry, went to first its later purchaser Stephenson Blake and then to the Type Museum collection.

== Bibliography ==
This does not include Reed's uncollected short stories, journalism or trade publications. All the school stories, and much of the other fiction, first appeared in The Boy's Own Paper.

=== Fiction ===
- The Adventures of a Three Guinea Watch Serialised in B.O.P. 1880–81. First published in book form by The Religious Tract Society, London, 1883.
- The Fifth Form at St. Dominic's Serialised in B.O.P. 1881–82. First published in book form by The Religious Tract Society, London, 1887.
- My Friend Smith Serialised in B.O.P. 1882–83. First published in book form by The Religious Tract Society, London, 1889.
- The Willoughby Captains Serialised in B.O.P. 1883–84. First published in book form by The Religious Tract Society, London, 1887.
- Reginald Cruden; A Tale of City Life Serialised in B.O.P. 1885. First published in book form by The Religious Tract Society, London, 1903.
- Follow My Leader, or, The Boys of Templeton First published in book form by Cassell & Co., London, 1885.
- A Dog With a Bad Name Serialised in B.O.P. 1886–87. First published in book form by The Religious Tract Society, London, 1894.
- The Master of the Shell Serialised in B.O.P. 1887–88. First published in book form by The Religious Tract Society, London, 1901.
- Sir Ludar Serialised in B.O.P. 1889. First published in book form by The Religious Tract Society, London, 1889.
- Roger Ingleton, Minor First published in book form by The Religious Tract Society, London, 1891.
- The Cock-House at Fellsgarth Serialised in B.O.P. 1891. First published in book form by The Religious Tract Society, London, 1893.
- Tom, Dick and Harry Serialised in B.O.P. 1892–93. First published in book form by The Religious Tract Society, London, 1894.
- Kilgorman First published in book form by T. Nelson and Sons Ltd, London, 1895.
- Parkhurst Boys and Other Stories of School Life First published in book form by The Religious Tract Society, London, 1914.
- Boycotted and other stories 15 assorted short stories. First published in book form by The Religious Tract Society, London, 1917.

=== Non-fiction ===
- A History of the Old English Letter Foundries First published by Elliot Stock, London, 1887; reprinted in 1952 with editing by A.F. Johnson and Stanley Morison.
- The Pentateuch of Printing Main text by William Blades. Edited for publication by Talbot Baines Reed, with a memoir of Blades. First published by Elliot Stock, London. 1891.

== Works cited ==
- Bullen, George, ed. (1877). Caxton Celebration 1877: Catalogue. London: N Trübner & Co. ISBN 9781108073585.
- Cox, Jack (1982). Take a Cold Tub, Sir!: The Story of the Boy's Own Paper. Guildford, England: Lutterworth Press. ISBN 978-0-7188-2505-8.
- Donaldson, Frances (1983). P G Wodehouse. London: Futura. ISBN 978-0-7088-2356-9.
- Fyfe, Aileen Kennedy (2011). "The Religious Tract Society". In Murphy, James H. (ed.). The Irish Book in English 1800–1891. Oxford: Oxford University Press. ISBN 978-0-19-818731-8.
- Green, Benny (1981). P.G. Wodehouse: A Literary Biography. London: Pavilion Books. ISBN 978-0-907516-04-0.
- Morison, Stanley (1960). Talbot Baines Reed: Author, Bibliographer, Typefounder. Cambridge, England: Published by Stanley Morison: printed privately by the Cambridge University Press.
- Quigly, Isobel (1984). The Heirs of Tom Brown: The English School Story. Oxford, England: Oxford University Press. ISBN 978-0-19-281404-3.
- Sime, John (1895). In Memoriam: Talbot Baines Reed in Kilgorman: a story of Ireland in 1798. London: The Religious Tract Society.
