= Eric, or, Little by Little =

1858 book by Frederic Farrar

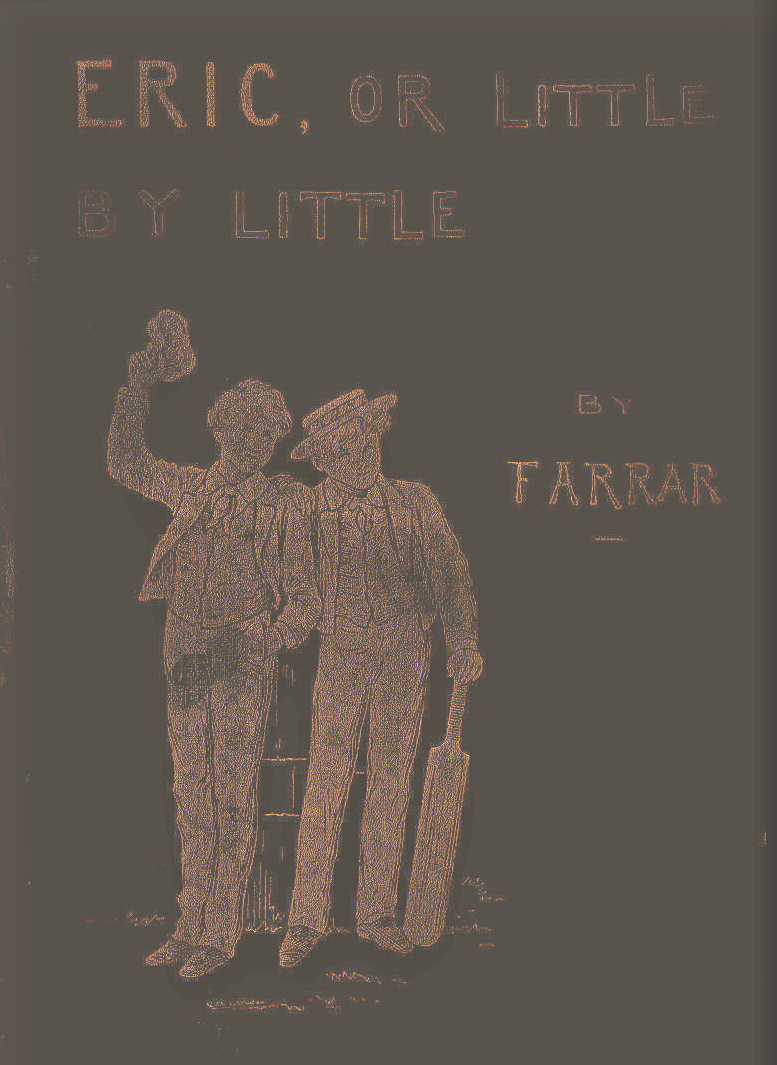
- Cover of the 1891 edition
- Author: Frederic W. Farrar
- Illustrator: Gordon Browne
- Language: English
- Genre: Novel
- Publisher: Adam & Charles Black, Edinburgh and London.
- Publication date: 1858
- Publication place: England
- Media type: Print (Hardback)

Eric, or, Little by Little is a book by Frederic W. Farrar, first edition 1858. It was published by Adam & Charles Black, Edinburgh and London. The book deals with the descent into moral turpitude of a boy at a boarding school or English public school of that era.

The author's preface to the fourth edition reads:

The story of 'Eric' was written with but one single object—the vivid inculcation of inward purity and moral purpose, by the history of a boy who, in spite of the inherent nobility of his disposition, falls into all folly and wickedness, until he has learnt to seek help from above. I am deeply thankful to know—from testimony public and private, anonymous and acknowledged—that this object has, by God's blessing, been fulfilled.

== Summary ==
Eric Williams is a son of a British colonial official and his wife stationed in India. As was common at the time of the British Raj, Eric is sent to Britain to be educated at a boarding school—in this case Roslyn School, where he encounters the good and bad aspects of the traditional public school.

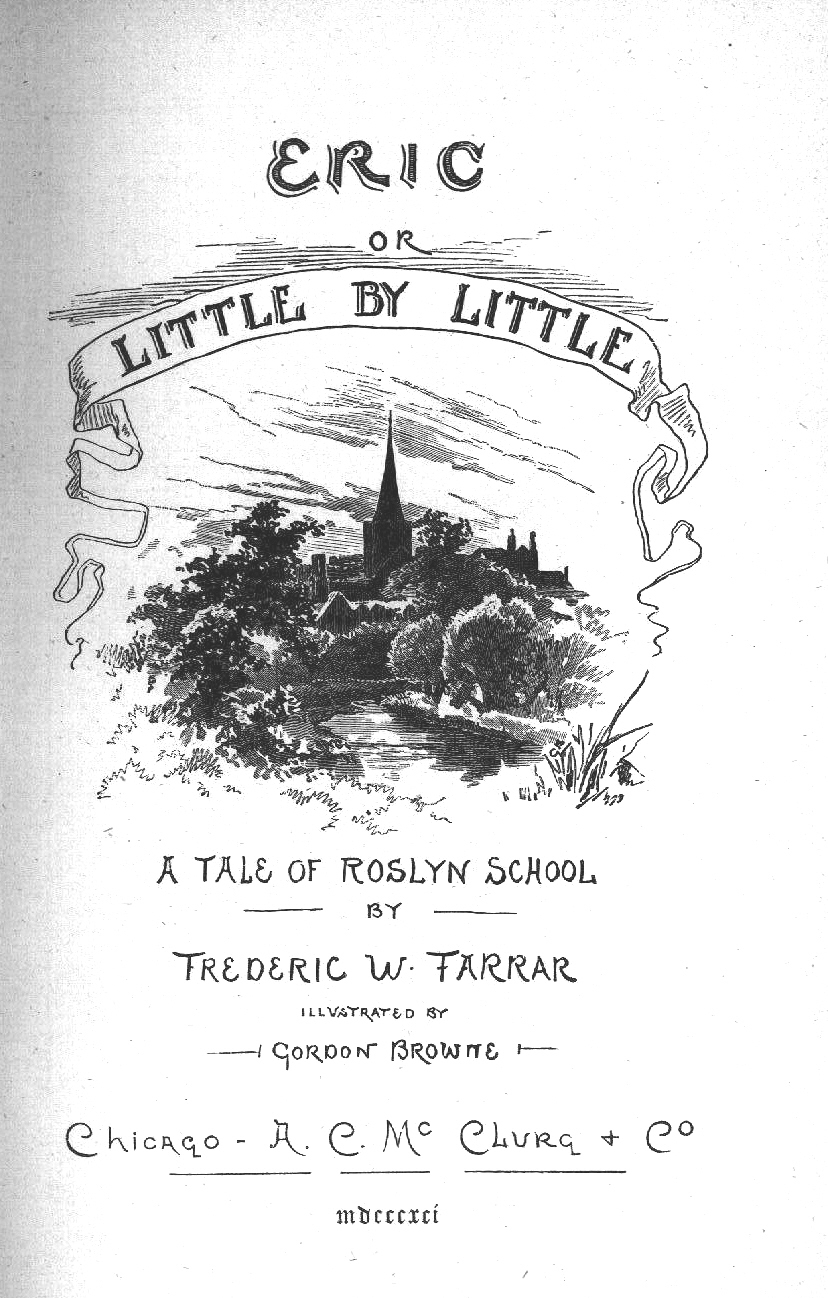
Title page from 1891 edition of the book.

He slowly gets beaten down by being punished erroneously for wrongdoings, getting bullied and such things as drinking, smoking and cheating. The end is tragic for Eric, as he loses everything.

== Background and reception ==
Along with Talbot Baines Reed's The Fifth Form at St. Dominic's and Thomas Hughes' Tom Brown's Schooldays, this book was one of the three most popular boys' books in mid-Victorian Britain. The school is a thinly disguised cross between Farrar's own school King William's College in the Isle of Man, and Marlborough College, at which he was the master.

The book is credited with helping to increase the popularity of the first name "Eric" in English-speaking countries—although not with Eric Arthur Blair (the writer and journalist George Orwell) who disliked his given name because of its association with Farrar's book.

In later years, it fell out of favour, in part because of its religious earnestness. For example, in Rudyard Kipling's Stalky & Co., published late in 1899, the protagonist Beetle and his friends frequently made fun of "Eric", e.g.

Besides, we ain't goin' to have any beastly Erickin.

E. Nesbit included it in a list of didactic children's books which were "impossible to read."

Frontispiece from the 1891 edition, with illustrations by Gordon Browne (1858–1932).
