= Amy Dalby =

English actress (1888–1969)

- Born: 3 January 1888; Clerkenwell, London, England
- Died: 10 March 1969 (aged 81); London, England
- Years active: 1938–1969

Amy Mary Dalby (3 January 1888 – 10 March 1969) was an English actress of stage and screen, often in kindly or eccentric spinster roles.

Amy first acted at the age of six. Her final performance was in the 8 March 1969 episode "The Battle of Godfrey's Cottage" of Dad's Army, portraying the sister of Private Godfrey. She died in London on 10 March—two days after the episode aired.

== Partial filmography ==
- On the Night of the Fire (1939) - Hospital Nurse (uncredited)
- Quiet Wedding (1941) - Miss Dacres (uncredited)
- Penn of Pennsylvania (1942) - Hannah - Penn's Maid (uncredited)
- The Night Has Eyes (1942) - Miss Miggs
- The Great Mr. Handel (1942)
- The Gentle Sex (1943) - Lady Behind the Bar at the Dance (uncredited)
- Variety Jubilee (1943) - A Suffragette (uncredited)
- Dear Octopus (1943) - (uncredited)
- Millions Like Us (1943) - Mrs. Bourne - Hostel Matron (uncredited)
- Waterloo Road (1945) - Maisie - Tillie's Aunt (uncredited)
- The Wicked Lady (1945) - Aunt Doll
- Pink String and Sealing Wax (1945) - Lady Customer In Shop (uncredited)
- Carnival (1946) - Aunt Mary (uncredited)
- The White Unicorn (1947) - Landlady (uncredited)
- My Sister and I (1948) - Female Cleaner
- It's Hard to Be Good (1948) - Bargee's Wife (uncredited)
- The Passionate Friends (1949) - Lady on underground (uncredited)
- Your Witness (1950) - Mrs. Widgely
- Home to Danger (1951) - Jessica Morton - Cook (uncredited)
- Brandy for the Parson (1952) - Postmistress
- Time Bomb (1953) - Sarah - Charlie's Wife (uncredited)
- The Straw Man (1953) - Lucy Graham
- The Man Upstairs (1958) - Miss Acres
- Further Up the Creek (1958) - Eadie Lovelace
- The Lamp in Assassin Mews (1962) - Victoria Potts
- The Haunting (1963) - Abigail Crain - Age 80 (uncredited)
- The Old Dark House (1963) - Gambler (uncredited)
- A Jolly Bad Fellow (1964) - Miss Crumb
- The Counterfeit Constable (1964) - Mrs. Throttle
- The Intelligence Men (1965) - Woman in Wardrobe Dept. (uncredited)
- The Secret of My Success (1965) - Mrs. Tate
- Fumo di Londra (1966) - Duchess of Bradford
- Who Killed the Cat? (1966) - Lavinia Goldsworthy
- The Spy with a Cold Nose (1966) - Miss Marchbanks
- Smashing Time (1967) - Demolished Old lady
