= The Salvage Gang =

1958 British film by John Krish

- Directed by: John Krish
- Screenplay by: John Krish
- Story by: Mary Cathcart Borer
- Produced by: Hindle Marriott Edgar
- Starring: Ali Allen; Amanda Coxell; Frazer Hines
- Cinematography: James Allen
- Edited by: David Howes
- Music by: Jack Beaver
- Production company: World Wide Pictures
- Release date: 1958
- Running time: 53 minutes
- Country: United Kingdom
- Language: English

The Salvage Gang is a 1958 British children's adventure comedy film directed by John Krish and starring Ali Allen, Amanda Coxell and Frazer Hines. It was written by Mary Cathcart Borer and Krish, and produced by World Wide Pictures for the Children's Film Foundation.

== Plot ==
Freddie and his friends Kim, Ali and Pat are building a rabbit hutch when they break a saw belonging to Pat's father. Wanting to replace it but having no money, they embark on a series of odd-jobs, but their attempts at painting, dog washing and car cleaning all misfire. They decide to collect salvage to sell. The younger children find an iron bedframe in the street and sell it to a scrap merchant, but it turns out that the bed was Freddie's, and was being moved to his new house. Finding that the bed has been re-sold, they set off across London to retrieve it.

== Cast ==
- Ali Allen as Ali
- Amanda Coxell as Pat
- Frazer Hines as Kim
- Christopher Warbey as Freddie
- Richard Molinas as Mr. Caspanelli
- Robin Ford as boat owner
- Charles Lamb as Shorty
- Charles Ross as Pat's father
- Bay White as Freddie's mother
- Brian Sunners as removal man Bill
- Hamlyn Benson as removal man Sam
- George Tovey as removal man Alf
- Harry Brunning as salvage depot owner
- Geoffrey Matthews as lorry driver
- Keith Pyott as man in telephone box
- Wilfrid Brambell as tramp

== Reception ==
The Monthly Film Bulletin wrote: "The idea of a group of children trundling an iron bedstead through the city streets is full of delightful possibilities, though here they are perhaps not exploited to the full; there are some weaknesses of plot and dialogue and firmer direction might have helped to cover deficiencies in the playing. But the children are well chosen, the London backgrounds are spendidly photographed and there is a jaunty and attractive score. An appealing film for adults as well as children."

The Manchester Guardian called the fim "a brisk, episodic, adventurous tale about a group of children who are, determined to earn an honest penny and find it very difficult to do so. Brisk action and the minimum of dialogue – these are, perhaps, the chief film-making principles observed by the makers of these films and they are certainly observed in The Salvage Gang. It is alsd characteristic in that it avoids 'goody goodiness' but does show honourable effort honourably (if comically) rewarded. Parents would approve of it: there seems no reason why even sophisticated children should not also approve."

In British Sound Films: The Studio Years 1928–1959 David Quinlan rated the film as "good", writing: "inventive children's film with well-used backgrounds."

Ben Walsh, writing in The Independent, called the film a "thoroughly charming short feature."

In Sight and Sound Nick Pinkerton wrote: "John Krish's The Salvage Gang, shot with his customary monochrome elegance and visual reflectiveness, winds dreamily across late-50s London as a reassuringly scruffy (even mildly multicultural) quartet chase odd jobs and a mislaid bedstead from Islington to Tower Bridge and back. Krish coaxes engaging if not naturalistic – performances from his young cast (CFF chief Mary Field preferred stage-school children with RP accents, for their supposed vocal clarity). But his gorgeous shots of a still-recovering London (St Paul's with a bomb-splintered pub in the foreground, a giddying shot of a crane snatching the bed on to a busy building site) give a sharp sense of time and place to Mary Cathcart Borer's gentle tale."

== Home media ==
The film is included on the DVD Children's Film Foundation Collection: Volume 1 – London Tales (British Film Institute, 2012).
