= Mary Cathcart Borer =

British writer and screenwriter (1906–1994)

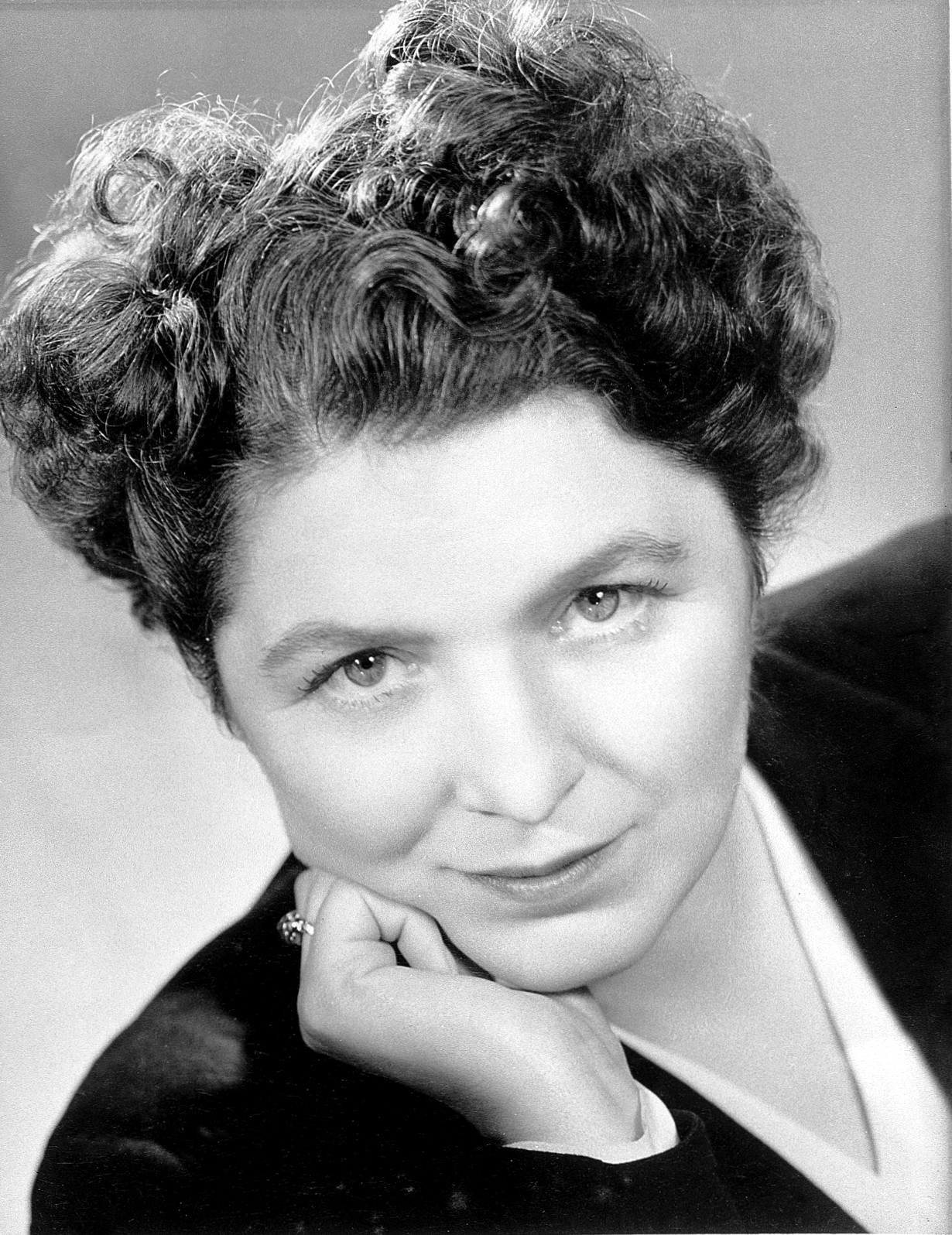
- Photograph of Mary Irene Cathcart Borer – Angus McBean, c. 1950
- Born: Mary Irene Cathcart Borer; 3 February 1906; Hackney, London, UKGBI
- Died: 2 December 1994 (aged 88); St. Albans, Hertfordshire, UK
- Other name: Mary Irene Cathcart Myers
- Education: University College London, Bachelor of Science, 1928
- Writing career
- Occupations: Writer; screenwriter; playwright; journalist; scientific researcher
- Pen name: Molly Myers; Egan Storm

Mary Cathcart Borer (married name Myers; 3 February 1906 – 2 December 1994) was a British writer, screenwriter, playwright, journalist and scientific researcher.

== Biography ==
Mary Irene Cathcart Borer was born on 3 February 1906 in Hackney, London to Florence Mary Borer (née Edmonds) and Archibald James Borer, a hospital secretary. Borer was baptised at the Parish Church of St Andrew, Stoke Newington in April 1906.

In 1928, Borer graduated from University College London with a Bachelor of Science. Borer initially worked as a scientific researcher at the then Wellcome Historical Medical Museum, before marrying the Egyptologist Oliver Humphrys Myers in 1935. From 1935–1937, Borer participated in two Egypt Exploration Society excavations directed by Myers at sites in Armant, Kingdom of Egypt (present-day, Egypt). The couple divorced sometime around 1939.

== Personal life ==
Borer died on 2 December 1994 in St Albans, and was living in the market town of Tring prior to her death.

== Publications ==
- Borer, Mary Cathcart (1937). Adventure in August. [A tale for children.]. London: Sir Isaac Pitman & Sons.
- Borer, Mary Cathcart (1963). Women who made History. With drawings by Moira Hoddell. London: Frederick Warne & Co.
- Borer, Mary Cathcart; Field, Agnes Mary (1950). The Secret Tunnel. The Book of the Mary Field Film. Adopted by M.C. Borer from the Original Screen Play, Etc. [With Plates.]. London: Sir Isaac Pitman & Sons.

=== Film adaptations ===
- The Secret Tunnel (1947), directed by William C. Hammond
- Who Killed the Cat? (1966) directed by Montgomery Tully. Based on the play Tabitha, co-written with Arnold Ridley)

== Selected filmography ==
=== Films ===
Year	Title	Role	Type	Notes	Ref(s)
1940	Old Mother Riley in Society	Screenwriter	Fiction	Co-written with Austin Melford and Barbara Emary. Original story by Kitty McShane	
1944	Tom's Ride	Story	Fiction	G.B. Instructional	
1947	Circus Boy	Screenwriter	Fiction	Children's Entertainment Films (CEF). Co-written with Cecil Musk. Original story by Patita Nicholson	
1953	The Dog and the Diamonds	Original story	Fiction	Children's Film Foundation (CFF). Screenplay by Patricia Latham.	
1958	Blow Your Own Trumpet	Screenwriter	Fiction	CFF	
1958	The Salvage Gang	Original story	Fiction	CFF. Screenplay by John Krish	
1963	Treasure in Malta	Adaptation	Fiction	CFF. Screenplay by Malcolm Stewart. Original story by Frank Wells.	
1965	Eagle Rock	Original story	Fiction	CFF. Screenplay by Henry Geddes	

=== Television ===
Year	Title	Role	Type	Notes	Ref(s)
1950	The Reluctant Dragon	Adaptation	Fiction	Original story by Kenneth Grahame.	
1955	Hand in Glove	Screenwriter	Fiction	TV movie	
1959	Four Feather Falls	Screenwriter	Fiction	How It Began (Pilot)	
1960	Four Feather Falls	Screenwriter	Fiction	Kidnapped	
1961	The Fifth Form at St. Dominic's	Adaptation	Fiction	4 part BBC children's serial. Co-adapted with C. E. Webber	
1961	The Secret of the Nubian Tomb	Screenwriter	Fiction	The Unexpected Visitors	
