= The Fifth Form at St. Dominic's =

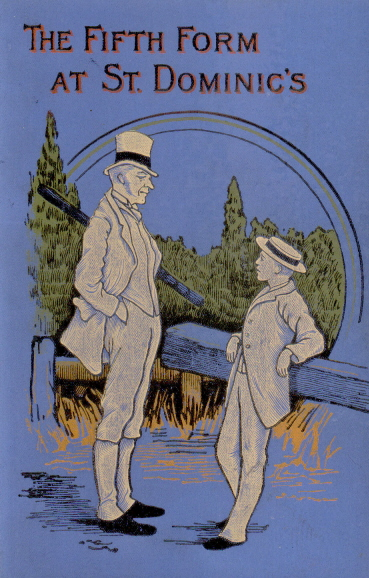
- Cover of the First Edition (1887)
- Author: Talbot Baines Reed
- Illustrator: Gordon Browne
- Language: English
- Genre: Novel
- Publisher: Religious Tract Society, London
- Publication date: 1887
- Publication place: England
- Media type: Print (Hardback)

The Fifth Form at St. Dominic's (published 1881) is the best known of the school stories by the late nineteenth century author Talbot Baines Reed. The stories as well as the book were written for the Boy's Own Paper and published by the Religious Tract Society, with illustrations by Gordon Browne. It was adapted into the 1921 film of the same name, and serialised for TV in four parts in 1961.

Reed had no personal experience of a public school education himself; consequently, the book lacked some of the realism of other comparable books like Tom Brown's Schooldays and Eric, or, Little by Little. It also avoids much of the overt moralising and sentimentality found in these books, though a muscular type of Christianity makes occasional appearances.

However, the book was written with great enthusiasm and it started a tradition of boarding school stories in British juvenile fiction that lasted until the end of World War II.

The plot revolves around the fall into turpitude of a senior schoolboy named Loman, under the influence of a manipulative and dissolute innkeeper. Loman's young protégé (his fag - a junior boy who acts as the unpaid servant of a senior) is also endangered by association with the innkeeper, but is eventually rescued by his older brother. This brother is falsely suspected of having cheated in a major examination and is ostracised by his fellow schoolmates. The plot is resolved by the vindication of the right-thinking and the forgiveness of those who have fallen into error. There is much coverage of schoolboy societies and the forms of self-governance that the scholars have established within their traditions, and of descriptions of various forms of sport.

== Adaptations ==
In 1961, the BBC produced a four part serial adaptation by Mary Cathcart Borer and C. E. Webber.

== Serialisation ==
The novel was serialised as a 14-part 2-page comic in Look and Learn magazine between December 1979 and March 1980.
