= Treasure in Malta =

- Telecard
- Directed by: Derek Williams
- Written by: Mary Catchcart Borer [screenplay]
- Produced by: William Freeman, Ralph May
- Distributed by: Anvil Films/Children's Film Foundation
- Release date: 1963
- Running time: 93 minutes
- Country: United Kingdom
- Language: English

Treasure in Malta is a 1963 adventure film and television series produced by Anvil Films, a British film company. It was funded by the Children's Film Foundation. The child stars were Mario Debono, Aidan Mompalao Depiro and Mary Lu Ripard in the title roles. Guido Saliba, a Maltese academic and brother-in-law of Maltese president Guido de Marco, plays the chief antagonist. Originally a six-part television series was made to be shown on the BBC. These were later cut down to make one feature film shown in UK cinemas as well as the US and, in 1966, in Germany. On television each episode had a title. These were:

1. Kidnapped
2. By Jiminy
3. Carnival
4. Escape to Gozo
5. At the Villa Rasa
6. The Tomb of Calypso

The titles were removed for the shorter film version.

Treasure in Malta was also aired as a five-part version in 1984 (repeated in 1986), as part of the BBC's afternoon children's programming block.

The screenplay was adapted by Anne Barrett and Mary Catchcart Borer from the novel By Jiminy Ahoy authored by David Scott Daniell and published by Hodder & Stoughton in 1962. It was directed by Derek Williams and produced by William Freeman and Ralph May.

== Plot ==
Two children are looking forward to spending an exciting holiday in Malta with their father, an English archeologist. But when dad fails to turn up at the airport, they befriend a peanut seller called Jimini. He manages to get them a cab to their father's house but, just that morning, the father has been kidnapped by a gang of thugs who know he is looking for a valuable treasure.
