= John Krish =

British film director and screenwriter (1923–2016)

John Jeffrey Krish (4 December 1923 – 7 May 2016) was a British film director and screenwriter. He directed and filmed much archive footage and in particular Our School in 1962, showing the changing ways of Britain's school and the last few years of the 11-plus exam.

In November 2010, the British Film Institute compiled four of Krish's documentary short films – The Elephant Will Never Forget (1953), They Took Us to the Sea (1961), Our School (1962) and I Think They Call Him John (1964) – as A Day in the Life: Four Portraits of Post-War Britain. This compilation won the award for Best Documentary for 2010 at the Evening Standard British Film Awards.

== Selected filmography ==
- General Election (1945, short film) – editor
- The Elephant Will Never Forget (1953, short film)
- Companions in Crime (1954)
- The Salvage Gang (1958)
- Captured (1959)
- Return To Life (1960, short film) – writer, director and narrator
- They Took Us to the Sea (1961) – writer and director
- Our School (1962) – writer and director
- The Wild Affair (1963) – writer and director
- Unearthly Stranger (1963)
- I Think They Call Him John (1964) – writer and director
- Decline and Fall... of a Birdwatcher (1968)
- The Man Who Had Power Over Women (1970)
- Drive Carefully, Darling (1975, short film) – director and co-writer
- The Finishing Line short (1977, short film) – director and co-writer
- Jesus (1979) – co-director
- Friend or Foe (1982)
- Out of the Darkness (1985) – writer, director and editor
