= Tony Selby =

English actor (1938–2021)

- Selby in Witchfinder General (1968)
- Born: Anthony Samuel Selby; 26 February 1938; Chelsea, London, England
- Died: 5 September 2021 (aged 83); Bayswater, London, England
- Education: Italia Conti Stage School
- Occupation: Actor
- Years active: 1945–2016
- Television: Get Some In!; Doctor Who; EastEnders
- Spouses: Jacqui Milburn (m. 1964; div. 1982) Gina Sellers (m. 1986)
- Children: 2

Anthony Samuel Selby (26 February 1938 – 5 September 2021) was an English actor. With a career that spanned 71 years, he was known for his roles as Corporal Percy Marsh in the ITV sitcom Get Some In! (1975–1978), Sabalom Glitz in the BBC science fiction television series Doctor Who (1986–1987) and Clive Mitchell in the BBC One soap opera EastEnders (2002).

== Early life ==
Anthony Samuel Selby was born in Chelsea, London, England on 26 February 1938, as the younger child to Samuel Joseph Selby, a taxi driver, and his wife, Annie Elizabeth (née Weaver), a seamstress and waitress. He had an elder sister, Kathleen Vera Keegan (née Selby).

Selby was brought up on the Peabody estate. He came from a family of taxi drivers and musical theatre performers. His father drove a black cab and was known as "taxi Sam". He performed in public for the first time at the age of seven, as Al Jolson, to sing for wounded wartime soldiers in London hospitals. He credited his start in showbiz to his maternal aunt, Helen "Nellie" Bone (née Weaver).

Selby trained in acting and dramatics at the Italia Conti Stage School for six years from the age of 10. He attended Buckingham Gate School in Victoria, a section of the City of Westminster, where he gained his School Certificate.

== Career ==
Selby made his professional debut in 1949, on stage, playing Curly in the annual production of Peter Pan at the Scala Theatre in Charlotte Street, Fitzrovia. He appeared in numerous theatre productions,including Joan Littlewood's Theatre Workshop.

He made his television debut at the age of 13, as a child actor, with the role of Pig in the television film, Mencius Was a Bad Boy (1951). He was billed as Anthony Selby until 1964. Selby appeared in various uncredited film roles, including in John and Julie (1955), Alfie (1966) and Carry On Loving (1970); he made his credited debut in 1961, with the role of Kishu in the military drama, The Queen's Guards. His film credits included; Witchfinder General (1968), Villain (1971), Adolf Hitler: My Part in His Downfall (1973), If You Go Down in the Woods Today (1981), and Loop (1997).

He appeared in many episodic television programmes, including; The Explorer (1955), King of the River (1966), The Avengers (1968), Callan (1972), Black and Blue (1973), The Sweeney (1975), Two's Company (1975), Bergerac (1984), Duty Free (1986), Lovejoy (1991), Renford Rejects (1998), Holby City (1999), Mike and Angelo (2000), and Rose and Maloney (2005). Selby played Fred in Edward Bond's controversial play Saved, at the Royal Court Theatre, in Sloane Square, in 1965, having joined the English Stage Company. Cameron Cobbold, 1st Baron Cobbold, then Lord Chamberlain, was appalled by Saved and refused to grant it a licence, so William Gaskill showed it to a private audience under "club conditions". Selby frequently worked with Ken Loach. In 1965, he played Danny Lee, a convict under sentence of death, in Three Clear Sundays, one of Loach's earlier productions for the BBC anthology series The Wednesday Play. Three Clear Sundays dealt with capital punishment and was broadcast to 11 million viewers at a time when the debate was at a height in the United Kingdom. His first television role for Loach came as a singer in Catherine (1964), an episode of Telecast. He was cast in Loach's kitchen sink drama film Poor Cow (1967).

Selby often appeared in television advertisements, and portrayed Sam Maxstead for the first two runs of the ITV fantasy children's television series Ace of Wands from 1970 to 1971. Selby appeared as Peter Triman in the comedy drama film, Nobody Ordered Love, directed by Robert Hartford-Davis. The film was released on 5 November 1972 and focused on the events after film director Paul Medbury (John Ronane) attempts to replace Alice Allison (Ingrid Pitt), the alcoholic star of his new First World War movie entitled The Somme, with up-and-coming starlet Caroline Johnson (Judy Huxtable), a series of tragic events begins to unfold. According to the British Film Institute (BFI), which holds an annotated shooting script in its collection, Nobody Ordered Love is considered a lost film and is on its 75 Most Wanted list. Kevin Lyons of the BFI National Library Filmographic Unit writes: "Rank released Nobody Ordered Love in 1972 and it certainly played the New Victoria in London, regular home to low-budget exploitation fare. Star Ingrid Pitt has suggested – in an interview with the Celluloid Slammer blog as well as in one of her on-going series of columns for the Den of Geek website that Hartford-Davis had a falling out with Rank over the lack of promotion they were giving the film and stormed off with the prints, decamping to the States, where he continued to work. After his death, Pitt claims, his widow arranged for his belongings to be disposed of and the cans of film were among those items thrown out."

From 1975 to 1978, Selby portrayed Corporal Percy Marsh in the ITV sitcom Get Some In!. The series focused on National Service life in the Royal Air Force. The series was written by [John] Esmonde and [Bob] Larbey, with Selby in mind. Get Some In! regularly attracted 15 million viewers and was one of a number of shows from that decade to have never been repeated. He appeared on the ITV comedy game show Celebrity Squares in 1975, and then again the following year. He appeared on several other game shows, including; Give Us a Clue (1979, 1980), The Generation Game (1979), Blankety Blank (1980), and 3-2-1 (1982, 1986). In 1978, he appeared in an uncredited role as a Hood in the American superhero film Superman.

Selby made his radio debut, as the voice of Eddie on the BBC Radio 4 radio drama strand Saturday Night Theatre in 1981. He worked on several other radio plays.

He appeared on three episodes of the ITV, and later BBC One, biographical television documentary, This Is Your Life. The first episode, for John Thaw, was broadcast in 1981. The second episode, for Glen Murphy, was broadcast in 1992. The third episode, for Geoffrey Hughes, was broadcast in 2001. Selby subsequently portrayed Sabalom Glitz in the BBC science fiction television series Doctor Who from 1986 to 1987, with Colin Baker and Sylvester McCoy. He appeared in The Mysterious Planet, The Ultimate Foe and Dragonfire. He appeared as Max Taplow in the BBC One comedy-drama series Love Hurts. The series was created by Laurence Marks and Maurice Gran, and ran from 1992 to 1994.

Selby was a lyricist, and wrote songs with the jazz pianist Tony Lee. In 1995, Lee said "We've written one for Tony Bennett, but have yet to persuade him to record it,". He played Ben Rumson in the 1996 revival of the Broadway musical comedy, Paint Your Wagon, at Regent's Park Open Air Theatre. His role earned him a 1997 Laurence Olivier Award nomination for best supporting performance in a musical.

Selby portrayed Clive Mitchell, a member of the Mitchell family, in the BBC One soap opera EastEnders. He appeared in two episodes during early October 2002, and was credited as Uncle Clive. His character was mentioned a handful of times during the 1990s, and was briefly mentioned in 2003. He appeared as Danny Paye, an East End loan shark, in the BBC One police procedural comedy drama, New Tricks. The episode, "Meat Is Murder", was broadcast in 2009. He then portrayed Vic Bishop in the ITV crime drama mystery series Midsomer Murders. The episode, "The Silent Land", was broadcast in 2010.

Selby portrayed Arthur Harper, Susan Harper's long-lost father, in the BBC One sitcom My Family. The episode, "A Decent Proposal", was broadcast in 2011. Selby made his final film appearance, as Darryl, in the zombie action comedy, Cockneys vs Zombies. The film was released in 2012. He portrayed Gabriel Franks in the Sky One superhero crime drama series Stan Lee's Lucky Man. The episode, "Evil Eye", was broadcast in 2016, and marked his final appearance as an actor. Selby retired in March 2016, after his final television appearance, as himself in the documentary film, Versus: The Life and Films of Ken Loach.

== Personal life ==
Selby married his first wife, Jacqueline A "Jacqui" Milburn, an actress and dancer, in Westminster, Middlesex, on 30 October 1964, having been together since 1958. They had two children together; Samantha Selby (born 2 August 1966, at Westminster Hospital) and Matthew James "Matt" Selby (born October 1968). The couple separated in 1980. The former couple were granted a "quicky" divorce in the London Divorce Court on 1 July 1982, after 17 years of marriage.

Selby married his second wife, Georgina P "Gina" Sellers (née Bright), a public relations consultant, in Westminster, Greater London on 22 November 1986. The couple spent their honeymoon in Kenya. He had a stepson, Richard A Chalmers (born April 1962), from his wife's first marriage.

Selby was an avid football fan. He supported Queens Park Rangers and was close friends with the team's full-back, Terry Fenwick. He played for the showbiz charity football team, Television Entertainers' XI.

=== Death ===
Selby died in Bayswater on 5 September 2021, after contracting COVID-19. He was 83. His death was announced by Lizanne Crowther Management (LCM) Limited, his management, on 6 September 2021, in a statement on Twitter, reading: "With great sadness we announce that actor Tony Selby passed away peacefully in London yesterday. In a career spanning 70 years in theatre, film and TV, Tony was highly respected and loved by family, friends and colleagues. His renowned sense of humour will be missed by us all."

Tributes poured in from fans across the world, with Sylvester McCoy, his Doctor Who co-star, leading tributes on social media, writing: "Just heard the sad sad news that Tony Shelby has died. A popular member of the Doctor Who family. He was a warm, merry, generous person. And it was always a joy to meet him socially."

== Filmography ==
=== Theatre ===
| Year | Title | Role | Venue | Ref. |
|---|---|---|---|---|
| 1949 | Peter Pan | Curly | Scala Theatre | |
| 1963 | Alfie | Lacey | Mermaid Theatre, London and Duchess Theatre, London | |
| 1965 | Saved | Fred | Royal Court Theatre, London | |
| 1966 | A Chaste Maid in Cheapside | Touchwood Senior | Royal Court Theatre, London | |
| 1969 | Sometime Never | Christopher Budgett | Fortune Theatre, London | |
| 1977 | Get Some In! | Corporal Marsh | Princess Theatre, Torquay | |
| 1978 | Get Some In! | Corporal Marsh | Winter Gardens, Blackpool | |
| 1978 | Flashpoint | Carter | New End Theatre, London and May Fair Theatre, London | |
| 1979 | Don't Just Lie There, Say Something! | Inspector Ruff | Hoe Theatre, Plymouth, Devonshire Park Theatre, Eastbourne and other locations | |
| 1979–1980 | Tishoo | Cullen | Wyndham's Theatre, London and Richmond Theatre, London | |
| 1995–1996 | Mother Courage and Her Children | The Sergeant | National Theatre | |
| 1996 | Paint Your Wagon | Ben Rumson | Regent's Park Open Air Theatre | |

=== Film ===
| Year | Title | Role | Notes | Ref. |
|---|---|---|---|---|
| 1951 | Mencius Was a Bad Boy | Pig | Television film | |
| 1953 | Skippy Smith Goes to the Circus | Porky Williams | Television film | |
| 1955 | John and Julie | Youth Club boy | Uncredited | |
| 1955 | The Benedict Plan | Jan | Television film | |
| 1955 | An Alligator Named Daisy | Boy with Stick | Uncredited | |
| 1960 | Jazz Boat | Boat Ticket Collector | Uncredited | |
| 1960 | The Entertainer | Teddy Boy | Uncredited | |
| 1961 | The Queen's Guards | Kishu | | |
| 1965 | City Under the Sea | George | Uncredited | |
| 1965 | The Early Bird | Godfrey | Uncredited | |
| 1966 | Alfie | Lacey | Uncredited | |
| 1966 | Press for Time | Henry Marshall (reporter, 'County Chronicle') | | |
| 1967 | Poor Cow | Customer in Pub | | |
| 1968 | Witchfinder General | Salter | | |
| 1968 | The High Commissioner (also called Nobody Runs Forever) | Cameraman | Uncredited | |
| 1969 | Before Winter Comes | Ted | | |
| 1969 | In Search of Gregory | Taxi Driver | Uncredited | |
| 1970 | Carry On Loving | Wrestler | Uncredited | |
| 1971 | Villain | Duncan | | |
| 1972 | Nobody Ordered Love | Peter Triman | Lost film | |
| 1973 | Adolf Hitler: My Part in His Downfall | Bill | | |
| 1974 | Poor Billy Render | | Short film | |
| 1974 | Sing the Lady Out of Bed | | Television film | |
| 1978 | Superman | Hood | Uncredited | |
| 1981 | If You Go Down in the Woods Today | Boozy Barker | | |
| 1987 | The Secret Garden | Sergeant Bailey | Television film | |
| 1995 | Slave of Dreams | Etham | | |
| 1997 | Loop | Ted | | |
| 1998 | My Summer with Des | Barman | Television film | |
| 2000 | Happy Birthday Shakespeare | Roy | Television film | |
| 2012 | Cockneys vs Zombies | Darryl | | |

=== Television ===
| Year | Title | Role | Notes | Ref. |
|---|---|---|---|---|
| 1955 | The Explorer | Boy | Episode: "The Journey Begins" | |
| 1955 | Sunday Night Theatre | Harper | Episode: "The Adventurer" | |
| 1958 | Theatre Night | | Episode: "Living for Pleasure" | |
| 1960 | About Religion | Roman soldier | Episode: "The News on Good Friday" | |
| 1960 | An Age of Kings | | 3 episodes | |
| 1960 | Probation Officer | Second Policeman | Episode: "Episode #1.36" | |
| 1961, 1966–1967, 1974 | Play of the Week | Private Kemp, PC George Tapps, Fred, Crawford | 4 episodes | |
| 1962, 1964 | No Hiding Place | Police Constable, First player | 2 episodes | |
| 1964 | Teletale | Singer | Episode: "Catherine" | |
| 1964 | Compact | Removal Man | 2 episodes | |
| 1964 | Catch Hand | Lorry Driver | Episode: "Stop Counting at One" | |
| 1964 | The Indian Stories of Rudyard Kipling | Private Robinson | Episode: "Only a Subaltern" | |
| 1964 | Joan of Arc | Brother, Soldier | 2 episodes | |
| 1965–1967 | The Wednesday Play | Tim, Danny Lee, Dave, Harry, Maurice, Charlie Mills, Brother Malachy | 7 episodes | |
| 1966 | Thirty-Minute Theatre | Danny | Episode: "The Hard Word" | |
| 1966 | King of the River | Jag | Episode: "Keeping the Old Spirit Alive" | |
| 1967 | Theatre 625 | Albert Stokes | Episode: "A Night Out" | |
| 1967 | Half Hour Story | Ged | Episode: "The Gentleman Caller" | |
| 1967 | The Informer | Tony Cass | 4 episodes | |
| 1968 | The Avengers | Stanley | Episode: "The Curious Case of the Countless Clues" | |
| 1968, 1974 | Play of the Month | Henry Straker, Jasperino | 2 episodes | |
| 1968 | The Gamblers | Gabriel Warcup | Episode: "You've Got a Lucky Face" | |
| 1968 | The Inquisitors | | Episode: "The Peeling of Sweet P. Lawrence" | |
| 1969 | According to Dora | Various | Episode: "Episode #2.4" | |
| 1969 | Department S | Mallin | Episode: "The Man from 'X'" | |
| 1970 | Shine a Light | Jr. Lighthouseman Les Robinson | 6 episodes | |
| 1970 | Tom Grattan's War | Mr. Norris | 3 episodes | |
| 1970, 1973 | Comedy Playhouse | Bill, Ron Bates | 2 episodes | |
| 1970–1971 | Ace of Wands | Sam Maxstead | 26 episodes | |
| 1971 | Z-Cars | Roy Gannon | 2 episodes | |
| 1971 | Catweazle | Sergeant Jones | Episode: "The Walking Tree" | |
| 1971 | The Fenn Street Gang | Corporal Elliott | Episode: "The Thin Yellow Line" | |
| 1972 | Callan | Lucas | Episode: "None of Your Business" | |
| 1972 | Pathfinders | Commando Cpl. | Episode: "For Better, for Worse" | |
| 1972–1973 | Thirty Minutes Worth | | 2 episodes | |
| 1972 | The Adventures of Black Beauty | Moss | Episode: "Day of Reckoning" | |
| 1972 | Public Eye | Constable | Episode: "Horse and Carriage" | |
| 1973 | Special Branch | Ridley | Episode: "A Copper Called Craven" | |
| 1973–1974 | Crown Court | Tom Morgan, Bill Broad | 6 episodes | |
| 1973 | The Gordon Peters Show | | Episode: "The Candidate" | |
| 1973 | Warship | PO-Wtr. Willows | Episode: "Funny, They All Say That" | |
| 1973 | New Scotland Yard | PC Trent | Episode: "Property, Dogs & Women" | |
| 1973, 1975 | Centre Play | Flynn, Gee | 2 episodes | |
| 1973 | Black and Blue | Mavis | Episode: "Soap Opera in Stockwell" | |
| 1973 | Armchair Theatre | Sergeant | Episode: "The Square of Three" | |
| 1974 | Reg Varney | Various | Episode: "Episode #2.1" | |
| 1974 | ITV Sunday Night Theatre | Bob | Episode: "No Harm Done" | |
| 1974, 1976 | Bless This House | Fingers, Intruder | 2 episodes | |
| 1974 | Sutherland's Law | Charlie Hunter | Episode: "The Thirteenth Man" | |
| 1974 | Thriller | Mark | Episode: "I'm the Girl He Wants to Kill" | |
| 1974 | ABC's Wide World of Entertainment | Crawford | Episode: "The Break" | |
| 1974–1975 | Moody and Pegg | Sid | 5 episodes | |
| 1975 | No, Honestly | Inspector | Episode: "Surprise Surprise" | |
| 1975 | Cilla's Comedy Six | Jack Livesey | Episode: "Every Husband Has One" | |
| 1975 | The Sweeney | Johnny Lyon | Episode: "Queen's Pawn" | |
| 1975 | How's Your Father? | P.C. Plodmore | Episode: "The Laburnam Avenue Job" | |
| 1975–1976 | The Good Life | Sam | 2 episodes | |
| 1975 | Churchill's People | John Church | Episode: "The Agreement of the People" | |
| 1975 | Two's Company | Mr. Burton | Episode: "Dorothy's Electrician" | |
| 1975–1978 | Get Some In! | Corporal Percy Marsh | 34 episodes | |
| 1976 | The Basil Brush Show | | Episode: "Episode #11.10" | |
| 1977 | Festival 77 | Dave | | |
| 1978, 1981 | Play for Today | Stan, Frank Chapple | 2 episodes | |
| 1979–1980, 1989 | Minder | Muldoon, Jack | 3 episodes | |
| 1980–1981 | Kelly Monteith | Policeman | 2 episodes | |
| 1981 | Plays for Pleasure | Charlie | Episode: "The Reason of Things" | |
| 1981 | The Gentle Touch | Harry Warren | Episode: "Protection" | |
| 1982 | Father Charlie | Mr. Wainwright | Episode: "For What We Are About to Receive" | |
| 1983 | Jack of Diamonds | Norman Lugg | 6 episodes | |
| 1983 | Jury | Inspector | Episode: "Ann" | |
| 1983–1984 | Give Us a Break | Benny | 2 episodes | |
| 1984 | Cockles | Bunter, Singer | Episode: "Mermaids", title song singer | |
| 1984 | Bergerac | Paul | Episode: "The Company You Keep" | |
| 1984 | Lady Is a Tramp | Land Owner | Episode: "Episode #2.6" | |
| 1985 | Screen Two | Mitchell | Episode: "In the Secret State" | |
| 1986 | Duty Free | Charlie | Episode: "Costa Del Crime" | |
| 1986 | Hideaway | Terry Staples | 6 episode | |
| 1986–1987 | Doctor Who | Sabalom Glitz | 9 episodes | |
| 1986 | The Theban Plays by Sophocles | Soldier | Episode: "Antigone" | |
| 1986 | The Kenny Everett Television Show | Various | Episode: "Episode #4.4" | |
| 1987 | C.A.T.S. Eyes | Jethro Blackstock | Episode: "Twelve Bar Blues" | |
| 1987, 1995, 2005 | Casualty | Leon, Dan Kavanagh, Bert Hazeldene | 3 episodes | |
| 1987 | You Must Be the Husband | George | Episode: "Big George Is Back" | |
| 1989 | The Nineteenth Hole | Brooks | Episode: "Episode #1.2" | |
| 1989 | Hard Cases | Charlie | Episode: "Episode #2.2" | |
| 1990 | The Paradise Club | Jack Deverell | Episode: "Faces from the Past" | |
| 1991 | Lovejoy | Sgt. Hartley | Episode: "Raise the Hispanic" | |
| 1992–1994 | Love Hurts | Max Taplow | 30 episodes | |
| 1992–1993 | Mulberry | Bert, Performer | 13 episodes | |
| 1994 | Law and Disorder | George Stagg | Episode: "Safe as Houses" | |
| 1994–1997 | The Detectives | Sgt. 'Nozzer' Richardson, Nozzer | 6 episodes | |
| 1995 | The Queen's Nose | Bicycle Shop Manager | Episode: "Episode #1.3" | |
| 1995 | The World of Lee Evans | Father | Episode: "The Late Shift/Meet the Folks" | |
| 1997, 2001, 2004 | The Bill | Vinnie Rogers, Norman Klein, Barry Jackson | 4 episodes | |
| 1998–1999 | Real Women | Bobby | 4 episodes | |
| 1998 | Renford Rejects | Old Dog Captain | Episode: "Old Dogs" | |
| 1998 | The Vanishing Man | Danny | Episode: "Nothing Up My Sleeve" | |
| 1999 | Holby City | Jim Horton | Episode: "Puppy Love" | |
| 1999 | Real Women II | Bobby | | |
| 2000 | Mike and Angelo | Blackbeard | Episode: "Shipmates" | |
| 2000 | Hero to Zero | George | 2 episodes | |
| 2000 | Harbour Lights | Ron Nicholls | Episode: "Rites of Passage" | |
| 2000 | Burnside | Jim Summers | 4 episodes | |
| 2001, 2016 | Doctors | Harry 'Jack' Clement, Terry Wallace | 2 episodes | |
| 2002 | EastEnders | Clive Mitchell | 2 episodes | |
| 2003 | Is Harry on the Boat? | George | Episode: "Cherry Intacto" | |
| 2005 | Rose and Maloney | Ben Roche | Episode: "Alan Richmond" | |
| 2006–2007 | Dream Team | Terry Harrison | 7 episodes | |
| 2009 | New Tricks | Danny Paye | Episode: "Meat Is Murder" | |
| 2010 | Midsomer Murders | Vic Bishop | Episode: "The Silent Land" | |
| 2011 | My Family | Arthur | Episode: "A Decent Proposal" | |
| 2016 | Stan Lee's Lucky Man | Gabriel Franks | Episode: "Evil Eye" | |

=== As himself ===
| Year | Title | Notes | Ref. |
|---|---|---|---|
| 1975–1976 | Celebrity Squares | 2 episodes | |
| 1976 | Whodunnit? | Episode: "A Deadly Tan" | |
| 1977 | Seaside Special | Episode: "Episode #3.11" | |
| 1979–1980 | Give Us a Clue | 2 episodes | |
| 1979 | The Generation Game | Episode: "Episode #9.6" | |
| 1980 | Star Games | 2 episodes | |
| 1980 | Blankety Blank | Episode: "Episode #3.14" | |
| 1981, 1992, 2001 | This Is Your Life | 3 episodes | |
| 1982, 1986 | 3-2-1 | 2 episodes | |
| 1986 | Speaking to the City – Sophocles then and Now. | | |
| 2008 | The Making of the Trial of a Time Lord: Part One – Mysterious Plant | | |
| 2008 | The Making of the Trail of a Time Lord: Part Four – The Ultimate Foe | | |
| 2012 | Friends Like Who | | |
| 2016 | Versus: The Life and Films of Ken Loach | | |

=== Radio ===
| Year | Title | Role | Station | Notes | Ref. |
|---|---|---|---|---|---|
| 1981 | Saturday-Night Theatre | Eddie | BBC Radio 4 | Episode: "The Essential Act" | |
| 1994 | Thirty Minute Theatre | Hector | BBC Radio 4 | Episode: "Dead Man's Button" | |
| 1998 | The Cruel Sea | Tallow | BBC Radio 2 | 2 episodes | |
| 2000 | The Ghost of Thomas Kempe | Bert | BBC Radio 4 | 1 episode | |
| 2004, 2006 | Afternoon Play: A Long Time Dead | Geoff | BBC Radio 4 | 2 episodes | |

== Legacy ==
Selby is featured on the "In Memory Of" section of the official British Academy of Film and Television Arts (BAFTA) website. He was remembered during the "In Memoriam" section of the 2022 British Academy Television Awards ceremony, which was held at the Royal Festival Hall in London, on 8 May.

Selby is the subject of the biography, Tony Selby: Pimlico Boy (ISBN 9781780916477), written by Alan Rowlands. The book was published by JMD Media on 1 September 2024.
