= Anthony May =

British actor (1946–2021)

- Born: 23 May 1946; Reigate, Surrey, England
- Died: 24 December 2021 (aged 75)
- Occupation: Actor
- Spouses: Charlotte Panton (m. 1983, divorced) Vanessa Pett (m. 1992)

Anthony May (23 May 1946 – 24 December 2021) was an English stage, television and film actor. He trained at R.A.D.A. from 1965 to 1967.

== Early life ==
May was born in Reigate, Surrey. He played Wick in David Halliwell's Little Malcolm at the Royal Court Theatre for the National Youth Theatre. Then Zigger in Zigger Zagger, which transferred to the Strand Theatre, for which he was nominated for a Variety Award for most promising newcomer.

== Career ==
In his first full-length film, he played the Young Poet in Karel Reisz's Isadora (1968). Roles in TV, including The Tenant of Wildfell Hall for the BBC and the Wednesday play No Trams to Lime Street (musical version), followed. Then a film in Czechoslovakia, Michael Kohlhaas - Der Rebell (1969), with David Warner and Anna Karina, directed by the Oscar-winning director Volker Schlöndorff.

He starred opposite Judy Huxtable in the 1968 cult short film Les Bicyclettes de Belsize, directed by Douglas Hickox. The Soldier in Brendan Behan's The Hostage, directed by Richard Eyre, was followed by a tour of the Far East playing Prince Hal in Henry IV, parts 1 and 2. He appeared as Richard Cromwell in Cromwell (1970) with Richard Harris and Alec Guinness, as Pirie in Cornel Wilde's No Blade of Grass (1970), and had a guest star role in the children's hit series, Here Come the Double Deckers. He was a director of Senta Productions who produced the 1972 film The Triple Echo, which starred Glenda Jackson and Oliver Reed, directed by Michael Apted. He also appeared in British comedy films such as The Sex Thief (1973) and Three for All (1975).

Playing Sloane in Joe Orton's Entertaining Mr Sloane at the Kings Head Theatre preceded tours with the London Shakespeare Group's Macbeth of Iraq, Bangladesh, South Korea, Japan and Africa, where they played to Maasai warriors in the foothills of Mt Kilimanjaro. He played Macduff at Frank Dunlop's Young Vic Theatre, where a long association over the years developed. This production was toured around Mexico, finishing at the Guanahato Festival. Other plays at the Young Vic included King Lear, The Real Inspector Hound, A Man for all Seasons, Richard II, Gloo Joo and Caesar in Anthony and Cleopatra. At the Bristol Old Vic he played Leonidik in Arbuzov's The Promise, and another production of Macbeth, this time playing Banquo, directed by Richard Cottrell. A film of Chekov's Zinotchka. An Australian film They Ran Before the Wind, filmed in the South Seas, in which Anthony played Fletcher Christian in a story of what happened after the mutiny on the Bounty. He then played Bobby in American Buffalo at the National Theatre, directed by Bill Bryden, and starred in an American drama documentary about Jack the Ripper. Anthony was also in the Jack the Ripper film Murder by Decree (1979) with James Mason and Christopher Plummer. He played Hamlet at the Northcott Theatre. Other roles there included Captain Plume in The Recruiting Officer and Sir Thomas Overbury in a new play Favours. Anthony also worked with Mike Hodges on the Tom Stoppard written film Squaring the Circle in 1984.

There have been many TV appearances, including Z-Cars, Casualty, Juliet Bravo, Dickens of London, The Bill, London's Burning, Anna Lee, The Paradise Club, El Cid, Bulman, Between the Lines, Softly, Softly, Rockliffe's Babies, Minder, All Quiet on the Preston Front, Chandler and Co, Boon, Coronation Street, The Dream Team, The Hutton Enquiry, The Ice House and Messiah, working with directors Adrian Shergold, Anthony Minghella, Martin Campbell, Stephen Poliakoff and Tim Fywell. Other stage plays include Richard II, Gloo Joo, Withdrawal Symptoms, A Chorus of Disapproval, Marino Faliero, Rosencrantz and Guildenstern are Dead, The Launderette, A Last Belch for the Great Auk and The Nuns, which he also directed at the Roundhouse.

May was the voice of the King of the Dead in The Lord of the Rings: The Return of the King. In 2011 he voiced Bootstrap Bill in the Pirates of the Caribbean video game, Gustav Bird in The Adventures of Tintin: The Secret of the Unicorn tie-in game, and Dickson in the original Xenoblade Chronicles. One of his last appearances was at the Queen Elizabeth Hall reading the poetry of Rumi. He also appeared as a nobleman in the 2014 fantasy film Maleficent starring Angelina Jolie.

A sought-after voice artist, May produced and appeared in one-off poetry and music events. In 2013, under the name Traceless, May and musician Ceri Evans released two spoken-word albums—Rumi in Love and Divani Nurbakhsh—featuring the poetry of 13th-century Sufi mystic Rumi.

== Personal life and death ==
May married actress Vanessa Pett in 1992 and they had two children together, Harry and Lily. He also had two other children, Jack and Jessica, from a previous marriage to Charlotte Panton. He died on 24 December 2021, at the age of 75.

== Filmography ==
- Isadora (1968) – Young Poet
- Les Bicyclettes de Belsize (1968) – The Boy (lead role)
- Michael Kohlhaas – Der Rebell (1969) – Peter
- The Wednesday Play: "No Trams to Lime Street" (1970) - Billy Mack
- Cromwell (1970) – Richard Cromwell
- The Breaking of Bumbo (1970) – Art Student
- No Blade of Grass (1970) – Andrew Pirrie
- The Triple Echo (1972) – Subaltern
- The Sex Thief (1973) – Barman
- Three for All (1975) – Martin
- Les Misérables (1978) – Gendarme
- Murder by Decree (1979) – Lanier
- McVicar (1980) – Billy
- Sky Bandits (1986) – Guard No.2
- Hidden City (1987) – Burned Man
- The Lord of the Rings: The Return of the King (2003) - The King of the Dead (voice only, uncredited); additional voices
- Star Wars: Knights of the Old Republic II (2004) - Serroco Leader (voice)
- Xenoblade Chronicles (2010) – Dickson (voice)
- The Adventures of Tintin: The Secret of the Unicorn (2011) - Gustav Bird (voice)
- Maleficent (2014) – Nobleman
- The Witcher 3: Wild Hunt (2015) - Imlerith, General of the Wild Hunt (voice)
