= A War of Children =

- Genre: Drama
- Written by: James Costigan
- Directed by: George Schaefer
- Starring: Vivien Merchant; Jenny Agutter; John Ronane
- Composer: Jerry Fielding
- Countries of origin: United States; United Kingdom
- Original language: English

Production
- Executive producer: Abby Mann
- Producer: George Schaefer
- Cinematography: Christopher Challis
- Editors: Eric Boyd-Perkins; Anne V. Coates; Christopher Holmes; Fabien D. Tordjmann
- Running time: 73 minutes
- Production company: Tomorrow Entertainment

Original release
- Network: CBS
- Release: December 5, 1972

A War of Children is a 1972 television film directed by George Schaefer, written by James Costigan, and starring Vivien Merchant, Jenny Agutter, and John Ronane.

== Premise ==
During The Troubles in Northern Ireland, two middle-class families in Belfast, one Catholic and one Protestant, turn from friends to bitter enemies. Their children face the painful consequences.

== Cast ==
- Vivien Merchant as Nora Tomelty
- Jenny Agutter as Maureen Tomelty
- John Ronane as Frank Tomelty
- Danny Figgis as Donal Tomelty
- Anthony Andrews as Reg Hogg
- Aideen O'Kelly as Meg McCullum
- David G. Meredith as Robbie McCullum
- Oliver Maguire as Ian McCullum
- Patrick Dawson as Seamus Lynch

== Awards ==
The film won the Primetime Emmy Award for Outstanding Single Program - Drama or Comedy and was nominated for Outstanding Directorial Achievement in Drama - A Single Program. It was also nominated for the Golden Globe Award for Best Television Film.
