= The Touchables =

1968 British film by Robert Freeman

- Theatrical release poster
- Directed by: Robert Freeman
- Screenplay by: Ian La Frenais; Original Screenplay: David Cammell; Donald Cammell
- Story by: Robert Freeman
- Produced by: John Bryan
- Starring: Judy Huxtable; Esther Anderson; Marilyn Rickard; Kathy Simmonds; David Anthony; James Villiers; John Ronane
- Cinematography: Alan Pudney
- Edited by: Richard Bryan
- Music by: Ken Thorne
- Distributed by: Twentieth Century Fox
- Release date: 20 November 1968; (US)
- Running time: 97 minutes
- Country: United Kingdom
- Language: English

The Touchables (also known as Love Generation) is a 1968 British crime drama film directed by Robert Freeman and starring Judy Huxtable, Esther Anderson and James Villiers. It was written by Ian La Frenais from a story by Donald Cammell. Cammell, who shares screenplay credit, would later rework its themes in Performance (1970).

== Plot ==
In Swinging London, four girls decide to kidnap their pop idol and hold him hostage in a giant plastic dome in the countryside. His manager tries desperately to find him, as does a wrestler and an upper-class London gangster. However, it becomes clear that the young man does not want to be freed from his glamorous captors.

== Cast ==
- Judy Huxtable as Sadie
- Esther Anderson as Melanie
- Marilyn Rickard as Busbee
- Kathy Simmonds as Samson
- David Anthony as Christian
- James Villiers as Twyning
- John Ronane as Kasher
- Ricki Starr as Ricki
- Harry Baird as Lillywhite
- Michael Chow as Denzil
- Joan Bakewell as herself
- Peter Gordeno as Jimmy
- Simon Williams as Nigel

== Production ==
It was the first of only two films directed by Freeman, the photographer responsible for a number of Beatles album covers. A mannequin of Diana Dors which appears in the film was the same model as was used in the cover montage of Sgt. Pepper's Lonely Hearts Club Band.

== Releases ==
Largely ignored on its release and since, owing to the scarcity of prints, it has recently acquired cult status of its type, in part due to a DVD release.

== Reception ==
=== Box Office ===
According to Fox records, the film required $2,600,000 in rentals to break even and by 11 December 1970 had made $825,000 so made a loss to the studio.

=== Critical ===
The Monthly Film Bulletin wrote:

"Just a temporary solution to the leisure problem, our flavour of the month", is how one of The Touchables characterises the abduction of the pop singer they have whisked off to their polythene pleasure dome. A remark that aptly sums up the spirit of the piece – a world of disposable daydreams, a mise en scéne that drips with the highly lacquered kinkiness of a glossy advertising lay-out. The difficulty is that the film would often like to dig deeper than its consistently bright surface, but once it gets down to celebrating a kind of liberation of the senses, all the crass, "inflatable" fantasy is unable to make these cavortings seem any more or less real, beautiful or liberated than what has gone before. In fact, the content and method of The Touchables is little different from Robert Freeman's shorter film fantasy The World of Fashion. Here, however, the colour supplement imagination has extended itself into a feature length film, shakily bolstered by Ian La Frenais' script and drawing what little energy it has from the energetic performances of its quartet of kidnappers. Otherwise, for all the artful combinations of colour and op, pop and non-art bric-a-brac, entertainment in this form will hardly provide even a temporary solution to anyone's leisure problem.

Kine Weekly called the film: "An electrifying exposé of contemporary London."

Boxoffice wrote: "The incredibly obtuse plot is augmented by the nervous cameras of director Robert Freeman. Self-indulgent to an extreme, he nonetheless manages some stunning editing and photography, greatly assisted by the spectacular bodyworks of his stars, Judy Huxtable, Esther Anderson, Marilyn Rickard and Kathy Simmonds. The Touchables should really find its niche in that never-never land of female adolescent fancies. Plenty of nudity in De Luxe Color and all the English gear and slang will probably make this John Bryan production a winner."

Renata Adler, writing in The New York Times, described the film as "A sort of fidgety mod pornography, which uses the advertising convention for eroticism – cutting abruptly from teasing sex scenes to gadgetry, in this case pinball machines, trampolines and odd items of furniture and clothing. Robert Freeman, who directs (his first feature film) is a former fashion photographer ... There is no question of acting, since the range of expressions runs from seductive to sinister to mod vacuous."

Variety wrote: "The Touchables is an expensively vulgar exercise in forced comedies. British-made "swinging" pic never gets off dead center, John Bryan's highly visual production trappings do not rescue a middling script mix of sex, sadism, kidnapping and doubtful humor, shot down by dull direction and acting. ... Film's concept never is clear. If meant as a put-down of a current cinema cycle, it is a puerile effort; if eyed as a psychological study, it is immature; if conceived as escapism, it is entirely inadequate and forced."

The Independent Film Journal wrote: "This British film can't decide whether it's a farce, a satire, a melodrama, a fable, a romantic comedy, an erotic fantasy, or a walk around the park, and it ends up as simply a commercial for itself. Plenty of exploitable items on the surface, all of them aimed at the youth market."

In Offbeat: British Cinema's Curiosities, Obscurities and Forgotten Gems, Gary Ramsay wrote: "It is difficult not to feel a tinge of delight watching the girls cavort around their sex dome, playing psychedelic table tennis in their mini-skirts, but ultimately, without the sepia-coating of nostalgia, The Touchables is a period piece that is both delightful and incoherent in equal measures".
