= Loop (1997 film) =

- Directed by: Allan Niblo
- Written by: Tim Pears
- Produced by: Tedi De Toledo; Michael Riley
- Starring: Andy Serkis; Susannah York; Tony Selby
- Cinematography: Nigel C. Goudge
- Edited by: Patrick Moore; Folasade Oyeleye
- Music by: David Bradnum
- Production companies: Sterling Pictures; Talkback Productions
- Distributed by: Artsmagic
- Release date: 1997
- Running time: 93 minutes
- Country: United Kingdom
- Language: English
- Budget: £900,000

Loop is a 1997 British romantic comedy feature film produced by Tedi De Toledo and Michael Riley. It was written by Tim Pears and is the debut film of director Allan Niblo.

The writer of Loop, Tim Pears, also wrote the novel for In a Land of Plenty which was turned into an acclaimed 10-part TV drama serial for the BBC and produced by the London-based production company Sterling Pictures and Talkback Productions.

== Plot ==
In Loop, the main character, Rachel, is dumped by her boyfriend and exacts revenge. This film is classified as a romantic comedy.

== Cast ==
- Andy Serkis as Bill
- Susannah York as Olivia
- Tony Selby as Tom
- Moya Brady as Waitress
- Willie Ross as Geordie Trucker
- Heather Craney ... Cashier
- Howard Lee ... Bank Clerk
- Paul Ryan ... City Barman
- Emer McCourt as Rachel
- Jayne Ashbourne as Hannah
- Gideon Turner as Jason
- Alisa Bosschaert as Sarah
- Paul Daly a Jack
- Evelyn Doggart as Jean
- Emer McCourt as Rachel
- Maya Saxton as Jenny
- Gideon Turneras Jason

== Reception ==
Contemporary British and Irish Film Directors: a Wallflower Critical Guide, panned the film, calling it a formulaic romantic comedy that was "obviously" filmed on a very small budget. The review makes note of problems with cinematography, sound, script, and direction, summarizing "Loop reminds you that good films are increasingly hard to make, and with countless projects languishing in development or distribution hell, it is difficult to see how this ever made it to the production line."
