= Shine a Light (TV series) =

1970 British TV comedy series

Shine a Light is a British television thatwhich aired in 1970. Starring Timothy Bateson, Tony Selby and Howell Evans, it was produced by Yorkshire Television. All six episodes are believed to be lost.
