= Les Bicyclettes de Belsize =

1968 British musical short film directed by Douglas Hickox

- Opening titles
- Directed by: Douglas Hickox
- Screenplay by: Michael Newling
- Story by: Bernie Cooper; Francis Megahy
- Produced by: Jacques de Lane Lea
- Starring: Judy Huxtable; Anthony May
- Cinematography: Wolfgang Suschitzky
- Edited by: Norman Wanstall
- Music by: Les Reed; Barry Mason
- Production companies: Delmore Film Productions; Illustra Films
- Distributed by: British Lion Film Corporation
- Release date: 1968
- Running time: 29 minutes
- Country: United Kingdom
- Language: English

Les Bicyclettes de Belsize is a 1968 British musical 29-minute short film directed by Douglas Hickox and starring Judy Huxtable and Anthony May. It was a supporting feature to Roy Boulting's horror film Twisted Nerve (1968). The two films also shared a soundtrack release, with each score occupying one side each of a 1969 Polydor Records album (Polydor 583 728).

It tells the story of a young man cycling around the Hampstead (NW3) area of London on a Raleigh RSW16. After crashing into a billboard, he falls in love with a fashion model depicted on it. Despite the title, the Belsize Park area does not actually feature.

There is almost no spoken dialogue, and the soundtrack to the film is heard virtually throughout. The title song of the film, written by Les Reed and Barry Mason, has been a hit for Mireille Mathieu and Engelbert Humperdinck (a top ten hit in the UK and a top 40 hit in the USA) amongst others, though the version in the film is sung by Johnny Worth (aka songwriter Les Vandyke). The score also includes "Gentlemen Of The Park", performed by Episode Six and featuring future Deep Purple members Ian Gillan and Roger Glover.

The title is derivative of the French film Les Parapluies de Cherbourg (1964); apart from a musical theme, there is no other obvious link.

== Plot ==
The film opens from a vantage point over the rooftops, showing some of the morning occurrences through the windows of the houses. An unnamed young man dressed in a fashionable mod style prepares for the day from his rooftop flat and cycles around to the theme song. He then takes his bicycle and descends to the streets of the leafy suburbs. Cycling down some steps he crashes into the bike of a little girl and is knocked unconscious. She stands over him showing her pigtails, glasses and braces and gazes at him, clearly besotted. The man awakes and asks the girl's name. She tells him she is called Kate. He bids her farewell and cycles off, she follows behind. As he cycles the man sings a song about how he does not envy the responsible, monotonous lives of older people. The girl blows a raspberry as she passes a queue of people at the bus stop; this starts a disagreement between the people at the stop which ends with a food fight.

Cycling into a park, the man looks back to see if Kate is still following him, and loses control of the bike, running away down a hill and crashing through a large advertising hoarding. Climbing out, he is struck by the face of a model, "Julie" on the poster advertising Raleigh bicycles. He sings a song professing his love for her and picks flowers to give to her image. Kate tries to attract his attention but he is transfixed by the beautiful model. He eventually rouses himself from his stupor and cycles away. Kate blows a raspberry at the poster then follows him.

The man arrives at his workplace, a printer's, opens the post which has arrived, and finds one parcel is a photographic portrait of Julie. He sits gazing at it, while the camera pans across the street. By coincidence, Julie is at a fashionable party in the building there. She sings a song about how pampered and cloistered her world is, and how she wants to find a true love. She walks out of the building, crosses the street and looks at the photo of her which has now been hung in the printer's window. The man is gazing at it still, and recognises her. She smiles at him uncertainly at first, but then with more self-assurance, and they kiss through the glass.

Before the man can go outside and meet Julie, she is whisked away in a limousine to a fashion shoot where she poses in various 'groovy' outfits on Parliament Hill and Hampstead Heath, looking unhappy and distracted and wondering where the man she just met is. He cycles through the park looking for her and when he finds her sings his love song again. They walk off hand in hand. The little girl watches them from the hill and looks sad. Then a little boy cycles up, sees her, smiles and expresses his attraction for her and makes her smile. They cycle off together.

== Critical reception ==
The Monthly Film Bulletin wrote: "The bicycles of Belsize Park prove a poor substitute for the umbrellas of Cherbourg in this mawkish attempt to create a musical mood piece that emerges as an over-sell commercial for N.W.3. Soft focus, psychedelic filters and a tirelessly swinging camera can of course contrive to make any neighbourhood look like a poet's dream of Montmartre, but one soon wearies of the sight of the hero mouthing the lyrics of some unmemorable and over-orchestrated songs as he busily pedals along, while the attempt to create a slapstick sequence with a member of the tricycle set and a few custard pies is possibly even more embarrassing than the scene in which Steve gathers plastic daffodils amid the autumn leaves of Primrose Hill."

Leslie Halliwell said: "Mildly attractive whimsy, obviously patterned on Les Parapluies de Cherbourg but not quite hitting the spot."
