= No Trams to Lime Street =

1959 British television play

No Trams to Lime Street is a 1959 British television play, written by the Welsh playwright Alun Owen for the Armchair Theatre anthology series. Produced by ABC Weekend TV for transmission on the ITV network, the play was broadcast on 18 October 1959. The original version no longer exists.

Set in the northern English city of Liverpool, where Owen had grown up from the age of eight, the play starred Alfred Lynch, Billie Whitelaw, Jack Hedley and Tom Bell. It was directed and produced by two Canadians—Ted Kotcheff and Sydney Newman respectively. Newman was at the time the Head of Drama at ABC. The storyline concerns three sailors on shore leave in Liverpool. The play was a factor in Owen later being hired to write the script for The Beatles' first feature film, A Hard Day's Night (1964), as they had been impressed with his depiction of their home city in the production. For his work on that film, Owen was nominated for an Academy Award in 1965.

In 1965, No Trams to Lime Street was remade by the BBC, as part of their Theatre 625 anthology strand, screened on the new BBC2 channel. It was presented as the middle episode in a trilogy of loosely connected Owen plays, broadcast on 21 March 1965, being preceded by Progress to the Park on 14 March and followed by A Little Winter Love on 28 March. The second version, which starred Mike Pratt, Tom Bell and Anthony Hall, is also lost.

The play was remade for television a second time, again by the BBC, in 1970, for the Wednesday Play strand. Transmitted on 18 March 1970, this time on BBC1 this version was directed by Piers Haggard starred Rosemary Nicols, Glyn Owen, Anthony May, Eilian Wyn and Paul Greenwood; and included songs and music by Marty Wilde and Ronnie Scott (not the famous jazz saxophonist and club owner). This version survives as a black and white telerecording, although it was made in colour.
