= Nobody Ordered Love =

1972 British film by Robert Hartford-Davis

- Still from the film
- Directed by: Robert Hartford-Davis
- Written by: Robert Shearer
- Produced by: Robert Hartford-Davis
- Starring: Ingrid Pitt; Judy Huxtable; John Ronane; Tony Selby
- Edited by: Alan Pattillo
- Music by: Tony Osborne
- Production companies: World Arts Media Group, R.H.D., Daylight
- Release date: 5 November 1972
- Running time: 87 minutes
- Country: United Kingdom
- Language: English

Nobody Ordered Love is a lost 1972 British tragicomic drama film directed by Robert Hartford-Davis and starring Ingrid Pitt, Judy Huxtable, John Ronane, and Tony Selby. It was written by Robert Shearer.

The movie was the last lead in a feature for Ingrid Pitt.

== Plot ==
After film director Paul Medbury attempts to replace Alice Allison, the alcoholic star of his new First World War movie entitled The Somme, with up-and-coming starlet Caroline Johnson, a series of tragic events begins to unfold.

== Cast ==
- Ingrid Pitt as Alice Allison
- Judy Huxtable as Caroline Johnson
- John Ronane as Paul Medbury
- Tony Selby as Peter Triman
- Peter Arne as Leo Richardstone
- Mark Eden as Charles
- David Weston as Jacques Legrand
- John Glyn-Jones as Harry
- Janet Lynn as Valerie
- David Lodge as Sergeant
- Frank Jarvis as Corporal
- Barry Meteyard as Lieutenant
- Larry Taylor as camera operator
- Heather Barbour as Janet
- Tricia Barnes as continuity girl
- Charles Houston as assistant
- Carolyn Wilde as Virginia

== Preservation status ==
According to the British Film Institute (BFI), which holds an annotated shooting script in its collection, Nobody Ordered Love is considered a lost film and is on its 75 Most Wanted list. Kevin Lyons of the BFI National Library Filmographic Unit writes:

Rank released Nobody Ordered Love in 1972 and it certainly played the New Victoria in London, regular home to low-budget exploitation fare. Star Ingrid Pitt has suggested – in an interview with the Celluloid Slammer blog as well as in one of her on-going series of columns for the Den of Geek website that Hartford-Davis had a falling out with Rank over the lack of promotion they were giving the film and stormed off with the prints, decamping to the States, where he continued to work. After his death, Pitt claims, his widow arranged for his belongings to be disposed of and the cans of film were among those items thrown out.

Ingrid Pitt wrote "When I was first offered the job I was told it was the modern version of Shakespeare’s Romeo and Juliet."

== Reception ==
In The Monthly Film Bulletin David McGillivray wrote: "In attempting to point up the ruthless chicanery and corruption of the film industry (something Hollywood has proved an undisputed master at exposing), Nobody Ordered Love goes completely off the rails. What seals its fate is the total lack of contrast between film and film-within-film. The dialogue seems to be equally abysmal in both, it becomes impossible to detect which actors are supposed to be bad and which aren't, and whether it is Paul Medbury striving for realism or Robert Hartford-Davis parodying himself (in Corruption) as the shot of Ingrid Pitt's stomach being ripped open with a bayonet is repeated again and again. ... A few observations, no doubt culled from the writer or director's own experience, manage to be ludicrously accurate (the nude audition, the supporting player who considers himself God's gift to female extras) but the majority, bluntly over-stated, are simply ludicrous."

== See also ==
- List of lost films
