= Douglas Hickox =

British film director (1929–1988)

- Born: Douglas Arthur Hickox; 10 January 1929; London, England
- Died: 25 July 1988 (aged 59); London, England
- Occupations: Film director, television director
- Years active: 1950–1988
- Known for: Theatre of Blood; Brannigan; Zulu Dawn; The Hound of the Baskervilles
- Spouse: Anne V. Coates (m. 1958, divorced)

Douglas Arthur Hickox (10 January 1929 – 25 July 1988) was an English film and television director.

In 1998, the British Independent Film Awards created the Douglas Hickox Award, also named The Douglas Hickox Award (Best Debut Director), in his honor, as an annual award to recognize the best British debut director.

== Biography ==
Hickox was born in London, where he was educated at Emanuel School. He started in the film industry at age 17, working at Pinewood Studios as "a thirty bob a week office boy".

Hickox worked extensively as an assistant director and second unit director throughout the 1950s and early 1960s. The British 'B' Film, by Steve Chibnall and Brian McFarlane (British Film Institute, 2009), credits him with working on over thirty musical shorts and a handful of jazz/pop supporting featurettes. He worked on TV shows such as Sunday Break and Tempo and became a leading director of TV commercials. In 1966 he won several awards for his advertisements at the Venice International Advertising Film Congress.

He made his first major picture, Entertaining Mr Sloane, in 1970 at the age of 41. He joined forces with the producer who had the rights and raised the finance. Hickox was meant to follow it with A Mouthful of Gold with Nicol Williamson and The Italian Girl by Iris Murdoch, but neither was made.

"I think of myself as an interpretive director," he said in 1970. "I'm a narrative director, basically. An audience should become totally involved in the film, the actors and the story. They shouldn't be aware of the director at all or of how things are done."

Over the next ten years, he developed a reputation for the wit and style of his direction, and for his taut action sequences. His work includes Les Bicyclettes de Belsize (1968), Entertaining Mr Sloane (1970), Sitting Target (1972), Theatre of Blood (1973), Brannigan (1975), Sky Riders (1976) and Zulu Dawn (1979). He worked on various TV movies and mini-series in the 1980s until his death. He died in a London hospital following a heart surgery operation at age 59.

== Family ==
Hickox was married three times. His first wife was Josephine Elizabeth Popovic (née May). In 1958 he married Anne V. Coates, the Oscar-winning editor of Lawrence of Arabia. After his death, his third wife Annabel approached the Raindance Film Festival with an annual bequest from Douglas' estate. This bequest led directly to the creation of the British Independent Film Awards. In recognition of Douglas's commitment and support for new talent, BIFA inaugurated the Douglas Hickox Award, which is given to a British director on their debut feature.

Douglas had two sons, Anthony Hickox (1959–2023) and James D. R. Hickox (b. 1965), both also directors; and two daughters, one with Coates, Emma Hickox (b. 1964), who is a successful film editor, and one with Annabel, Diana. Anthony Hickox is known for Hellraiser III: Hell on Earth (1992), whilst he was executive producer on Children of the Corn III: Urban Harvest (1995), directed by his brother James. Emma Hickox's resume includes The Brylcreem Boys, Kinky Boots, The Jacket, The Boat That Rocked, Blue Crush, Rock of Ages and A Walk to Remember.

Douglas Hickox was buried in Putney Vale Cemetery, London.

== Filmography ==
=== As director ===
- Four Hits and a Mister (1962) (Short)
- It's All Over Town (1964)
- Just for You (1964) (re cut in US as Disk-O-Tek Holiday)
- Les Bicyclettes de Belsize (1968) (Short)
- Entertaining Mr Sloane (1970)
- Sitting Target (1972)
- Theatre of Blood (1973)
- Brannigan (1975)
- Sky Riders (1976)
- The Philips Time Machine (1977) (documentary)
- Zulu Dawn (1979)
- The Phoenix (1982) (TV series) - 3 episodes
- The Hound of the Baskervilles (1983) (TV movie)
- The Master of Ballantrae (1984) (TV movie)
- Mistral's Daughter (1984) (Miniseries) - 2 episodes
- Blackout (1985) (TV movie)
- Sins (1986) (Miniseries) - 3 episodes
- I'll Take Manhattan (1987) (Miniseries) - 2 episodes
- Dirty Dozen: The Series (1988) (TV series) - 5 episodes

=== As assistant/second unit director ===
- Prelude to Fame (1950) - 3rd AD
- Raiders in the Sky (1953) aka Appointment in London - 3rd AD
- Both Sides of the Law (1953) aka Street Corner -3rd AD
- Murder at 3am (1953) - 2nd AD
- Black 13 (1953) - 2nd AD
- The Master Plan (1954) - assistant director
- Time Is My Enemy (1954) - assistant director
- Adventure in the Hopfields (1954) - assistant director
- Shadow of Fear (1955) aka Before I Wake - assistant director
- Shadow of a Man (1955) - 1st AD
- The Secret (1955) - assistant director
- They Can't Hang Me (1955) - assistant director
- ITV Play of the Week - "The Salt Land" (1955) - assistant director
- ITV Play of the Week - "A Month in the Country" (1955) - assistant director
- Theatre Royal (1955) (TV series) - assistant director, 2 episodes
- It's a Great Day (1955) - assistant director
- The Secret Tent (1956) - assistant director
- Strangers' Meeting (1957) - assistant director
- The Spaniard's Curse (1958) - assistant director
- The Haunted Strangler (1958) - assistant director
- Fiend Without a Face (1958) - assistant director
- Missiles from Hell (1958) aka Battle of the V1 - assistant director
- Mingaloo (1958) (short) - assistant director
- The Invisible Man (1959) (TV series) - 2nd unit director, 13 episodes
- The House in Marsh Road (1960) aka Invisible Creature - 1st AD
- The Snake Woman (1961) - assistant director
- Double Bunk (1961) - assistant director
- Murder She Said (1961) - assistant director
