= John Ronane =

British actor (1933–2019)

- in Granada TV play Green Rub (1963)
- Born: 11 December 1933; Kensington, England
- Died: 15 May 2019 (aged 85); Eureka, Illinois, United States
- Occupation: Actor

John Ronane (11 December 1933 – 15 May 2019) was a British actor.

He appeared on stage in the West End, in films made in Hollywood and in Europe, and on television and radio. As a member of the Royal Shakespeare Company, he appeared in the original production of Harold Pinter's The Collection at the Aldwych Theatre in 1962.

Ronane's films include King Rat (1965), Charlie Bubbles (1967), Some May Live (1967), Sebastian (1968), Nobody Ordered Love (1972), and the 1975 remake of The Spiral Staircase.

On television Ronane had starring roles in the 1960s in ATV's Drama 61-67, and in "The Hooded Terror", "The Taxi's For Johnny," and "Two Love Stories." He appeared in the miniseries The Six Wives of Henry VIII and Elizabeth R as Thomas Seymour. He starred in the Emmy-nominated A War of Children for CBS. He was a regular character in Granada TV's series Strangers between 1978 and 1982, playing Detective Sergeant Singer. Ronane's other TV credits include: Z-Cars, Dixon of Dock Green, The Saint, The Avengers, Two in Clover, Strange Report, The Persuaders!, Out of the Unknown, Crossroads, Survivors, starred in 'Trust Red' in The Sweeney, 1990, All Creatures Great and Small, Only When I Laugh, Juliet Bravo, Howards' Way and Press Gang.

He appeared as a memorable villain in Soup of the Day the final episode of the acclaimed spy-fi series Department S (1969).

He also appeared on stage at the Apollo Theatre, Peoria, Illinois, as Marc in Art.

Ronane taught drama and acting at the University of Illinois at Urbana–Champaign and Illinois Central College.

He wrote, directed and starred in the play Words and Pictures, and wrote two novels: Hank Goes Dancing, about National Service in Britain in the 1950s, and Gone for a Soldier, a thriller. He also wrote several screenplays.

His memoir Rubber-Soled Shoes was published in 2017 by Versa Press.

He was married to Carole, and he had four children.

== Filmography ==
Year	Title	Role	Notes
1961	Doctor Blood's Coffin	Hanson	Uncredited
1961	Mary Had a Little...	Intern #1	Uncredited
1962	A Kind of Loving	Draughtsman	
1963	The Silent Playground	Alan	
1964	Rattle of a Simple Man	Willie	
1965	Operation Crossbow	RAF Dakota Pilot	Uncredited
1965	King Rat	Hawkins	
1967	Some May Live	Captain Elliott Thomas	
1967	How I Won the War	Operator	
1967	Another's Wife	Andrés	
1968	Sebastian	Jameson	
1968	Charlie Bubbles	Gerry	
1968	The Touchables	Kasher	
1972	Nobody Ordered Love	Paul Medbury	
1972	That's Your Funeral	Roland Smallbody	
1975	The Spiral Staircase	Doctor Rawley	
2015	College Debts	Professor McLaughlin	
