= List of Doctor Who characters =

The official logo used for the series from 2022 onwards

The long-running British science fiction television series Doctor Who has featured a large number of characters throughout its history. The show stars its protagonist, the Doctor, an alien who travels in time and space in a time machine known as the TARDIS. When the Doctor dies, they can regenerate, which allows them to survive death, though changes their appearance and personality in the process. The Doctor often travels alongside a number of travelling companions, who often act as major supporting characters and co-protagonists on their travels. The Doctor and their companions often encounter a number of antagonists, as well as a number of villainous alien races and creatures, who they must often stop from achieving villainous agendas.

The series began with William Hartnell's First Doctor in 1963's An Unearthly Child, accompanied by companions Susan Foreman (Carole Ann Ford), Barbara Wright (Jacqueline Hill) and Ian Chesterton (William Russell), with the series' very first alien antagonists, the Daleks, who debuted in the subsequent serial, The Daleks (1963-64). Since then, the show has featured a revolving cast, with the Doctor regenerating into new forms and with new companions, antagonists, and characters being introduced throughout the show's run.

== The Doctor ==
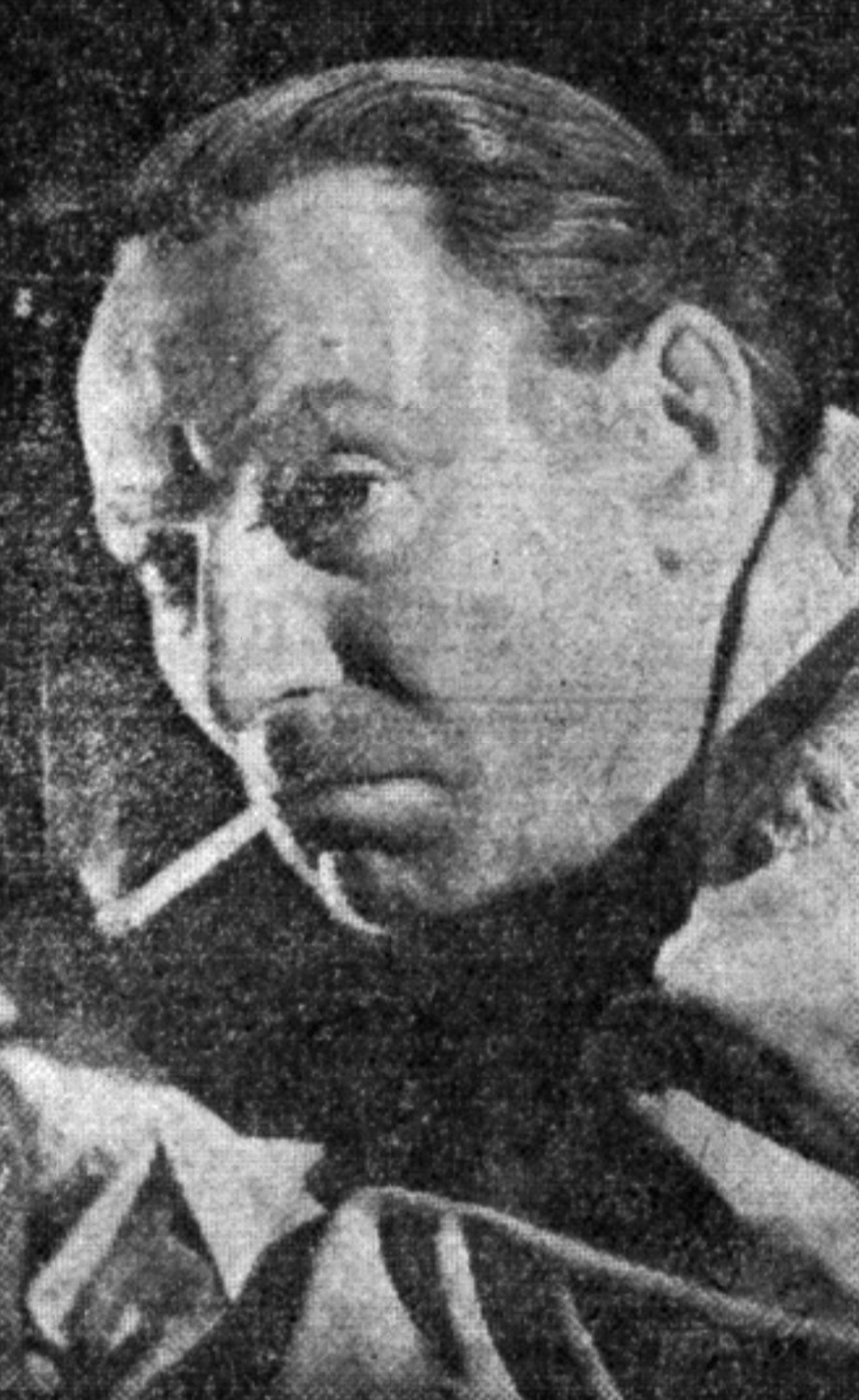
William Hartnell

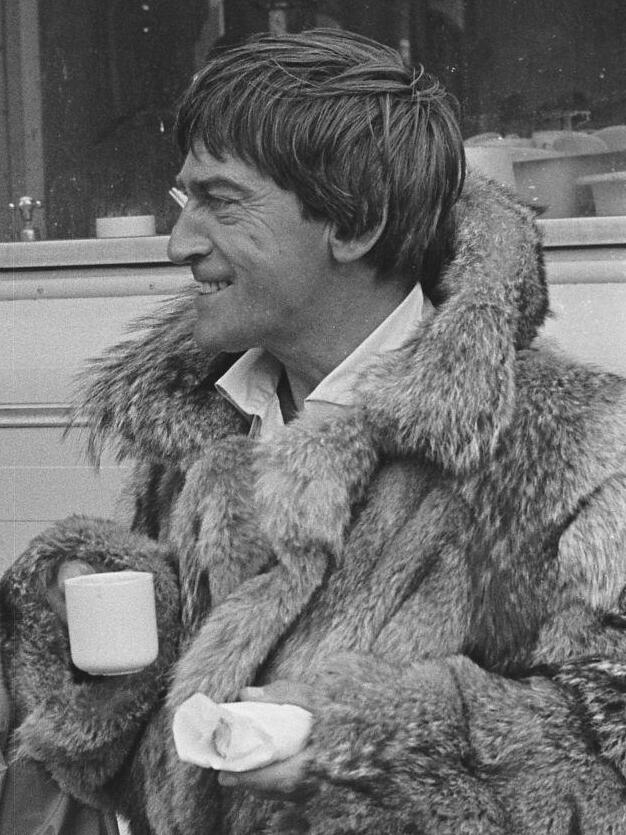
Patrick Troughton

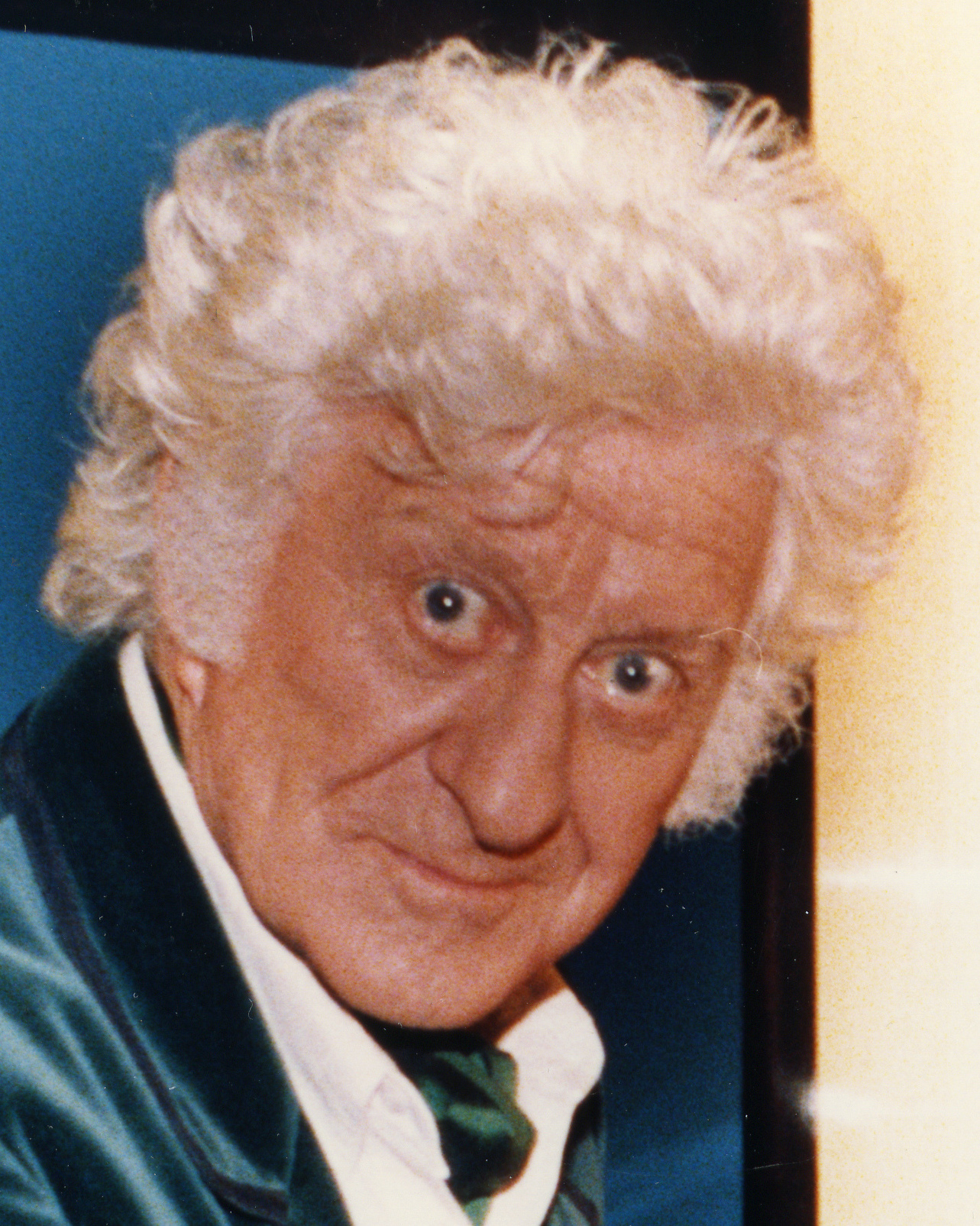
Jon Pertwee

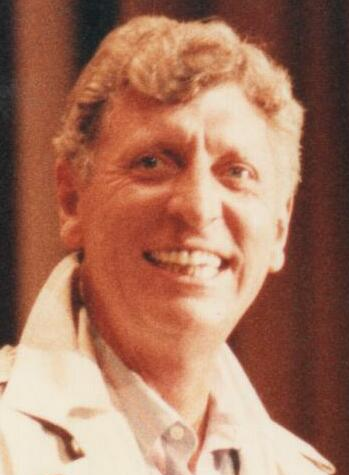
Tom Baker

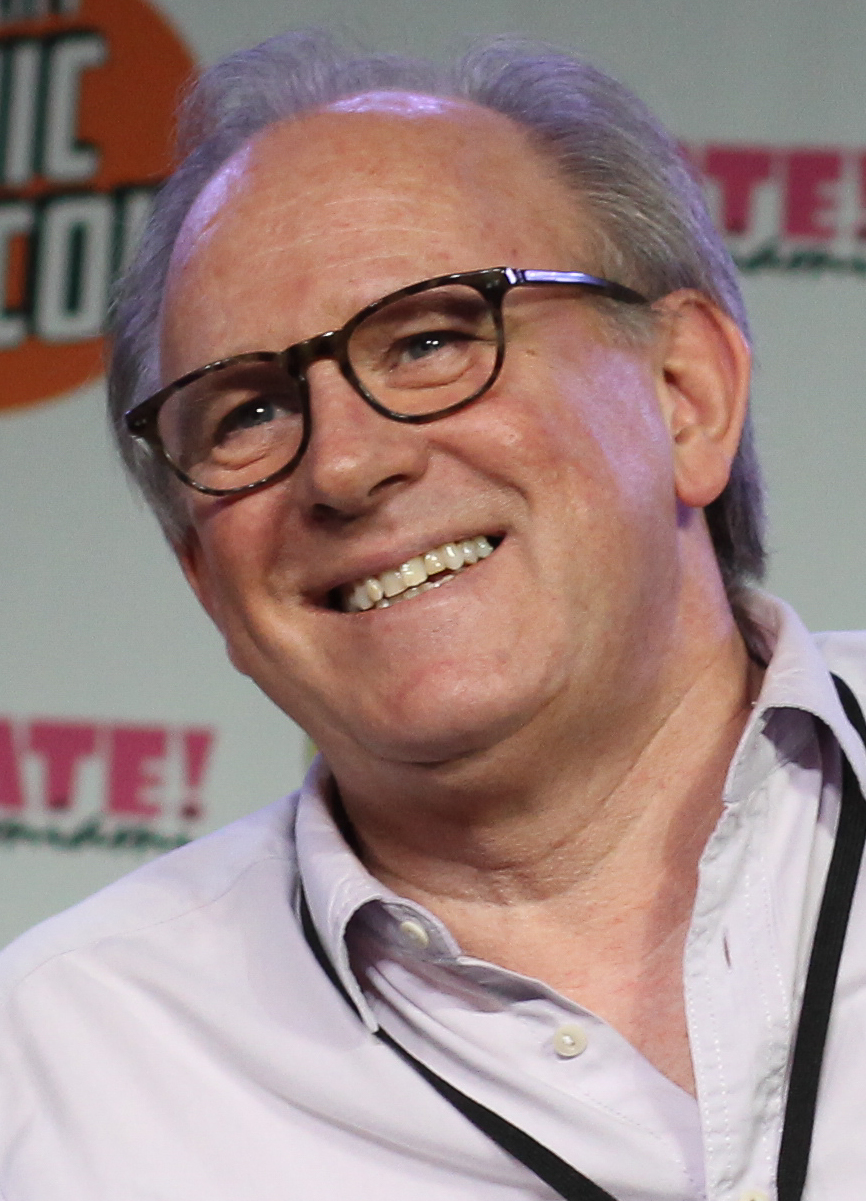
Peter Davison

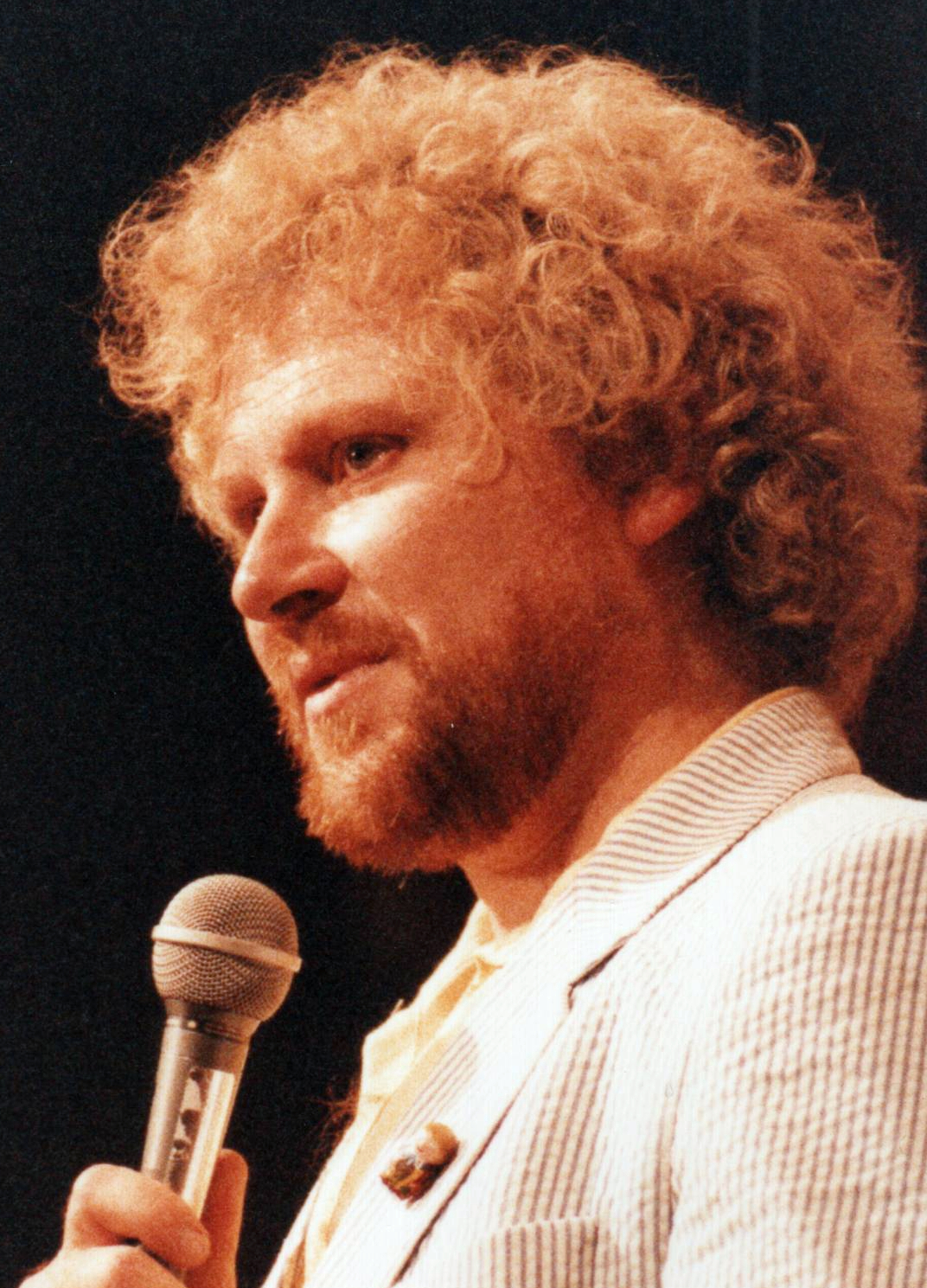
Colin Baker

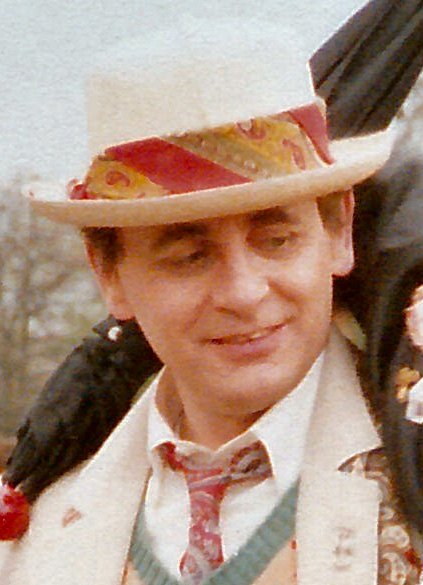
Sylvester McCoy

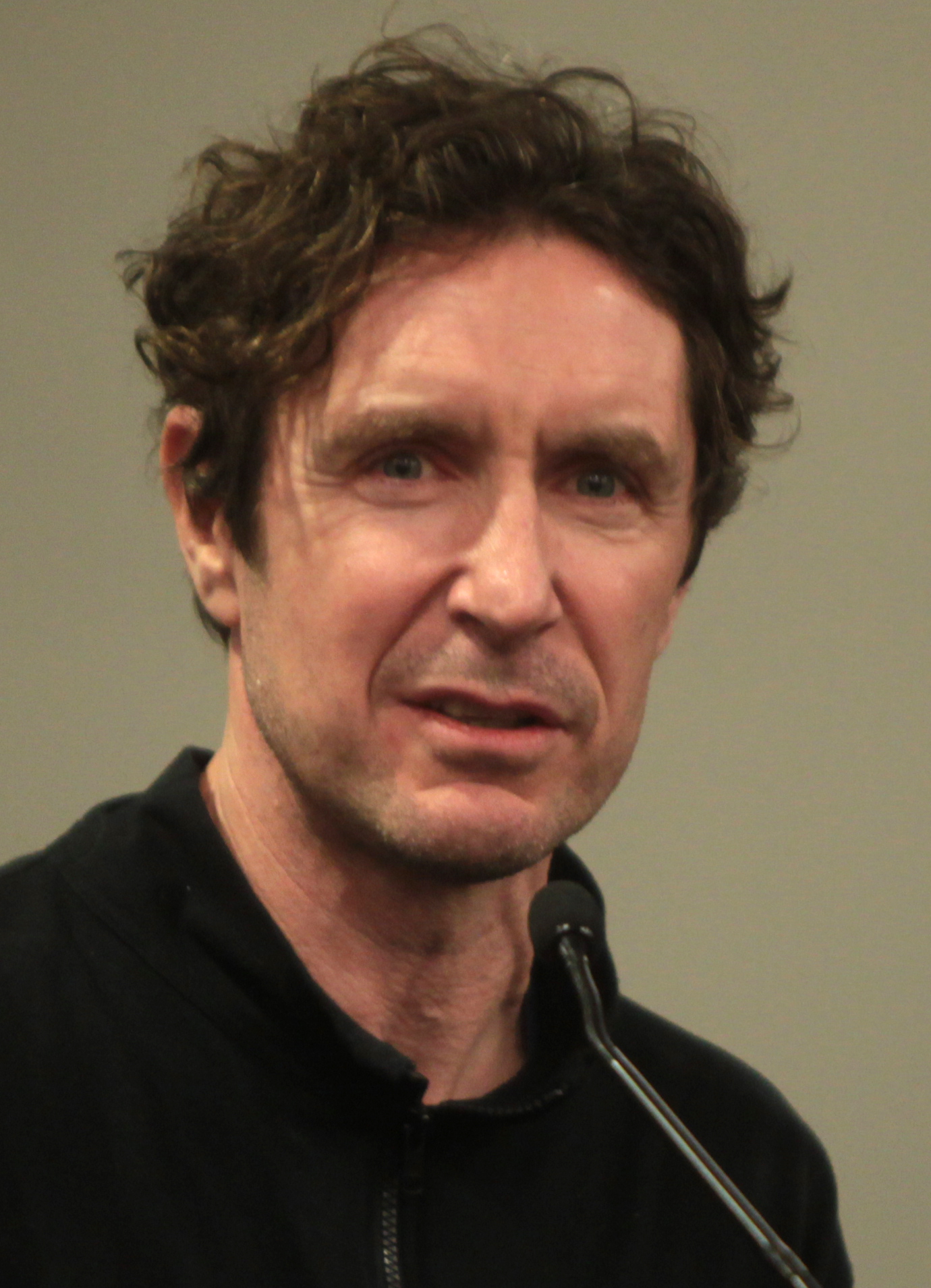
Paul McGann

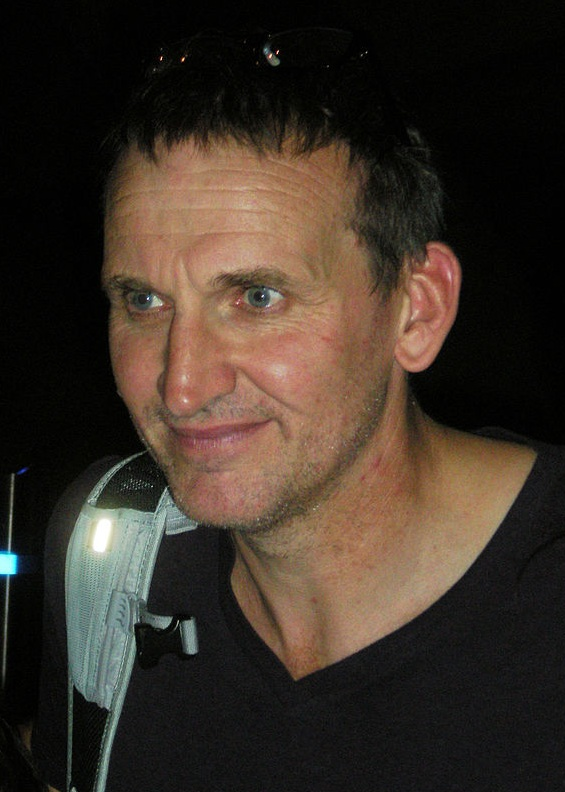
Christopher Eccleston

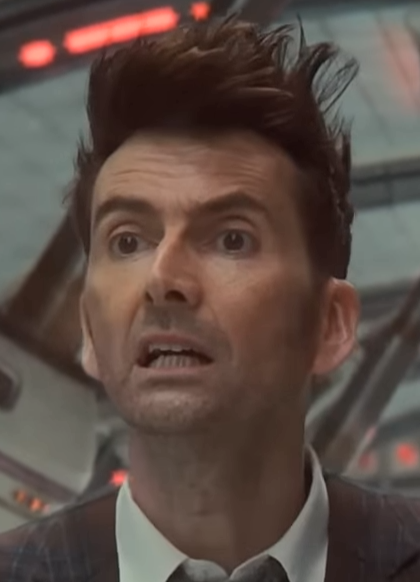
David Tennant

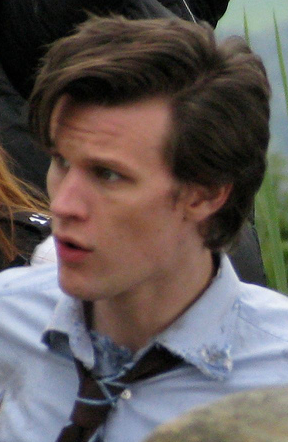
Matt Smith

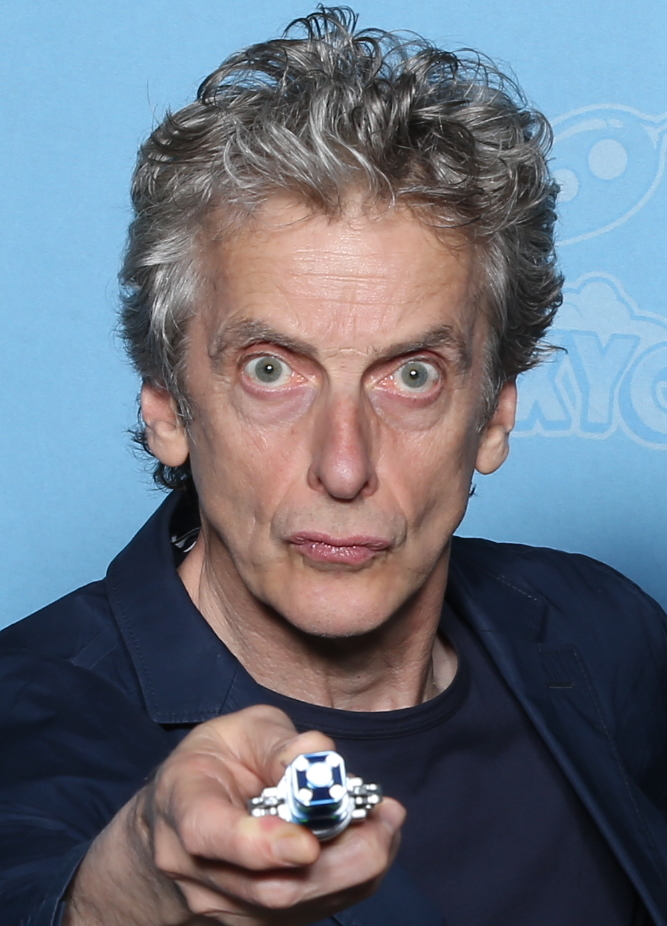
Peter Capaldi

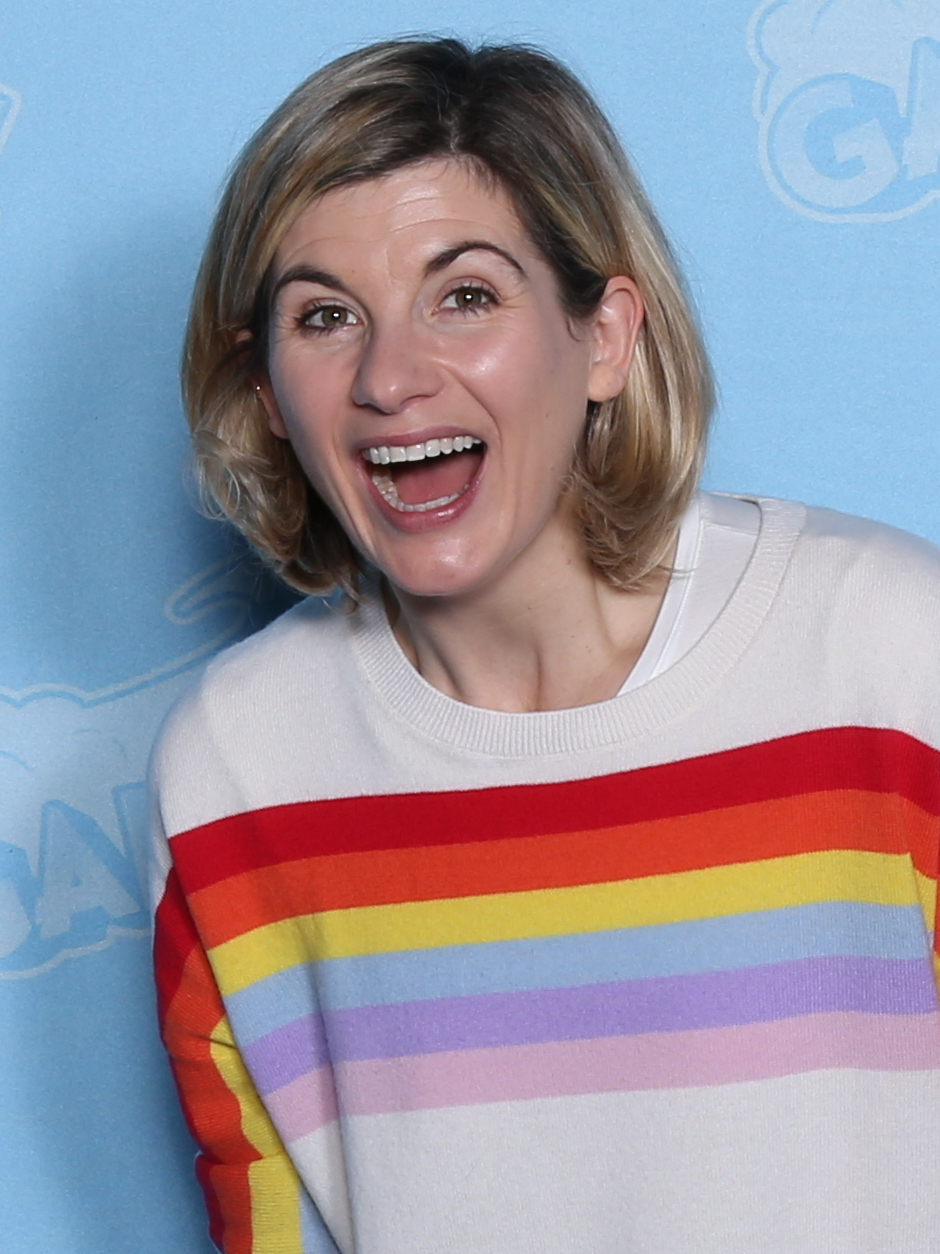
Jodie Whittaker

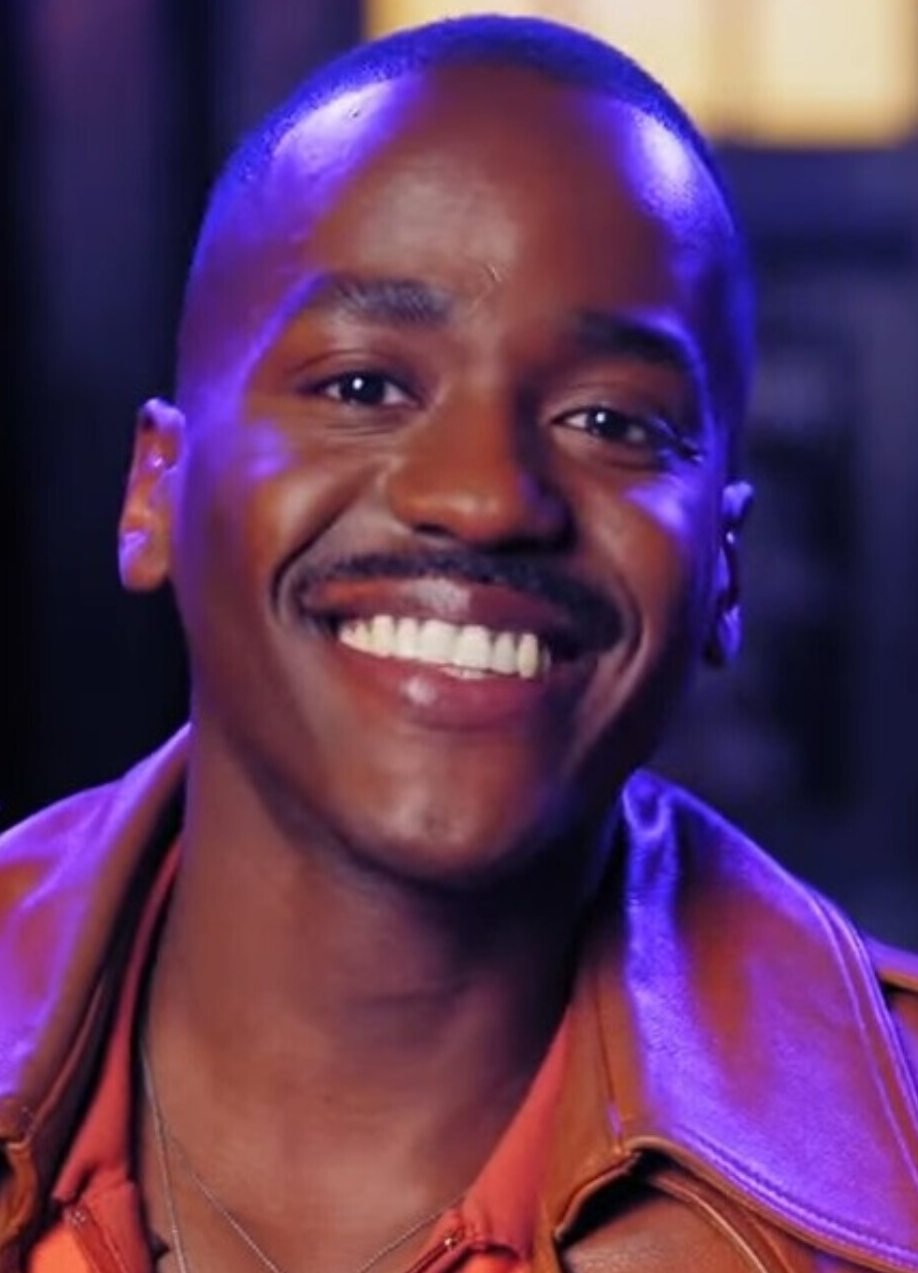
Ncuti Gatwa

Fourteen actors have portrayed the Doctor in a leading role in Doctor Who.

The Doctor is the main character of Doctor Who, a long-running British science fiction television series. The Doctor travels in time and space in their time machine known as the TARDIS, frequently alongside a variety of travelling companions. The Doctor is a member of an alien race known as the Time Lords, and when the Doctor dies, a feature of their Time Lord biology, regeneration, allows the Doctor to survive, albeit with a new face, appearance, and personality.

=== Main incarnations ===
Main incarnations
| Incarnation | Characteristics | Main appearances | | Primary actor |
| Incarnation | Characteristics | First | Last | Primary actor |
|---|---|---|---|---|
| First Doctor | Depicted as an old man, he is characterised as an "elderly curmudgeon" with moments of empathy, as well as a deep care for his granddaughter, Susan Foreman. The First Doctor eventually dies of old age while fighting the Cybermen, resulting in his regeneration into the Second Doctor. | An Unearthly Child (1963) | The Tenth Planet (1966) | William Hartnell |
| Second Doctor | Described as a "cosmic hobo" by viewers, the Second Doctor hides his vast intellect behind a more comedic exterior. The Second Doctor is characterised as a defender of the innocent, and eventually dies after his people, the Time Lords, exile him to Earth and force him to regenerate. | The Power of the Daleks (1966) | The War Games (1969) | Patrick Troughton |
| Third Doctor | The Third Doctor is depicted as a suave, authoritative, and moralistic figure, being a James Bond-esque character with a penchant for gadgets and vehicles. Predominantly exiled to Earth during his run, he frequently works alongside military organisation UNIT, acting as their scientific advisor, while also dueling his rival, an antagonistic Time Lord named the Master. The Third Doctor later regenerates after being exposed to a lethal dose of radiation. | Spearhead from Space (1970) | Planet of the Spiders (1974) | Jon Pertwee |
| Fourth Doctor | The Fourth Doctor is a free spirit, and is very eccentric in nature, often feigning being a fool to catch those around him off-guard. He is well known for wearing a distinctive long scarf. The Fourth Doctor was the longest-serving incarnation of the character, and thus is widely considered to be the most iconic of the Doctor's incarnations. The Fourth Doctor regenerates after falling off a radio telescope while fighting the Master. | Robot (1974) | Logopolis (1981) | Tom Baker |
| Fifth Doctor | The Fifth Doctor is characterised as having a youthful energy, and is depicted as often being more emotionally vulnerable as a result. The Fifth Doctor regenerates after dying from a poison. | Castrovalva (1982) | The Caves of Androzani (1984) | Peter Davison |
| Sixth Doctor | A heroic and caring incarnation, the Sixth Doctor is nonetheless characterised as having low patience and actively fighting with his companion, Peri Brown, as well as being highly egotistical. The Sixth Doctor regenerates after hitting his head. | The Twin Dilemma (1984) | The Ultimate Foe (1986) | Colin Baker |
| Seventh Doctor | At first depicted as a buffoonish figure, the Seventh Doctor's character evolves as he is depicted as a cunning and ruthless master manipulator throughout his adventures. After walking into a gunfight in San Francisco, he is killed during the subsequent surgery operation intended to save his life. | Time and the Rani (1987) | Survival (1989) | Sylvester McCoy |
| Eighth Doctor | A soft-spoken character who feels deeply about the world, he is depicted as a "romantic", with his incarnation being the first to engage in romance. The Eighth Doctor regenerates after crash-landing on the alien planet Karn. | Doctor Who (1996) | "The Night of the Doctor" (2013) | Paul McGann |
| Ninth Doctor | The Ninth Doctor is depicted as suffering from trauma after fighting in a devastating interstellar conflict known as the Time War, but finds purpose in his life after befriending his companion, Rose Tyler. He regenerates after absorbing the time vortex to save Rose's life. | "Rose" (2005) | "The Parting of the Ways" (2005) | Christopher Eccleston |
| Tenth Doctor | The Tenth Doctor is characterised as youthful, with an eccentric character. He is also depicted as engaging in a romantic relationship with Rose. He regenerates after taking a lethal amount of radiation to save the life of his companion, Wilfred Mott. | "The Christmas Invasion" (2005) | "The End of Time" (2009–2010) | David Tennant |
| Eleventh Doctor | Described as an "old man trapped in a young man's body," according to showrunner Steven Moffat, the Eleventh Doctor is highly energetic, often having a penchant for different accessories such as fezzes or bow ties. The Eleventh Doctor regenerates after dying of old age. | "The Eleventh Hour" (2010) | "The Time of the Doctor" (2013) | Matt Smith |
| Twelfth Doctor | Being visibly older than several of his prior incarnations, he is depicted as being much more "alien" and volatile, but slowly learns to regain a "human" way of acting due to his companions Clara Oswald and Bill Potts. The Twelfth Doctor regenerates while fighting the Cybermen. | "Deep Breath" (2014) | "Twice Upon a Time" (2017) | Peter Capaldi |
| Thirteenth Doctor | The first of the Doctor's female incarnations, the Thirteenth Doctor is depicted as being emotionally closed off, hiding her grief from the Master's destruction of their home planet, Gallifrey, behind an energetic exterior. The Thirteenth Doctor develops romantic feelings for her companion Yasmin Khan, though this is cut short by her death by a laser beam while fighting the Master. | "The Woman Who Fell to Earth" (2018) | "The Power of the Doctor" (2022) | Jodie Whittaker |
| Fourteenth Doctor | Physically resembling the Tenth Doctor in appearance, the Fourteenth Doctor has a similar characterisation, though the Fourteenth Doctor has differences in his character due to the character growth experienced between the two incarnations. The Fourteenth Doctor, unlike prior incarnations, does not regenerate when he dies, but instead bi-generates, splitting into two individuals (himself and the Fifteenth Doctor). After defeating the villainous Toymaker, the Fourteenth Doctor retires alongside his companion Donna Noble and her family while the Fifteenth Doctor continues exploring the universe. | "The Star Beast" (2023) | "The Giggle" (2023) | David Tennant |
| Fifteenth Doctor | Following the battle against the Toymaker, the Fifteenth Doctor continues to explore the universe. He is characterised as being joyful and a flirt, engaging in a relationship with the character Rogue, while also fighting against a recurring Pantheon of Gods. The Fifteenth Doctor dies fighting the Time Lords the Rani and Omega, after which he regenerates into a form resembling that of Rose Tyler. | "The Giggle" (2023) | "The Reality War" (2025) | Ncuti Gatwa |

=== Other incarnations ===
Other incarnations
| Incarnation | Characteristics | Main appearances | | Primary actor |
| Incarnation | Characteristics | First | Last | Primary actor |
|---|---|---|---|---|
| Dr. Who | The incarnation of the Doctor featured in a pair of spin-off films released in the 1960s. Unlike the Doctor's usual depiction, Dr. Who is presented as a kind human who invented the TARDIS by himself. This incarnation, and the films he appears in, are not traditionally considered part of the main Doctor Who continuity. | Dr. Who and the Daleks (1965) | Daleks' Invasion Earth 2150 A.D. (1966) | Peter Cushing |
| War Doctor | An incarnation of the Doctor who fought in a conflict known as the Time War. Retroactively introduced in the series' narrative, the War Doctor is placed between the Eighth and Ninth Doctors. | "The Name of the Doctor" (2013) | "The Day of the Doctor" (2013) | John Hurt |
| Fugitive Doctor | A mysterious incarnation with an unclear placement in the Doctor's timeline. She is depicted as having a "darker" characterisation, and is willing to use weapons if necessary. | "Fugitive of the Judoon" (2020) | "The Story & the Engine" (2025) | Jo Martin |

== Companions ==
Companions are those who travel with the Doctor in their adventures through time and space. Companions act as major supporting characters and co-protagonists, and are oftentimes human in comparison to the alien Doctor. Below are a number of the Doctor's companions from throughout the show's history.

- Susan Foreman
- Ian Chesterton
- Barbara Wright
- Vicki
- Steven Taylor
- Dodo Chaplet
- Ben and Polly
- Jamie McCrimmon
- Victoria Waterfield
- Brigadier Lethbridge-Stewart
- Zoe Heriot
- Liz Shaw
- Jo Grant
- Sarah Jane Smith
- Harry Sullivan
- Leela
- K9
- Romana
- Adric
- Nyssa
- Tegan Jovanka
- Vislor Turlough
- Peri Brown
- Mel Bush
- Ace
- Bernice Summerfield
- Rose Tyler
- Adam Mitchell
- Jack Harkness
- Mickey Smith
- Donna Noble
- Martha Jones
- Wilfred Mott
- Amy Pond
- Rory Williams
- River Song
- Clara Oswald
- Nardole
- Bill Potts
- Graham O'Brien
- Ryan Sinclair
- Yasmin Khan
- Ruby Sunday
- Belinda Chandra
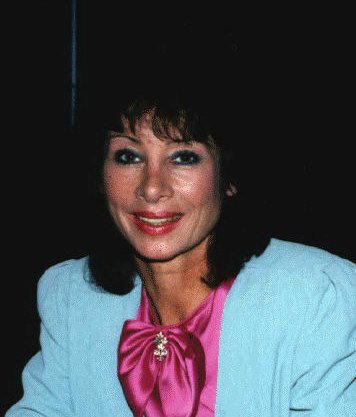
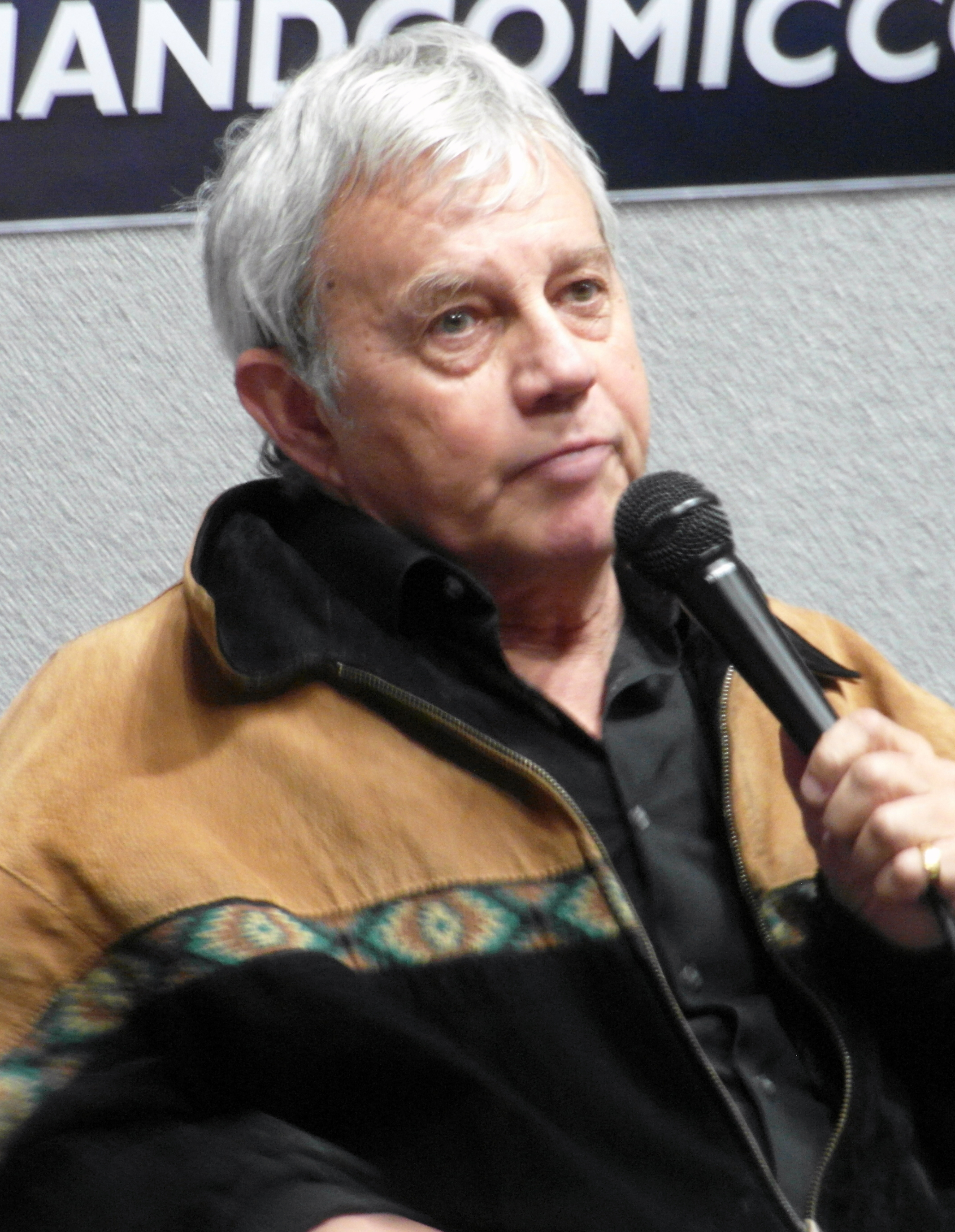
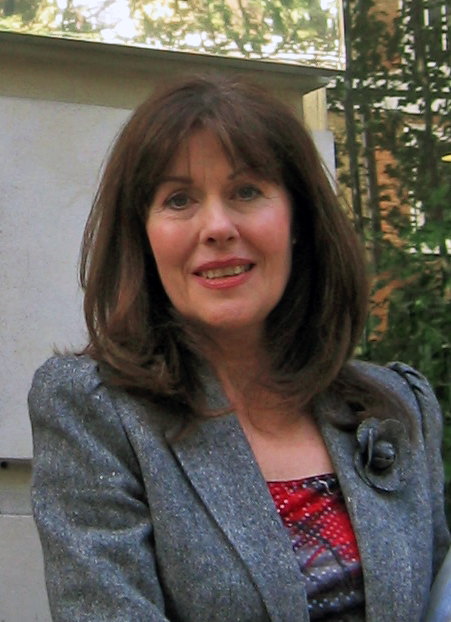
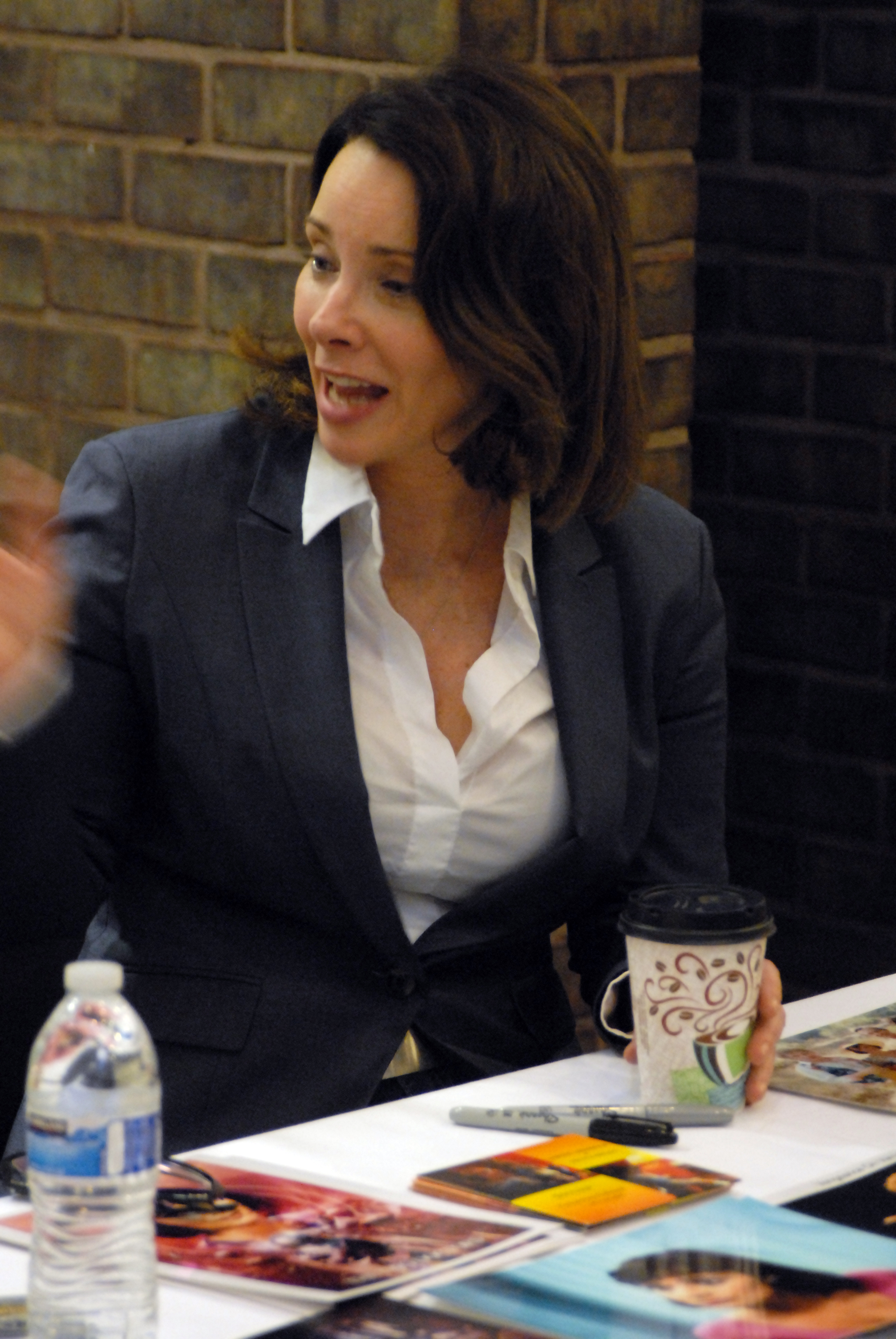
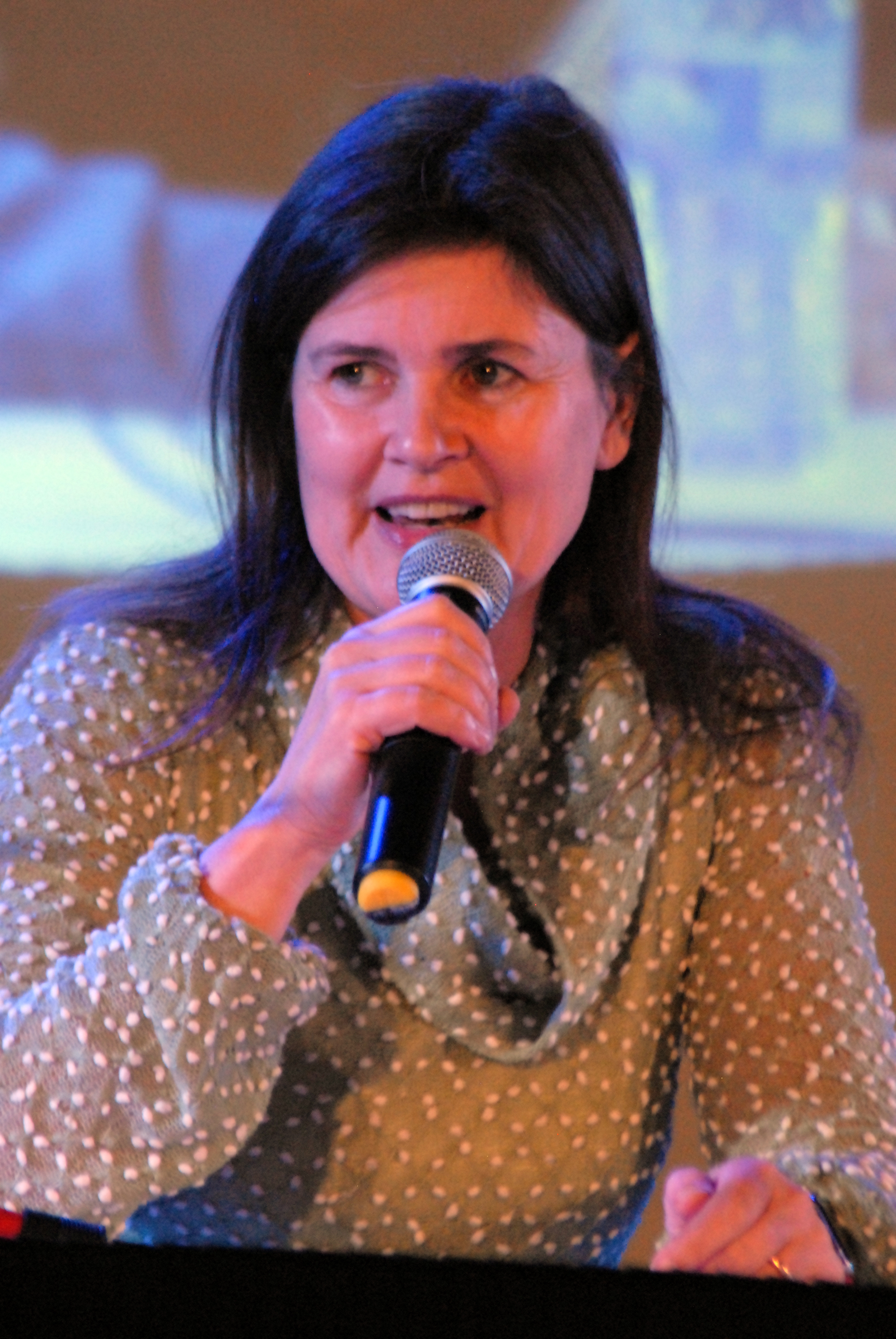
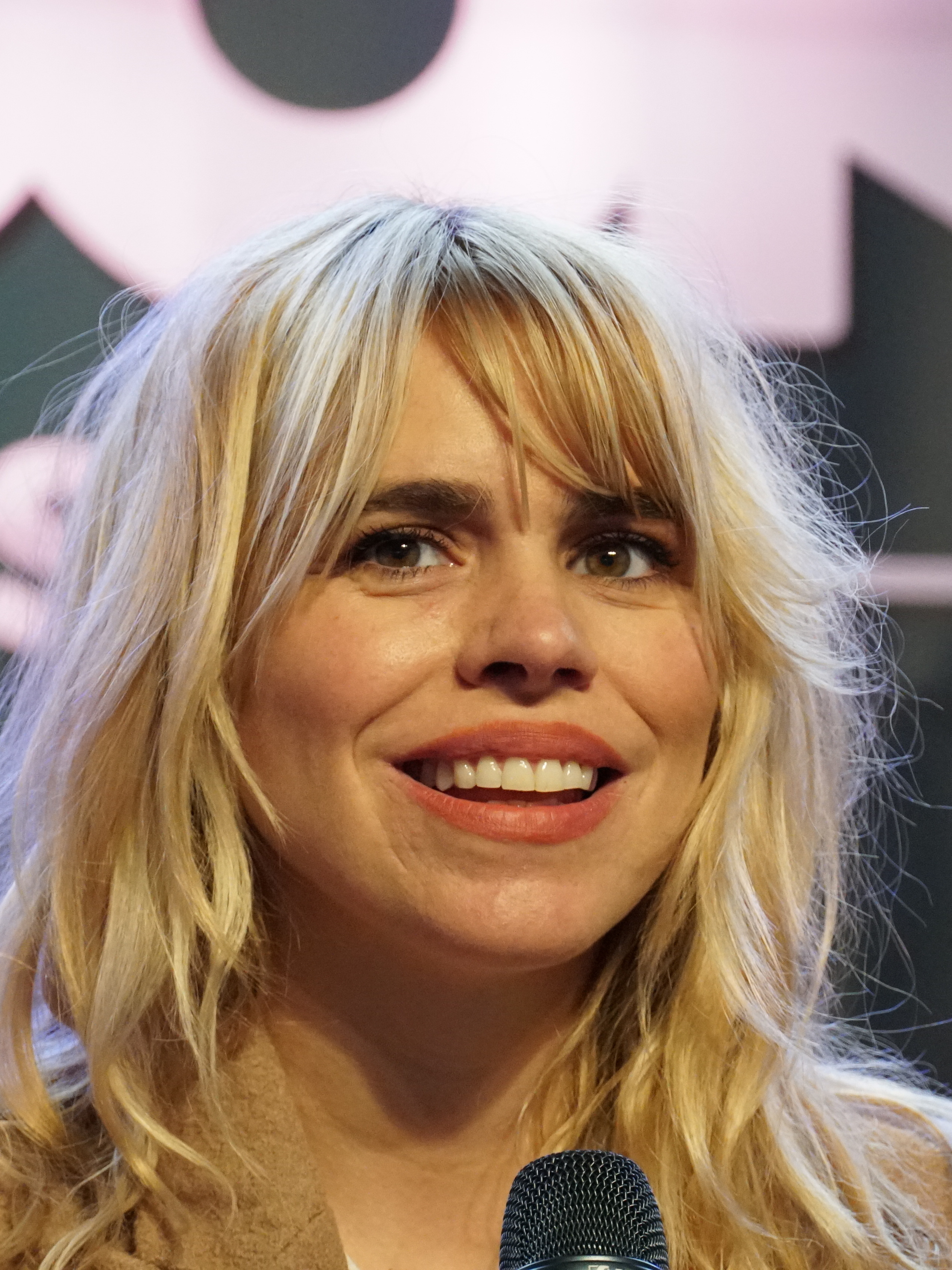
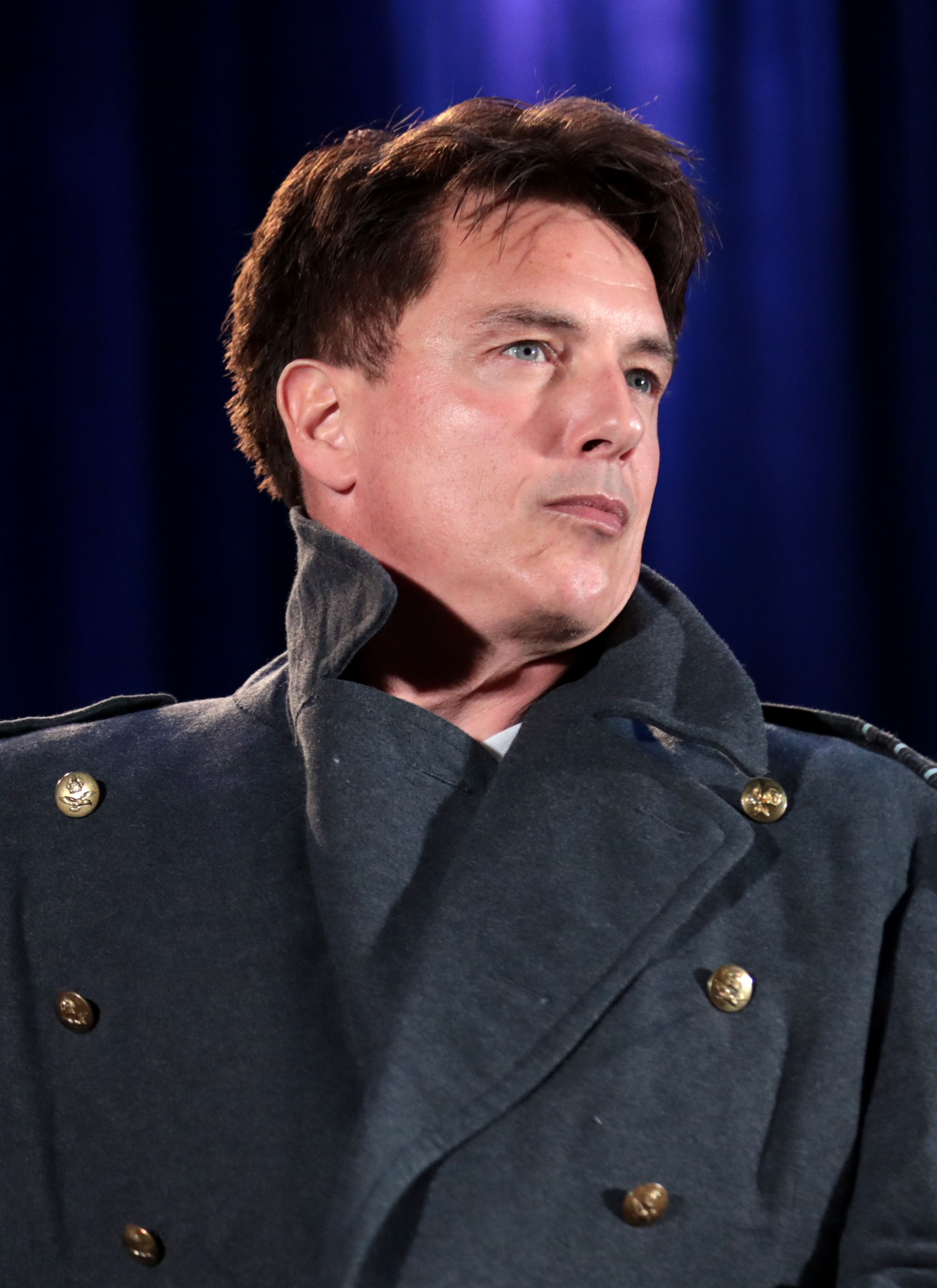
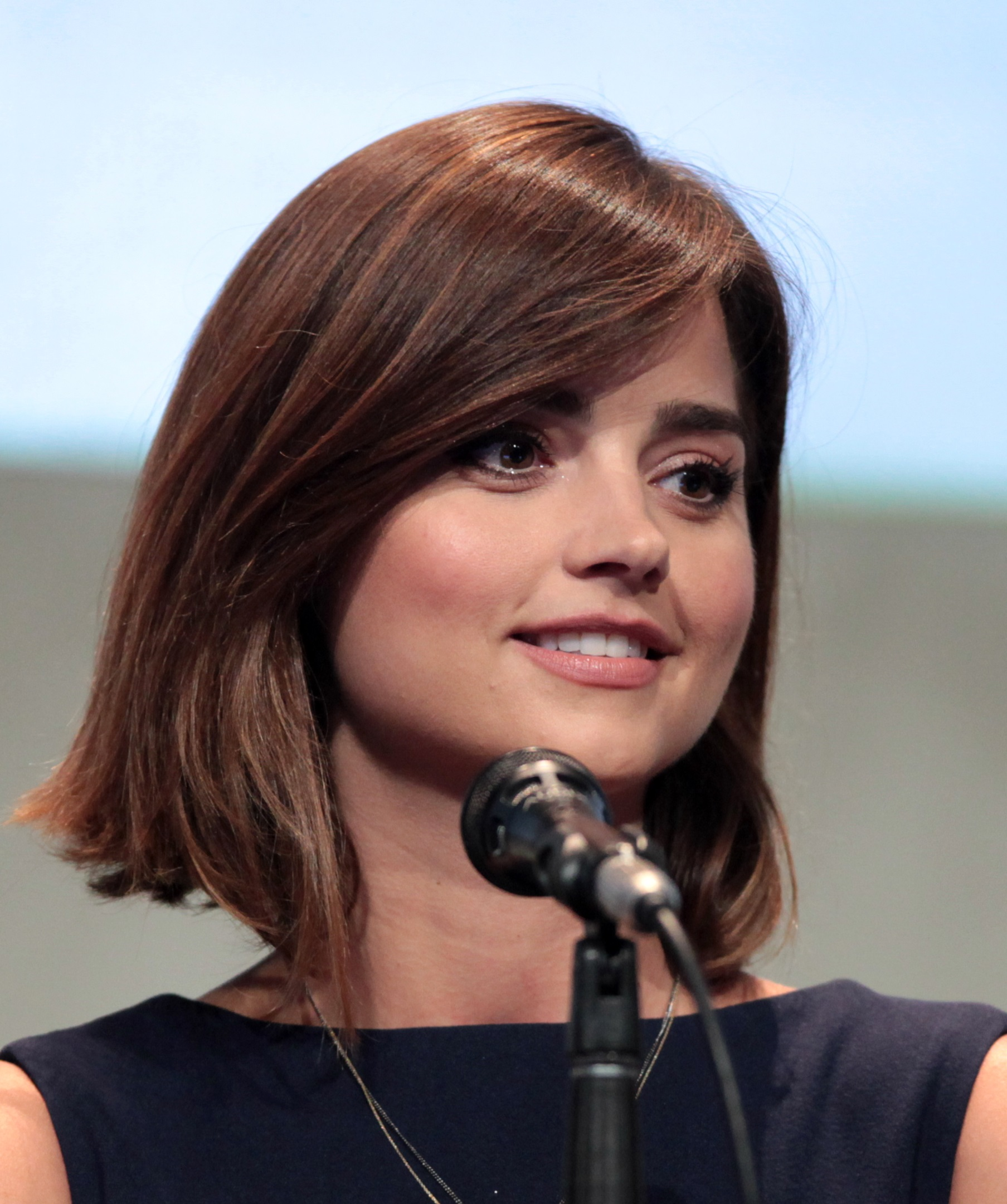
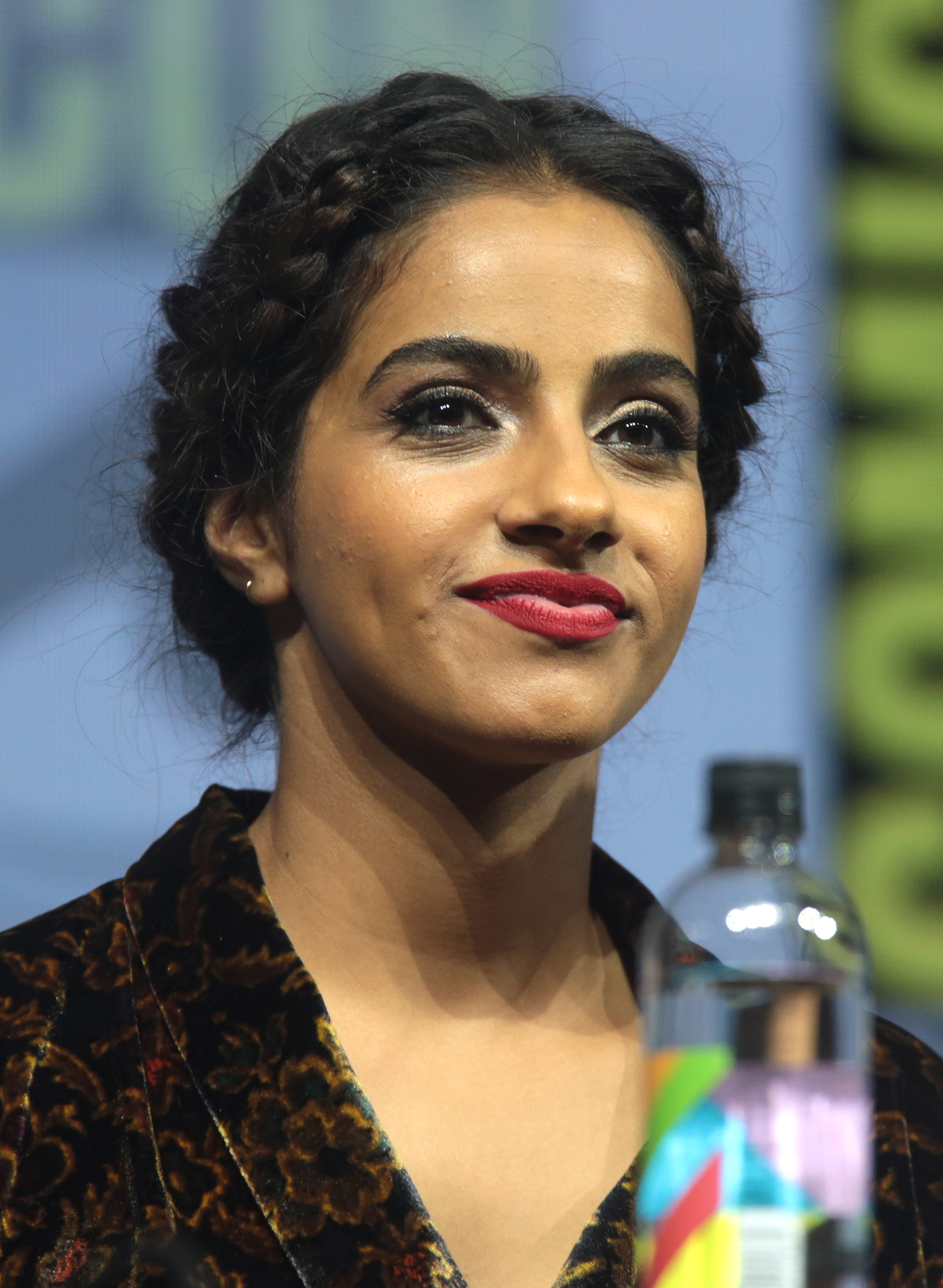
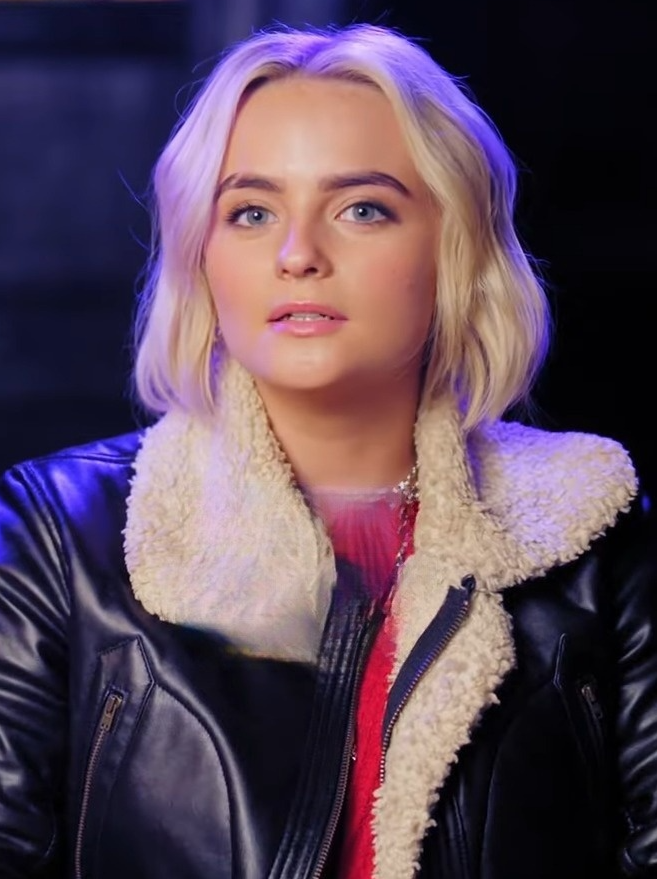
A number of actors have portrayed companions throughout the years. Pictured here, from left to right: Carole Ann Ford (who portrayed Susan Foreman), Frazer Hines (Jamie McCrimmon), Elisabeth Sladen (Sarah Jane Smith), Nicola Bryant (Peri Brown), Sophie Aldred (Ace), Billie Piper (Rose Tyler), John Barrowman (Jack Harkness), Jenna Coleman (Clara Oswald), Mandip Gill (Yasmin Khan), and Millie Gibson (Ruby Sunday).

== Antagonists ==
During the Doctor's travels, a number of villains have been encountered, with many of them serving as antagonists. The Doctor and their companions often work to stop these villains from achieving various villainous schemes and plans.

Antagonists
| Name | Description | First appearance |
|---|---|---|
| The Master | The Doctor's nemesis, the Master is a major recurring antagonist in the series. Also a Time Lord, the Master is a cunning antagonist who engages in a variety of villainous schemes, and their goals include attempting to take over the world and defeating the Doctor. Like the Doctor, the Master can regenerate, and their schemes and motivations often change depending on the incarnation. | Terror of the Autons (1971) |
| Davros | The megalomaniacal creator of the Dalek race. During a war on his home planet Skaro between his race, the Kaleds, and another race called the Thals, Davros mutated his people into the Daleks to ensure their survival. Davros serves as a recurring foe throughout the series, often alongside the Daleks. | Genesis of the Daleks (1975) |
| The Mara | A gestalt, non-corporeal entity that preys upon people through their dreams. It was created from the darkness in the hearts of humans, and hails from a realm known as "The Dark Places of the Inside", which it is bound to and continually attempts to escape from. | Kinda (1982) |
| Rassilon | A mythical figure in Time Lord society, Rassilon aided in the conception of time travel technology that pioneered the Time Lords to power, becoming its "Lord High President" after fellow inventor Omega was lost during its creation. Though dying before the series began, he is later revived, serving as an antagonist in later appearances. | "The Five Doctors" (1983) |
| The Rani | An amoral Time Lord scientist, exiled from Gallifrey due to the dangers of her experiments, the Rani seeks to continue her experiments, which she is willing to achieve at any cost. The Rani, like the Doctor, also has multiple incarnations, with one of them bi-generating and serving as antagonists in the revival's fifteenth series. | The Mark of the Rani (1985) |
| The Valeyard | During the show's twenty-third season, set during a season-long overarching story arc where the Sixth Doctor is put on trial by the Time Lords, the Valeyard serves as the court prosecutor, attempting to find the Doctor guilty. The Valeyard is eventually revealed to be an "amalgamation of the darker sides" of the Doctor's nature from somewhere toward the end of the Doctor's life. | The Mysterious Planet (1986) |
| Cassandra | Cassandra is a human from the far future. Driven by vanity and a desire to be beautiful above all else, she has undergone many surgeries, eventually being left as nothing more than a stretched piece of skin on a frame. She encounters the Doctor twice; in the first, she attempts to kill the passengers of a space station to collect their insurance money, while in the second, she attempts to possess and steal Rose's body. | "The End of the World" (2005) |
| Midnight Entity | The Midnight Entity is a mysterious creature first encountered on the planet Midnight. It has no visibly known physical appearance and has only vague details known about its history, motivations, and abilities. | "Midnight" (2008) |

=== Aliens and creatures ===
During the course of the series, the Doctor encounters many creatures, including alien species, with many of them acting as major antagonists or supporting characters.

Aliens and creatures
| Name | Description | First appearance |
|---|---|---|
| Dalek | Highly xenophobic, militant cyborgs that hail from the planet Skaro. The Daleks seek to conquer the universe and kill all other forms of life. The Daleks were the first alien species featured in the series and have subsequently recurred throughout the series. | The Daleks (1963–1964) |
| Cyberman | Cyborgs who originally hail from Earth's twin planet, Mondas. Having cybernetically enhanced themselves to avoid death, they removed all emotion and now seek a variety of goals, including the conversion of other lifeforms into Cybermen. | The Tenth Planet (1966) |
| Yeti | Robotic minions of the non-corporeal entity known as the Great Intelligence. The Yeti are used by the Intelligence during several of its invasions. | The Abominable Snowmen (1967) |
| Ice Warrior | A reptilian warrior race from the planet Mars. Bound by an honour code, the Ice Warriors wear bio-mechanical armor that provides protection from attack and hostile temperature changes, as well as providing weaponry. | The Ice Warriors (1967) |
| Time Lord | The Time Lords are a race of humanoid beings who hail from the planet Gallifrey. The Time Lords are the race that created time travel in-universe, and, when killed, have the ability to regenerate, which allows them to survive lethal injuries, and causes them to change their physical appearance. The Doctor is one of their number. | The War Games (1969) |
| Nestene Consciousness and Auton | The Nestene Consciousness is a formless, non-corporeal entity that possesses the ability to control and manipulate plastic. The Autons are living plastic mannequins, which the Nestene uses as its footsoldiers in its invasions. | Spearhead from Space (1970) |
| Silurian | The Silurians and Sea Devils are a race of reptilian humanoids that hail from Earth. Hailing from the dawn of its history as the original inhabitants of the planet, they put themselves into hibernation to avoid an extinction event, but as the event never occurred, their computers never awoke them, leaving them trapped in hibernation. | Doctor Who and the Silurians (1970) |
| Sea Devil | The Silurians and Sea Devils are a race of reptilian humanoids that hail from Earth. Hailing from the dawn of its history as the original inhabitants of the planet, they put themselves into hibernation to avoid an extinction event, but as the event never occurred, their computers never awoke them, leaving them trapped in hibernation. | The Sea Devils (1972) |
| Sontaran | A clone race from the planet Sontar. Sontarans are war-like and militaristic, taking great pride in battle. They are locked into an eternal war with an alien species known as the Rutans. | The Time Warrior (1973–1974) |
| Zygon | A race of shapeshifters who hail from the planet Zygor. Their home planet was destroyed, resulting in them seeking out new planets to conquer as a new home. | Terror of the Zygons (1975) |
| Slitheen | The Slitheen are a criminal family of Raxicoricofallapatorians, a species who hail from the planet Raxicoricofallapatorius. They are capable of disguising themselves as humans via skin suits, which they use to infiltrate human environments. | "Aliens of London" (2005) |
| Ood | A peaceful race who hail from a planet known as the Ood-Sphere. The Ood, in the past, were enslaved by a company named "Ood Operations", and were sold to humans in the far future as slave labour. | "The Impossible Planet" (2006) |
| Weeping Angel | A race of aliens who are "quantum-locked", meaning that when observed, they turn to stone, and can only move when unobserved. One touch from a Weeping Angel sends the one touched back in time, with the resultant temporal energy being used by the Angel as a food source. | "Blink" (2007) |
| Silent | A race of beings that can only be perceived while being observed, being instantly forgotten once unobserved. Many are associated with the Silence, an organisation that seeks to kill the Eleventh Doctor. | "The Impossible Astronaut" (2011) |

== Other supporting characters ==
Other supporting characters
| Name | Description | First appearance |
|---|---|---|
| UNIT | A military organisation that recurs throughout the series that specialises in dealing with alien threats. UNIT notably serve as major supporting characters while the Third Doctor is exiled on Earth. | The Invasion (1968) |
| Kate Lethbridge-Stewart | The daughter of the Brigadier, Kate later serves as the head of UNIT as well as serving as its chief scientific advisor. Kate serves as a recurring character in the series, and additionally appears as a major character in 2025 spin-off series The War Between the Land and the Sea. | Downtime (1995) |
| Iris Wildthyme | Initially created as an original character, Wildthyme was incorporated into Doctor Who spin-off media throughout the 1990s, including in her own spin-off series. Iris's irreverent, eclectic character and stories are characterised by her creator, Paul Magrs, as characterising her as someone who cannot "be seen as good or bad, she's just muddling through". | Marked for Life (1995) |
| Jackie Tyler | Mother of Rose Tyler, Jackie serves as a major recurring supporting character during Rose's travels with the Doctor. Jackie becomes involved in a number of the Ninth Doctor and Rose's adventures, assisting them on several occasions. | "Rose" (2005) |
| Harriet Jones | Originally the MP of the fictional Flydale North, Harriet Jones ends up becoming the Prime Minister of England. After she orders the destruction of an alien ship, the Doctor manipulates her fall from power, and she later dies fighting the Daleks. | "Aliens of London" (2005) |
| Torchwood Institute | The Torchwood Institute is an organisation created by Queen Victoria to protect the United Kingdom from what are deemed alien threats, including the Doctor. The Institute is later taken over by former companion Jack Harkness, who seeks to steer it away from its past roots, with this version being the main focus of the spin-off series Torchwood. | "Army of Ghosts" (2006) |
| Church of the Papal Mainframe | The Church of the Papal Mainframe is an interstellar, militant church that hails from the 51st century. The Church acts akin to a "security hub", despite being a religious order, with the Church seeking to protect innocents. | "The Time of Angels" (2010) |
| Paternoster Gang | A trio consisting of the Silurian Madame Vastra, human Jenny Flint, and Sontaran Strax. Jenny and Vastra are in a lesbian relationship, with Strax acting as their butler. The trio work together in Victorian London, where they solve mysteries. | "A Good Man Goes to War" (2011) |
| Danny Pink | A man who acts as companion Clara Oswald's boyfriend during the revival's eighth series. A former soldier, Danny works as a maths teacher in the school where Clara works. | "Into the Dalek" (2014) |
| Ashildr | A young girl from the Viking era who becomes immortal after the Twelfth Doctor saves her life. Ashildr ends up enduring until the end of the universe, and repeatedly comes into conflict with the Doctor as she becomes more jaded over her years of living. | "The Girl Who Died" (2015) |
