= Judy Huxtable =

British actress (born 1942)

- Born: 24 July 1942 (age 84); Surrey, England
- Occupation: Actress
- Years active: 1960–1979
- Spouses: Sean Kenny (m. 1966; div. 1973) Peter Cook (m. 1973; div. 1989)
- Children: 2

Judy Huxtable (born 24 July 1942) is a British actress.

== Early life and career ==
Born in Surrey, England, to wealthy parents, Huxtable was initially a society débutante and later became a fashionable figure in 1960s swinging London. As a model, she was represented by the William Morris Agency. She was the face of Bacardi rum and Fry’s Chocolate.

Huxtable's film appearances include Les Bicyclettes de Belsize (1968), the cult film The Touchables (1968), and several horror films.

== Personal life ==
Huxtable was first married to Irish theatre designer Sean Kenny, but later divorced him. In 1973 she became the second wife of the satirist Peter Cook and appeared with him on the 1977 Godley & Creme concept album Consequences, together with a brief appearance in his 1979 comedy film Derek and Clive Get the Horn, co-starring Dudley Moore. They were divorced in 1989, owing to Cook's drinking, after many years of amicable separation.

In 2008 she published an autobiography, Loving Peter, in which she described her turbulent relationship with Cook and living with his alcoholism, which mirrored her experiences with her own mother. Huxtable published the book under her married name of Judy Cook.

== Filmography ==
- Piccadilly Third Stop (1960) - Bride
- Those Magnificent Men in Their Flying Machines (1965) - Bridgitte, Girl at Dover Beach (uncredited)
- Licensed to Kill (1965) - Computer Centre Girl
- The Psychopath (1966) - Louise Saville
- The Touchables (1968) - Sadie
- Les Bicyclettes de Belsize (1968) - The Girl ('Julie')
- Scream and Scream Again (1970) - Sylvia
- Every Home Should Have One (1970) - Frankenstein Heroine
- Up the Chastity Belt (1971) - Gretel
- Die Screaming, Marianne (1971) - Hildegard
- Nobody Ordered Love (1972) - Caroline Johnson
- Derek and Clive Get the Horn (1979) - Judy Cook (herself)
