= 1972 in British music =

This is a summary of 1972 in music in the United Kingdom, including the official charts from that year.

== Events ==
- 20 January – The premiere of Pink Floyd's The Dark Side of the Moon at the Dome, Brighton, is halted by technical difficulties. The Dark Side of the Moon would be played in its entirety the following night, but it would be a full year before the album was released.
- 21 January – Keith Richards jumps on stage to jam with Chuck Berry at the Hollywood Palladium but is ordered off for playing too loud. Berry later claims that he did not recognise Richards and would not have booted him off the stage if he had known who he was.
- 9 February – Paul McCartney's new band, Wings, make their live debut at the University of Nottingham. It is McCartney's first public concert since the Beatles' 1966 US tour.
- 13 February – Led Zeppelin's concert in Singapore is cancelled when government officials will not let them off the aeroplane because of their long hair.
- 19 February – Paul McCartney's single "Give Ireland Back to the Irish" (which was inspired by the "Bloody Sunday" massacre in Ireland on 30 January 1972) is banned by the BBC.
- 25 March – The 17th Eurovision Song Contest is held in the Usher Hall, Edinburgh, Scotland. The only time (as of 2021) Scotland has hosted the contest.
- 16 April – Electric Light Orchestra make their live debut at the Fox and Greyhound pub in Park Lane, Croydon, England.
- 2 May – Stone the Crows lead guitarist Les Harvey is electrocuted on stage during a show in Swansea, Wales, by touching a poorly connected microphone. Harvey died in a hospital a few hours later. The band's lead singer, Maggie Bell, Harvey's longtime girlfriend, was also hospitalised, having collapsed on stage after the incident.
- 1 June – premiere of Harrison Birtwistle's The Triumph of Time in London.
- 12 July – first performance of Peter Maxwell Davies's opera Taverner at the Royal Opera House.
- 7 September – The UK premiere of Carré for four orchestras and four choirs by Karlheinz Stockhausen takes place at the Proms.
- 8 October – David Hughes is taken ill while singing the role of Pinkerton in Madam Butterfly in London. He completes the performance but dies shortly afterwards of heart failure.

== Number Ones ==
=== Singles ===
Date	Single	Artist
8 January	"I'd Like to Teach the World to Sing (In Perfect Harmony)"	The New Seekers
15 January	"I'd Like to Teach the World to Sing (In Perfect Harmony)"	The New Seekers
22 January	"I'd Like to Teach the World to Sing (In Perfect Harmony)"	The New Seekers
29 January	"I'd Like to Teach the World to Sing (In Perfect Harmony)"	The New Seekers
5 February	"Telegram Sam"	T. Rex
12 February	"Telegram Sam"	T. Rex
19 February	"Son of My Father"	Chicory Tip
26 February	"Son of My Father"	Chicory Tip
4 March	"Son of My Father"	Chicory Tip
11 March	"Without You"	Nilsson
18 March	"Without You"	Nilsson
25 March	"Without You"	Nilsson
1 April	"Without You"	Nilsson
8 April	"Without You"	Nilsson
15 April	"Amazing Grace"	The Pipes and the Drums and the Military Band of the Royal Scots Dragoon Guards
22 April	"Amazing Grace"	The Pipes and the Drums and the Military Band of the Royal Scots Dragoon Guards
29 April	"Amazing Grace"	The Pipes and the Drums and the Military Band of the Royal Scots Dragoon Guards
6 May	"Amazing Grace"	The Pipes and the Drums and the Military Band of the Royal Scots Dragoon Guards
13 May	"Amazing Grace"	The Pipes and the Drums and the Military Band of the Royal Scots Dragoon Guards
20 May	"Metal Guru"	T. Rex
27 May	"Metal Guru"	T. Rex
3 June	"Metal Guru"	T. Rex
10 June	"Metal Guru"	T. Rex
17 June	"Vincent"	Don McLean
24 June	"Vincent"	Don McLean
1 July	"Take Me Bak 'Ome"	Slade
8 July	"Puppy Love"	Donny Osmond
15 July	"Puppy Love"	Donny Osmond
22 July	"Puppy Love"	Donny Osmond
29 July	"Puppy Love"	Donny Osmond
5 August	"Puppy Love"	Donny Osmond
12 August	"School's Out"	Alice Cooper
19 August	"School's Out"	Alice Cooper
26 August	"School's Out"	Alice Cooper
2 September	"You Wear It Well"	Rod Stewart
9 September	"Mama Weer All Crazee Now"	Slade
16 September	"Mama Weer All Crazee Now"	Slade
23 September	"Mama Weer All Crazee Now"	Slade
30 September	"How Can I Be Sure"	David Cassidy
7 October	"How Can I Be Sure"	David Cassidy
14 October	"Mouldy Old Dough"	Lieutenant Pigeon
21 October	"Mouldy Old Dough"	Lieutenant Pigeon
28 October	"Mouldy Old Dough"	Lieutenant Pigeon
4 November	"Mouldy Old Dough"	Lieutenant Pigeon
11 November	"Clair"	Gilbert O'Sullivan
18 November	"Clair"	Gilbert O'Sullivan
25 November	"My Ding-a-Ling"	Chuck Berry
2 December	"My Ding-a-Ling"	Chuck Berry
9 December	"My Ding-a-Ling"	Chuck Berry
16 December	"My Ding-a-Ling"	Chuck Berry
23 December	"Long Haired Lover from Liverpool"	Little Jimmy Osmond
30 December	"Long Haired Lover from Liverpool"	Little Jimmy Osmond

=== Albums ===
Date	Album	Artist
8 January	Electric Warrior	T. Rex
15 January	Electric Warrior	T. Rex
22 January	Electric Warrior	T. Rex
29 January	Concert for Bangla Desh	Various Artists
5 February	Electric Warrior	T. Rex
12 February	Electric Warrior	T. Rex
19 February	Neil Reid	Neil Reid
26 February	Neil Reid	Neil Reid
4 March	Neil Reid	Neil Reid
11 March	Harvest	Neil Young
18 March	Paul Simon	Paul Simon
25 March	Fog on the Tyne	Lindisfarne
1 April	Fog on the Tyne	Lindisfarne
8 April	Fog on the Tyne	Lindisfarne
15 April	Fog on the Tyne	Lindisfarne
22 April	Machine Head	Deep Purple
29 April	Machine Head	Deep Purple
6 May	Prophets, Seers & Sages: The Angels of the Ages / My People Were Fair and Had Sky in Their Hair... But Now They're Content to Wear Stars on Their Brows	T. Rex
13 May	Machine Head	Deep Purple
20 May	Bolan Boogie	T. Rex
27 May	Bolan Boogie	T. Rex
3 June	Bolan Boogie	T. Rex
10 June	Exile on Main St.	The Rolling Stones
17 June	20 Dynamic Hits	Various Artists
24 June	20 Dynamic Hits	Various Artists
1 July	20 Dynamic Hits	Various Artists
8 July	20 Dynamic Hits	Various Artists
15 July	20 Dynamic Hits	Various Artists
22 July	20 Dynamic Hits	Various Artists
29 July	20 Dynamic Hits	Various Artists
5 August	20 Dynamic Hits	Various Artists
12 August	20 Fantastic Hits	Various Artists
19 August	20 Fantastic Hits	Various Artists
26 August	20 Fantastic Hits	Various Artists
2 September	20 Fantastic Hits	Various Artists
9 September	20 Fantastic Hits	Various Artists
16 September	Never a Dull Moment	Rod Stewart
23 September	Never a Dull Moment	Rod Stewart
30 September	20 Fantastic Hits	Various Artists
7 October	20 All-Time Greats of the 50s	Various Artists
14 October	20 All-Time Greats of the 50s	Various Artists
21 October	20 All-Time Greats of the 50s	Various Artists
28 October	20 All-Time Greats of the 50s	Various Artists
4 November	20 All-Time Greats of the 50s	Various Artists
11 November	20 All-Time Greats of the 50s	Various Artists
18 November	20 All-Time Greats of the 50s	Various Artists
25 November	20 All-Time Greats of the 50s	Various Artists
2 December	25 Rockin' and Rollin' Greats	Various Artists
9 December	25 Rockin' and Rollin' Greats	Various Artists
16 December	25 Rockin' and Rollin' Greats	Various Artists
23 December	20 All-Time Greats of the 50s	Various Artists
30 December	20 All-Time Greats of the 50s	Various Artists

== Year-end charts ==
=== Best-selling singles ===
No.	Title	Artist	Peak position
1	"Amazing Grace"	The Pipes and Drums and the Military Band of the Royal Scots Dragoon Guards	1
2	"Mouldy Old Dough"	Lieutenant Pigeon	1
3	"Puppy Love"	Donny Osmond	1
4	"Without You"	Nilsson	1
5	"I'd Like to Teach the World to Sing (In Perfect Harmony)"	The New Seekers	1
6	"Son of My Father"	Chicory Tip	1
7	"Rock and Roll (Parts 1 & 2)"	Gary Glitter	2
8	"Metal Guru"	T. Rex	1
9	"Mother of Mine"	Neil Reid	2
10	"Telegram Sam"	T. Rex	1
11	"American Pie"	Don McLean	2
12	"Mama Weer All Crazee Now"	Slade	1
13	"School's Out"	Alice Cooper	1
14	"You Wear It Well"	Rod Stewart	1
15	"Beg, Steal or Borrow"	The New Seekers	2
16	"Vincent"	Don McLean	1
17	"Clair"	Gilbert O'Sullivan	1
18	"My Ding-a-Ling"	Chuck Berry	1
19	"How Can I Be Sure"	David Cassidy	1
20	"Sylvia's Mother"	Dr. Hook & the Medicine Show	2

=== Best-selling albums ===
A list of the top twenty best-selling albums of 1972 was published in the issue of Record Mirror dated 13 January 1973, and a top fifty was later reproduced in the first edition of the BPI Year Book in 1976. However, in 2007, the Official Charts Company published album chart histories for each year from 1956 to 1977, researched by historian Sharon Mawer, and included an updated list of the top ten best-selling albums for each year based on the new research. The updated top ten for 1972 is shown in the table below.

No.	Title	Artist	Peak position
1	20 Dynamic Hits	Various Artists	1
2	20 All Time Hits of the 50s	Various Artists	1
3	Greatest Hits	Simon & Garfunkel	2
4	Never a Dull Moment	Rod Stewart	1
5	20 Fantastic Hits	Various Artists	1
6	Bridge over Troubled Water	Simon & Garfunkel	2 (Note: Reached number 1 in 1970 and 1971)
7	Slade Alive!	Slade	2
8	Fog on the Tyne	Lindisfarne	1
9	25 Rockin' and Rollin' Greats	Various Artists	1
10	American Pie	Don McLean	2

== Classical works ==
- Hugh Wood – Violin concerto no 1

== Film and incidental music ==
=== Film ===
- John Addison – Sleuth directed by Joseph L. Mankiewicz, starring Laurence Olivier and Michael Caine.
- Ron Goodwin – Frenzy directed by Alfred Hitchcock.
- David Munrow – Henry VIII and His Six Wives.
- Eric Rogers – Carry On Matron.

=== Television ===
- Herbert Chappell
  - Clouds of Witness
  - The Shadow of the Tower

== Musical Films ==
- John Barry – Alice's Adventures in Wonderland.

== Births ==
- 17 January – Aqualung, singer-songwriter
- 27 January – Mark Owen, singer (Take That)
- 20 February – Neil Primrose, drummer (Travis)
- 29 February – Steve Hart, singer (Worlds Apart)
- 4 March – Alison Wheeler, singer (The Beautiful South)
- 16 March – Andy Dunlop, lead guitarist, banjoist (Travis)
- 20 March
  - Alex Kapranos, singer and guitarist (Franz Ferdinand)
  - Shelly Poole, singer (Alisha's Attic)
- 29 March – Monty Adkins, composer, performer and lecturer in electroacoustic music.
- March – Natasha Barrett, composer of electroacoustic music
- 27 April – Rob Coombes, keyboardist (Supergrass)
- 15 May – Conrad Keely, English-American singer-songwriter and guitarist (...And You Will Know Us by the Trail of Dead)
- 26 May – Alan White, drummer (Oasis)
- 14 June – Dominic Brown, English guitarist and songwriter
- 17 June – Rikrok, British-Jamaican singer
- 6 July – Mark Gasser, English pianist and educator
- 11 July – Cormac Battle, English-Irish singer-songwriter, guitarist, and producer (Kerbdog and Wilt)
- 6 August – Geri Halliwell, singer (Spice Girls)
- 8 August – Bitty McLean, reggae singer
- 15 August – Mikey Graham, Irish singer (Boyzone)
- 6 September – Tony Dowding, singer (Bad Boys Inc)
- 13 September – Matt Everitt, drummer (Menswear)
- 20 September – Aaron Poole, singer (Worlds Apart)
- 21 September – Liam Gallagher, singer (Oasis)
- 14 November – Dougie Payne, bassist (Travis)
- 23 November – Rick Witter, singer (Shed Seven)
- 3 December – Dan Bowyer, singer (Worlds Apart)
- 10 December – Brian Molko, singer (Placebo)
- 11 December – Easther Bennett, singer (Eternal)
- 13 December – Niki Evans, actress and singer

== Deaths ==
- 20 February – Herbert Menges, conductor and composer, 69
- 21 March – David McCallum Sr., violinist and the father of David McCallum, 74
- 28 September – Rory Storm, singer, 33 (post-operative complications).
- 19 October – David Hughes, opera singer, 47 (heart failure)
- 28 November – Havergal Brian, composer, 96
- date unknown
  - Jimmy MacBeath, folk singer, 77/78
  - Ivor McMahon, violinist, 47/48

== See also ==
- 1972 in British radio
- 1972 in British television
- 1972 in the United Kingdom
- List of British films of 1972
