= 1972 in British radio =

This is a list of events in British radio during 1972.

== Events ==
=== January ===
- 1 January – The Greenwich Time Signal broadcast on BBC radio now records Coordinated Universal Time and the sixth pip is extended to 0.5 s duration.
- 19 January – The government announces the lifting of all restrictions on broadcasting hours on television and radio.

=== February ===
- No events.

=== March ===
- 31 March – BBC Radio 2 airs its final Breakfast Special.

=== April ===
- 1 April – BBC Radio 2 moves its daily start time to 5.00am, representing a slight increase to their daily broadcasting hours, apart from on Sundays on which its day continues to begin at 6.55am.
- 2 April – First edition of the comedy panel game I'm Sorry I Haven't a Clue is aired on BBC Radio 4. In 2020 (when it will still be running) the programme will be voted the greatest radio comedy of all time by a panel convened by Radio Times.
- 3 April – Terry Wogan joins Radio 2 to present the new weekday breakfast show.

=== May ===
- No events.

=== June ===
- No events.

=== July ===
- 12 July – Following the enabling of The Sound Broadcasting Act 1972, The Independent Broadcasting Authority is formed, paving the way for the launch of Independent Local Radio.

=== August ===
- 25 August – Following a decision by the government to restrict the BBC to twenty local radio stations, the corporation responds by closing BBC Radio Durham. Its resources are transferred to Carlisle where BBC Radio Carlisle, later BBC Radio Cumbria, is launched.

=== September ===
- 2 September –
  - BBC Local Radio begins broadcasting on MW.
  - BBC Radio 3 begins transmitting on one MW frequency – 647 kHz (464 metres).
  - BBC Radio 4 begins transmitting on one of there MW frequencies – 1151, 1052, 908 or 692 kHz (251, 285, 330 to 434 metres) with all regional variations now airing only on VHF.
- 24 September – Pick of the Pops is broadcast for the final time.

=== October ===
- The Independent Broadcasting Authority invites applications for the first two local radio licences in London: one for a general and entertainment station, the other for news and information. The licence for the entertainment service sees eight organisations applying, many of them with established entertainment pedigrees, including Associated Television and Isle of Man broadcaster Manx Radio.
- 1 October – The first edition of a new Sunday teatime programme Solid Gold Sixty is broadcast on BBC Radio 1. Presented by Tom Browne, the programme consists of two hours featuring the Radio One playlist tracks which are not in the Top 20, followed by a one-hour Top 20 rundown from 6pm – 7pm (which is carried also on BBC Radio 2's FM transmitters).
- 5 October – Due to high demand by residents who do not have VHF/FM on their radios, BBC Radio Oxford begins broadcasting on 202 metres medium wave (1484 kHz).

=== November ===
- 4 November – Radios 2 and 4 begin broadcasting in stereo in South East England. Stereo is rolled out to the rest of the country over subsequent years.

=== December ===
- No events.

== Station debuts ==
- Hereford Hospital Radio

== Programme debuts ==
- 11 April – I'm Sorry I Haven't a Clue on BBC Radio 4 (1972–Present)
- Unknown – Milligna (or Your Favourite Spike) on BBC Radio 4 (1972)

== Continuing radio programmes ==
=== 1940s ===
- Sunday Half Hour (1940–2018)
- Desert Island Discs (1942–Present)
- Down Your Way (1946–1992)
- Letter from America (1946–2004)
- Woman's Hour (1946–Present)
- A Book at Bedtime (1949–Present)

=== 1950s ===
- The Archers (1950–Present)
- The Today Programme (1957–Present)
- The Navy Lark (1959–1977)
- Sing Something Simple (1959–2001)
- Your Hundred Best Tunes (1959–2007)

=== 1960s ===
- Farming Today (1960–Present)
- In Touch (1961–Present)
- The Men from the Ministry (1962–1977)
- I'm Sorry, I'll Read That Again (1964–1973)
- Petticoat Line (1965–1979)
- The World at One (1965–Present)
- The Official Chart (1967–Present)
- Just a Minute (1967–Present)
- The Living World (1968–Present)
- The Organist Entertains (1969–2018)

=== 1970s ===
- PM (1970–Present)
- Start the Week (1970–Present)
- Week Ending (1970–1998)
- You and Yours (1970–Present)

== Ending this year ==
- Unknown – Lines from My Grandfather's Forehead (1971–1972)

== Closing this year ==
- 25 August – BBC Radio Durham (1968–1972)

== Births ==
- 23 January – Harriet Scott, radio presenter
- 27 January – Wynne Evans, singer and BBC Radio Wales presenter
- 10 April – Chris Corcoran, Welsh comedian and broadcaster
- 28 April – Anita Anand, journalist and broadcast presenter
- 3 May – Katya Adler, broadcast journalist
- 14 June – Shaun Keaveny, DJ
- 21 July – Justin Edwards, comedy actor
- 26 July – Margherita Taylor, broadcast presenter
- 30 August – Leo Green, jazz saxophonist and radio presenter
- 3 November – Nemone (Metaxas), DJ
- 16 November – Daniel P. Carter, rock guitarist and radio DJ
- 14 December – Miranda Hart, comic actress
- 17 December – Stephen Clements, Northern Irish DJ (died 2020)
- Simon Farquhar, dramatist and broadcaster

== Deaths ==
- 2 March – Franklin Engelmann, presenter (b. 1908)
- 15 October – Douglas Smith, announcer (b. 1924)
- 15 November – Freddie Grisewood, presenter (b. 1888)

== See also ==
- 1972 in British music
- 1972 in British television
- 1972 in the United Kingdom
- List of British films of 1972
