= List of British films of 1972 =

British films released in 1972

A list of films produced in the United Kingdom in 1972 (see 1972 in film):

== Feature films ==
Title	Director	Cast	Genre	Notes
1972
The Alf Garnett Saga	Bob Kellett	Warren Mitchell, Dandy Nichols, Adrienne Posta	Comedy	Spin-off from TV series Till Death Us Do Part
Alice's Adventures in Wonderland	William Sterling	Fiona Fullerton, Michael Crawford, Peter Sellers	Musical	
All Coppers Are...	Sidney Hayers	Martin Potter, Julia Foster, Nicky Henson	Crime drama	
The Amazing Mr Blunden	Lionel Jeffries	Laurence Naismith, Lynne Frederick, Diana Dors	Family	
Antony and Cleopatra	Charlton Heston	Charlton Heston, Eric Porter, John Castle	Historical drama	
The Asphyx	Peter Newbrook	Robert Stephens, Robert Powell, Jane Lapotaire	Horror	
The Assassination of Trotsky	Joseph Losey	Richard Burton, Romy Schneider, Alain Delon	Historical drama	Co-production with France & Italy
Asylum	Roy Ward Baker	Peter Cushing, Britt Ekland, Herbert Lom	Portmanteau horror	
Au Pair Girls	Val Guest	Astrid Frank, Gabrielle Drake, Richard O'Sullivan	Sex comedy	
Bless This House	Gerald Thomas	Sid James, Terry Scott, Sally Geeson	Comedy	Spin-off of Bless This House
Brother Sun, Sister Moon	Franco Zeffirelli	Graham Faulkner, Judi Bowker, Leigh Lawson	Biopic	Co-production with Italy
Burke & Hare	Vernon Sewell	Derren Nesbitt, Harry Andrews, Glynn Edwards	Horror	
The Call of the Wild	Ken Annakin	Charlton Heston, Michèle Mercier, Raimund Harmstorf	Adventure	
Carry On Abroad	Gerald Thomas	Sid James, Kenneth Williams, Charles Hawtrey	Comedy	
Carry On Matron	Gerald Thomas	Kenneth Williams, Sid James, Barbara Windsor	Comedy	
Danny Jones	Jules Bricken	Frank Finlay, Jane Carr, Len Jones	Drama	
The Darwin Adventure	Jack Couffer	Nicholas Clay, Ian Richardson, Robert Flemyng	Biopic	
A Day in the Death of Joe Egg	Peter Medak	Alan Bates, Janet Suzman, Peter Bowles	Comedy drama	
Death Line	Gary Sherman	Donald Pleasence, David Ladd, Norman Rossington	Horror	
Demons of the Mind	Peter Sykes	Gillian Hills, Shane Briant, Robert Hardy	Horror	
Doomwatch	Peter Sasdy	Ian Bannen, Judy Geeson, George Sanders	Sci-fi mystery	TV series spin-off
Dracula AD 1972	Alan Gibson	Christopher Lee, Peter Cushing, Stephanie Beacham	Horror	
Embassy	Gordon Hessler	Richard Roundtree, Chuck Connors, Ray Milland	Thriller	
Endless Night	Sidney Gilliat	Hayley Mills, Britt Ekland, Hywel Bennett	Mystery	
The Fast Kill	Lindsay Shonteff	Tom Adams, Michael Culver, Peter Halliday	Thriller	
Fear in the Night	Jimmy Sangster	Judy Geeson, Joan Collins, Peter Cushing	Thriller	
The Fiend	Robert Hartford-Davis	Ann Todd, Tony Beckley, Patrick Magee	Horror	
The Flesh and Blood Show	Pete Walker	Ray Brooks, Jenny Hanley, Robin Askwith	Horror	With 3-D sequence
Follow Me!	Carol Reed	Mia Farrow, Chaim Topol, Michael Jayston	Comedy	
For the Love of Ada	Ronnie Baxter	Irene Handl, Wilfred Pickles, Jack Smethurst	Comedy	Spin-off of For the Love of Ada
Four Dimensions of Greta	Pete Walker	Tristan Rogers, Alan Curtis, Robin Askwith	Sex comedy	With 3-D sequences
Frenzy	Alfred Hitchcock	Jon Finch, Barry Foster, Alec McCowen	Thriller	
Go for a Take	Harry Booth	Reg Varney, Dennis Price, Norman Rossington	Comedy	
Henry VIII and His Six Wives	Waris Hussein	Keith Michell, Donald Pleasence, Charlotte Rampling	Historical	Based on a BBC TV series The Six Wives of Henry VIII
Horror Express	Eugenio Martín	Christopher Lee, Peter Cushing, Telly Savalas	Horror	Co-production with Spain
I Want What I Want	John Dexter	Anne Heywood, Harry Andrews, Jill Bennett	Drama	
Images	Robert Altman	Susannah York, René Auberjonois, Marcel Bozzuffi	Drama	
Innocent Bystanders	Peter Collinson	Stanley Baker, Geraldine Chaplin, Dana Andrews	Spy thriller	
Lady Caroline Lamb	Robert Bolt	Sarah Miles, Jon Finch, Richard Chamberlain	Historical	
Madame Sin	David Greene	Bette Davis, Robert Wagner, Denholm Elliott	Thriller	
Made	John Mackenzie	Carol White, Roy Harper, John Castle	Drama	
Mutiny on the Buses	Harry Booth	Reg Varney, Bob Grant, Stephen Lewis	Comedy	TV sitcom spin-off On the Buses sequel
Neither the Sea Nor the Sand	Fred Burnley	Susan Hampshire, Frank Finlay, Jack Lambert	Thriller	Also known as The Exorcism of Hugh
Night Hair Child	Andrea Bianchi	Mark Lester, Britt Ekland, Hardy Krüger	Thriller	
Nobody Ordered Love	Robert Hartford-Davis	Ingrid Pitt, Judy Huxtable, John Ronane	Drama	
Ooh… You Are Awful	Cliff Owen	Dick Emery, Derren Nesbitt, Liza Goddard	Comedy	
The Other Side of the Underneath	Jane Arden	Sheila Allen, Ann Lynn, Penny Slinger	Drama	
Our Miss Fred	Bob Kellett	Danny La Rue, Alfred Marks, Lance Percival	War Comedy	
The Pied Piper	Jacques Demy	Jack Wild, Donald Pleasence, Donovan	Fantasy musical	
Pope Joan	Michael Anderson	Liv Ullmann, Jeremy Kemp, Olivia de Havilland	Historical	
Pulp	Mike Hodges	Michael Caine, Mickey Rooney, Lionel Stander	Comedy thriller	
Rentadick	Jim Clark	James Booth, Richard Briers, Julie Ege	Comedy	
The Ruling Class	Peter Medak	Peter O'Toole, Alastair Sim, Arthur Lowe	Comedy	
Running Scared	David Hemmings	Robert Powell, Gayle Hunnicutt, Barry Morse	Drama	
Savage Messiah	Ken Russell	Dorothy Tutin, Scott Antony, Helen Mirren	Biopic	Biopic of Henri Gaudier-Brzeska
Sex and the Other Woman	Stanley Long	Richard Wattis, Margaret Burton, Bartlett Mullins	Sex comedy	
Sitting Target	Douglas Hickox	Oliver Reed, Jill St. John, Ian McShane	Crime drama	
Sleuth	Joseph L. Mankiewicz	Laurence Olivier, Michael Caine	Mystery thriller	
Something to Hide	Alastair Reid	Peter Finch, Shelley Winters, Linda Hayden	Thriller	
Steptoe and Son	Cliff Owen	Wilfrid Brambell, Harry H. Corbett, Carolyn Seymour	Comedy	Spin-off from Steptoe and Son
Straight on Till Morning	Peter Collinson	Rita Tushingham, Shane Briant	Thriller	
Sunstruck	James Gilbert	Harry Secombe, Maggie Fitzgibbon, John Meillon	Comedy	Co-production with Australia
Tales from the Crypt	Freddie Francis	Ralph Richardson, Joan Collins, Peter Cushing	Horror	Anthology
That's Your Funeral	John Robins	Bill Fraser, Raymond Huntley	Comedy	Based on the TV series of the same name
A Time for Loving	Christopher Miles	Britt Ekland, Mel Ferrer, Joanna Shimkus	Drama	
Tower of Evil	Jim O'Connolly	Bryant Haliday, Jill Haworth, Anna Palk	Horror	
The Triple Echo	Michael Apted	Glenda Jackson, Oliver Reed, Brian Deacon	Drama	Entered into the 8th Moscow International Film Festival
Under Milk Wood	Andrew Sinclair	Richard Burton, Elizabeth Taylor, Peter O'Toole	Comedy drama	
Up the Front	Bob Kellett	Frankie Howerd, Bill Fraser, Zsa Zsa Gabor	Comedy	
Vampire Circus	Robert Young	Anthony Higgins, Adrienne Corri, Lalla Ward	Horror	
What Became of Jack and Jill?	Bill Bain	Vanessa Howard, Mona Washbourne, Paul Nicholas	Thriller	
Young Winston	Richard Attenborough	Simon Ward, Robert Shaw, Anne Bancroft	Biopic	
Zee and Co.	Brian G. Hutton	Elizabeth Taylor, Michael Caine, Susannah York	Drama	

== Documentaries and short films ==
Title	Director	Cast	Genre	Notes
The Boy Who Turned Yellow	Michael Powell	Robert Eddison, Helen Weir, Brian Worth	Family drama	
The Concert for Bangladesh	Saul Swimmer	George Harrison, Ravi Shankar, Bob Dylan	Documentary	Co-production with US
Glastonbury Fayre	Nicolas Roeg	Family, Arthur Brown, Fairport Convention	Documentary	A film of Glastonbury Festival
Hide and Seek	David Eady	Peter Newby, Gary Kemp	Family/adventure	
My Childhood	Bill Douglas		Biopic, Drama	

== Most Popular Films at the British Box Office in 1972 ==
1. Diamonds Are Forever
2. The Godfather
3. Fiddler on the Roof
4. Bedknobs and Broomsticks
5. The Devils
6. Steptoe and Son
7. The French Connection
8. Nicholas and Alexandra
9. Ryan's Daughter
10. Dirty Harry
11. Mary, Queen of Scots
12. A Clockwork Orange
13. What's Up, Doc?
14. Straw Dogs
15. Shaft
16. Klute
17. Young Winston
18. The Go-Between
19. Mutiny on the Buses
20. Sleeping Beauty (1959)
21. Please Sir!
22. Up the Chastity Belt

== See also ==
- 1972 in British music
- 1972 in British radio
- 1972 in British television
- 1972 in the United Kingdom
