= Mother of Mine (song) =

Single by Neil Reid

from the album Neil Reid
- Released: 3 December 1971
- Recorded: 1971
- Genre: Pop ballad
- Length: 3:59
- Label: Decca
- Songwriter: Parkinson
- Producer: Rowe / Ivor Raymonde

Neil Reid singles chronology
| "Mother of Mine" (1971) | "That's What I Want To Be" (1972) |

Music video
- "Mother of MIne" on YouTube

"Mother of Mine" is a song written by Bill Parkinson and made famous by a Scottish former child singing star Neil Reid, who sang it on ITV's Opportunity Knocks and won the competition on 13 December 1971, singing his version of the song.

The B-side for international releases was another track appearing in the album, "If I Could Write a Song".

The song was an instant hit with the British public and was released commercially by Decca Records shortly after his win, and went to number two on the UK Singles Chart, particularly following a performance of the song on Top of the Pops.

The "Mother of Mine" record sold over 250,000 copies in the United Kingdom, and over 2.5 million globally. It also sold around 400,000 copies in Japan alone.

The song also appeared on his self-titled album Neil Reid, reaching number 1 on the UK Albums Chart, and thus making Reid the holder of the title of the youngest person to reach number one on that chart. at the age of 12 years 9 months.

Reid followed up the single "Mother of Mine" by "That's What I Want To Be" three months later, but that song peaked at number 45, and Reid quickly faded from national prominence to performing on the Northern England Working men's club circuit.

Two years after winning Opportunity Knocks, Reid's voice broke and as a result he gave up professional singing.

== Charts ==
| Chart (1971–1972) | Peak Position |
|---|---|
| UK Singles Chart | 2 |

== Cover versions ==
- In 1972, following the success of the song, another young singer, Jimmy Osmond, recorded it as the B-side of his hit "Long Haired Lover from Liverpool". The song was also included on Osmond's 1972 album Killer Joe.
- Also in 1972, The Paul Mauriat Orchestra recorded an instrumental version that appeared on the album Summer Memories - The Superb Sounds of The Paul Mauriat Orchestra.
