= 1972 in British television =

This is a list of British television related events from 1972.

== Events ==
=== January ===
- 19 January – The government of Edward Heath announces the lifting of all restrictions on broadcasting hours on television and radio.
- 30 January – Bob Monkhouse ends his first run as host of ATV's The Golden Shot after being dismissed for allegedly taking bribes for product placement. He is initially replaced by Norman Vaughan.

=== February ===
- 14 February – The children's show Fingerbobs is first shown on BBC1, as part of Watch with Mother. Although only thirteen episodes are produced, it would be regularly repeated on the BBC until late 1984.

=== March ===
- 1 March – Border begins broadcasting in colour from the Selkirk transmitter.
- 25 March – The 17th Eurovision Song Contest is held at the Usher Hall in Edinburgh. Luxembourg wins the contest with the song "Après toi", performed by Vicky Leandros. The British entry, "Beg, Steal or Borrow" by The New Seekers, ends in second place.
- 27 March – For the first time, BBC1 broadcasts children's programmes on weekday mornings during the school holidays. The block, which runs for just over one hour, ends at 11am, which is the start time for Play School on BBC2.

=== April ===
- 4 April
  - BBC1 launches the children's news programme Newsround, with presenter John Craven, who would host it until 1989.
  - After a three-year courtship, Emily Nugent marries Ernest Bishop on Coronation Street.
- 14 April – Hosted by Chris Kelly, Clapperboard, the cinema themed children's programme makes its debut on ITV.
- 18 April – ITV Anglia begins showing the first series (following two previous television movies) of the American detective series Columbo, starring Peter Falk as the titular "Lieutenant Frank Columbo" in the episode "Murder by the Book". Other ITV regions commence broadcasting the series shortly after.

=== June ===
- 1 June
  - "Light and Tuneful" becomes the new opening theme tune for the BBC's coverage of the Wimbledon Tennis Championships.
  - BBC1 screens the Play for Today episode "The Fishing Party", starring Brian Glover.
- 9 June – ITV Midlands shows the 1958 Hammer horror film Dracula ahead of other ITV regions.
- 14–18 June – ITV covers the finals of football's UEFA European Championship for the first time.

=== July ===
- 8 July – Granada broadcasts Sesame Street for the first time.
- 24 July – The Independent Television Authority (ITA) is renamed the Independent Broadcasting Authority (IBA).

=== August ===
- 25 August – ITV Midlands shows the 1957 Hammer horror film The Curse of Frankenstein ahead of other ITV regions; it stars Peter Cushing and Christopher Lee.
- 26 August–11 September – The BBC and ITV broadcast full coverage of the 1972 Summer Olympic Games, with the BBC providing approximately eight hours a day of live coverage each day.

=== September ===
- 8 September – The pilot episode of department store-based comedy series Are You Being Served? is shown on BBC1. It becomes one of the longest-running BBC comedy shows, and goes on to spawn a 1977 British feature film, and the spin-off series Grace & Favour, which begins in 1992.
- 11 September
  - The quiz show Mastermind airs for the first time on BBC1, hosted by Magnus Magnusson.
  - Nationwide starts broadcasting five days a week. Previously, it has been broadcast only on Tuesdays and Thursdays.
  - After eight years of episodes being shown different days at various ITV regions, Crossroads finally gets broadcast across the network with Granada Television showing it for the first time. The series is still being shown at different times across the regions.
- 17 September – The family adventure series The Adventures of Black Beauty is broadcast on ITV.

=== October ===
- 1 October – London Weekend Television launches the first British Sunday politics programme Weekend World. It runs until 1988.
- 2 October – Following the lifting of restrictions on broadcasting hours, BBC1 and ITV are allowed to begin broadcasting during the day. BBC1's afternoon schedule launches with the first edition of a new lunchtime magazine programme Pebble Mill at One.
- 16 October – ITV launches its afternoon service. As part of the new service, the first episode of rural soap opera Emmerdale Farm is broadcast, produced by Yorkshire Television, and ITV's first lunchtime news programme, First Report, is shown. ITV Schools is now shown in a single morning block, between the hours of 9:30am and 12pm. In addition, the children's programme Rainbow, debuts as part of the new service. It features David Cook as the presenter, who would be then replaced by Geoffrey Hayes in 1974. The programme would run until 1992.
- 23 October – The BBC announces that development work has begun on the Ceefax teletext service.

=== November ===
- 4 November – Grandstand ends at approximately 3:50pm. It is followed by an episode of the 1969 Western series Lancer. Then, at approximately 4:40pm, Final Score airs as a separate programme, hosted by the same presenter as that of Grandstand earlier in the afternoon, the programme being on air in time for the vidiprinter sequence.
- 5 November – BBC2 begins showing the horror anthology series Dead of Night with the episode "The Exorcism".

=== December ===
- 15 December – The Roy Castle and Norris McWhirter-hosted children's television show featuring world record attempts, Record Breakers, makes its debut on BBC1. It would run until 2001.
- 25 December – BBC2 shows the supernatural drama The Stone Tape, starring Jane Asher.
- 26 December – BBC1 airs the network television premiere of the 1964 comedy film Carry On Cleo, starring Sid James, Kenneth Williams, Kenneth Connor, Charles Hawtrey, Jim Dale and Amanda Barrie.
- 30 December – The BBC airs part one of The Three Doctors, a four-part serial of the science-fiction programme Doctor Who created to celebrate its tenth series (the tenth anniversary would not be until 23 November of the following year).

=== Unknown ===
- The application of NICAM to broadcasting is first described in a BBC Research Report.
- The BBC Schools and Colleges service is converted to colour, and starts using the Diamond ident which stays until 1977.
- The UK's Minister for Posts and Telecommunications authorises five experimental community cable television channels.
- London Weekend Television opens its purpose-built studios called The London Studios, although they are not fully operational until 1974.

== Debuts ==
=== BBC1 ===
- 3 January – Mandog (1972)
- 6 January – The Brighton Belle (1972)
- 9 January – Engelbert with the Young Generation (1972)
- 13 January – The Adventures of Sir Prancelot (1972)
- 16 January – The Moonstone (1972)
- 3 February –Six with Rix (1972)
- 11 February – The Scobie Man (1972)
- 14 February – Fingerbobs (1972)
- 19 February – The Befrienders (1972)
- 20 February – Anne of Green Gables (1972)
- 21 February – The Regiment (1972–1973)
- 28 February – Crystal Tipps and Alistair (1972–1974)
- 10 March – The Brothers (1972–1976)
- 13 March – Spy Trap (1972–1975)
- 23 March – It's Murder But Is It Art? (1972)
- 4 April – Newsround (1972–present)
- 5 April – Lord Peter Wimsey (1972–1975)
- 9 April – Mistress of Hardwick (1972)
- 10 April – Tales from the Lazy Acre (1972)
- 12 May – The Man Outside (1972)
- 1 June – The Fishing Party (1972)
- 15 June – The Burke Special (1972–1976)
- 30 June – Cabbages and Kings (1972–1974)
- 10 July – Birds in the Bush (1972)
- 27 July – Them (1972)
- 16 August – No Exit (1972)
- 8 September – Are You Being Served? (1972–1985)
- 11 September – Mastermind (1972–present)
- 14 September – Sykes (1972–1979)
- 19 September – My Wife Next Door (1972)
- 25 September – The Long Chase (1972)
- 2 October – Pebble Mill at One (1972–1986, 1991–1996)
- 8 October – The Hole in the Wall (1972)
- 19 October – Colditz (1972–1974)
- 16 November – The Film Programme (1972–present)
- 17 November – Jackanory Playhouse (1972–1985)
- 26 November – Cranford (1972)
- 15 December – Record Breakers (1972–2001)
- 27 December – Thursday's Child (1972–1973)

=== BBC2 ===
- 6 January – The Shadow of the Tower (1972)
- 8 January – Ways of Seeing (1972)
- 16 January – Up Sunday (1972–1973)
- 30 January – Man of Straw (1972)
- 18 February – Clochemerle (1972)
- 29 February – Walk into the Dark (1972)
- 21 April – Beyond a Joke (1972)
- 23 April – The Lotus Eaters (1972–1973)
- 4 May – The Golden Bowl (1972)
- 5 June – His Lordship Entertains (1972)
- 13 June – The Sextet (1972)
- 15 June – The Visitors (1972)
- 6 July – Shelley (1972)
- 20 July – Emma (1972)
- 31 August – Love and Mr Lewisham (1972)
- 15 September – Michael Bentine Time (1972)
- 24 September – Six Faces (1972)
- 28 September – War and Peace (1972–1973)
- 1 October – Milligan in... (1972–1973)
- 8 October – Scoop (1972)
- 5 November – Dead of Night (1972)
- 7 November – The Gangster Show: The Resistible Rise of Arturo Ui (1972)
- 12 November – America (1972–1973)
- 21 November – The Edwardians (1972–1973)
- 26 November – Grubstreet (1972–1973)
- 3 December – But Seriously, It's Sheila Hancock (1972)
- 25 December – The Stone Tape (1972)

=== ITV ===
- 2 January – The Intruder (1972)
- 3 January – The Challengers (1972)
- 8 January – Who Do You Do? (1972–1976)
- 19 January – Tightrope (1972)
- 21 January – Spyder's Web (1972)
- 23 January – Adam Smith (1972–1973)
- 14 February – Home and Away (1972)
- 15 February – Romany Jones (1972–1975)
- 19 February – Both Ends Meet (1972)
- 24 February – My Good Woman (1972–1974)
- 27 February – Pretenders (1972)
- 28 February – Hep Hep (1972)
- 7 March – Des (1972)
- 4 April – A Place in the Sun (1972)
- 7 April – Shirley's World (1972)
- 8 April – Funny You Should Say That (1972)
- 9 April – Doctor in Charge (1972–1973)
- 10 April
  - Pardon My Genie (1972–1973)
  - Six Days of Justice (1972–1975)
- 12 April – Late Night Theatre (1972–1974)
- 13 April – Love Thy Neighbour (1972–1976)
- 14 April – Clapperboard (1972–1982)
- 16 April – The Organization (1972)
- 18 April – Columbo (1968, 1971–1978)
- 19 April – Escape Into Night (1972)
- 22 April – New Scotland Yard (1972–1974)
- 8 May – The David Nixon Magic Show (1972–1977)
- 14 May – The Frighteners (1972)
- 20 May – The Train Now Standing (1972–1973)
- 31 May – Fly Into Danger (1972)
- 5 June – Alcock and Gander (1972)
- 2 July – Villains (1972)
- 7 July – In for a Penny (1972)
- 21 July – The Man from Haven (1972)
- 15 August – Whodunnit? (1972–1978)
- 18 August – Shut That Door! (1972–1973)
- 20 August – Country Matters (1972)
- 1 September – Holly (1972)
- 13 September – Van der Valk (1972–1973, 1977, 1991–1992, 2021–present)
- 17 September – The Adventures of Black Beauty (1972–1974)
- 27 September – The Pathfinders (1972–1973)
- 29 September
  - The Adventurer (1972–1973)
  - The Protectors (1972–1974)
  - The New Adventures of Madeline (1972–1981)
- 1 October – Weekend World (1972–1988)
- 2 October – The Stanley Baxter Picture Show (1972–1975)
- 11 October – Crown Court (1972–1984)
- 16 October – Emmerdale Farm (1972–present)
- 17 October – Harriet's Back in Town (1972–1973)
- 19 October – General Hospital (1972–1979)
- 21 October – Russell Harty Plus (1972–1977)
- 23 October – Spring & Autumn (1972–1976)
- 31 October – Thirty Minutes Worth (1972–1973)
- 7 November – The Strauss Family (1972)
- 12 November – Rainbow (1972–1991, 1994–1997)
- 17 November – Turnbull's Finest Half-Hour (1972)
- 18 November – The Reg Varney Revue (1972)
- 4 December – The Black Arrow (1972–1975)
- 6 December – Arthur of the Britons (1972–1973)
- 24 December – Joseph and the Amazing Technicolor Dreamcoat (1972)

== Television shows ==
=== Returning this year after a break of one year or longer ===
- Crackerjack (1955–1970, 1972–1984, 2020–2021)

== Continuing television shows ==
=== 1920s ===
- BBC Wimbledon (1927–1939, 1946–2019, 2021–present)

=== 1930s ===
- Trooping the Colour (1937–1939, 1946–2019, 2023–present)
- The Boat Race (1938–1939, 1946–2019, 2021–present)
- BBC Cricket (1939, 1946–1999, 2020–2024)

=== 1950s ===
- Come Dancing (1950–1998)
- Watch with Mother (1952–1975)
- The Good Old Days (1953–1983)
- Panorama (1953–present)
- Dixon of Dock Green (1955–1976)
- Opportunity Knocks (1956–1978, 1987–1990)
- This Week (1956–1978, 1986–1992)
- Armchair Theatre (1956–1974)
- What the Papers Say (1956–2008)
- The Sky at Night (1957–present)
- Blue Peter (1958–present)
- Grandstand (1958–2007)

=== 1960s ===
- Coronation Street (1960–present)
- Songs of Praise (1961–present)
- Steptoe and Son (1962–1965, 1970–1974)
- Z-Cars (1962–1978)
- Animal Magic (1962–1983)
- Doctor Who (1963–1989, 1996, 2005–present)
- World in Action (1963–1998)
- Top of the Pops (1964–2006)
- Match of the Day (1964–present)
- Crossroads (1964–1988, 2001–2003)
- Play School (1964–1988)
- Mr. and Mrs. (1965–1999)
- Call My Bluff (1965–2005)
- World of Sport (1965–1985)
- Jackanory (1965–1996, 2006)
- Sportsnight (1965–1997)
- It's a Knockout (1966–1982, 1999–2001)
- The Money Programme (1966–2010)
- The Golden Shot (1967–1975)
- Playhouse (1967–1982)
- Reksio (1967–1990)
- Father, Dear Father (1968–1973)
- Dad's Army (1968–1977)
- Magpie (1968–1980)
- The Morecambe & Wise Show (1968–1977, 1978–1983)
- The Big Match (1968–2002)
- On the Buses (1969–1973)
- Clangers (1969–1974)
- Monty Python's Flying Circus (1969–1974)
- Nationwide (1969–1983)
- Screen Test (1969–1984)

=== 1970s ===
- The Goodies (1970–1982)
- ...And Mother Makes Three (1971–1973)
- The Fenn Street Gang (1971–1973)
- Follyfoot (1971–1973)
- Upstairs, Downstairs (1971–1975, 2010–2012)
- Bless This House (1971–1976)
- The Onedin Line (1971–1980)
- Sale of the Century (1971–1983, 1989–1991, 1997)
- The Old Grey Whistle Test (1971–1987)
- The Two Ronnies (1971–1987, 1991, 1996, 2005)

== Ending this year ==
- Callan (1967–1972)
- Please Sir! (1968–1972)
- A Family at War (1970–1972)
- Doomwatch (1970–1972)
- Queenie's Castle (1970–1972)
- Mr Benn (1970–1972, 2005)
- A Class by Himself (1971–1972)
- Budgie (1971–1972)
- The Persuaders! (1971–1972)

== Births ==
- 4 January – Charlotte Hudson, English actress
- 9 January – Sarah Beeny, property developer and television presenter
- 12 January – Sid Owen, actor
- 15 January – Claudia Winkleman, television presenter
- 23 January
  - Harriet Scott, radio and television presenter
  - Lisa Snowdon, English fashion model, actress and television presenter
- 10 February – Helen Willetts, BBC weather presenter
- 19 February – Lisa Faulkner, actress
- 22 February – Jo Guest, glamour model and media personality
- 24 February – James Bachman, comedian, actor and writer
- 27 March – Ben Richards, actor (The Bill)
- 3 April – Catherine McCormack, English actress
- 22 April – Sarah Patterson, actress
- 28 April – Anita Anand, journalist and television presenter
- 3 May – Katya Adler, broadcast journalist
- 19 May – Amanda de Cadenet, television presenter, actress and photographer
- 20 May
  - Daisy McAndrew, journalist
  - Tina Hobley, actress
- 26 May – Patsy Palmer, actress and television presenter
- 4 June — Debra Stephenson, actress
- 7 July – Liza Walker, actress
- 19 July – Amanda Lamb, model and television presenter
- 7 August – Sarah Cawood, television presenter
- 9 September – Natasha Kaplinsky, newsreader
- 12 September – Gideon Emery, actor
- 24 September
  - Kate Fleetwood, actress
  - Finty Williams, actress
- 29 September – Robert Webb, comic actor
- 22 October – Saffron Burrows, actress and model
- 2 November – Samantha Womack, actress
- 6 November – Thandiwe Newton, actress
- 8 November – Ben Hull, actor
- 14 December – Miranda Hart, comic actress
- 18 December – Melissa Porter, television presenter
- 21 December – Gloria De Piero, broadcast political presenter and politician
- Unknown – Sarah Tansey, actress (Heartbeat)

== Deaths ==
- 22 September – Val Parnell, 80, television executive and presenter, previously theatrical impresario
- 16 October – Leo G. Carroll, 85, actor (The Man from U.N.C.L.E.)

== See also ==
- 1972 in British music
- 1972 in British radio
- 1972 in the United Kingdom
- List of British films of 1972
