= Whodunnit? (British game show) =

British TV game show (1972–1978)

- Genre: Game show
- Created by: Jeremy Lloyd; Lance Percival
- Written by: Jeremy Lloyd; Lance Percival
- Presented by: Shaw Taylor (1972: Pilot); Edward Woodward (1973); Jon Pertwee (1974-78)
- Theme music composer: Simon Park
- Country of origin: United Kingdom
- Original language: English
- No. of series: 6
- No. of episodes: 48

Production
- Running time: 35 minutes (pilot); 50 minutes (inc. adverts)
- Production company: Thames

Original release
- Network: ITV
- Release: 15 August 1972 – 26 June 1978

Related
- Whodunnit?

Whodunnit? is a British television game show that aired on ITV from 15 August 1972 to 26 June 1978. It was devised by Jeremy Lloyd and Lance Percival, and originally aired as a pilot with Shaw Taylor as host. It then became a full show, with the first series being hosted by Edward Woodward, before Jon Pertwee took over hosting duties from the second series until the show's end.

== Format ==
Each week it featured a short murder-mystery drama enacted in front of a panel of four celebrity guests who then had to establish who the murderer was. One week there was a smuggling mystery and no murder. The panel members could interview the remaining characters, with the proviso that only the guilty party or parties could lie. Each panellist could also request to see a short replay of one section of the initial drama, which would often include events as they occurred and flashbacks as seen and narrated by individual suspects. For series 1, the entire audience also took part in guessing who was guilty (with the winner winning a prop from the set). For series 2 and 3, four members of the audience formed a panel, but did not question the suspects, with the winner taking away a 'Whodunnit?' trophy (a magnifying glass in a frame). For series 4 and 5, the audience panel was dropped and a TV Times competition winner formed part of the main panel (taking away a prop from the set if they won the game). For series 6, they were dropped entirely. At the end the compere would reveal the guilty (usually a murderer) with the catchphrase "would the real 'Whodunnit' please stand up?". Whodunnit? originally adopted a conventional panel-game studio layout, for series 2 some episodes would use the murder scene for the panel part of the show, with this being fully adopted for series 3 onwards.

== Transmissions ==
Series	Start date	End date	Episodes
Pilot	15 August 1972		1
1	25 June 1973	30 July 1973	6
2	24 June 1974	29 July 1974	6
Special	26 December 1974		1
3	14 July 1975	15 September 1975	10
4	28 June 1976	9 August 1976	7
5	27 June 1977	25 July 1977	5
6	3 April 1978	26 June 1978	12

== Episode guide ==
=== Pilot (1972) ===
No. overall	No. in series	Title	Celebrity panellists	Original release date
1	-	"Pilot"	Edward Woodward, Frank Windsor, Anne Summer	15 August 1972

=== Series 1 (1973) ===
No. overall	No. in series	Title	Celebrity panellists	Original release date
2	1	"Missing on Voyage"	Dick Francis, Frank Davies, Julie Ege, Kenneth Haigh	25 June 1973
3	2	"Knife in the Back"	Shaw Taylor, Reginald Bosanquet, Daliah Lavi, Jon Pertwee	2 July 1973
4	3	"Crime After a Fashion"	George Sewell, David Hemmings, Sally Geeson, Joe Lynch	9 July 1973
5	4	"Did He Fall or Was He Pushed?"	Peter Byrne, Moira Lister, Kingsley Amis, Russell Hunter	16 July 1973
6	5	"Dead Likeness"	Alfred Marks, Dulcie Gray, Michael Denison, Marius Goring	23 July 1973
7	6	"Happy New Year"	Patrick Mower, Barbara Windsor, John Woodvine, Tom Tullett	30 July 1973

=== Series 2 (1974) ===
No. overall	No. in series	Title	Celebrity panellists	Original release date
8	1	"The Last Act"	Patrick Mower, Margaret Lockwood, Anthony Valentine, Robin Nedwell	24 June 1974
9	2	"It's Quicker by Train"	Harry H. Corbett, Sheila Hancock, Leslie Crowther, Richard O'Sullivan	1 July 1974
10	3	"The Final Chapter"	Jimmy Jewel, Aimi Macdonald, Francis Matthews, Henry Cooper	8 July 1974
11	4	"Goodbye Sarge"	Rodney Bewes, Billie Whitelaw, George Sewell, Reginald Bosanquet	15 July 1974
12	5	"The Art of Theft"	Kingsley Amis, Jackie Collins, Arthur Mullard, Pete Murray	22 July 1974
13	6	"Teddy Bears' Picnic"	Hughie Green, Alfred Marks, Dawn Addams, Jackie Pallo	29 July 1974

=== Christmas Special (1974) ===
No. overall	No. in series	Title	Celebrity panellists	Original release date
14	-	"A Piece of Cake"	Patrick Mower, Wendy Craig, Derek Nimmo, Leslie Crowther	26 December 1974

=== Series 3 (1975) ===
No. overall	No. in series	Title	Celebrity panellists	Original release date
15	1	"Portrait in Black"	Jackie Collins, Norman Bowler, Anouska Hempel, Patrick Mower	14 July 1975
16	2	"Final Drive"	Aimi Macdonald, Alfred Marks, Anouska Hempel, Patrick Mower	21 July 1975
17	3	"Pop Goes The Weasel"	Paula Wilcox, Richard O'Sullivan, Anouska Hempel, Patrick Mower	28 July 1975
18	4	"Evidence of Death"	Polly James, Magnus Pyke, Anouska Hempel, Patrick Mower	4 August 1975
19	5	"Nothing to Declare"	Nina Baden-Semper, Jack Smethurst, Anouska Hempel, Patrick Mower	11 August 1975
20	6	"Death at the Top"	Diana Dors, William Franklyn, Anouska Hempel, Patrick Mower	18 August 1975
21	7	"Too Many Cooks"	Julie Ege, Rodney Bewes, Anouska Hempel, Patrick Mower	25 August 1975
22	8	"Worth Dying For"	Terry Scott, Dilys Laye, Anouska Hempel, Patrick Mower	1 September 1975
23	9	"Fly Me, I'm Dead"	Honor Blackman, Leslie Crowther, Nerys Hughes, Patrick Mower	8 September 1975
24	10	"Beware - Wet Paint"	Rosemary Leach, Jimmy Jewel, Anouska Hempel, Patrick Mower	15 September 1975

=== Series 4 (1976) ===
No. overall	No. in series	Title	Celebrity panellists	Original release date
25	1	"Dead Grass"	Stratford Johns, Sheila Hancock, George Savalas	28 June 1976
26	2	"Future Imperfect"	Magnus Pyke, Lindsay Wagner, Patrick Mower	5 July 1976
27	3	"A Time to Dye"	Anouska Hempel, Terry Scott, Gareth Hunt	12 July 1976
28	4	"Final Verdict"	Richard O'Sullivan, Honor Blackman, Norman Bowler	19 July 1976
29	5	"A Bad Habit"	Robin Nedwell, Yootha Joyce, Brian Murphy	26 July 1976
30	6	"A Deadly Tan"	June Whitfield, Rodney Bewes, Tony Selby	2 August 1976
31	7	"Dead Ball"	William Franklyn, Sandra Dickinson, Gordon Honeycombe	9 August 1976

=== Series 5 (1977) ===
No. overall	No. in series	Title	Celebrity panellists	Original release date
32	1	"The Rajah's Ruby"	Terry Wogan, Prunella Scales, Bill Pertwee	27 June 1977
33	2	"Village Fete"	Jimmy Jewel, Liza Goddard, Trevor Bannister	4 July 1977
34	3	"No Happy Returns"	Alfred Marks, Patrick Mower, Kate Williams	11 July 1977
35	4	"The Q43 Experiment"	Magnus Pyke, Tessa Wyatt, Michael Aspel	18 July 1977
36	5	"Last Tango in Tooting"	Anouska Hempel, Patrick Mower, Roy Plomley	25 July 1977

=== Series 6 (1978) ===
No. overall	No. in series	Title	Celebrity panellists	Original release date
37	1	"All Part of the Service"	Patrick Mower, Liza Goddard, Diana Coupland, Alfred Marks	3 April 1978
38	2	"Which Eye, Jack?"	Patrick Mower, Liza Goddard, Joanna Lumley, Bill Maynard	10 April 1978
39	3	"Diamonds Are Almost Forever"	Patrick Mower, Liza Goddard, June Whitfield, Alfred Marks	17 April 1978
40	4	"Before Your Very Eyes"	Patrick Mower, Liza Goddard, Mollie Sugden, Roy Plomley	24 April 1978
41	5	"A Bad Sign"	Patrick Mower, Liza Goddard, Nerys Hughes, Reginald Bosanquet	1 May 1978
42	6	"Adieu Monsieur Chips"	Patrick Mower, Lynsey de Paul, Liza Goddard, Bill Maynard	8 May 1978
43	7	"A Safe Way to Die"	Patrick Mower, Jenny Hanley, Liza Goddard, Rodney Bewes	15 May 1978
44	8	"Final Trumpet"	Patrick Mower, Una Stubbs, Liza Goddard, Robin Nedwell	22 May 1978
45	9	"Instant Coffee"	Anouska Hempel, Michael Holoway, Anna Dawson, Jimmy Jewel	5 June 1978
46	10	"A Dead Cert"	Katie Boyle, Victor Spinetti, Anna Dawson, Cardew Robinson	12 June 1978
47	11	"Underneath the Archers"	Ted Moult, Anna Dawson, Magnus Pyke, Janet Brown	19 June 1978
48	12	"Which Way Did He Go?"	Cardew Robinson, Anna Dawson, David Nixon, Joyce Blair	26 June 1978

== DVD releases ==
All six series of Whodunnit? have been released on DVD by Network.

DVD title	Discs	Year	Episodes	Release date
Complete Series 1	2	1972-1973	6 (+ pilot)	31 January 2011
Complete Series 2	2	1974	6	13 August 2012
Complete Series 3	3	1974-1975	10 (+ special)	4 June 2012
Complete Series 4	2	1976	7	25 March 2013
Complete Series 5	1	1977	5	27 April 2015
Complete Series 6	3	1978	12	20 November 2017
The Complete Series	13	1972-1978	48	20 November 2017
