= Neil Reid =

- Born: 1959 (age 66–67)
- Origin: Glasgow, Scotland
- Instruments: Guitar, vocals
- Years active: 1968–1974
- Label: Decca

Neil Reid (born 1959) is a Scottish former child singing star, winner of ITV's Opportunity Knocks, and the youngest person to reach number one on the UK Albums Chart.

== Career ==
Known also as "Wee Neil Reid", he was eight when he was discovered singing at a pensioners' party in 1968. Reid won Opportunity Knocks on 13 December 1971 singing his version of "Mother of Mine", which, when released commercially by Decca Records shortly afterwards, went to number two on the UK Singles Chart following a performance on Top of the Pops. The "Mother of Mine" record sold over 250,000 copies in the United Kingdom, and over 2.5 million globally. It also sold around 400,000 copies in Japan alone, reaching number 3 in the Oricon charts, and spending 10 weeks on top of the Import Singles chart.

Reid's self-titled album went to number one in 1972, making Reid the youngest person to reach number one on the UK Albums Chart, at the age of 12 years 9 months. This remains one of the very few Number 1 selling albums that has never had an official CD release and as such is unavailable in this format.

Reid's follow-up single three months later "That's What I Want To Be" peaked at number 45, and Reid quickly faded from national prominence to performing on the Northern England Working men's club circuit. Two years after winning Opportunity Knocks, Reid's voice broke and as a result he gave up professional singing. He did a final round of concerts in 1974 in South Africa, where he toured with the Irish pop group The Bachelors. Reid's 1974 single (his last recording), "Hazel Eyes", was released in South Africa to coincide with the tour.

After leaving show business, Reid became an independent financial adviser and a management consultant. In 2008 he was interviewed by Amanda Holden about his child stardom for ITV1's When Britain First Had Talent in January 2008. In 2024 he took part in the BBC documentary Lena Zavaroni: The Forgotten Child Star.

== Discography ==
=== Albums ===
Album and details	Peak positions
Album and details	UK
Neil Reid: Released: 1972; Record label: Decca	1
Smile: Released: 1972; Record label: Decca	Track list: 1. Smile; 2. The Wishing Tree; 3. Over The Rainbow; 4. Glory of Scotland; 5. Bless This House; 6. You Must Have Been a Beautiful Baby; 7. If Wishes Were Ships; 8. Side By Side; 9. Blue Star; 10. Walkin' My Baby Back Home; 11. Sailboat; 12. For Me & My Gal; 13. The Road & The Miles to Dundee; 14. With a Little Love; 15. The Sunshine of Your Smile; 16. When You're Smiling

=== Singles ===
Year	Single	Peak positions	Album
Year	Single	UK	Album
1971	"Mother of Mine"	2	Neil Reid
1972	"That's What I Want to Be"	45	Neil Reid
