= 1972 in the United Kingdom =

Events from the year 1972 in the United Kingdom.

== Incumbents ==
- Monarch – Elizabeth II
- Prime Minister – Edward Heath (Conservative)

== Events ==
=== January ===
- 1 January – The Greenwich Time Signal broadcast on BBC radio now records Coordinated Universal Time and the sixth pip is extended to 0.5 s duration.
- 4 January – Rose Heilbron becomes the first female judge to sit at the Old Bailey.
- 9 January – The National Union of Mineworkers holds a strike ballot in which 58.8% vote in favour of industrial action. Coal miners begin a strike which will last for seven weeks, including picketing of Saltley coke depot in Birmingham.
- 19 January – The government announces the lifting of all restrictions on broadcasting hours on television and radio. Daytime television hours will be extended in October.
- 20 January – Unemployment exceeds the 1,000,000 mark for the first time since the 1930s, almost double the 582,000 who were unemployed when Edward Heath's Conservative government came to power less than two years ago.
- 30 January – 'Bloody Sunday' in Northern Ireland: fourteen Catholics are killed when troops open fire on unarmed demonstrators in Derry.

=== February ===
- 2 February – Burning of the British Embassy in Dublin: Anti-British riots take place throughout Ireland. The Embassy of the United Kingdom in Merrion Square, Dublin, is burned to the ground, as are several British-owned businesses. In West Berlin, a bomb planted in sympathy with the Provisional IRA at the British Yacht Club explodes fatally.
- 3–13 February – Great Britain and Northern Ireland compete at the Winter Olympics in Sapporo, Japan, but do not win any medals.
- 5 February – 91 people are hurt and 122 arrested as mounted police charge protestors in London.
- 9 February – A state of emergency is declared by the Prime Minister as a result of the miners' strike.
- 10 February – David Bowie introduces his Ziggy Stardust persona at the second show of the 1972–73 Ziggy Stardust Tour, at The Toby Jug pub, Tolworth, Surrey.
- 22 February – 1972 Aldershot bombing: An Official Irish Republican Army car bomb kills six people at Aldershot Barracks.
- 25 February – The miners' strike ends after seven weeks.

=== March ===
- 13 March – The United Kingdom and the People's Republic of China elevate diplomatic exchanges to the ambassadorial level after 22 years.
- 21 March – Chancellor Anthony Barber announces a £1,200,000,000 tax reduction in the Budget.
- 24 March – The British government announces the prorogation of the Parliament of Northern Ireland and the introduction of Direct rule over Northern Ireland, after the Unionist government refuses to cede security powers.
- 26 March – The UK's last trolleybus system, in Bradford, is closed.
- 30 March – The Troubles: The Parliament of Northern Ireland is suspended.
- 31 March – A CND demonstration is held protesting against the nuclear base at Aldermaston.

=== April ===
- 1 April – William Whitelaw is appointed as the first Northern Ireland Secretary.
- 4 April – First broadcast of the long-running BBC Television children's programme Newsround.
- 6 April – As announced in March, Ford launches its new executive model, the Granada, available as a saloon, coupé or estate, which replaces the Zephyr on the UK market and will be produced at the Dagenham plant as well as Ford's Cologne plant in West Germany. It is designed to compete with the likes of the Rover P6 and Vauxhall Victor and will also be sold as the Ford Consul in mainland Europe.
- 11 April – The BBC Radio 4 parodic panel show I'm Sorry I Haven't a Clue is broadcast for the first time.
- 19 April – A report into the Bloody Sunday shootings by the Lord Chief Justice, Lord Widgery, exonerates the British troops of blame because the demonstration had been illegal. This report will be completely discredited by the Saville Inquiry published on 15 June 2010, on which day the British prime minister David Cameron will acknowledge in the House of Commons, among other things, that the paratroopers had fired the first shot, had fired on fleeing unarmed civilians, and shot and killed one man who was already wounded; he will then apologise on behalf of the British Government.
- 22 April – Sylvia Cook and John Fairfax finish rowing across the Pacific.
- 30 April – The Brighton Belle Pullman car train makes its final journey from London to Brighton.

=== May ===
- 3 May
  - In the first UEFA Cup final, Tottenham Hotspur beat Wolverhampton Wanderers 2–1 in the first leg at the Molineux.
  - The General Synod of the Church of England fails to agree union with the Methodist Church.
- 6 May – Leeds United wins the FA Cup for the first time with a 1–0 win over last year's winners Arsenal at Wembley Stadium. The only goal is a header by Allan Clarke from a Mick Jones pass.
- 8 May – Derby County wins the Football League First Division title for the first time in their history.
- 12 May – The Crown Court is established by the Courts Act 1971 to replace the courts of Assize and Quarter Sessions in England and Wales. Property qualifications requiring jurors to be householders are abolished.
- 17 May – Tottenham Hotspur complete a 3–2 aggregate win over Wolverhampton Wanderers at White Hart Lane to win the first UEFA Cup.
- 18 May
  - Queen Elizabeth II meets her uncle, Prince Edward, Duke of Windsor for the last time, at his home in Paris.
  - Four troopers of the Special Air Service and Special Boat Service are parachuted onto the ocean liner Queen Elizabeth 2 1,000 miles (1,600 km) across the Atlantic after a bomb threat and a ransom demand which turn out to be false.
- 22 May
  - The Dominion of Ceylon becomes the Republic of Sri Lanka.
  - The Poet Laureate Cecil Day-Lewis dies of cancer aged 68 at Lemmons, the home near London he has been sharing with Kingsley Amis's family.
- 24 May
  - The final stretch of the M6 motorway opens between junctions 6 (Spaghetti Junction) and 7 north of Birmingham, with the fully operational motorway stretching more than 200 miles from Rugby to Carlisle, more than a decade after the first sections were opened.
  - Glasgow team Rangers F.C. win the UEFA Cup Winners' Cup, defeating FC Dynamo Moscow 3–2 in the final at Camp Nou in Barcelona. A pitch invasion by their supporters leads to the team being banned from defending the trophy the following season.
- 26 May – The state-owned travel agency Thomas Cook & Son is privatised.
- 28 May – Prince Edward, Duke of Windsor, dies of cancer at his home in France aged 77, 35 years after his abdication from the throne.
- 30 May
  - The Official Irish Republican Army declares a ceasefire in Northern Ireland.
  - Battersea Park funfair disaster: Five children die and 13 are injured when a haulage rope on the Big Dipper roller coaster snaps, causing a car to roll backwards and crash.
  - The Angry Brigade, a far-left militant group that has carried out small bomb attacks in England between 1970 and 1972, go on trial. Four of the "Stoke Newington Eight" will be convicted on 6 December.

=== June ===
- 1 June – Hotels and boarding houses become required to obtain certification under the Fire Precautions Act 1971.
- 3 June – A Protestant demonstration in Derry turns into a battle.
- 5 June – The funeral of The Duke of Windsor (formerly King Edward VIII) is held at Windsor Castle.
- 11 June – Eltham Well Hall rail crash: an excursion train travelling from Margate to London derails near Eltham station in outer London (then called Eltham Well Hall), and five passengers and the train driver, Robert Wilsdon, are killed.
- 18 June – British European Airways Flight 548 crashes near Staines and 118 people are killed, making it the UK's worst air disaster at this date. The only two survivors both die by the time they reach a hospital.
- 23 June – The Chancellor of the Exchequer Anthony Barber announces a decision for the pound sterling to move to a floating exchange rate. Although intended to be temporary, this remains permanent. Foreign exchange controls are applied to most members of the sterling area.

=== July ===
- 1 July – The first official gay pride march in London is held.
- 7 July – A Provisional IRA delegation led by Seán Mac Stíofáin meets secretly regarding The Troubles with members of the British government, led by Secretary of State for Northern Ireland William Whitelaw, in London, but without an outcome.
- 21 July – Bloody Friday: Nine people die and over a hundred are injured in a series of IRA explosions in Belfast city centre.
- 28 July – A strike by thousands of dockers, leading to the government announcing a state of emergency on 4 August, the last such declaration (as of 2022).
- 31 July – The Troubles in Northern Ireland:
  - Operation Motorman, 4:00 AM: British Army begins to regain control of the "no-go areas" established by Irish republican paramilitaries in Belfast, Derry ("Free Derry") and Newry.
  - Claudy bombing ("Bloody Monday"), 10:00 AM: Three car bombs in Claudy, County Londonderry, kill nine people. It becomes public knowledge only in 2010 that a local Catholic priest was an IRA officer believed to be involved in the bombings but his role was covered up by the authorities.

=== August ===
- 6 August – Expulsion of Asians from Uganda: Idi Amin, dictator of Uganda, announces that 50,000 Asians with British passports will be expelled from Uganda to the United Kingdom within the next three months as they have been (according to him) "sabotaging the Ugandan economy".
- 9 August – The Tim Rice and Andrew Lloyd Webber musical Jesus Christ Superstar makes its West End debut.
- 26 August–10 September – Great Britain and Northern Ireland compete at the Olympics in Munich, West Germany, and win 4 gold, 5 silver and 9 bronze medals.
- 28 August – Prince William of Gloucester, a cousin of the Queen, is killed in an air crash near Wolverhampton. He is thirty years old, a bachelor and ninth in line to the British throne at this time. This means that Prince Richard, the Duke of Gloucester's only other son, automatically becomes heir to the dukedom.

=== September ===
- 1 September – Raising of school leaving age in England and Wales from fifteen to sixteen for pupils leaving school at the end of the academic year begins. Many temporary new buildings are erected in secondary modern and comprehensive schools to accommodate the older pupils, while some authorities raise the secondary school transfer age from 11 to 12 or 13. The age is also raised in Scotland and Northern Ireland.
- 6 September - National Building industrial action.
- 11 September – The BBC1 television quiz programme Mastermind is broadcast for the first time.
- 12 September – The sinking of two British trawlers by an Icelandic gunboat triggers the second Cod War.
- 13 September – Hypermarkets make their debut in the United Kingdom some twenty years after their appearance in France, when French retail giant Carrefour opens one in Caerphilly, South Wales.
- 14 September – Pimlico tube station, the final station of London Underground's Victoria line, and the only one served by that line only, is opened by the Lord Mayor of Westminster.
- 18 September – Thousands of Ugandan Asians arrive in the UK after being deported by Idi Amin.
- 19 September – A parcel bomb kills a diplomat at the Israeli embassy in London. It is one of 8 such bombs delivered to diplomats, the others being discovered in time to avoid injury.

=== October ===
- Three previously all-male Colleges of the University of Cambridge begin admitting female undergraduates.
- 2 October – Following January's lifting of restrictions on broadcasting hours, daytime television is extended. BBC1's afternoon schedule launches with the first edition of a new lunchtime magazine programme Pebble Mill at One from its Birmingham studios.
- 5 October – United Reformed Church is formed by merger of most of the Congregational Church of England and Wales with the Presbyterian Church of England.
- 10 October – Sir John Betjeman's appointment as Poet Laureate in succession to Cecil Day-Lewis is announced.
- 13 October – Bank rates are abolished and replaced with the Minimum Lending Rate.
- 16 October
  - As part of ITV's new afternoon service, the first episode of Emmerdale Farm, a soap opera set in rural Yorkshire, is broadcast on ITV produced by Yorkshire Television.
  - Rioting Maze Prison inmates in Northern Ireland cause a fire that destroys most of the camp.
- 17 October – Elizabeth II visits the Socialist Federal Republic of Yugoslavia.
- 19 October – Royce Ryton's play about the Abdication Crisis of Edward VIII, Crown Matrimonial, premieres at the Theatre Royal, Haymarket, London, for the first time including the portrayal of a living member of the Royal Family (Queen Elizabeth the Queen Mother as the Duchess of York) on the legitimate stage.
- 22 October – Gordon Banks, the England national football team goalkeeper, suffers a serious eye injury in a car crash in Staffordshire.
- 23 October – Access credit cards are introduced.

=== November ===
- 6 November – The Government introduces freezes on pay, prices, dividends and rents to counter inflation.
- 18 November – England women's national football team plays its first official association football match, against Scotland in Greenock, 100 years after the equivalent men's match.
- 30 November – Cod War: British Foreign Secretary Sir Alec Douglas-Home says that Royal Navy ships will be stationed to protect British trawlers off Iceland.
- November – Formation in Coventry of the PEOPLE Party, predecessor of the Green Party and the first political party in Europe to promote Green politics.

=== December ===
- 7 December – Murder of Jean McConville: Provisional Irish Republican Army volunteers, including women, take a recently widowed mother-of-10, who they claim to be an informer, in Belfast at gunpoint. She is shot in the head and buried secretly across the Irish border. There is no police investigation of the crime until 1995.
- 10 December
  - John Hicks is awarded the Nobel Memorial Prize in Economic Sciences with Kenneth Arrow for "pioneering contributions to general economic equilibrium theory and welfare theory."
  - Rodney Robert Porter is awarded the Nobel Prize in Physiology or Medicine jointly with Gerald Edelman "for their discoveries concerning the chemical structure of antibodies".
- December – White Paper Education: A Framework for Expansion is published by Margaret Thatcher, Secretary of State for Education, announcing planned increases in nursery provision and of polytechnics and other higher and further education institutions.

=== Undated ===
- Inflation falls slightly during the year to 6.4% from 8.6%.
- Marriage rates peak.
- British car production peaks at more than 1,900,000 units, despite regular strikes and increasing competition from overseas.
- Honda, the Japanese manufacturer whose motorcycles are already popular with British buyers, begins importing passenger cars to the United Kingdom, beginning only with its recently launched small Civic hatchback, one of the first medium-sized cars sold in Europe to feature this bodystyle which competes with similar sized saloons including the Ford Escort. A larger hatchback and saloon model is due within the next four years to compete with the likes of the Ford Cortina.
- Japanese carmaker Nissan enjoys a surge in sales of its Datsun badged cars, with more than 30,000 cars sold in Britain this year compared to less than 7,000 in 1971. Popularity of imported Japanese products from Mazda and Toyota is also rising.
- Aardman Animations is founded.
- The United Kingdom begins to train the Special Air Service for anti-terrorist duties in response to the Munich massacre.

== Publications ==
- Richard Adams novel Watership Down.
- John Berger's novel G.
- Agatha Christie's Hercule Poirot novel Elephants Can Remember.
- Archie Cochrane's Effectiveness and Efficiency: Random Reflections on Health Services, drawing attention to collective ignorance about the outcomes of health care.
- John Yudkin's book on the dangers of sugar in the diet Pure, White and Deadly.
- A Blueprint for Survival first published as a special edition of The Ecologist magazine (January).

== Births ==
=== January–March ===
- 5 January – Philip Davies, politician
- 15 January – Claudia Winkleman, TV presenter
- 23 January – Gavin Barwell, politician
- 23 January - Lisa Snowdon, English television & radio presenter and fashion model
- 27 January
  - Wynne Evans, Welsh operatic tenor
  - Mark Owen, pop singer (Take That)
- 9 February – Darren Ferguson, Scottish-born footballer and manager
- 11 February – Steve McManaman, footballer
- 16 February – Vicki Butler-Henderson, motoring journalist (Auto Express, What Car?), TV presenter (Fifth Gear) and racing driver
- 19 February – Malky Mackay, footballer
- 20 February – Gareth Unwin, film producer
- 22 February – Keir Simmons, journalist
- 6 March – Terry Murphy, snooker player
- 20 March – Alex Kapranos, rock singer and guitarist (Franz Ferdinand)
- 24 March – Charlie Creed-Miles, actor
- 28 March – Nick Frost, actor
- 29 March – Priti Patel, politician

=== April–June ===
- 3 April – Catherine McCormack, actress
- 7 April – Tim Peake, astronaut
- 10 April – Gordon Buchanan, wildlife cameraman and presenter
- 16 April – John McGuinness, motorcycle racer
- 17 April – Vicky Lupton, English racewalker
- 21 April – Liz Carr, actress and disability rights activist
- 22 April – Sarah Patterson, actress
- 1 May – Patrick Grant, fashion designer and broadcaster
- 2 May – Paul Adcock, footballer
- 3 May
  - Katya Adler, broadcast journalist
  - Steve Barclay, politician
- 5 May – James Cracknell, Olympic winning rower
- 8 May - Dino Bardot, guitarist (Franz Ferdinand, The Yummy Fur)
- 9 May – Martin Lewis, financial journalist and broadcaster
- 15 May – Richard Blackwood, comedian, actor and rapper
- 23 May – Martin Saggers, cricketer and umpire
- 27 May – Maggie O'Farrell, Northern Irish novelist
- 31 May – Archie Panjabi, screen actress
- 1 June – Daniel Casey, actor
- 3 June – Steve Crane, footballer
- 4 June – Debra Stephenson, actress
- 7 June – Curtis Robb, athlete
- 27 June – Marc Iliffe, strongman (died 2003)
- 30 June – James Martin, chef

=== July–September ===
- 1 July – Christopher Smith, film director and screenwriter
- 6 July – Mark Gasser, concert pianist
- 10 July – Peter Serafinowicz, actor, voice actor, comedian and writer
- 12 July – Jake Wood, actor
- 19 July – David Lammy, politician
- 21 July
  - Justin Edwards, actor and writer
  - Simon Reeve, television presenter
- 6 August
  - Darren Eales, footballer and lawyer
  - Geri Halliwell, singer (Spice Girls)
- 7 August – Sarah Cawood, television presenter
- 10 August – Lawrence Dallaglio, rugby union player
- 15 August – Jonathan Slinger, actor
- 16 August – Frankie Boyle, Scottish comedian and writer
- 17 August – David Ralph, Scottish field hockey forward
- 18 August – Victoria Coren Mitchell, writer, presenter and champion poker player
- 27 August – Denise Lewis, athlete and sports presenter
- 6 September
  - Idris Elba, actor
  - Martin Gooch, filmmaker
- 9 September – Natasha Kaplinsky, newsreader
- 15 September – Jimmy Carr, comedian
- 18 September – David Jefferies, motorcycle racer (died 2003)
- 21 September
  - Liam Gallagher, singer (Oasis)
  - Richard Maden, breaststroke swimmer
- 24 September – Conor Burns, politician
- 29 September – Robert Webb, comic actor

=== October–December ===
- 20 October – Debbie McLeod, Scottish field hockey goalkeeper
- 27 October – Lee Clark, English footballer
- 2 November – Samantha Janus, actress
- 7 November – Danny Grewcock, rugby player
- 7 November – Marcus Stewart, English footballer
- 6 November – Thandiwe Newton, actress
- 30 November – Dan Jarvis, army officer and politician
- 6 December – Ewan Birney, scientist
- 12 December – Nicky Eaden, English footballer and coach
- 14 December
  - Miranda Hart, actress, comedian
  - Jonathan Slinger, actor
- 20 December – Sarah Jones, politician
- 21 December – Gloria De Piero, English journalist and politician, Shadow Minister for Women and Equalities
- 29 December – Jude Law, actor

== Deaths ==
=== January–March ===
- 19 February – John Grierson, documentary film maker (born 1898)
- 25 February – S. O. Davies, Welsh miner, trade union official and politician (born 1883 or 1886)
- 29 February – Violet Trefusis, writer and socialite (born 1894)
- 13 March – Tony Ray-Jones, photographer (born 1941)
- 21 March – David McCallum Sr., violinist and the father of David McCallum (born 1897)
- 29 March – J. Arthur Rank, industrialist and film producer (born 1888)

=== April–June ===
- 11 May – E. V. Rieu, poet and editor (born 1887)
- 22 May
  - Cecil Day-Lewis, poet (born 1904)
  - Margaret Rutherford, actress (born 1892)
- 28 May – The Duke of Windsor (formerly Edward VIII, born 1894)

=== July–September ===
- 26 August – Francis Chichester, aviator and sailor (born 1901)
- 28 August – Prince William of Gloucester (air crash) (born 1941)
- 15 September – Geoffrey Fisher, Archbishop of Canterbury (born 1887)
- 22 September – Val Parnell, theatrical impresario and television executive (born 1892)

=== October–December ===
- 1 October – Louis Leakey, palaeontologist (born 1903)
- 2 October – Syd Puddefoot, footballer (born 1894)
- 15 October – Douglas Smith, broadcaster (born 1924)
- 13 November – Arnold Strode-Jackson, Olympic middle-distance runner, British Army officer and lawyer (born 1891)
- 28 November – Havergal Brian, composer (born 1876)
- 30 November – Sir Compton Mackenzie, novelist and Scottish nationalist (born 1883)
- 6 December – Janet Munro, actress (born 1934)
- 13 December – L. P. Hartley, fiction writer (born 1895)
- 24 December – Gisela Richter, art historian (born 1882)

== See also ==
- 1972 in British music
- 1972 in British television
- List of British films of 1972
