= David Hughes (tenor) =

British opera singer (1925–1972)

David Hughes (Geoffrey Paddison)

David Hughes (born Geoffrey Paddison; 11 October 1925 – 19 October 1972) was an English pop and opera singer.

== The popular tenor ==
Paddison was born in Bournbrook, Birmingham, England to an English mother and Welsh father. As a child he listened to records by Caruso. He found work as a railway clerk at Curzon Street, Birmingham. During his time there he was invited to sing "On the Road to Mandalay" at an office concert. This was so well received that he started taking professional singing lessons. He also was an RAF cadet and took flying lessons at Wythall airfield near Birmingham. In 1945 he joined the RAF. The war in Europe was over and he was despatched on a ship to the Pacific which was intended to construct an airfield in support of the war against Japan. Following the fall of Japan his ship was diverted to Hong Kong as part of Operation Ethelred under Rear-Admiral Harcourt in order to receive the surrender of the Japanese. Paddison found himself acting as a policeman. While here he regularly sang on ZBW in Kowloon, the armed forces' radio station. At this time he was singing Bing Crosby songs. After returning to the UK and being demobilised in 1947 he received a grant to study singing at Wigmore Hall, London.

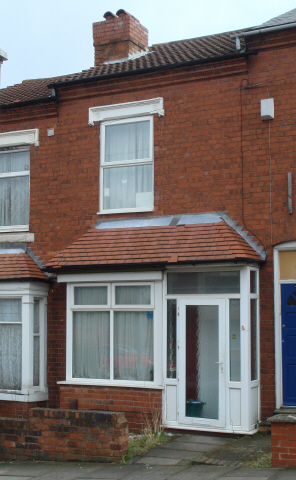
48 Alton Road, Bournbrook - David Hughes's birthplace

After that he studied at the Royal Academy of Music and Dramatic Art. He had an early break in 1948 appearing with Ginger Rogers and Lizbeth Webb in Carissima, a West End musical. In 1951, he appeared on Henry Hall's "Guest Night". He was introduced by Hall as "the young Welsh tenor", as his stage name "David Hughes" which was his father's Christian names was typically Welsh. He appeared often in the 1950s on television and radio. These shows included Presenting David Hughes, Sunday Night at the London Palladium and two series of his own show Make Mine Music (1959). In 1954, while touring Australia, he arranged for his fiancée Anne Sullivan to join him there, and were married. He appeared in the stage show Summer Song in 1956, a biographical musical about Antonín Dvořák's visit to the United States. Sally Ann Howes was the female lead. In 1956 he had his only hit in the UK Singles Chart, "By The Fountains of Rome". The composer was Mátyás Seiber and the lyrics by Norman Newell, who also wrote hits for Ken Dodd ("Promises", 1966), Shirley Bassey ("Never Never Never", 1973) and Matt Monro ("Portrait of My Love", 1960).

He also co-starred in the musical Scapa Flow at the Adelphi Theatre alongside Pete Murray and Edward Woodward. He participated in the UK heat of the Eurovision Song Contest in 1960, A Song For Europe, finishing in second place with the song "Mi Amor".

== The opera singer ==
Shortly after appearing in the musical Seagulls Over Sorrento (1962), and whilst appearing in a summer season show at Torquay, he had his first heart attack.

Whilst recovering he decided to undertake his first love and retrain as an opera singer. This was a major undertaking and meant starting at the bottom.

His first role was as the high priest in Idomeneo at Glyndebourne in 1963. He also sang with Sadler's Wells, English National and Welsh National operas. Sir John Barbirolli engaged him on several occasions as the tenor soloist in Verdi's Requiem. He earned a reputation as a thorough professional, popular with colleagues. His most famous role was as Don José in Carmen, a role he performed over 100 times. He also performed the role of Lieutenant Pinkerton in Madam Butterfly many times.

He never forgot his fans of popular music, continuing to do Sunday concerts in theatres all over the UK. His popularity also saw him presenting his show "Make Mine Music" with the Midland Light Orchestra on BBC Radio.

He was on Desert Island Discs twice. On 21 May 1956 as a pop singer, and on 23 November, 1970 as a tenor.

On 8 October 1972, he fell ill while singing the part of Pinkerton at the London Coliseum. He collapsed in the wings near the end but managed to complete the character's offstage vocal lines, which complete the opera. He died the following day, from heart failure, at the age of 47.

== Namesake ==
- He chose his father's two Christian names to use as his stage name. His father was David Hughes Paddison.

== Discography ==
=== Popular songs ===
- "Santo Natale / Not as a Stranger" (single) (1954)
- "By the Fountains of Rome" (single) (1956) UK No. 27
- Here in My Heart (compilation)
- The Best of David Hughes (compilation)
- David Hughes. Songs you Love (1968)

(Compilation)

- Great British Song Stylist (compilation)

=== Stage musicals ===
- Summer Song (1956)
- Plain and Fancy
- Scapa Flow (1962)
- Here in My Heart

=== Classical music ===
- 16th–18th Century Songs of Love
- Favourite Opera / Operetta Arias and Songs You Love EMI TWO 319, City of Birmingham Symphony Orchestra, conducted by Louis Fremaux, recorded in Birmingham Town Hall
- The Merry Widow
