= UK Albums Chart =

British albums sales chart

The Official Albums Chart is the United Kingdom's industry-recognised national record chart for albums. Entries are ranked by sales and audio streaming. It was published for the first time on 22 July 1956 and is compiled every week by the Official Charts Company (OCC) on Fridays (previously Sundays). It is broadcast on BBC Radio 1 (top 5) and found on the OCC website as a Top 100 or on UKChartsPlus as a Top 200, with positions continuing until all sales have been tracked in data only available to industry insiders. However, even though number 100 was classed as a hit album (as in the case of The Guinness Book of British Hit Albums) in the 1980s until January 1989, since the compilations were removed, this definition was changed to Top 75 with follow-up books such as The Virgin Book of British Hit Albums only including this data. As of 2021, Since 1983, the OCC generally provides a public charts for hits and weeks up to the Top 100. Business customers can also require additional chart placings.

To qualify for the Official Albums Chart, the album must be the correct length and price. It must be more than three tracks or 20 minutes long and not be classed as a budget album. A budget album costs between £0.50 and £3.75. Full details of the rules can be found on the OCC website.

== History ==
According to the canon of the OCC, the official British albums chart was the Record Mirror chart from 22 July 1956 to 1 November 1958; the Melody Maker chart from 8 November 1958 to March 1960; the Record Retailer chart from 1960 to 1969; and the Official Albums Chart from 1969 on. For eight weeks in February and March 1971 no Official Albums Chart was compiled due to a postal strike – for this period, the OCC uses the chart compiled by Melody Maker instead.

In the 1970s the new album chart was revealed at 12:45 pm on Thursdays on BBC Radio 1, and then in the early 1980s moved to 6:05 pm (later 6:30 pm) on Wednesday evenings during the Peter Powell and Bruno Brookes shows. In October 1987 it moved to Monday lunchtimes, during the Gary Davies show, and from April to October 1993 it briefly had its show from 7:00–8:00 pm on Sunday evenings, introduced by Lynn Parsons. Since October 1993 it has been included in The Official Chart show from 4:00–5:45 pm on Fridays (previously from 4:00–7:00 pm on Sundays). A weekly 'Album Chart' show was licensed out to BBC Radio 2 and presented by Simon Mayo, until it ended on 2 April 2007.

Though album sales tend to produce more revenue and, over time, act as a greater measure of an artist's success, this chart receives less media attention than the UK Singles Chart, because overall sales of an album are more important than its peak position. 2005 saw a record number of artist album sales with 126.2 million sold in the UK.

In February 2015, it was announced that due to the falling sales of albums and rise in popularity of audio streaming, the Official Albums Chart would begin including streaming data from March 2015. Under the revised methodology, the Official Charts Company takes the 12 most streamed tracks from one album, with the top-two songs being down-weighted in line with the average of the rest. The total of these streams is divided by 1000 and added to the pure sales of the album. This calculation was designed to ensure that the chart rundown continues to reflect the popularity of the albums themselves, rather than just the performance of one or two smash hit singles. The final number one album on the UK Albums Chart to be based purely on sales alone was Smoke + Mirrors by Imagine Dragons. On 1 March 2015, In the Lonely Hour by Sam Smith became the first album to top the new streaming-incorporated Official Albums Chart.

The weekly Top 75 UK Albums Chart (albums described as hits in the case of British Hit Singles & Albums or The Virgin Book of British Hit Albums) were published in Music Week magazine until 2021. In 2018 Future (publisher of 'Louder Sound' publications such as Metal Hammer and Classic Rock) acquired Music Week publisher NewBay Media. Future decided that the publication would go monthly from March 2021, and so a bespoke monthly Official Albums Chart Top 75 (similar to album charts used by Top of the Pops in the early 1990s and Absolute 80s on Sundays) started to be published from this date alongside monthly singles charts and specialist/genre charts.

By 2022, the weekly album chart had started to regularly feature a pattern of acts getting a Top 10 new entry one week, followed by a dramatic decline the next, with most of these releases exiting the Top 75 completely. The majority of these acts would be indie and rock bands like the Wombats, Sea Power and Maxïmo Park, who would market their album to the type of people who would want to own the release via a physical format rather than streaming it.

The first number one on the UK Albums Chart was Songs for Swingin' Lovers! by Frank Sinatra for the week ending 22 July 1956. As of the week ending 19 November 2026, the UK Albums Chart has had 1455 different number one albums.

== Record holders ==
=== Most time on the album charts ===
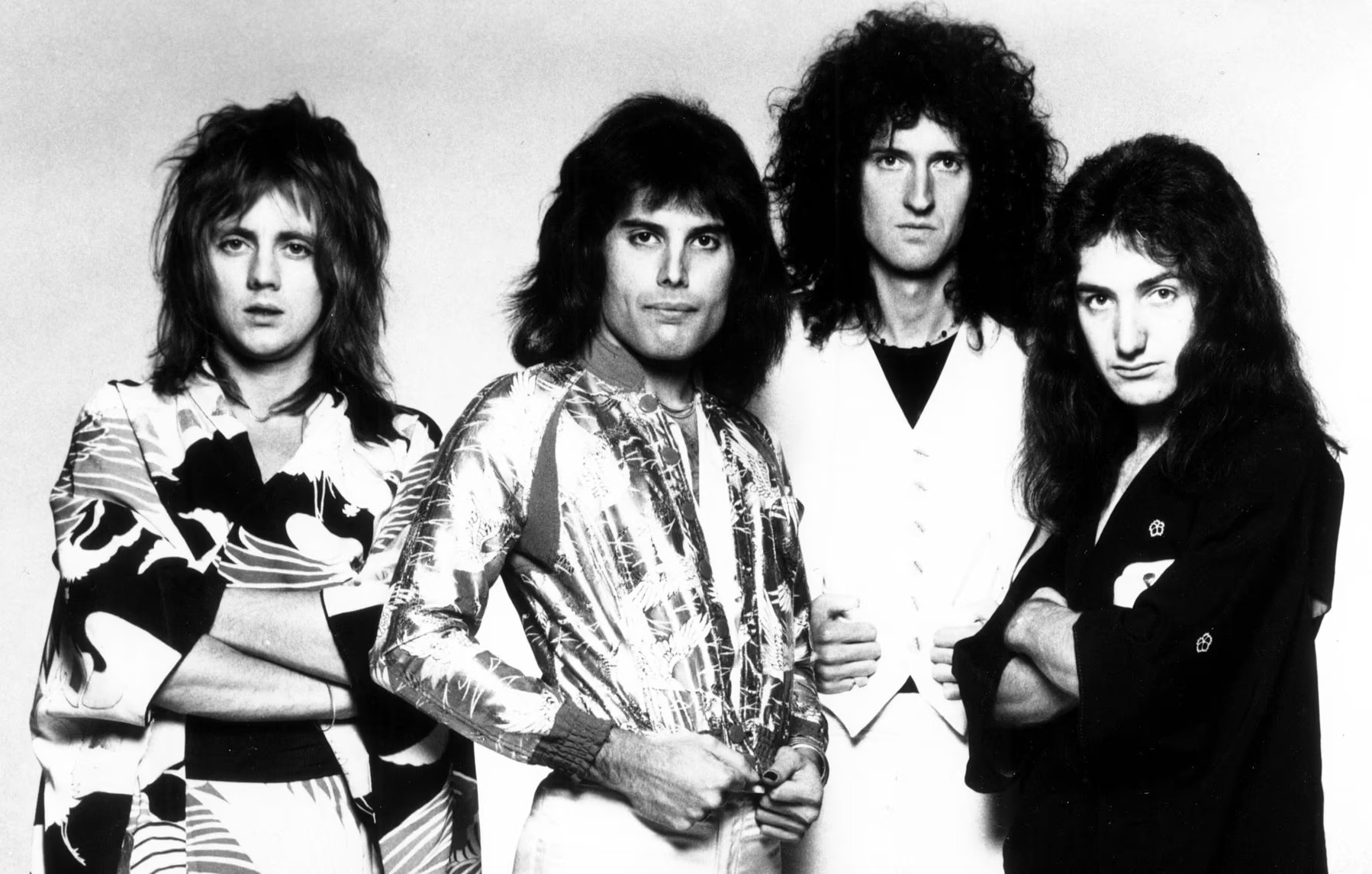
Queen (pictured here in 1975) have spent more time on the UK Albums Chart than any other act.

The most successful artists in the charts depend on the criteria used. As of February 2016, Queen albums have spent more time on the British album charts than any other musical act, followed by the Beatles, Elvis Presley, U2 and ABBA.

In July 2021, ABBA's Gold: Greatest Hits was officially recognised by the Official Charts Company as the first album to spend over 1000 weeks on the Albums Chart, but this total does not include 2014's Gold – 40th Anniversary Edition (which like Queen's The Platinum Collection is a 3-CD set also including More ABBA Gold: More ABBA Hits and The Golden B-sides) or additional weeks inside the Top 100 missing from the OCC's database before February 1994 (as with the singles chart, Music Week only published the Top 75 as this was the public chart for store owners to use in their record shops with the Top 150 Artist Albums Chart being for industry insiders/ChartsPlus subscribers).

=== Number-one related records ===
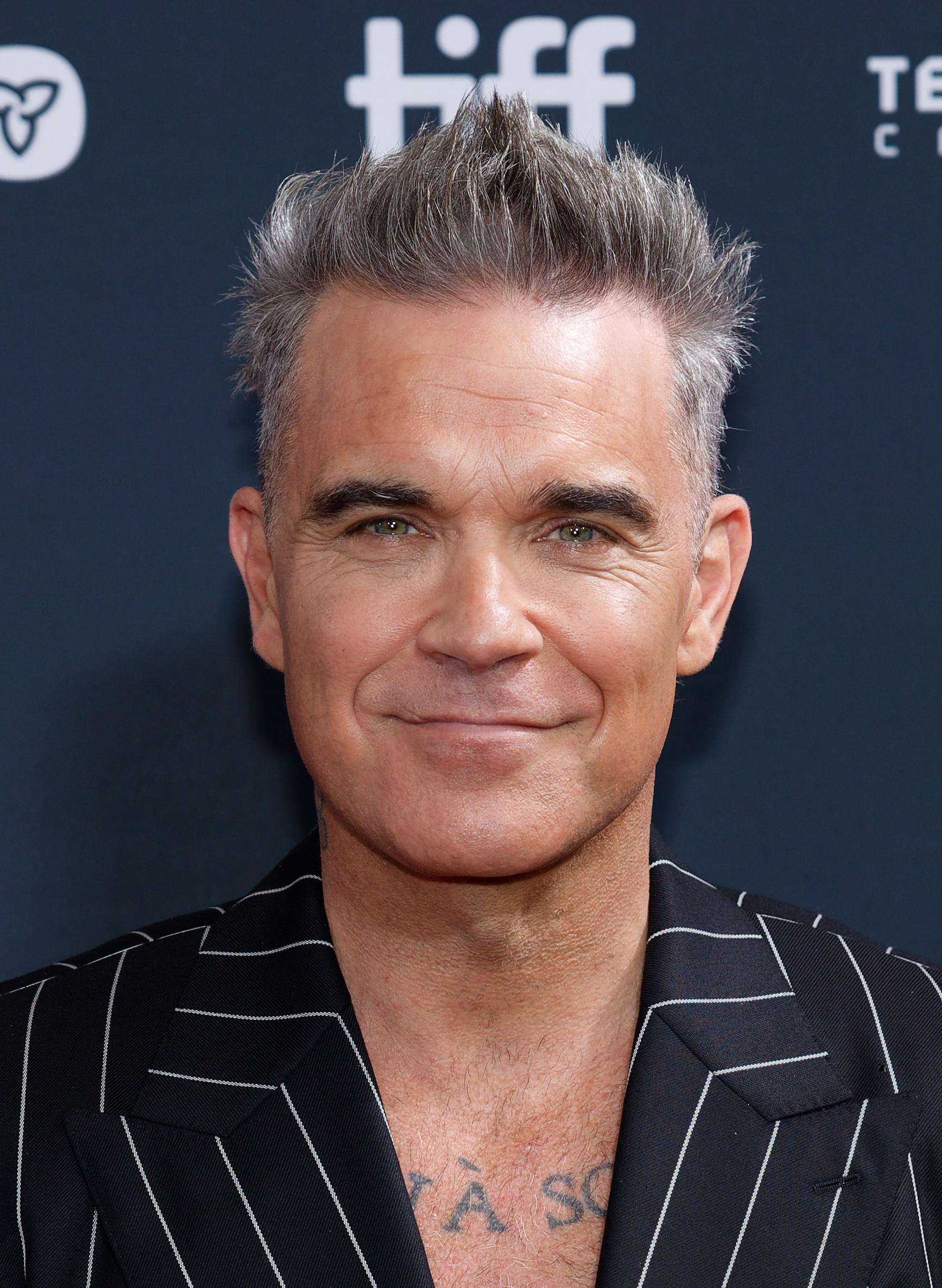
Robbie Williams (pictured here in 2024) has had more albums reach number one in the UK Albums Chart than any other act.

By most weeks at number one, the Beatles lead with a total of 176 weeks. Robbie Williams is the artist with the most number one albums with 16 as of January 2026, with the release of his thirteenth studio album Britpop. This surpassed the previous record of 15 set by the Beatles. In third place, jointly, are The Rolling Stones and Taylor Swift, both with 14 number ones. Regarding the tally of number ones for some artists, the Official Charts Company has classed re-issues of The Rolling Stones' Exile on Main Street and Goats Head Soup, as brand new hits/number ones due to the amount of bonus material available, formats released and the fact that the issuing record label had changed.

As of September 2022, Elvis Presley is still the male solo artist with the most weeks at number one with a total of 66 weeks and most top ten albums by any artist, charting 53 releases. Until this same month, he also held the record for the most number one albums by a solo artist in a tie with Robbie Williams, a record which Williams broke with the compilation album XXV.

Taylor Swift has the most number one albums by a female artist in the UK, with 14 as of October 2025. This puts her in joint third place (with The Rolling Stones) as the artist with the most number one album in UK chart history. Swift also jointly holds the record for the most consecutive number one albums with 10, a record she holds with Eminem. Adele is the female solo artist with the most weeks at number one, with a total of 37 weeks (23 of which were for her second album which is also the most weeks at number one for an album by a female artist). The Spice Girls are the female group with the most weeks at number one, with a total of 18 weeks (15 of which were for their debut album Spice).

The longest-running number one album, both consecutively and non-consecutively, is the soundtrack of the film South Pacific. It had a consecutive run of 70 weeks from November 1958 to March 1960, and had further runs at the top in 1960 and 1961, making a non-consecutive total of 115 weeks. The album chart was still in its infancy at this time and the methodology for collecting sales data was limited.

=== Most albums sold ===
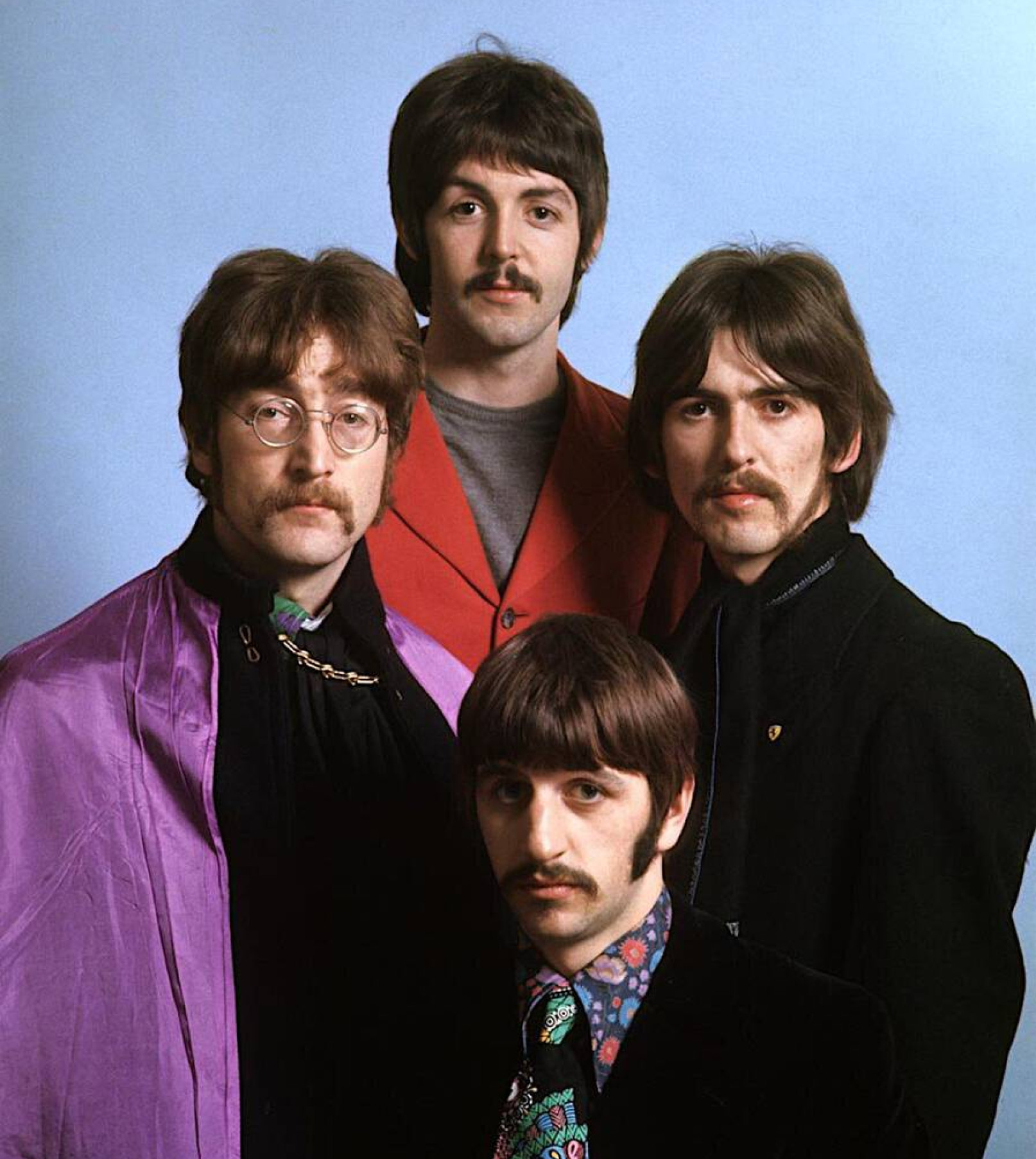
Sgt. Pepper's Lonely Hearts Club Band, the eighth studio album by The Beatles (pictured here the same year) was the most sold album in the UK until 2006.

For many years, The Beatles' Sgt. Pepper's Lonely Hearts Club Band was the best-selling album in UK chart history, but is now in fifth place after being supplanted by Queen's Greatest Hits, ABBA's Gold: Greatest Hits, Oasis's (What's the Story) Morning Glory? and Adele's 21 (5.7 million). (What's the Story) Morning Glory? (6.1 million sales) is now the best-selling studio album in UK chart history (Queen and ABBA are compilation albums). Queen's Greatest Hits has sold over 7.8 million copies (including downloads and equivalent streams) as of July 2022. ABBA's Gold has sold over 7.1 million, and Sgt. Pepper has sold in excess of 5.6 million copies.

=== Age-related records ===
The youngest artist to top the chart is Neil Reid, whose debut album topped the chart in 1972 when he was only 12 years old, while the youngest female artist is Billie Eilish who was 17 years old when she debuted at the top with When We All Fall Asleep, Where Do We Go?. The record for the oldest artist to top the charts is Vera Lynn, who was 92 years old when she was at number one with We'll Meet Again: The Very Best of Vera Lynn, released in 2009 (though the album only contains material she recorded between 1936 and 1959). Lynn, who died in 2020 at the age of 103, also leads the list for the oldest artist to have a chart album, when the 2017 release of Vera Lynn 100, released to mark her 100th birthday (though again, this only contains material she recorded decades earlier), peaked at number 3. Currently, the oldest living male artist to have topped the UK albums chart is Paul McCartney, who reached the top in 2026 with new studio album The Boys of Dungeon Lane at the age of 83, while 95 year old Tony Bennett charted at number 6 on the chart of 8–14 October 2021 with his Lady Gaga duets album Love For Sale, becoming recognised by Guinness World Records as the oldest person to release an album of new material.

=== Female solo artist records ===
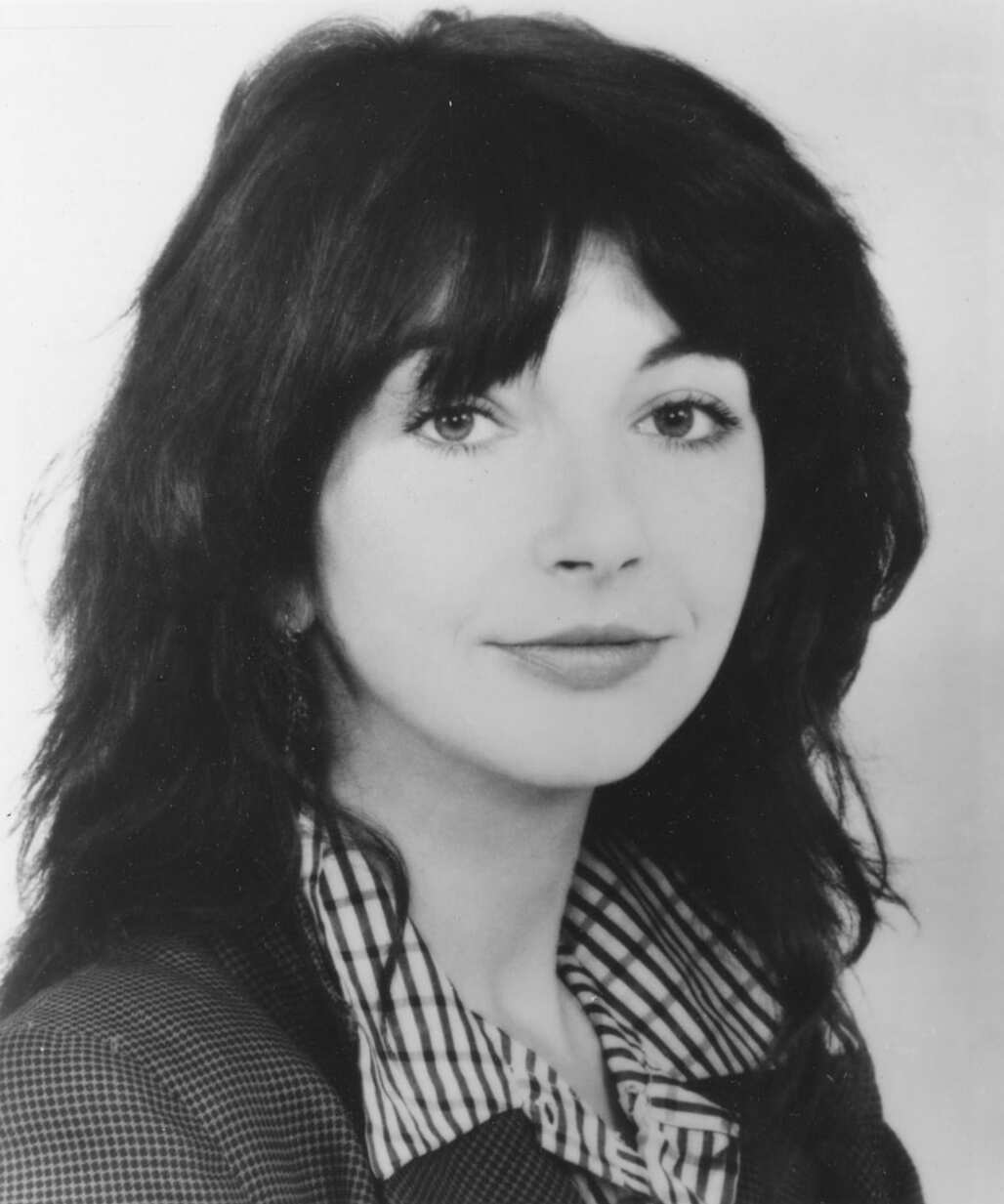
Kate Bush (pictured here in 1981) became the first female solo artist to have an album go to number one in the UK with Never for Ever.

In 1980, Kate Bush became the first British female solo artist to have a number-one album in the UK with Never for Ever, as well as being the first album by any female solo artist to enter the chart at number 1. In August 2014, she became the first female artist to have eight albums in the Official UK Top 40 Albums Chart simultaneously, (altogether she had eleven albums in the Top 50 in one week). She is currently in fourth place for artists having the most simultaneous UK Top 40 albums, behind Elvis Presley and David Bowie who both tie for the most simultaneous Top 40 albums (twelve each, both immediately following their deaths in 1977 and 2016 respectively), and The Beatles who had eleven in 2009 when remastered versions of their albums were released.

=== Fastest sold albums ===
The fastest selling album (first chart week sales) is 25 by Adele. Released in November 2015, it sold over 800,000 copies in its first week. However, the album Be Here Now by Oasis is a controversial second place, this is due to the fact its release date was irregular, being released on a Thursday instead of the usual Monday. The record was released on 21 August 1997 and sold around 813,000 in its first seven days, which surpasses the current claimant to the title, though this topic is still highly contested. Additionally, Adele's 25 became the fastest album to sell over one million copies in the UK by a clear margin. It achieved the feat within 10 days, beating the former record holder (again, Oasis's Be Here Now) which took 17 days.

=== Number ones over the span of decades ===
In September 2020, The Rolling Stones became the first act to have reached number one in the album chart during six different decades (1960s, 1970s, 1980s, 1990s, 2010s and 2020s). For solo artists, Elvis Presley was the first artist to score UK number-one albums in five different decades (the 1950s, 1960s, 1970s, 2000s and 2010s). In 2020, Bruce Springsteen became the first solo artist to score UK number-one albums in five consecutive decades (the 1980s, 1990s, 2000s, 2010s, and 2020s) with his twelfth number-one album Letter to You. Just two weeks later, Kylie Minogue became the first female solo artist to have UK number-one albums in five different decades (all consecutively, the 1980s, 1990s, 2000s, 2010s, and 2020s), with her eighth UK number-one album Disco. In November 2021, ABBA became the third group (after The Rolling Stones and The Beatles) to score a UK number one album in five different decades (in ABBA's case, the 1970s, 1980s, 1990s, 2000s, and 2020s) with the band's tenth number one album, Voyage. With that album, ABBA also became the artist with the longest gap between number one studio albums, with 40 years (since The Visitors in 1981).

=== Most weeks at number one ===
The longest number one by a group is Simon and Garfunkel's Bridge Over Troubled Water which was number one for 33 weeks (13 of which were consecutive). The longest consecutive number one by a group was the Beatles' Please Please Me, which held the top spot for a straight 30 weeks. The longest number one by a male solo artist was Elvis Presley with G.I. Blues which stayed at the top for 22 weeks (his Blue Hawaii album was also the longest consecutive number one album for a male artist with 17 weeks). Adele's album 21 has the most weeks at number one by a female solo artist (and by a solo artist of any gender) with 23 weeks, 11 of which were consecutive (which is also a record for a female artist).

=== Year-end/Decade-end records ===
The first studio album and non-soundtrack or cast recording album to top the year-end chart was With the Beatles by The Beatles in 1963 – they became the first group to achieve this feat. Elton John's Don't Shoot Me I'm Only the Piano Player in 1973, marks the first album by a male artist and solo act to do so. The first female solo artist to have the UK's year-end best seller was Barbra Streisand in 1982, with Love Songs.

The first studio album and non-soundtrack or cast recording album to top the decade-end chart was Sgt. Pepper's Lonely Hearts Club Band by The Beatles in the 1960s – they became the first group to achieve this. James Blunt's Back to Bedlam, in the 2000s, marks the first album by a male artist and solo act to do it. Blunt was the only performer in history to top the decade chart with a debut album. The first female solo artist to achieve this feat was Adele in the 2010s, with 21.

=== Least records sold ===
Dua Lipa's Future Nostalgia holds the record for having the lowest one-week sales while at the top of the chart in the modern era, when it was number one the week beginning 15 May 2020 with sales of only 7,317.

=== Biggest drop from number one ===
In 2021, You Me At Six (Suckapunch) and Ben Howard (Collections from the Whiteout) became the first artists to have a number one album exit the Top 100 with only one week on the chart (though when The Guinness Book of British Hit Albums did their list of number one albums with the fewest weeks on the chart, it was based on the Top 75 countdown and featured acts such as Little Angels with their 1993 album Jam). In 2023, The Lottery Winners made the record for the steepest drop from number one when their album Anxiety Replacement Therapy fell out of the Top 200 altogether with second week sales of 880 copies. This occurrence of number one albums dropping out of the top 100 in their second week of release prompted an article in The Guardian newspaper wondering whether the UK album chart was broken.

=== NFT-related records ===
On 26 August 2022, Aitch became the first artist to chart with an album released in a NFT format when Close to Home debuted at number 2 (with Steps beating the rapper to number one and becoming the first mixed-gender British act to get chart topping albums in four consecutive decades). A week later, Will of the People by Muse became the first NFT-listed album to top the charts, with the limited edition NFT listed as part of the 3,889 downloaded copies it sold out of 51,510 sales.

=== Records involving music labels ===
Also on 16 September 2022, Columbia became the first record label to take the Top 3 chart positions with three different acts with releases by Robbie Williams, Ozzy Osbourne and Harry Styles occupying number 1, 2 and 3 (with parent company Sony Music also having the number 4 with a re-issue of Manic Street Preachers' Know Your Enemy). In the previous 66 years of the chart, this occurrence where one label has had the Top 3 has only happened twice before with Parlophone taking the Top 3 positions in 1964 with two albums by The Beatles and The Hollies' Stay With The Hollies and K-Tel having three TV-advertised compilations at number 1, 2 and 3 on the chart of 31 December 1972.

=== Debut albums ===
The fastest-selling debut albums (first-week sales):

- All-time highest sales by a solo female artist is Susan Boyle with I Dreamed a Dream, which sold 411,820 copies in November 2009
- By a band is Arctic Monkeys with Whatever People Say I Am, That's What I'm Not, which sold 363,735 copies in 2006
- By a solo male act is Craig David with Born to Do It, which sold 225,320 copies in 2000

Sam Smith holds the record for most weeks spent in the Top 10 by a debut album with In the Lonely Hour, with 76, surpassing a record previously held by Emeli Sandé.

== Official Compilations Chart Top 100 ==
Over more than sixty years of compiling album sales, the various chart compiling firms have had a problem with the success of multi-artist compilation albums, with these albums (mostly TV-advertised collections featuring a number of hits) either being allowed to chart in the main album chart or excluded.

In August 1971, the British Market Research Bureau (BMRB) allowed low-priced budget albums to chart as well as standard compilations. This decision gave a number one to Music For Pleasure's Hot Hits 6, which went straight in at the top of the chart and was joined at number 6 by a new entry for Hallmark's Top of the Pops Volume 18, another album featuring a selection of popular tracks performed by session artists in the style of a recent hit (and unconnected with the BBC series of Top of the Pops albums, which would follow in the 1990s).

This decision was soon overturned, with these anonymous cover albums being taken out the chart again. On the Official Albums Chart Top 50 for the week ending 18 August 1973, all the compilations listed as 'various artists' albums were taken out of the chart, but those billed as 'official soundtracks' (to films such as A Clockwork Orange and Cabaret) were kept in. As the Ronco-released tie-in to the 1973 film That'll Be the Day was listed as a various artist album and not as a soundtrack, it disappeared from the chart after its seventh week at number one alongside EMI's former number one Pure Gold and Phillip's 20 Original Chart Hits.

In 1983, the Now That's What I Call Music series was launched by EMI/Virgin, followed by CBS/WEA's rival Hits Album series a year later and Chrysalis/MCA's Out Now! in 1985. From this point in the 1980s, every regular edition of Now That's What I Call Music topped the albums chart (apart from Now 4 which was kept of the number one spot by the first ever Hits Album), with these albums from the three major-label joint-ventures joined in the charts by many albums from all the regular compilation specialists like K-Tel, Telstar and Stylus. As the amount of compilations in the chart were keeping out artists from reaching number one or charting at all, it was decided that all the various artist albums would be removed from the Official Albums Chart Top 100.

In January 1989, all the various artist compilation albums were removed from the Top 100 albums chart and given their own Top 20 chart (found in Music Week and Record Mirror), with the main albums chart reformatted as a top 75 (as far as hit albums are concerned) to equal the singles chart.

As of 2022, the OCC publishes the Official Compilations Chart Top 100 on their website, which as well as listing the chart places of all the various Now That's What I Call Music!, Hits Albums and Ministry of Sound Annuals that have been released, now include Motion Picture Cast Recordings such as The Greatest Showman or A Star Is Born and Original Broadway/West End cast albums such as Hamilton, all three of which were included in the main artist albums chart before 2020. In addition to the main Compilations chart, all the 'Motion Picture Cast Recordings' and cast albums get their own Official Soundtrack Albums Chart Top 50, but are still classed as artist albums as far as the singles chart is concerned with, for example, only three tracks from early 2022 chart topper Encanto (a Disney soundtrack which sold 13,855 units to be at number one for the chart of 3 February 2022) being allowed to chart as singles at a time.

== Albums with the most weeks at number one on the UK Albums Chart ==
List of albums with the most weeks at number one on the UK Albums Chart
Position	Artist	Album	Year	Weeks
1	Original Soundtrack	South Pacific (soundtrack)	1958	115 weeks
2	Original Soundtrack	The Sound of Music (soundtrack)	1965	70 weeks
3	Original Soundtrack	The King And I (soundtrack)	1956	48 weeks
4	Simon and Garfunkel	Bridge Over Troubled Water	1970	33 weeks
5	The Beatles	Please Please Me	1963	30 weeks
6	Motion Picture Cast Recording	The Greatest Showman (soundtrack) (Note: This album was excluded from the Official Albums chart when Motion Picture Cast Recordings were reclassified as compilations, rather than an 'artist'. Since 2020, The Greatest Showman soundtrack has returned to number one on the Official Compilations Chart Top 100 for 28 more weeks, giving it 56 weeks at number one altogether, with its last week at number one being on the chart week-ending 29 September 2022)	2017	28 weeks
6	The Beatles	Sgt. Pepper's Lonely Hearts Club Band	1967	28 weeks
7	Adele	21	2011	23 weeks
8	Elvis Presley	G.I. Blues (soundtrack)	1960	22 weeks
9	The Beatles	With The Beatles	1963	21 weeks
9	The Beatles	A Hard Day's Night	1964	21 weeks
10	Ed Sheeran	Divide	2017	20 weeks
11	Original Cast Recording	My Fair Lady	1956	19 weeks
12	Original Soundtrack	Saturday Night Fever (soundtrack)	1977	18 weeks
12	Elvis Presley	Blue Hawaii (original soundtrack)	1961	18 weeks
12	The Beatles	Abbey Road	1969	18 weeks
13	The Carpenters	The Singles: 1969–1973	1973	17 weeks
15	Spice Girls	Spice	1996	15 weeks
15	Phil Collins	...But Seriously	1989	15 weeks
16	Dire Straits	Brothers in Arms	1985	14 weeks

== See also ==
- UK singles chart
- List of UK Albums Chart Christmas number ones
- List of UK Albums Chart number ones
- List of artists with the most UK Albums Chart number ones
- List of artists who have spent the most weeks on the UK music charts
- List of best-selling albums by year in the United Kingdom
- List of albums which have spent the most weeks on the UK Albums Chart
- List of songs which have spent the most weeks on the UK singles chart
- Lists of fastest-selling UK debuts albums
