= Neil Reid (album) =

Studio album by Neil Reid
- Released: 1972
- Recorded: 1971
- Genre: Pop ballads
- Label: Decca Records

Neil Reid chronology
Neil Reid (1972)	Smile (1972)

Singles from Neil Reid
- 1. "Mother of Mine" Released: 1971

Neil Reid is the first album, for Scottish Opportunity Knocks winner, Neil Reid. The album reached number 1 on the UK Albums Chart and the single "Mother of Mine" also peaked at number 2 in the UK Singles Chart.

== Track listing ==
1. You're the Cream in My Coffee
2. On the Sunny Side of the Street
3. Peg O' My Heart
4. Ye Banks and Braes
5. Happy Heart
6. When I'm Sixty-Four
7. Look for the Silver Lining
8. If I Could Write a Song
9. When I Take My Sugar to Tea
10. My Mother's Eyes
11. I'm Gonna Knock on Your Door
12. The Sweetheart Tree
13. One Little Word Called Love
14. How Small We Are, How Little We Know
15. Ten Guitars
16. Mother of Mine

== Charts ==
Chart (1972)	Peak Position
UK Albums Chart	1
