= 1968 in British television =

This is a list of British television related events from 1968.

== Events ==
=== January ===
- 1 January – The colour television licence is introduced when a £5 "colour supplement" is added to the £5 monochrome licence fee, therefore making the cost of a colour licence £10.
- 5 January – Gardeners' World is broadcast for the first time on BBC2. The programme would still be running over fifty years later.
- 13 January – Sooty, Harry Corbett's glove puppet bear, moves from the BBC to ITV following its cancellation the previous year by the controller of BBC1, Paul Fox. A new series would air later in the year and be produced by Thames.

=== February ===
- 4 February – The series The Prisoner finishes its first run on British television.
- 5 February – BBC2's Newsroom becomes the first news programme in the country to be broadcast in colour.
- 12 February – Children's stop-motion animation The Herbs debuts on BBC1, the first programme under a different production to Gordon Murray Puppets to be filmed in colour.

=== March ===
- 4 March – TWW closes. The station has lost its franchise in the previous ITV licensing awards and decided to close 10 weeks early, selling its remaining airtime to HTV for £500,000; however, Harlech is not ready to commence transmissions and to fill the gap an interim service, staffed by former TWW staff, is provided until Harlech's launch on 20 May.
- 11 March – The Yugoslavian and West German produced children's series The White Horses is shown on BBC1.

=== April ===
- 1 April – Reporting Scotland launches on BBC1 Scotland, replacing A Quick Look Round.
- 6 April – The 13th Eurovision Song Contest is held at the Royal Albert Hall in London. Spain wins the contest with the song "La, la, la", performed in Spanish by Massiel after Spanish authorities refuse to allow Joan Manuel Serrat to perform it in Catalan. This year marks the first time the event is broadcast in colour, with several European countries transmitting it in colour. Because BBC1 does not yet broadcast in colour, BBC2 airs an encore edition of the show in colour the following day.
- 15 April – BBC1 airs the network television premiere of Alfred Hitchcock's 1960 horror movie Psycho, starring Anthony Perkins and Janet Leigh.
- 20 April – Conservative MP Enoch Powell makes his Rivers of Blood speech about immigration and anti-discrimination legislation in the United Kingdom. The speech is made at the Midland Hotel in Birmingham to a meeting of the Conservative Political Centre at 2:30pm. The Birmingham-based television company ATV has seen an advance copy of the speech this morning and its news editor has ordered a television crew to go to the venue where they film sections of the speech.

=== May ===
- 4 May – Mary Hopkin performs on the British TV show Opportunity Knocks. Hopkin catches the attention of model Twiggy who recommends her to Beatle Paul McCartney who soon signs Hopkin to Apple Records.
- 7 May – BBC1 airs the M. R. James ghost story Whistle and I'll Come to You, starring Michael Hordern.
- 20 May – Harlech (which becomes HTV in 1970) starts its dual service for Wales and the West of England, replacing the interim ITSWW which has itself replaced TWW in March.

=== June ===
- 14 June – BBC1 launches the children's show The Basil Brush Show, featuring mischievous puppet fox Basil.
- 24 June-6 July – The Wimbledon Championships are shown on ITV for the final time.

=== July ===
- 9 July – American time-travel series The Time Tunnel debuts on BBC1.
- 28 July – Final day on air for ABC which has broadcast to the North and Midlands regions during weekends. The 1968 contract round sees the end of weekend franchises in these regions. It is also the last day on air for ATV London which loses its weekend franchise to the newly formed London Weekend Television.
- 29 July – Granada and ATV broadcast seven days a week to the North-West and Midlands respectively. The North is split into two regions with Granada broadcasting to the North-West and Yorkshire Television broadcasting to the Yorkshire region. It is also the last day on air for Rediffusion London in the London area.
- 29 and 30 July – ITV shows test cricket for the only time, and only part-networked, when the last two days of the Headingley Test against Australia coincide with the launch of Yorkshire Television. The morning session is the first thing shown on Thames Television, ahead its official opening later that day.
- 30 July
  - Thames Television goes on air, having taken over the London weekday franchise from Rediffusion, London. Thames is a new joint venture between the respective parent companies of ABC (ABPC, known for the ABC cinema chain) and Rediffusion (British Electric Traction), the ABPC having been awarded the controlling 51% stake in the new London weekday broadcaster but with profits shared equally. Thames's evening news program Today, presented by Eamonn Andrews, features Jamaican Barbara Blake Hannah as the first black news presenter on British television.
  - Children's magazine programme Magpie premieres on ITV.
  - The first episode of The Sooty Show to air on ITV.
- 31 July – Sitcom Dad's Army, set in the World War II Home Guard, begins its nine-year run on BBC1 with the episode "The Man and the Hour".

=== August ===
- 2 August – London Weekend Television takes over the London weekend franchise from ATV. Going on air initially as London Weekend Television, it later adopts the name London Weekend before reverting to its original name (often abbreviated to LWT) in 1978.
- 3 August – ITV technicians' strike immediately after the 1968 franchise changes. causing a national stoppage. The individual companies are off the air for several weeks and an emergency service is established. The ITV Emergency National Service is presented by management personnel with no regional variations, the first time that a uniform presentation practice has been adopted across all regions. The strike ends on 18 August.
- 21 August – The BBC's scheduled transmission of the fourth Dad's Army episode is postponed for coverage of the Warsaw Pact invasion of Czechoslovakia.

=== September ===
- 2 September – Morecambe and Wise return to the BBC in The Morecambe & Wise Show. Debuting on BBC2, the show eventually moves to BBC1 in September 1971.
- 7 September – The new ITV company London Weekend Television wins the rights to show the Gillette Cup final between Warwickshire and Sussex. This coverage is only partially networked, with other regions cutting off their coverage earlier, but coverage of the finish – shown principally in the London and Southern areas – is faded out with six minutes to go to make way for advertising and then David Frost's programme.
- 8 September – ITV broadcasts The Beatles live performance of Hey Jude on Frost on Sunday.
- 9 September – Translated French children's puppet series Hector's House debuts on BBC1.
- 14 September – The final editions of Look Westward (Westward Television), The Viewer (Tyne Tees Television), TV Post (Ulster Television), Television Weekly (Harlech Television) and TV World (ATV Midlands) are broadcast.
- 21 September – TVTimes becomes a national publication, as previously some ITV companies have produced their own listings magazines.
- 29 September – Joe 90, the science-fiction Supermarionation series created by Gerry and Sylvia Anderson debuts on ITV.

=== October ===
- 12–27 October – The BBC and ITV provide coverage of the 1968 Olympic Games. The BBC's coverage is extensive, with live coverage into the night and a daily breakfast programme Good Morning Mexico. This is also the first time the Games are broadcast in colour, albeit only on BBC2 which simulcasts the majority of BBC1's coverage. This is also the first time that ITV shows the Olympic Games.

=== November ===
- 2 November – BBC1 debuts Zokko!, the first British Saturday morning live children's magazine programme.
- 16 November – ITV begins showing the Hammer Film Productions horror anthology series Journey to the Unknown.

=== December ===
- 7 December – American science fiction series Land of the Giants makes its debut on ITV.
- 25 December – BBC1 shows the television premiere of the 1959 Billy Wilder comedy film Some Like it Hot, starring Marilyn Monroe, Tony Curtis and Jack Lemmon.

== Debuts ==
=== BBC1 ===
- 6 January – The Portrait of a Lady (1968)
- 22 January – Hugh and I Spy (1968)
- 30 January – Cilla (1968–1976)
- 11 February – Nicholas Nickleby (1968)
- 12 February – The Herbs (1968)
- 11 March – The White Horses (1966–1967)
- 1 April – Reporting Scotland (1968–present)
- 7 April – The First Lady (1968–1969)
- 7 May – Whistle and I'll Come to You (1968)
- 10 May – Thicker Than Water (1968–1969)
- 12 May – The Railway Children (1968)
- 21 May – Lulu's Back in Town (1968)
- 24 May – Wild, Wild Women (1968–1969)
- 14 June
  - The Basil Brush Show (1968–1980, 2002–2007)
  - Me Mammy (1968–1971)
- 23 June – The Dave Allen Show (1968)
- 30 June – Triton (1968)
- 9 July – The Time Tunnel (1966–1967)
- 15 July – Ukridge (1968)
- 28 July – The Man in the Iron Mask (1968)
- 31 July – Dad's Army (1968–1977)
- 30 August – The Old Campaigner (1968–1969)
- 9 September – Hector's House (1968–1975)
- 12 September – Sportsnight (1968–1997)
- 13 September – Oh Brother! (1968–1970)
- 15 September – Song of Summer (1968)
- 29 September – The £1,000,000 Bank Note (1968)
- 2 November – Zokko! (1968–1970)
- 3 November – Treasure Island (1968)
- 18 November – Tom's Midnight Garden (1968)
- 25 December – The Harry Secombe Show (1968–1973)
- 30 December – Adventure Weekly (1968–1969)

=== BBC2 ===
- 5 January – Gardeners' World (1968–present)
- 15 January – Look and Read: Len and the River Mob (1968)
- 22 January – The World of Beachcomber (1968–1969)
- 2 March – Point Counter Point (1968)
- 6 April – Ooh La La! (1968–1973)
- 19 April – Late Night Horror (1968)
- 29 April – Marty (1968–1969)
- 14 June – Colour Me Pop (1968–1969)
- 22 June – Cold Comfort Farm (1968)
- 5 July – The Expert (1968–1976)
- 13 July – Middlemarch (1968)
- 29 July – The Year of the Sex Olympics (1968) (first shown in Theatre 625 series)
- 31 August – Nana (1968)
- 2 September – The Morecambe & Wise Show (1968–1977)
- 8 September – Rowan & Martin's Laugh-In (1968–1973)
- 10 September – The Jazz Age (1968) (Anthology series)
- 11 September – A Touch of Venus (1968) (Anthology shorts)
- 27 September – Scene (1968–2002) (Anthology series)
- 10 October – Jazz at the Maltings (1968–1969)
- 28 October – Broaden Your Mind (1968–1969)
- 16 November – Resurrection (1968)
- 28 December – The Tenant of Wildfell Hall (1968–1969)
- 31 December – The Borderers (1968–1970)

=== ITV ===
- 4 January – A Man of our Times (1968)
- 5 February – Rogues' Gallery (1968–1969)
- 28 February – The Flight of the Heron (1968)
- 28 March – Virgin of the Secret Service (1968)
- 3 April – The Ronnie Barker Playhouse (1968)
- 4 April – Freewheelers (1968–1973)
- 19 April – Spindoe (1968)
- 17 June – Devil-in-the-Fog (1968)
- 12 July – The War of Darkie Pilbeam (1968)
- 30 July – Magpie (1968–1980)
- 31 July – Frontier (1968)
- 1 August – The Queen Street Gang (1968)
- 2 August – Gazette (1968)
- 6 August – Best of Enemies (1968)
- 10 August – Never a Cross Word (1968–1970)
- 15 August – Nearest and Dearest (1968–1973)
- 19 August – Lost in Space
- 21 August – Tom Grattan's War (1968–1970)
- 25 August – The Big Match (1968–1992)
- 22 September – The Caesars (1968)
- 24 September
  - How We Used To Live (1968–2002)
  - Inside George Webley (1968–1970)
- 25 September
  - The Champions (1968–1969)
  - Her Majesty's Pleasure (1968–1969)
- 29 September – Joe 90 (1968–1969)
- 1 October – The Root of All Evil? (1968–1969)
- 28 October – Houseparty (1968–1981; 1993–1995)
- November – Sugarball The Jungle Boy (1968–1969)
- 5 November – Father, Dear Father (1968–1973)
- 8 November – Please Sir! (1968–1972)
- 16 November – Journey to the Unknown (1968–1969)
- 5 December – High Living (1968–1971)
- 7 December – Land of the Giants (1968–1970)

== Television shows ==
=== Returning this year after a break of one year or longer ===
- Scott On (1964–1965; 1968–1972; 1974)

== Continuing television shows ==
=== 1920s ===
- BBC Wimbledon (1927–1939, 1946–2019, 2021–2024)

=== 1930s ===
- Trooping the Colour (1937–1939, 1946–2019, 2023–present)
- The Boat Race (1938–1939, 1946–2019, 2021–present)
- BBC Cricket (1939, 1946–1999, 2020–2024)

=== 1940s ===
- The Ed Sullivan Show (1948–1971)
- Come Dancing (1949–1998)

=== 1950s ===
- Andy Pandy (1950–1970, 2002–2005)
- Watch with Mother (1952–1975)
- The Good Old Days (1953–1983)
- Panorama (1953–present)
- Dixon of Dock Green (1955–1976)
- Crackerjack (1955–1970, 1972–1984, 2020–2021)
- Opportunity Knocks (1956–1978, 1987–1990)
- This Week (1956–1978, 1986–1992)
- Armchair Theatre (1956–1974)
- What the Papers Say (1956–2008)
- The Sky at Night (1957–present)
- Blue Peter (1958–present)
- Grandstand (1958–2007)

=== 1960s ===
- Coronation Street (1960–present)
- The Avengers (1961–1969)
- Songs of Praise (1961–present)
- The Saint (1962–1969)
- Z-Cars (1962–1978)
- Animal Magic (1962–1983)
- Doctor Who (1963–1989, 1996, 2005–present)
- World in Action (1963–1998)
- The Wednesday Play (1964–1970)
- Top of the Pops (1964–2006)
- Match of the Day (1964–present)
- Crossroads (1964–1988, 2001–2003)
- Play School (1964–1988)
- Mr. and Mrs. (1965–1999)
- The Newcomers (1965–1969)
- Public Eye (1965–1975)
- World of Sport (1965–1985)
- Sportsnight (1965–1997)
- Mystery and Imagination (1966–1970)
- Softly, Softly (1966–1969)
- The Trumptonshire Trilogy (1966–1969)
- Jackanory (1965–1996, 2006)
- It's a Knockout (1966–1982, 1999–2001)
- The Money Programme (1966–2010)
- Market in Honey Lane (1967–1969)
- Not in Front of the Children (1967–1970)
- Never Mind the Quality, Feel the Width (1967–1971)
- The Golden Shot (1967–1975)
- Playhouse (1967–1982)
- Reksio (1967–1990)

== Ending this year ==
- Take Your Pick! (1955–1968, 1992–1998)
- Double Your Money (1955–1968)
- ITV Wimbledon (1956–1968)
- White Heather Club (1958–1968)
- Danger Man (1960–1961, 1964–1968)
- Theatre 625 (1964–1968)
- Beggar My Neighbour (1966–1968)
- At Last the 1948 Show (1967–1968)
- Captain Scarlet and the Mysterons (1967–1968)
- Man in a Suitcase (1967–1968)
- Pinky and Perky (1967–1968)
- The Prisoner (1967–1968)

== Births ==
- 30 January – Tony Maudsley, actor
- 3 February – David Scarboro, actor (died 1988)
- 29 February – Wendi Peters, actress
- 4 March – Patsy Kensit, English actress
- 11 March – Dominic Mafham, actor
- 21 March – Jaye Davidson, British actor
- 23 March – Abigail Cruttenden, actress
- 3 April – Charlotte Coleman, actress (died 2001)
- 8 April – Jenny Powell, television presenter
- 17 April – Lee Whitlock, actor (died 2023)
- 22 April – Amanda Mealing, actress
- 23 April – Ricky Groves, actor
- 4 May – Julian Barratt, comedian and actor
- 10 May – Rhodri Williams, Welsh sports presenter
- 15 May – Sophie Raworth, journalist and newsreader
- 22 May – Graham Linehan, Irish writer and director
- 7 June – Sarah Parish, actress
- 28 June – Adam Woodyatt, actor
- 20 July – Julian Rhind-Tutt, film, television and radio actor
- 26 July – Olivia Williams, actress
- 4 August – Lee Mack, comedian and actor
- 5 August – Stephanie Flanders, broadcast journalist
- 9 August
  - Gillian Anderson, British actress (born in the U.S.)
  - Kate Gerbeau, television presenter and newsreader
- 11 August – Gray O'Brien, actor
- 14 August – Adrian Lester, British actor
- 17 August – Helen McCrory, actress (died 2021)
- 20 August – Sharat Sardana, comedy scriptwriter (died 2009)
- 21 August – Laura Trevelyan, BBC journalist
- 1 September – Matt Brittin, BBC Director-General
- 8 September – Louise Minchin, news presenter
- 9 September – Julia Sawalha, English actress, sister of Nadia Sawalha
- 20 September – Philippa Forrester, British TV presenter
- 23 September – Yvette Fielding, television presenter and actress
- 28 September – Shiulie Ghosh, television journalist
- 1 October – Mark Durden-Smith, British television presenter
- 2 October – Victoria Derbyshire, radio and television presenter
- 19 October – Kacey Ainsworth, British actress
- 20 October – Susan Tully, television producer and director, previously actress
- 12 November – Jo Coburn, journalist and broadcaster
- 22 November
  - Andrew Gilligan, British journalist
  - Sarah Smith, Scottish journalist
- 23 November – Kirsty Young, television presenter
- 12 December – Kate Humble, television presenter
- 18 December – Nina Wadia, actress and comedian
- Unknown – Melanie Stace, television presenter

== See also ==
- 1968 in British music
- 1968 in British radio
- 1968 in the United Kingdom
- List of British films of 1968
