= List of early colour TV shows in the UK =

Below is a list of early colour TV shows produced in the UK between the late 1950s up to 1970, by which point the majority of programmes were being produced in colour. The list features titles of shows, TV companies, transmission dates, formats and their archival status; noting whether they are lost, partially or mostly missing or have episodes that exist in B&W. Also included are some programmes which had one-off transmissions, where applicable.

BBC2 was the first European broadcaster to show colour programmes from 1 July 1967, ahead of ITV and BBC1, who both began broadcasting in colour from 15 November 1969. This list includes shows that were recorded in colour but whose first UK broadcast was in black-and-white; most of these shows were sold to US networks who were already broadcasting in colour.

== Pre-1966 ==
Title	Company	TX	Format	Archival status
The Adventures of Sir Lancelot	ITC Entertainment	1956–57	Film (various stocks for experimentation)	Exists
Ivanhoe	ITV (Screen Gems/Sydney Box)	1958–59 (pilot episode only)	Film	Exists
Journey of a Lifetime	ABC	1961	Film	Exists
Man of the World	ATV	1962–63 (pilot episode only)	Film	Exists
Stingray	ITC Entertainment	1964–65	Film	Exists
Thunderbirds	ITC Entertainment	1965–66	Film	Exists

== 1966 ==
Title	Company	TX	Format	Archival status
The Baron	ITC Entertainment	1966–67	Film	Exists
Camberwick Green	BBC1	1966	Film	Exists
Dare I Weep, Dare I Mourn	Rediffusion	1966	Film	Exists
Hippodrome Show	ITV (Rediffusion/ARTV)	1966	Video tape (VT)	All episodes (Note: The first in a series of shows ARTV filmed in NTSC colour for US transmission, though shown in monochrome in the UK.)
The Human Voice	Rediffusion	1966–67	VTR	Exists
Ivanov	ITC Entertainment	1966	VTR	Existence unknown
The Palladium Show	ITV (ATV)	1966–69 (1 test episode + 6 for US transmission)	VT	Some exist
The Saint	ITC Entertainment	1962–69 (Series 5–6)	Film	Exists
The Tormentors	ATV	1966	VTR	Exists

== 1967 ==
Title	Company	TX	Format	Archival status
The Avengers	ITV (ABC/Thames)	1961–69 (Series 5–6)	Film	All colour episodes exist
The Benny Hill Show	ATV	1967	VTR	Existence unknown
The Black and White Minstrel Show	BBC2	1958–78 (Series 10–20)	VT	Some episodes exist
Captain Scarlet and the Mysterons	ITC Entertainment	1967–68	Film	Exists
The Flower of Gloster	ITV (Granada)	1967	Film	Exists
Half Hour Story	ITV (Rediffusion)	1967–68 (1 test episode)	Film	Exists
Horizon	BBC2	1964–present (Series 4 onwards)	Film/VT	Most episodes exist
Late Night Line-Up	BBC2	1964–72 (Jun 67 onwards)	VT	Some episodes exist
Man in a Suitcase	ITC Entertainment	1967–68	Film	Exists
Once More with Felix	BBC2	1967–70	VT	Some episodes exist (Note: Some episodes survive as inserts recorded by Bob Pratt; one complete episode survives as a B&W tele-recording.)
The Piccadilly Palace	ITV (ATV)	1967	VT	Some episodes exist (Note: Filmed in NTSC for US transmission, the series was shown in B&W in the UK.)
The Prisoner	ITC Entertainment	1967–68	Film	Exists
The Small Rebellion of Jess Calvert (play)	Rediffusion	1967	VT/Film.. experimental electronic film system	Existence unknown
Spotlight	ATV/ITC	1967	VT	Exists
Theatre 625	BBC2	1964–68 (Series 5)	VT	Some episodes exist
Trumpton	BBC1	1967	Film	Exists
Vanity Fair	BBC2	1967–68	VT	Exists (Note: The majority of episodes survive as NTSC copies.)
Wimbledon Tennis Championships	BBC1/2	1937–present (1967 onwards)	VT	Most colour transmissions exist

== 1968 ==
Title	Company	TX	Format	Archival status
1968 Summer Olympics	BBC1/2	1968	VT	Exists
The Big Show aka Showtime	ATV/ITC	1968	VT	Exists
Bobbie Gentry	BBC2	1968–71	VT	Some episodes exist
Broaden Your Mind	BBC2	1968–69	VT	Lost (Note: Some 35mm colour film inserts exist.)
Call My Bluff	BBC2	1965–2005	VT	Most episodes
The Champions	ITC Entertainment	1968–69	Film	Exists
Cold Comfort Farm	BBC2	1968	VT	Exists
Colour Me Pop	BBC2	1968–69	VT	Some episodes exist (Note: Three complete episodes survive in colour; an incomplete episode also exists.)
Danger Man	ITC Entertainment	1960–68 (Series 4)	Film	Exists
The Dave Allen Show	BBC1/2	1968–69	VT	Most episodes exist
Eurovision Song Contest	Various	1957–present (1968 onwards)	VT	Most transmissions exist (Note: Parts of the 1970 contest exist in monochrome.)
Frontier	ABC (UK)	1968	VT	Existence unknown
Gardeners' World	BBC2	1968–present	VT	Most episodes exist
Goodbye Again	ITV (ATV)	1968	VT	Exists
The Growing Summer	LWT	1968	film	Existence unknown
Horne A'Plenty Xmas show	Thames	1968	VT	Existence unknown
In Their Own Words	BBC2	1968	Film	Exist
Jazz at the Maltings	BBC2	1968–69	VT	Some episodes exist
Joe 90	ITC Entertainment	1968–69	Film	Exists
Journey to the Unknown	Hammer/Twentieth Century Fox	1968	film	Exists
Late Night Horror	BBC2	1968	VT	One episode exists
Man Alive	BBC2	1965–82 (Series 3–16)	Film/VT	Most episodes exist
Marty	BBC2	1968–69	VT	Most episodes exist
The Morecambe & Wise Show	BBC1/2	1968–77	VT	Most episodes exist
One Pair of Eyes	BBC2	1967–84 (Series 2 onwards)	Film	Exists
Ooh La La	BBC2	1968–73	VT	Series 3 only
Scott On...	BBC2	1964–74 (Series 2–5)	VT	Some episodes exist
Sherlock Holmes	BBC2	1965–68 (Series 2)	VT	Some episodes exist
Tom Gratton's War	YTV	1968–70	film	Exists
The World of Beachcomber	BBC2	1968	VT	Lost

== 1969 ==
Title	Company	TX	Format	Archival status
All Gas and Gaiters	BBC1	1967–71 (Series 3–5)	VT	Some episodes exist
The Big Match	ITV	1968–92 (Nov 69 onwards)	VT	Most episodes exist
Chigley	BBC1	1969	Film	Exists
Cilla	BBC1	1968–76 (Series 3–8)	VT	Most episodes exist
Civilisation	BBC2	1969	Film	Exists
Coronation Street	ITV (Granada)	1960–present (Nov 69 onwards)	VT	Exists
Crossroads	ITV (ATV/Central)	1964–88 (Nov 69 onwards)	VT	Most episodes exist (Note: Some 1970–1 episodes were affected by the ITV Colour Strike.)
Curry and Chips	ITV (LWT)	1969	VT	Exists
Dad's Army	BBC1	1968–77 (Series 3–9)	VT	Most colour episodes exist (Note: The episode "Room at the Bottom" only survives as a B&W telerecording.)
Dee Time	BBC1	1967–70 (Nov 69 onwards)	VT	No colour episodes exist
Department S	ITC Entertainment	1969–70	Film	Exists
The Dick Emery Show	BBC1	1963–81 (Dec 69 onwards)	VT	Most episodes exist
Dixon of Dock Green	BBC1	1955–76 (Nov 69 onwards)	VT	Some episodes exist
Doctor in the House	ITV (LWT)	1969–70	VT	Exists
The Flaxton Boys	YTV (Yorkshire)	1969–71	VT	Exists
From a Bird's Eye View	ITC Entertainment	1969	Film	Exists
Frost on Sunday	ITV (LWT)	1968–70 (Oct 69 onwards)	VT	Most episodes exist
Girls About Town	ITV (ATV)	1969–71	VT	One colour episode exists
The Gnomes of Dulwich	BBC2	1969	VT	Lost
The Golden Shot	ITV (ATV)	1967–75 (Nov 69 onwards)	VT	Some episodes exist (Note: Some episodes recovered from domestic videotape copies, courtesy of presenter, Bob Monkhouse.)
The Good Old Days	BBC1	1953–83 (Dec 69 onwards)	VT	Most episodes exist
Grandstand	BBC1	1958–2007 (Nov 69 onwards)	VT	Most episodes exist
Hadleigh	ITV (Yorkshire)	1969–76	VT	Exists (Note: Episodes 1, 2, 8, 9 and 13 of series two were shown in monochrome owing to the ITV Colour Strike.)
The Liberace Show	ATV	1969	VT	Some episodes exist
Lift Off with Ayshea	ITV (Granada)	1969–74	VT	Some episodes exist
Magpie	ITV (Thames)	1968–80 (Nov 69 onwards)	VT	Some episodes exist
Male of the Species	ATV/ITC	1969	VT	Exists
Match of the Day	BBC1/2	1964 – present (Nov 69 onwards)	VT	Most episodes exist
Monty Python's Flying Circus	BBC1	1969–74	VT	Exists
Mr Digby Darling	ITV (Yorkshire)	1969–71 (Series 2–3)	VT	Exists
Nearest and Dearest	ITV (Granada)	1968–73 (Series 3–7)	VT	Exists
Not in Front of the Children	BBC1	1967–70 (Series 4)	VT	Some episodes exist
Out of the Unknown	BBC2	1965–71 (Series 3–4)	VT	Some episodes exist (Note: Some surviving colour episodes survive as B&W tele-recordings.)
Panorama	BBC1	1953–present (Nov 69 onwards)	VT	Most episodes exist
Parkin's Patch	ITV (Yorkshire)	1969–70	VT	Exists
Paul Temple	BBC1/ ZDF	1969–71	VT	Some episodes exist
Please Sir!	ITV (LWT)	1968–72 (Series 2–4)	VT	Exists (Note: Episodes 12–14 of series 3 were taped in monochrome, due to the ITV Colour Strike.)
Pop Go the Sixties	BBC1/ ZDF	TX: 31/12/1969	VT	Exists
Pot Black	BBC2	1969–2007	VT	Most episodes exist (Note: A large number of episodes are missing from series 1–8.)
Prince Charles Investiture	BBC2	TX: 1/7/1969	VT	Exists
Public Eye	ITV (ABC/ Thames)	1965–72 (Series 4–7)	VT/Film	All colour episodes exist (Note: Episodes 1–3, 6 and 12 of Series 5 were shot in monochrome due to the ITV Colour Strike.)
Q...	BBC2	1969–82	VT	Most episodes exist
Randall and Hopkirk (Deceased)	ITC Entertainment	1969–70	Film	Exists
The Secret Service	ITC Entertainment	1969	Film	Exists
Sez Les	ITV (Yorkshire)	1969–76 (Series 2–11)	VT	Series 3–11 exists
The Sky at Night	BBC1	1957–present (Dec 69 onwards)	VT	Most episodes
Softly, Softly: Task Force	BBC1	1969–76	VT	Exists
The Sooty Show	ITV (Thames)	1968–92 (Dec 69 onwards)	VT	Most episodes
Strange Report	ITC Entertainment	1969–70	Film	Exists
Take Three Girls	BBC1	1969–71	VT	Some episodes
This Is Tom Jones	ITV (ATV)	1969–71	VT	Exists
This Is Your Life	ITV (Thames)/ BBC1	1955–64, 1969–2003, 2007 (Series 10 onwards)	VT	Most episodes
Tomorrow's World	BBC1	1965–2003 (1970 onwards)	VT	Most episodes (Note: The majority of colour episodes are lost prior to 1981.)
Top of the Pops	BBC1/2	1964–2006 (Nov 69 onwards)	VT	Most episodes
Up Pompeii!	BBC1/ ITV (Thames)	1969–91	VT	Exists (Note: All episodes survive as NTSC copies.)
The Wednesday Play	BBC1	1964–70 (Nov 69 onwards)	VT/Film	Most episodes
Where Was Spring?	BBC2	1969–70	VT	Lost
World of Sport	ITV	1965–85 (Nov 69 onwards)	VT	Most episodes
The Worker	ITV (ATV/Thames)	1965–78 (Series 3–5)	VT	Most episodes (Note: Series 5 consists of short sketches that featured on Bruce Forsyth's Big Night (1978–80). Some of the episodes have been recovered from VHS recordings.)
World in Ferment	BBC2	1969	VT	Audio only

== 1970 ==
Title	Company	TX	Format	Archival status
The Adventures of Rupert Bear	ITC Entertainment	1970–77	Film	Exists
Albert and Victoria	ITV (Yorkshire)	1970–71	VT	Exists
Armchair Theatre	ITV (ABC/ Thames)	1956–74 (Series 10–16)	VT	Most episodes
Bachelor Father	BBC1	1970–71	VT	Exists
Barry Humphries' Scandals	BBC2	1970	VT	Lost
Blue Peter	BBC1	1958–present (Sept 70 onwards)	VT	Most episodes
Braden's Week	BBC1	1968–72 (Series 3–4)	VT	Some episodes
Callan	ITV (ABC/ Thames)	1967–72 (Series 3–4)	VT	All colour episodes
Dear Mother...Love Albert	ITV (Thames/ Yorkshire)	1969–72	VT	Series 2–4 (Note: Series 3 was shot in monochrome, owing to the ITV Colour Strike.)
Disco 2	BBC2	1970–1	VT	Some episodes (Note: Some surviving episodes survive as B&W tele-recordings.)
Doctor Who	BBC1	1963 – present (Season 7 onwards)	Film/VT	All colour episodes (Note: Some colour episodes survive as NTSC copies, off-air tapes and B&W tele-recordings with chroma dots. Only one colour episode, The Mind of Evil episode one, has no surviving authentic colour image data – this episode has been recolourised.)First serial on film only.
Dr. Finlay's Casebook	BBC1	1962–71 (Series 8)	VT	Some episodes
The Dustbinmen	ITV (Granada)	1969–70 (Series 3–4)	VT	Most episodes
A Family at War	ITV (Granada)	1970–72	VT	Exists (Note: Episodes 12–19 of series 2 were affected by ITV Colour Strike.)
Father Dear Father	ITV (Thames)	1968–73 (Series 3–7)	VT	Exists
FIFA World Cup – 1970	BBC/ ITV	1970	VT	Most transmissions exist
For the Love of Ada	ITV (LWT)	1970–71	VT	Exists
Freewheelers	ITV (Southern)	1968–73 Series 4–8	VT	Most episodes
The Goodies	BBC2/ ITV (LWT)	1970–82	VT	Most episodes
Hark at Barker	ITV (LWT)	1969–70 Series 2	VT	Exists (Note: One episode, "Rustless on Law" (TX: 17/7/1970), survives a B&W tele-recording.)
How!	ITV (Southern)	1966–81 (Series 4–17)	VT	Some episodes
It's Cliff Richard!	BBC1	1970–76	VT	Most episodes (Note: Some episodes exist as B&W tele-recordings.)
Jokers Wild	ITV (Yorkshire)	1969–74 (Series 2–9)	VT	Exists
The Kenny Everett Explosion	ITV (LWT)	1970	VT	Fragment exists
The Lovers	ITV (Granada)	1970–71	VT	Exists
Manhunt	ITV (LWT)	1970	VT	Exists
The Misfit	ITV (ATV)	1970–71	VT	Exists (Note: All episodes survive as B&W tele-recordings.)
Never Mind the Quality, Feel the Width	ITV (ABC/ Thames)	1967–71 (Series 4–6)	VT	Exists
No – That's Me Over Here!	ITV (Rediffusion/LWT) (Series 3)	1967–70	VT	Series 3 only
Not Only... But Also	BBC2	1965–70 (Series 3)	VT	16mm colour film inserts exist
Oh, Brother!	BBC1	1968–70 (Series 3)	VT	All colour episodes exist
Oh In Colour	BBC2	1970	VT	Exists
On the Buses	ITV (LWT)	1969–73 (Series 3–7)	VT	Exists
Play for Today	BBC1	1970–84	VT/Film	Most episodes (Note: Some episodes from series 1–5 are missing; a few exist as B&W tele-recordings.)
Queenie's Castle	ITV (Yorkshire)	1970–72	VT	Exists
A Question of Sport	BBC1	1968–2023 (Series 1 onwards)	VT	Most episodes
Steptoe and Son	BBC1	1962–65, 1970–74 (Series 5–8)	VT	Exists
That's Your Funeral	BBC1	1970–1	VT	Exists
Till Death Us Do Part	BBC1	1965–75 (Election Special onwards)	VT	Most episodes
Timeslip	ITV (ATV)	1970–71	VT	Exists (Note: All but one episode survives as B&W tele-recordings.)
Two in Clover	ITV (Thames)	1969–70 (Series 2)	VT	Exists
UFO	ITC Entertainment	1970	Film	Exists
Z-Cars	BBC1	1962–65, 1967–78 (Series 6–12)	VT	Some episodes (Note: Some colour episodes exist as B&W tele-recordings.)
