= List of British films of 1968 =

British films released in 1968

A list of films produced in the United Kingdom in 1968 (see 1968 in film):

== 1968 ==
Title	Director	Cast	Genre	Notes
2001: A Space Odyssey	Stanley Kubrick	Keir Dullea, Gary Lockwood, William Sylvester	Science fiction	Co-production with US
All Neat in Black Stockings	Christopher Morahan	Victor Henry, Susan George, Jack Shepherd	Comedy drama	
Amsterdam Affair	Gerry O'Hara	Wolfgang Kieling, William Marlowe, Catherine Schell	Crime	
The Anniversary	Roy Ward Baker	Bette Davis, Jack Henley, Sheila Hancock	Drama	
Assignment K	Val Guest	Stephen Boyd, Michael Redgrave, Camilla Sparv	Thriller	
Attack on the Iron Coast	Paul Wendkos	Lloyd Bridges, Andrew Keir, Sue Lloyd	War	Co-production with US
Baby Love	Alastair Reid	Ann Lynn, Keith Barron, Linda Hayden, Diana Dors	Drama	
The Big Switch	Pete Walker	Virginia Wetherell, Jack Allen, Douglas Blackwell	Crime	
The Birthday Party	William Friedkin	Robert Shaw, Patrick Magee, Sydney Tafler	Drama	
The Bliss of Mrs. Blossom	Joseph McGrath	Shirley MacLaine, Richard Attenborough, James Booth	Comedy	
The Blood Beast Terror	Vernon Sewell	Peter Cushing, Robert Flemyng, Wanda Ventham	Horror	
The Blood of Fu Manchu	Jesús Franco	Christopher Lee, Richard Greene, Maria Rohm	Crime	International co-production
The Bofors Gun	Jack Gold	Nicol Williamson, Ian Holm, David Warner	Drama	
Boom!	Joseph Losey	Elizabeth Taylor, Richard Burton, Noël Coward	Drama	
Carry On Up the Khyber	Gerald Thomas	Sid James, Kenneth Williams, Joan Sims	Comedy	Number 99 in the list of BFI Top 100 British films
The Charge of the Light Brigade	Tony Richardson	Trevor Howard, Vanessa Redgrave, David Hemmings	War	
Charlie Bubbles	Albert Finney	Albert Finney, Billie Whitelaw, Liza Minnelli	Drama	
Chitty Chitty Bang Bang	Ken Hughes	Dick Van Dyke, Sally Ann Howes, Lionel Jeffries	Fantasy musical	
Corruption	Robert Hartford-Davis	Peter Cushing, Sue Lloyd, Kate O'Mara	Horror	
Curse of the Crimson Altar	Vernon Sewell	Christopher Lee, Boris Karloff, Barbara Steele	Horror	
A Dandy in Aspic	Anthony Mann	Laurence Harvey, Tom Courtenay, Mia Farrow	Spy thriller	
Deadfall	Bryan Forbes	Michael Caine, Eric Portman, Giovanna Ralli	Crime thriller	
Decline and Fall	John Krish	Robin Phillips, Geneviève Page, Colin Blakely	Comedy	
The Devil Rides Out	Terence Fisher	Christopher Lee, Charles Gray, Patrick Mower	Horror	
Diamonds for Breakfast	Christopher Morahan	Marcello Mastroianni, Rita Tushingham, Elaine Taylor	Comedy heist	
Don't Raise the Bridge, Lower the River	Jerry Paris	Jerry Lewis, Terry-Thomas, Jacqueline Pearce	Comedy	
Dracula Has Risen from the Grave	Freddie Francis	Christopher Lee, Rupert Davies, Veronica Carlson	Horror	
Duffy	Robert Parrish	James Coburn, James Mason, James Fox	Comedy crime	Co-production with the US
Eve	Jeremy Summers	Celeste Yarnall, Robert Walker, Christopher Lee	Adventure	International co-production
The Fixer	John Frankenheimer	Alan Bates, Dirk Bogarde, Hugh Griffith	Drama	
The Girl on a Motorcycle	Jack Cardiff	Marianne Faithfull, Alain Delon, Marius Goring	Drama	Co-production with France
Great Catherine	Gordon Flemyng	Peter O'Toole, Jeanne Moreau, Jack Hawkins	Historical comedy	
Hammerhead	David Miller	Vince Edwards, Judy Geeson, Peter Vaughan	Spy thriller	
The Hand of Night	Frederic Goode	William Sylvester, Diane Clare, Edward Underdown	Horror	
Here We Go Round the Mulberry Bush	Clive Donner	Barry Evans, Judy Geeson, Sheila White	Comedy	
Hostile Witness	Ray Milland	Ray Milland, Sylvia Syms, Raymond Huntley	Drama	
Hot Millions	Eric Till	Peter Ustinov, Karl Malden, Maggie Smith, Bob Newhart	Comedy	
if....	Lindsay Anderson	Malcolm McDowell, David Wood, Arthur Lowe	Counterculture	Number 12 in the list of BFI Top 100 British films
Inadmissible Evidence	Anthony Page	Nicol Williamson, Eleanor Fazan, Jill Bennett	Drama	
Inspector Clouseau	Bud Yorkin	Alan Arkin, Frank Finlay, Barry Foster	Comedy	Co-production with US
Interlude	Kevin Billington	Oskar Werner, Barbara Ferris, Virginia Maskell	Drama	Remake of 1957 film
Isadora	Karel Reisz	Vanessa Redgrave, James Fox, Jason Robards	Biopic	Redgrave won Best Actress at the 1969 Cannes Film Festival.
Joanna	Michael Sarne	Geneviève Waïte, Christian Doermer, Calvin Lockhart	Drama	Was due to be entered into the 1968 Cannes Film Festival
Last of the Long-haired Boys	Peter Everett	Richard Todd, Gillian Raine, Malcolm Tierney	Drama	
The Limbo Line	Samuel Gallu	Craig Stevens, Kate O'Mara, Eugene Deckers	Spy thriller	
The Lion in Winter	Anthony Harvey	Peter O'Toole, Katharine Hepburn, Anthony Hopkins	Historical drama	Winner of three Academy Awards
The Long Day's Dying	Peter Collinson	David Hemmings, Tony Beckley, Tom Bell	War	
The Lost Continent	Michael Carreras	Eric Porter, Hildegard Knef, Suzanna Leigh	Adventure	
Loving Feeling	Norman J. Warren	Georgina Ward, Simon Brent, Françoise Pascal	Drama	
The Magus	Guy Green	Michael Caine, Anthony Quinn, Anna Karina	Mystery	
Mayerling	Terence Young	Omar Sharif, Catherine Deneuve, James Mason	Romantic drama	Co-production with France. Based on the Mayerling incident
The Mercenaries	Jack Cardiff	Rod Taylor, Yvette Mimieux, Jim Brown	War	Released as Dark of the Sun in the US
A Midsummer Night's Dream	Peter Hall	Derek Godfrey, Ian Holm, Helen Mirren	Comedy	
Mrs. Brown, You've Got a Lovely Daughter	Saul Swimmer	Stanley Holloway, Peter Noone, Sheila White	Musical	
Negatives	Peter Medak	Peter McEnery, Diane Cilento, Glenda Jackson	Drama	
Nobody Runs Forever	Ralph Thomas	Rod Taylor, Christopher Plummer, Lilli Palmer	Thriller	
Oedipus the King	Philip Saville	Christopher Plummer, Lilli Palmer, Orson Welles, Richard Johnson	Historical drama	
Oliver!	Carol Reed	Mark Lester, Ron Moody, Shani Wallis, Oliver Reed, Harry Secombe, Jack Wild	Musical	Number 77 in the list of BFI Top 100 British films. Winner of six Academy Awards including Best Picture, 2 Golden Globe Awards and a Special Prize at Moscow.
Only When I Larf	Basil Dearden	Richard Attenborough, David Hemmings, Alexandra Stewart	Comedy crime	Based on Len Deighton's novel
Otley	Dick Clement	Tom Courtenay, Romy Schneider, James Villiers	Spy comedy	
Petulia	Richard Lester	Julie Christie, George C. Scott, Richard Chamberlain	Drama	
Praise Marx and Pass the Ammunition	Maurice Hatton	John Thaw, Edina Ronay, Louis Mahoney	Comedy	
Prudence and the Pill	Fielder Cook, Ronald Neame	Deborah Kerr, David Niven, Irina Demick	Comedy	
Romeo and Juliet	Franco Zeffirelli	Leonard Whiting, Olivia Hussey, Michael York	Literary drama	Co-production with Italy. Adaptation of Shakespeare's play
Salt and Pepper	Richard Donner	Sammy Davis, Jr., Peter Lawford, John Le Mesurier	Comedy	
The Sea Gull	Sidney Lumet	James Mason, Vanessa Redgrave, Simone Signoret	Drama	Co-production with the US
Sebastian	David Greene	Dirk Bogarde, Susannah York, Lilli Palmer	Spy thriller	
Secret Ceremony	Joseph Losey	Elizabeth Taylor, Mia Farrow, Robert Mitchum,	Thriller	
Shalako	Edward Dmytryk	Sean Connery, Brigitte Bardot, Jack Hawkins	Western	International co-production
The Strange Affair	David Greene	Michael York, Jeremy Kemp, Susan George	Crime drama	
Submarine X-1	William Graham	James Caan, David Sumner, Norman Bowler	War	
Subterfuge	Peter Graham Scott	Gene Barry, Joan Collins, Richard Todd	Spy thriller	
Thunderbird 6	David Lane	Keith Alexander, Sylvia Anderson, Peter Dyneley	Science fiction	Puppet film
The Touchables	Robert Freeman	Judy Huxtable, Esther Anderson, James Villiers	Comedy drama	
Twisted Nerve	Roy Boulting	Hywel Bennett, Hayley Mills, Billie Whitelaw	Thriller	
A Twist of Sand	Don Chaffey	Richard Johnson, Honor Blackman, Jeremy Kemp	Adventure	
Up the Junction	Peter Collinson	Dennis Waterman, Suzy Kendall, Adrienne Posta	Drama	
The Vengeance of She	Cliff Owen	John Richardson, Olga Schoberová, Edward Judd	Fantasy	
Where Eagles Dare	Brian G. Hutton	Richard Burton, Clint Eastwood, Mary Ure	War	
Witchfinder General	Michael Reeves	Vincent Price, Ian Ogilvy, Hilary Dwyer	Horror	
Wonderwall	Joe Massot	Jack MacGowran, Jane Birkin, Richard Wattis	Drama	
Work Is a Four-Letter Word	Peter Hall	David Warner, Cilla Black, Zia Mohyeddin	Comedy	
Yellow Submarine	George Dunning	The Beatles, Paul Angelis, John Clive	Musical	

== Documentaries and short films ==
Title	Director	Cast	Genre	Notes
Les Bicyclettes de Belsize	Douglas Hickox	Judy Huxtable, Anthony May	Musical	Short film
The Intrepid Mr. Twigg	Freddie Francis	Roy Castle, Clovissa Newcombe	Comedy	Short film
The Committee	Peter Sykes	Arthur Brown, Paul Jones	Drama	
Tell Me Lies	Peter Brook	Mark Jones, Pauline Munro	Drama	

== See also ==
- 1968 in British music
- 1968 in British radio
- 1968 in British television
- 1968 in the United Kingdom
