= 1968 in British radio =

This is a list of events in British radio during 1968.

== Events ==
- 4 February – BBC Radio Nottingham broadcasts the UK's first ever radio phone-in, What Are They Up To Now, hosted by Tony Church.
- 18 July – The BBC Proms season opens for the first time on a Friday evening, with a tribute to the late Sir Malcolm Sargent.
- 21 August – Protests are heard at tonight's BBC Proms concert by the USSR Symphony Orchestra against the Warsaw Pact invasion of Czechoslovakia.

== Station debuts ==
- 31 January – BBC Radio Nottingham
- 14 February – BBC Radio Brighton
- 14 March – BBC Radio Stoke
- 24 June – BBC Radio Leeds
- 3 July – BBC Radio Durham

== Programme debuts ==
- Undated – The Living World on BBC Radio 4 (1968–Present)
- 14 January – Brain of Britain (as an independent programme) on BBC Radio 2 (1968–Present)
- October – Helo Sut Dach Chi? presented by Hywel Gwynfryn on BBC Wales, the first Welsh-language pop radio programme
- 11 October – Follow This Space on BBC Radio 4 (1968–1969)

== Continuing radio programmes ==
=== 1940s ===
- Sunday Half Hour (1940–2018)
- Desert Island Discs (1942–Present)
- Family Favourites (1945–1980)
- Down Your Way (1946–1992)
- Letter from America (1946–2004)
- Woman's Hour (1946–Present)
- Twenty Questions (1947–1976)
- Any Questions? (1948–Present)
- The Dales (1948–1969)
- A Book at Bedtime (1949–Present)

=== 1950s ===
- The Archers (1950–Present)
- Listen with Mother (1950–1982)
- From Our Own Correspondent (1955–Present)
- Pick of the Pops (1955–Present)
- The Clitheroe Kid (1957–1972)
- My Word! (1957–1988)
- Test Match Special (1957–Present)
- The Today Programme (1957–Present)
- The Navy Lark (1959–1977)
- Sing Something Simple (1959–2001)
- Your Hundred Best Tunes (1959–2007)

=== 1960s ===
- Farming Today (1960–Present)
- In Touch (1961–Present)
- The Men from the Ministry (1962–1977)
- I'm Sorry, I'll Read That Again (1964–1973)
- Petticoat Line (1965–1979)
- The World at One (1965–Present)
- The Official Chart (1967–Present)
- Just a Minute (1967–Present)

== Ending this year ==
- 9 June – Round the Horne (1965–1968)
- 11 June – The Embassy Lark (1966–1968)
- July – Billy Cotton Band Show (1949–1968)

== Births ==
- 15 January – Alex Lowe, actor, comedian and voice artist
- 5 April – Stewart Lee, comedy writer-performer
- 16 May – Stephen Mangan, actor and presenter
- 2 June – John Culshaw, comic actor and impressionist
- 15 June – Samira Ahmed, arts journalist and broadcaster
- 20 July – Julian Rhind-Tutt, actor
- 2 October – Victoria Derbyshire, presenter
- 18 October – Rhod Gilbert, Welsh comedian and presenter
- Sonita Alleyne, media production company executive and college principal
- Chris Neill, comedy producer and performer
- Gary O'Donoghue, broadcast journalist
- Approximate date – Kit Green, comedy writer-performer

== Deaths ==
- 10 February – Mary O'Farrell, actress (born 1892)
- 24 June – Tony Hancock, comedian, suicide, in Australia (born 1924)
- 2 August – Beresford Clark, overseas broadcasting executive (born 1902)

== See also ==
- 1968 in British music
- 1968 in British television
- 1968 in the United Kingdom
- List of British films of 1968
