= 1968 in British music =

This is a summary of 1968 in music in the United Kingdom.

== Events ==
- 16 February – The Beatles, Mike Love, Mia Farrow, Donovan and others travel to India to visit Maharishi Mahesh Yogi at Rishikesh.
- 18 February – David Gilmour joins Pink Floyd, replacing founder Syd Barrett, who has checked himself into a psychiatric hospital.
- 1 March – First performance of an Andrew Lloyd Webber–Tim Rice musical, Joseph and the Amazing Technicolor Dreamcoat in its original form as a "pop cantata", by pupils of Colet Court preparatory school in Hammersmith.
- 30 March – The Yardbirds record their live album Live Yardbirds at the Anderson Theater.
- 6 April – The 13th Eurovision Song Contest is held in the Royal Albert Hall, London. The winning song, Spain's "La, la, la" is sung in Spanish by Massiel, after Spanish authorities refused to allow Joan Manuel Serrat to perform it in Catalan. The UK finish in second place, just one point behind, with the song "Congratulations" sung by Cliff Richard, which goes on to outsell the winning Spanish entry throughout Europe.
- 4 May – Mary Hopkin performs on the British TV show Opportunity Knocks. Hopkin catches the attention of model Twiggy, who recommends her to Paul McCartney. McCartney would soon sign Hopkin to Apple Records.
- 14 May – At a press conference, John Lennon and Paul McCartney introduce the Beatles' new business concept, Apple Corps, Ltd., a disastrously mismanaged entertainment company that includes a recording studio, a record label and clothing store.
- 30 May – The Beatles begin recording The White Album (officially titled, simply, The Beatles). Sessions will span over 4 months, ending on 14 October.
- 7 June – The first performance of Sir Malcolm Arnold's Peterloo overture, commissioned by the Trades Union Congress to make the centenary of its first meeting, takes place at London's Royal Festival Hall.
- 8 June – The première of Harrison Birtwistle's opera Punch and Judy takes place at the Jubilee Hall, Aldeburgh, during the Aldeburgh Festival.
- 14 June – Manfred Mann appear in the first edition of the BBC2 series Colour Me Pop.
- 7 July – The Yardbirds perform for the last time before disbanding.
- August – John McVie marries Christine Perfect.
- 4 August – Yes performs for the first time, at a summer camp.
- 12 August – At the Proms, three new works are performed in the first half: Thea Musgrave's Concerto for Orchestra (Proms premiere), John Tavener's In Alium (world premiere) and Don Banks' Violin Concerto (world premiere). The audience is asked to vote for a repeat in the second half. In Alium is the winner.
- 21 August – Russian cellist Mstislav Rostropovich plays Dvorak's Cello Concerto at the Proms, in an emotionally charged concert following the Soviet occupation of Prague the day before.
- 7 September – Led Zeppelin performs for the first time, billed as The New Yardbirds (the Yardbirds had disbanded two months earlier, and guitarist Jimmy Page subsequently formed this new group).
- 15 September – Song of Summer, Ken Russell's noted TV documentary about Frederick Delius, is shown for the first time as part of the BBC's Omnibus series.
- 19 September – The Who begin recording Tommy, a rock opera that tells the story about a deaf, dumb and blind boy, including his experiences with life and the relationship with his family.
- 8 November – John Lennon and his wife Cynthia are divorced.
- 22 November – The Beatles (also known as "The White Album") by The Beatles is released. Also released is The Kinks Are the Village Green Preservation Society by The Kinks.
- 26 November – Cream play their farewell concert at the Royal Albert Hall. It will be the last time Eric Clapton, Jack Bruce, and Ginger Baker play together until their 1993 induction into the Rock and Roll Hall of Fame.
- 2 December – Jimi Hendrix's manager Chas Chandler quits over differences with Hendrix during the recording of Electric Ladyland
- 6 December – The Rolling Stones release Beggars Banquet
- 22 December – The Animals reunite for one benefit concert at the Newcastle City Hall while Eric Burdon & The Animals are disbanding.
- date unknown
  - Patrick Harrex wins the BBC Composers' Competition.
  - Trojan Records is founded by Lee Gopthal.

== Charts ==
- See UK No.1 Hits of 1968

== Classical music ==
=== New works ===
- Benjamin Britten – Op. 82, Children's Crusade (words Bertolt Brecht/Hans Keller)
- Peter Maxwell Davies
  - Stedman Caters
  - Stedman Doubles (revised version)
  - Fantasia on a Ground and 2 Pavans (after Purcell)
  - Epistrophe for two pianos
  - L’homme armé
- John Tavener – The Whale (cantata)
- William Walton – Capriccio burlesco

=== Opera ===
- Richard Rodney Bennett – All the King's Men, children's opera
- Benjamin Britten – The Prodigal Son
- Robin Orr – Full Circle (STV for Scottish Opera)

== Film and incidental music ==
- John Barry – The Lion in Winter, starring Peter O'Toole and Katharine Hepburn.
- James Bernard – The Devil Rides Out, starring Christopher Lee.
- Paul Ferris – Witchfinder General directed by Michael Reeves, starring Vincent Price.
- Ron Goodwin – Where Eagles Dare, starring Richard Burton, Clint Eastwood and Mary Ure.

== Musical theatre ==
- Canterbury Tales, by Nevill Coghill & Martin Starkie

== Musical films ==
- Les Bicyclettes de Belsize
- Oliver!, starring Mark Lester, Ron Moody and Jack Wild
- Yellow Submarine (animation)

== Births ==
- 4 March – Patsy Kensit, actress and singer
- 23 March – Damon Albarn, singer and songwriter (Blur)
- 24 April – Roxanna Panufnik, British composer of Polish heritage
- 28 April – Howard Donald, singer and dancer (Take That)
- 11 May – Richie Wermerling, singer and keyboardist (Let Loose)
- 19 May – Paul Hartnoll, songwriter and musician (Orbital)
- May – Erran Baron Cohen, musician, founder of world music group Zohar
- 28 May – Kylie Minogue, actress and singer
- 13 June – Denise Pearson, singer (Five Star)
- 21 June – Sonique, singer and DJ
- 17 July – Darren Day, singer, actor and TV presenter
- 20 July – Kenneth Hesketh, composer
- 22 July – Rhys Ifans, actor and former vocalist with Super Furry Animals
- 31 July – Jomo Baxter, singer (Ultimate Kaos)
- 12 August – Paul Tucker, musician (Lighthouse Family)
- 21 August – Dina Carroll, singer
- 23 August – Benjamin Boyce, singer (Caught in the Act)
- 29 September – Matt and Luke Goss, singer and drummer (Bros)
- 7 October – Thom Yorke, musician (Radiohead)
- 10 November – Steve Brookstein, singer
- 21 November – Alex James, bassist (Blur)
- 25 November – Tunde Baiyewu, singer (Lighthouse Family)
- 29 November – Martin Carr (Boo Radleys)
- 17 December – Joe Cutler, composer, head of composition Royal Birmingham Conservatoire
- date unknown
  - Adrian Bawtree, composer and organist, director of music at Rochester Cathedral.
  - James Clapperton, Scottish composer and pianist
  - Alwynne Pritchard, composer, music theatre performer, artist and curator

== Deaths ==
- 23 January – Teresa del Riego, violinist, pianist, singer and composer of Spanish ancestry, 91
- 21 April – Norman Demuth, composer, 69
- 27 July – Lilian Harvey, actress and singer, 62
- 31 August – Sir Percy Hull, organist and composer, 89
- 6 September – Karl Rankl, Austrian-born conductor and composer, 69
- 16 September – Michael Carr, composer, 63
- 15 October – Franz Reizenstein, German-born composer and pianist, 57
- 20 October – Bud Flanagan, music hall star, 72
- 9 December – Percy Greenbank, lyricist, 90
- "Unknown" – Billy Pigg, bagpiper, 66

== See also ==
- 1968 in British radio
- 1968 in British television
- 1968 in the United Kingdom
- List of British films of 1968
