= Jazz 625 =

British television series

- Created by: Terry Henebery
- Presented by: Steve Race, Humphrey Lyttelton, Peter Clayton
- Theme music composer: Steve Race
- Country of origin: United Kingdom

Production
- Executive producers: Terry Henebery (17 episodes); Yvonne Littlewood (2 episodes)
- Producer: BBC

Original release
- Network: BBC2
- Release: 21 April 1964 – 17 August 1966

Jazz 625 was a BBC jazz programme featuring performances by British and American musicians, first broadcast between April 1964 and August 1966. It was created by Terry Henebery, a clarinetist recruited in 1963 as one of the new producers for BBC Two.

== Background ==
The title of the show referred to the fact that BBC2 was broadcast on 625-lines UHF rather than the 405-lines VHF system then used by the other channels. Other programme series included Theatre 625 and Cinema 625. The theme tune for the show was written by presenter Steve Race. Later presenters included Humphrey Lyttelton and Peter Clayton.

The programme began at the end of the dispute between the UK Musician's Union and the American Federation of Musicians. This meant that well known musicians from the United States could come to Britain for the first time since the 1930s. It also coincided with a fertile time for British jazz, with such musicians as Tubby Hayes, Tony Coe and John Dankworth becoming known internationally.

Bill Cotton, then Assistant Head of Light Entertainment Group (Variety) at the BBC, commissioned the first series. Henebery's initial format idea, however, a programme with interviews and profiles, was denied because of budget constraints. The BBC were keen "to turn it around and get something on the screen quickly."

Henebery, a clarinettist by training, had joined the BBC Television Service in 1955 as a sound operator, after several years serving in the Grenadier Guards, interspersed with study at the Royal Academy of Music. In 1958 he had moved to radio light entertainment at Aeolian Hall as a producer. He had a growing love of jazz, initiated by his friend saxophonist Ronnie Ross and spent four and a half years with Jimmy Grant producing Jazz Club. He returned to television in 1963.

== History ==
The first jazz show was a gala presentation of Duke Ellington entitled Ellington in Concert, recorded at the BBC Television Theatre and hosted by Steve Race, the presenter of many of the early programmes. The first part was broadcast on BBC2 on 21 April 1964. The day had been planned as the channel's second night, but after a fire at Battersea Power Station had blacked out all power at BBC Television Centre, it turned out to be the channel's opening night. The second part was aired five days later on 26 April

The second full show was a jam session featuring George Chisholm, Kenny Baker, Tony Coe, Roy Willox, Laurie Holloway, Jack Fallon and Lennie Hastings. A week later the show featured the Tubby Hayes Quintet with singer Betty Bennett. Later Henebery secured such internationally renowned musicians as Oscar Peterson, Dave Brubeck and the MJQ with Laurindo Almeida. Peterson was booked to play, for an hour, for a fee of £1,000 (equivalent to £20,000 in 2025), at a time when the total budget for the show was £800. Woody Herman later played with his band after having been seen at the Portsmouth Guildhall.

Some outside broadcasts were recorded at the Marquee Club and some from the original CTS studio in Bayswater, and included artists such as Art Blakey, Jimmy Giuffre and Erroll Garner. Other concerts were recorded at LAMDA. When not on the road the show was resident at the BBC Television Theatre, the Shepherd's Bush Empire. Unlike most shows of this era, the majority of Jazz 625 episodes have survived, with shows telerecorded onto 35mm film.

Henebery went on to produce further jazz series for the BBC, such as the 1968 Jazz at the Maltings which was recorded at Snape Maltings, in Suffolk and which opened with a concert by Buddy Rich and his band. After producing Jazz Scene for BBC2, Henebery accepted an offer from London Weekend Television, and embarked upon a long and successful freelance career which took him to Thames Television, the BBC again and finally to Yorkshire Television.

== Re-broadcasts ==
Some of the original programme material has been re-broadcast by the BBC. A run of selected programmes was aired on BBC2 in the early 1990s. In March 2009 BBC Four showed the 30-minute programme episode from 1964 featuring the quartet of pianist Dave Brubeck, introduced by Slim Gaillard, with footage restored and re-edited. Numbers included saxophonist Paul Desmond's "Take Five", the first jazz record to sell over one million copies.

In November 2010 BBC Four showed a one-hour compilation, titled BBC Four Compilation, with presenter Steve Race, featuring John Dankworth and Cleo Laine, Victor Feldman with Ronnie Scott, the Tubby Hayes Big Band, the Johnny Smith Quintet, Annie Ross with the Tony Kinsey Quintet and Bill Le Sage's Directions in Jazz. Another presenter-less one-hour compilation episode, titled Jazz 625 at the BBC, was broadcast in May 2014, featuring Duke Ellington, Chris Barber's Jazzband (ft. Ottilie Patterson), the Dave Brubeck Quartet, Wes Montgomery, Marian McPartland, the Woody Herman Orchestra, the Art Farmer Quartet, the Oscar Peterson Trio, Alton Purnell & Keith Smith Climax Band, Willie "The Lion" Smith, the Cannonball Adderley Quintet, Beryl Bryden & Acker Bilk's Paramount Jazz Band, and Dizzy Gillespie.

Other episodes re-broadcast by BBC Four have included Art Blakey and the Jazz Messengers, the Thelonious Monk Quartet, the Modern Jazz Quartet, the Dizzy Gillespie Quintet and Oscar Peterson.

Episodes have also been released on VHS and DVD.

== Jazz 625 on BBC Four ==
In May 2019, Jazz 625 returned to the BBC as a 90-minute live show on BBC Four called Jazz 625 Live: For One Night Only. This show was shot in black and white, and mixed archive clips with new performances from the Cheltenham Jazz Festival. Artists who appeared included Cleo Laine, Gregory Porter and Charlie Watts.

In November 2020, BBC Four broadcast another one-off special called Jazz 625: The British Jazz Explosion featuring new artists from the London Jazz scene and presented by Moses Boyd and Jamz Supernova.
