= The Window Cleaner (film) =

1968 British film by Malcolm Leigh

- Directed by: Malcolm Leigh
- Starring: Donald Sumpter; Edina Ronay; Ann Lancaster
- Distributed by: Border Films
- Release date: 1968
- Running time: 35 minutes
- Country: United Kingdom
- Language: English

The Window Cleaner is a 1968 British sex comedy short film directed and written by Malcolm Leigh and starring Donald Sumpter, Edina Ronay, and Ann Lancaster.

== Plot ==
David is a window cleaner employed on skyscrapers until he loses his nerve and is relegated to bungalows. Having asked to go back to high buildings, he once again loses his nerve and half-way up a block of flats meets Sharon, whose window he is cleaning. Sharon pulls him into her flat and seduces him. He finds the experience therapeutic.

== Cast ==
- Donald Sumpter as David
- Edina Ronay as Sharon
- Ann Lancaster as mother
- Jennifer Hill as secretary
- Peggy Aitchison as landlady
- Fred Griffiths as foreman
- Robert Hamilton as workman

== Reception ==
The Monthly Film Bulletin wrote: "An amorally moral tale of the therapeutic value of sex. The question of whether the young window cleaner's fears are resolved by the experience is left hanging in the air (as it were) since his possessive mother is still lurking in the background. But it hardly matters, since the film is not in the least convincing, though quite competently directed apart from an excess of distorted images to convey the young man's nightmares of falling from his cradle (his window cleaner's cradle, that is)."
