= 1968 in the United Kingdom =

Events from the year 1968 in the United Kingdom.

== Incumbents ==
- Monarch – Elizabeth II
- Prime Minister – Harold Wilson (Labour)

== Events ==
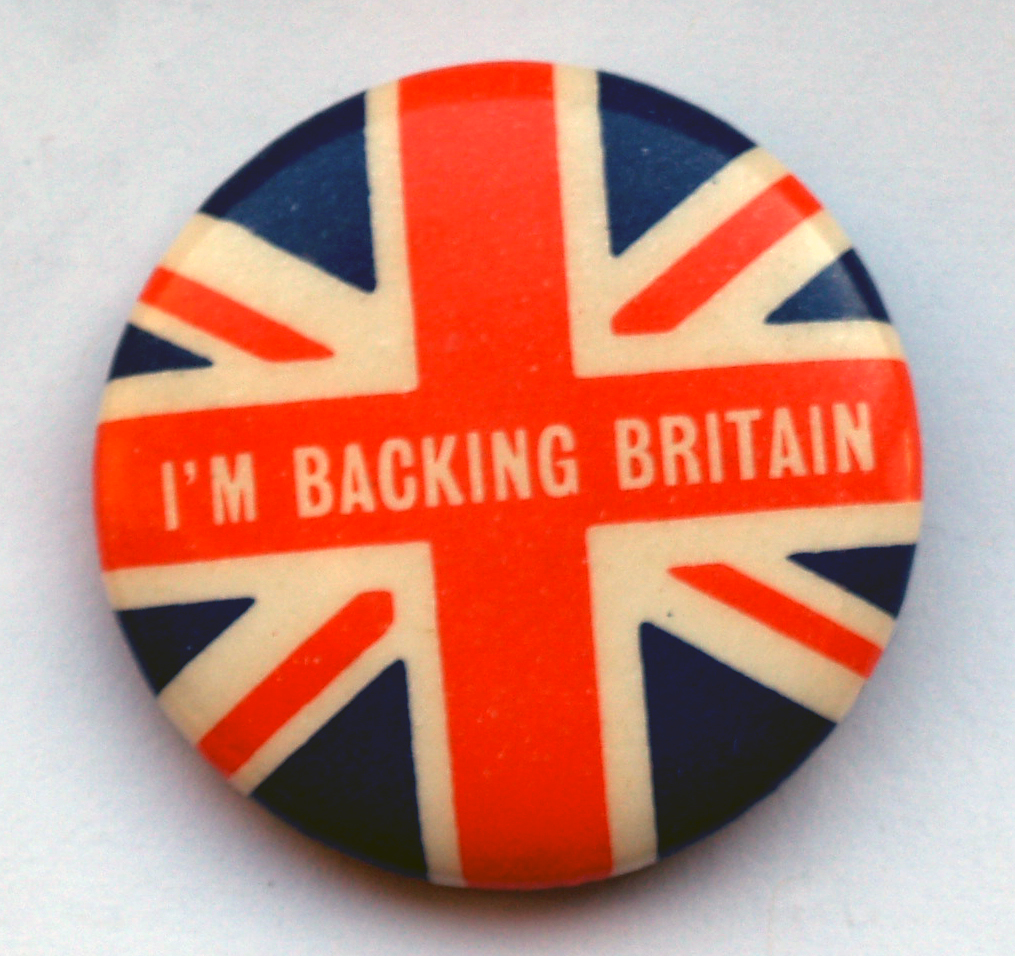

=== January ===
- January – The Ford Escort car is introduced to replace the Anglia.
- 1 January – Cecil Day-Lewis is announced as the new Poet Laureate, in succession to John Masefield.
- 5 January – Gardeners' World debuts on BBC1 television, featuring Percy Thrower.
- 8 January – Prime Minister Harold Wilson endorses the 'I'm Backing Britain' campaign, encouraging workers to work extra time without pay or take other actions to help competitiveness, which is spreading across the United Kingdom.
- 11 January–4 February – Hull triple trawler tragedy: three fishing trawlers from the port of Hull sink in separate incidents, killing 58 crew with just one survivor and leading to major changes to safety practice in the industry.
- 16 January – Prime Minister Wilson announces that the Civil Defence Corps is being stood down.

=== February ===
- 4 February – 96 Indians and Pakistanis arrive in the United Kingdom from Kenya. Some 1,500 Asians have now arrived in the UK from Kenya, where they have been forced out by increasingly draconian immigration laws.
- 6–18 February – Great Britain and Northern Ireland compete at the Winter Olympics in Grenoble, France, but do not win any medals.
- 14 February
  - Northampton, the county town of Northamptonshire, is designated as a new town, with the Labour Government hoping to double its size and population by 1980.
  - Constitutional law case of Padfield v Minister of Agriculture is decided in the House of Lords, determining that a minister's discretion to refuse an investigation is subject to judicial review where a refusal would frustrate the policy of an Act.
- 15 February – The Royal Navy makes the first test firing of a Polaris nuclear ballistic missile, from the submarine HMS Resolution.
- 24 February – Announcement of the first discovery (last year) of a pulsar by astronomer Jocelyn Bell Burnell working with Antony Hewish at the University of Cambridge.
- 26 February – Shelton Hospital fire: a fire at Shelton Mental Hospital, Shrewsbury, kills 21 patients.

=== March ===
- 1 March
  - Commonwealth Immigrants Act 1968 further reduces right of entry for citizens from the British Commonwealth to the UK.
  - First performance of an Andrew Lloyd Webber–Tim Rice musical, Joseph and the Amazing Technicolor Dreamcoat in its original form as a "pop cantata", by pupils of Colet Court preparatory school in Hammersmith.
- 2 March – Coal mining in the Black Country, which played a big part in the Industrial Revolution, ends after some 300 years with the closure of Baggeridge Colliery near Sedgley.
- 12 March – The island of Mauritius achieves independence from the UK.
- 14 March – The London Gold Pool will be closed from tomorrow as agreed late this evening by the U.K. government at the request of the United States and to stem the losses being suffered by the pound sterling.
- 15 March – In the early hours, the Prime Minister convenes a meeting of the privy council to declare today a non-statutory bank holiday, allowing the government to help stabilise the financial markets. George Brown, the Foreign Secretary, apparently drunk, is absent from meetings to discuss the crisis and is forced to resign from the government.
- 17 March – A demonstration in London's Grosvenor Square against U.S. involvement in the Vietnam War leads to violence – 91 police injured, 200 demonstrators arrested.
- 28 March – The Conservatives gain three seats from Labour in by-elections at Acton, Dudley and Meriden. The Acton by-election sees the first electoral appearance of the far-right National Front.

=== April ===
- 1 April – Thames Valley Police is formed by the amalgamation of Berkshire Constabulary, Buckinghamshire Constabulary, Oxford City Police, Oxfordshire Constabulary and Reading Borough Police.
- 6 April – The 13th Eurovision Song Contest is held in the Royal Albert Hall, London. The winning song, Spain's "La, la, la" is performed in Spanish by Massiel after Spanish authorities forbid Joan Manuel Serrat from performing it in Catalan. The UK finish in second place, just one point behind, with the song "Congratulations" sung by Cliff Richard, which goes on to outsell the winning Spanish entry throughout Europe.
- 7 April – Motor racing world champion Jim Clark, 32, is killed when his car leaves the track at 170 mph and smashes into a tree during a Formula 2 race at Hockenheim.
- 11 April – Popularity of Harold Wilson's Labour government is shown to be declining as opinion polls show the Conservatives, led by Edward Heath, with a lead of more than 20 points.
- 18 April – London Bridge sold to American entrepreneur Robert P. McCulloch, for £1,029,000, who rebuilds it at Lake Havasu City, Arizona.
- 20 April – Enoch Powell makes his controversial Rivers of Blood Speech on immigration, in Birmingham.
- 21 April – Enoch Powell is dismissed from the Shadow cabinet by Opposition leader Edward Heath due to the Rivers of Blood Speech, despite several opinion polls stating that the majority of the public shares Mr Powell's fears.
- 23 April – Five and ten pence coins are introduced in the run-up to Decimalisation, which will be complete within the next three years.
- 27 April – The Abortion Act 1967 comes into effect, legalising abortion on a number of grounds, with free provision through the National Health Service.

=== May ===
- 1 May – RAF Strike Command is created within the Royal Air Force by consolidation of RAF Bomber Command and RAF Fighter Command.
- 3 May – Mr. Frederick West (aged 45) becomes the United Kingdom's first heart transplant patient, in London.
- 8 May
  - The Kray Twins, 34-year-old Ronnie and Reggie, are among 18 men arrested in dawn raids across London. They stand accused of a series of crimes including murder, fraud, blackmail and assault. Their 41-year-old brother Charlie Kray is one of the other 16 men under arrest.
  - A possible coup against Harold Wilson is suggested in a meeting arranged by newspaper publisher Cecil Harmsworth King with Lord Mountbatten: King enquires whether Mountbatten would take over government in the event of civil disorder but is rebuffed.
- 11 May – Manchester City win the Football League First Division title.
- 16 May – Ronan Point tower block in the east London Borough of Newham collapses after a gas explosion, killing four occupants.
- 18 May – West Bromwich Albion win the FA Cup for the fifth time, with Jeff Astle scoring the only goal of the game against Everton at the Wembley Stadium.
- 22 May – The General Assembly of the Church of Scotland permits the ordination of women as ministers.
- 29 May – Manchester United become the first English winners of the European Cup after beating Benfica 4–1 in extra time at Wembley Stadium.
- May – The National Liberal Party is wholly assimilated into the Conservative Party.

=== June ===
- 7 June – Start of Ford sewing machinists strike at the Dagenham assembly plant: women workers strike to have their work valued as 'skilled' (Grade C) rather than 'unskilled' (Grade B). The machinists feel that they are skilled as they have had to pass a test to gain employment making car seats. They do not achieve full wage parity but are given 92% of the men's rate rather than 85%. This influences the Equal Pay Act 1970.
- 8 June – James Earl Ray, who was responsible for the assassination of Martin Luther King Jr. in the United States on 4 April and has been living in London for a month, is arrested at Heathrow Airport when he attempts to depart on a flight bound for Brussels en route to seek a mercenary position in Africa.
- 10 June – The National Health Service reintroduces prescription charges.
- 18 June – The United Kingdom's first heart transplant patient, Frederick West, dies 46 days after his operation.
- 20 June – Austin Currie, Member of Parliament at Stormont in Northern Ireland, along with others, squats a house in Caledon to protest against discrimination in housing allocations.
- 29 June – The Keighley & Worth Valley Railway runs its "Re-Opening Special", the first public service since the line's closure in 1961 on what becomes a popular heritage railway.

=== July ===
- July – Cotton trading at the Royal Exchange, Manchester, ceases.
- 1–2 July – July 1968 England and Wales dust fall storms.
- 4 July – Alec Rose returns to Southsea from a 354-day single-handed round-the-world trip for which he receives a knighthood the following day.
- 10 July – Floods in South West England.
- 17 July – The Beatles animated film Yellow Submarine is premiered in London.
- 26 July – Theft Act 1968 (coming into effect 1 January 1969 in England and Wales) passed, simplifying offences relating to property crime and abolishing the offence of larceny.
- 30 July – Thames Television starts transmission in London.
- 31 July – BBC television sitcom Dad's Army is broadcast for the first time in the UK.

=== August ===
- 8 August – Royal Navy Leander-class frigate HMS Scylla is launched at Devonport, the last ship to be built in a Royal Dockyard.
- 11 August – British Rail's last steam train service runs on the standard gauge: steam locomotives make the 314-mile (505 km) return passenger journey from Liverpool to Carlisle before being dispatched to the scrapyard or preservation.
- 31 August – First Isle of Wight Festival is held.

=== September ===
- September
  - The new school year in England sees the first local authorities adopt three tier education, where 5–7 infant, 7–11 junior schools are replaced by 5–8 or 5–9 first schools and 8–12 or 9–13 middle schools, with the transfer age to grammar and secondary modern schools being increased to 12 or 13.
  - Japanese carmaker Nissan launches its Datsun badged range of cars onto the British market.
- 8 September – English tennis player Virginia Wade wins the 1968 U.S. Open Women's Singles event.
- 13 September – An agreement for merger between the General Electric Company and English Electric, the largest industrial merger in the UK up to that time.
- 15 September – Great Flood of 1968 in South East England.
- 16 September – General Post Office divides post into first-class and second-class services.
- 26 September – Theatres Act 1968 (royal assent 26 July) ends censorship of the theatre.
- 27 September – US musical Hair opens in London following the removal of theatre censorship.

=== October ===
- October – The M1 motorway is completed when the final 35-mile section opens between Rotherham and Leeds.
- 2 October
  - A woman from Birmingham gives birth to the first recorded instance of live sextuplets in the UK; 5 survive.
  - The Sound of Music soundtrack album exceeds 2 million sales in the UK, meaning that one in four homes with a record player has the recording.
- 5 October – A civil rights march in Derry, Northern Ireland, which includes several Stormont and British MPs, is batoned off the streets by the Royal Ulster Constabulary.
- 6 October – British racing drivers Jackie Stewart, Graham Hill and John Surtees take the first three places at the United States Grand Prix.
- 8 October – Enoch Powell warns that immigrants "may change the character" of England.
- 12–27 October – Great Britain and Northern Ireland compete at the Olympics in Mexico City and win 5 gold, 5 silver and 3 bronze medals.
- 13 October – The rebuilt Euston railway station opens.
- 18 October – National Giro opens for business through the General Post Office, with administrative headquarters at Bootle.
- 27 October – Police and protestors clash at an anti-Vietnam War protest outside the Embassy of the United States in London.
- 31 October – Alan Bennett's play Forty Years On premieres at the Apollo Theatre in the West End.

=== November ===
- 18 November – James Watt Street fire: a warehouse fire in Glasgow kills 22 people.
- 21 November – The Cyril Lord carpet business goes into receivership.
- 22 November – The Beatles ("The White Album") and The Kinks Are the Village Green Preservation Society are released.
- 26 November – The Race Relations Act is passed, making it illegal to refuse housing, employment or public services to people in England, Wales and Scotland because of their ethnic background.
- 29 November – Dawley New Town (Designation) Amendment (Telford) Order extends the boundaries of Dawley New Town in Shropshire and renames it Telford.
- 30 November – The Trade Descriptions Act comes into force, preventing shops and traders from describing goods in a misleading way.

=== December ===
- 11 December – The Rolling Stones Rock and Roll Circus is filmed (but is not released until 1996).
- 17 December
  - Mary Bell, an eleven-year-old girl from Newcastle upon Tyne, is sentenced to life detention for the manslaughter of two small boys.
  - Official opening of first phase of the Royal Mint's new Llantrisant plant in South Wales.
- Late December – Cases of Hong Kong flu, sporadic since summer in the UK, begin to rise. Over the coming year the pandemic will kill approximately 80,000.

=== Full date unknown ===
- BackCare medical research charity is founded.

== Publications ==
- Agatha Christie's novel By the Pricking of My Thumbs.
- Arthur C. Clarke's novel 2001: A Space Odyssey.
- Lawrence Durrell's novel Tunc, first of The Revolt of Aphrodite pair.
- Paul Scott's novel The Day of the Scorpion, second of the Raj Quartet.
- John Wyndham's novel Chocky.

== Births ==
=== January – March ===
- 8 January – James Brokenshire, British Conservative politician, Secretary of State for Northern Ireland (died 2021)
- 12 January – Heather Mills, British model, businesswoman and campaigner
- 16 January – Atticus Ross, English musician, songwriter, record producer and audio engineer
- 27 January
  - Matthew d'Ancona, British journalist, editor of The Spectator
  - Tricky (born Adrian Thaws), English rapper and musician
- 5 February – Lee Martin, footballer
- 16 February – Warren Ellis, British comic-book and graphic-novel writer
- 2 March – Daniel Craig, British actor
- 3 March – Brian Cox, English particle physicist, science communicator and rock keyboardist
- 4 March
  - Patsy Kensit, English actress
  - Christina McKelvie, Scottish politician and social worker (died 2025)
- 5 March – Theresa Villiers, British Conservative politician and MP for Chipping Barnet
- 9 March – Maggie Aderin-Pocock, British scientist and science educator
- 13 March – Gillian Keegan, Conservative politician
- 16 March – David MacMillan, Scottish-born organic chemist, recipient of the Nobel Prize in Chemistry
- 18 March – Paul Marsden, British Labour/Liberal Democrat politician
- 20 March – Paul Merson, English footballer
- 21 March
  - Jaye Davidson, British actor
  - Gary Walsh, English footballer
- 23 March
  - Damon Albarn, English musician (Blur and Gorillaz)
  - Mike Atherton, English cricketer
- 26 March – Chris Ward, British chess grandmaster, coach and author
- 28 March – Nasser Hussain, English cricketer

=== April – June ===
- 5 April – Stewart Lee, comedian
- 8 April – Jenny Powell, British television presenter
- 18 April – David Hewlett, British-born Canadian actor, writer and director
- 22 April – Amanda Mealing, British actress
- 23 April – Ricky Groves, English actor
- 28 April – Howard Donald, singer
- 4 May – Julian Barratt, English comedian and actor
- 8 May – Rachel Jordan, British artist
- 9 May – Ruth Kelly, British Labour politician, Secretary of State for Communities and Local Government 2006–7 and MP for Bolton West 1997–2010
- 10 May – William Regal, professional wrestler
- 12 May – Catherine Tate, comedian
- 14 May – Greg Davies, comedian
- 16 May – Stephen Mangan, actor
- 17 May – Levi Bellfield, né Rabbetts, serial killer
- 27 May
  - Rebekah Brooks, journalist, editor of The Sun
  - Ekow Eshun, arts journalist and administrator
- 29 May
  - Torquhil Ian Campbell, 13th Duke of Argyll, Scottish peer
  - Jessica Morden, British Labour politician and MP for Newport East
- 2 June
  - Jon Culshaw, English comedian and impressionist
  - Mike Dean, football referee
- 4 June – Ian Taylor, footballer
- 5 June
  - Mel Giedroyc, actress and comedian
  - Edward Vaizey, British Conservative politician and MP for Wantage
- 7 June – Sarah Parish, English actress
- 13 June
  - David Gray, British folk rock singer-songwriter
  - Marcel Theroux, British novelist and broadcaster, son of American writer Paul Theroux
- 15 June – Samira Ahmed, journalist and broadcaster
- 26 June – Iwan Roberts, Welsh footballer
- 28 June – Adam Woodyatt, British actor

=== July – September ===
- 5 July – Moazzam Begg, British Islamist held in extrajudicial detention in the US Guantanamo Bay detainment camp
- 20 July – Julian Rhind-Tutt, English film, television and radio actor
- 21 July – Gary O'Donnell, Scottish soldier (died 2008)
- 22 July – Rhys Ifans, Welsh actor
- 26 July – Olivia Williams, English actress
- 27 July – Carl Sargeant, Welsh politician (suicide 2017)
- 4 August – Lee Mack, English comedian
- 5 August – Colin McRae, Scottish rally driver (died 2007)
- 8 August – Julian Dicks, English footballer
- 14 August
  - Darren Clarke, Northern Irish golfer
  - Jane Couch, boxer
  - Adrian Lester, British actor
- 15 August – Kate Osamor, Labour Party politician
- 17 August – Helen McCrory, English actress (died 2021)
- 22 August – Elisabeth Murdoch, Australian-born business executive
- 26 August – Chris Boardman, English racing cyclist
- September – Angela Hartnett, chef
- 3 September – Achilleas Kallakis, fraudster
- 9 September
  - Anas Altikriti, British anti-war activist
  - Julia Sawalha, English actress
- 14 September – Grant Shapps, British Conservative politician and MP for Welwyn Hatfield
- 20 September – Philippa Forrester, British television presenter
- 28 September – Naomi Watts, English-born actress
- 29 September – Luke and Matt Goss, twin brother singers, members of Bros

=== October – December ===
- 1 October – Mark Durden-Smith, British television presenter
- 2 October – Victoria Derbyshire, British broadcast presenter
- 3 October – Paul Crichton, English footballer
- 4 October – Beverley Allitt, British serial killer of children
- 7 October – Thom Yorke, British singer/songwriter
- 10 October – Chris Ofili, English painter
- 14 October
  - Matthew Le Tissier, English footballer
  - Roger Moorhouse, British historian and author
- 18 October – Rhod Gilbert, Welsh comedian and broadcaster
- 27 October – Martin Clark, English snooker player
- 10 November – Steve Brookstein, British singer
- 18 November – Barry Hunter, Northern Irish footballer and football manager
- 22 November – Andrew Gilligan, British journalist
- 23 November – Kirsty Young, Scottish radio and television presenter
- 9 December – Sharon Graham, British trade unionist
- 18 December – James Miller, Welsh film-maker (killed 2003)
- 20 December – Phil Andrews, British race car driver
- 23 December – Siôn Simon, British Labour politician and MP for Birmingham Erdington
- 28 December – Pauline Robertson, Scottish field hockey player

=== Unknown dates ===
- Sonita Alleyne, Barbados-born media production company executive and college principal
- Julian Baggini, philosopher
- Andrew O'Hagan, Scottish writer and novelist

== Deaths ==
=== January – March ===
- 27 January – Maxwell Knight, spymaster and naturalist (born 1900)
- 6 February – Gomer Berry, 1st Viscount Kemsley, Welsh journalist (born 1883)
- 17 February – Sir Donald Wolfit, actor-manager (born 1902)
- 20 February – Anthony Asquith, director and writer (born 1902)

=== April – June ===
- 7 April – Jim Clark, Scottish race car driver, racetrack accident in Germany (born 1936)
- 19 April – Ronald Urquhart, general (born 1906)
- 3 May – Ness Edwards, Welsh politician (born 1897)
- 7 May – Mike Spence, English race car driver, racetrack accident (born 1936)
- 11 May – Frederick Bellenger, English politician, Secretary of State for War (born 1894)
- 29 May – Sir Stewart Menzies, chief of the British Secret Intelligence Service (born 1890)
- 21 June – Captain W. E. Johns, aviator and writer, creator of Biggles (born 1893)
- 24 June – Tony Hancock, English comedian, suicide in Australia (born 1924)

=== July – September ===
- 9 July – Sir Alexander Cadogan, diplomat (born 1884)
- 13 July – R. J. Yeatman, humorist (born 1897)
- 16 July – William Evans, Welsh-language poet (born 1883)
- 23 July – Henry Hallett Dale, English scientist, recipient of the Nobel Prize in Physiology or Medicine (born 1875)
- 19 August – George Gamow, Ukrainian-born physicist (born 1904)
- 27 August – Princess Marina, Duchess of Kent (born 1906)
- 11 September – Tommy Armour, Scottish golfer (born 1894)
- 16 September – George Cholmondeley, 5th Marquess of Cholmondeley, Lord Great Chamberlain (born 1883)
- 29 September – Paul Radmilovic, Welsh-born competitive swimmer, 4-times Olympic gold medal winner (born 1886)

=== October – December ===
- 13 October – Stanley Unwin, publisher (born 1884)
- 20 October – Bud Flanagan, comedian and singer (born 1896)
- 17 November – Mervyn Peake, writer and illustrator (born 1911)
- 28 November – Enid Blyton, children's writer (born 1897)
- 14 December – David James Jones (Gwenallt), Welsh-language poet (born 1899)

== See also ==
- 1968 in British music
- 1968 in British television
- List of British films of 1968
