= Ann Lancaster =

English actress (1920–1970)

- Lancaster in The Magic Box (1951)
- Born: 5 May 1920; London, England
- Died: 31 October 1970 (aged 50); Paddington, London, England
- Occupation: Actress

Ann Lancaster (5 May 1920 – 31 October 1970) was a well-known character actress who appeared in many British films, television shows and in theatre.

Lancaster specialised in comic roles and had a talent for voices which she often used on radio to portray children and to do voiceovers for television commercials. Her most high-profile film roles were in The Million Pound Note (1953), A Night to Remember (1958, uncredited as a woman on a train), The Dirty Dozen (1967), Fathom (1967), The Railway Children (1970), and in one Carry On Film Carry On Again Doctor (1969). She was the principal performer in the Ajax 'It cleans like a white tornado' advertisements on television. She was in the radio show: Mrs Dale's Diary, and appeared in many well-known television comedies including Hancock's Half Hour, Till Death Us Do Part, Tea at the Ritz, Hughie and The World of Beachcomber with Spike Milligan.

== Personal life ==
Ann Lancaster was born in 1920 in London and died of cancer in 1970 in Paddington, London at the age of 50, before her last film (The Railway Children) was released.

== Filmography ==
- Cage of Gold (1950) .... Minor Role (uncredited)
- The Magic Box (1951) .... Bridesmaid in wedding group
- Judgment Deferred (1952) .... girl in shop. (uncredited)
- The Secret People (1952) .... Manicurist a.k.a. Secret People
- The Card (1952) .... Miriam (uncredited)
- Angels One Five (1952) .... W.A.A.F.
- The Million Pound Note (1953) .... Doris (uncredited)
- A Night to Remember (1958) .... Mrs. Bull – Woman on Train (uncredited)
- The Flesh and the Fiends (1960) .... Minuet Dancer (uncredited)
- The Durant Affair (1962)
- The Lamp in Assassin Mews (1962) .... Mrs. Dowling
- I've Gotta Horse (1965) .... Woman Shopkeeper a.k.a. Wonderful Day
- The Secret of My Success (1965) .... Angela Pringle
- Bunny Lake Is Missing (1965) .... Grocer's Assistant
- Three Bites of the Apple (1967) .... Winnifred Batterfly
- The Dirty Dozen (1967) .... chief prostitute (uncredited)
- Fathom (1967) .... Mrs. Trivers
- The Window Cleaner (1968) .... Mother
- Inadmissible Evidence (1968) .... Drinking Club Hostess
- Hot Millions (1968) .... Pendleton's Landlady (uncredited)
- Decline and Fall... of a Birdwatcher (1968) .... Mrs. Grimes
- Till Death Us Do Part (1968) .... Woman at Block of Flats
- Journey to Midnight (1968) .... Red Queen (episode 'Poor Butterfly')
- A Nice Girl Like Me (1969) .... Miss Garland
- Carry On Again Doctor (1969) .... Miss Armitage
- Rhubarb (1969) .... Mrs. Rhubarb
- The Railway Children (1970) .... Ruth

== TV ==
- The Vise (1 episode, 1959) .... Fat Lady

... a.k.a. Detective's Diary (USA: rerun title)
... a.k.a. Saber of London (UK)
... a.k.a. The Vise: Mark Saber (USA: third and fourth season title)
... a.k.a. Uncovered (syndication title)

- It's Only Mink (1959) TV Episode .... Fat Lady
- Hancock's Half Hour (3 episodes, 1957–1959) The Big Night (1959) TV Episode
- "The Russian Prince" (1957) TV Episode (as Anne Lancaster) .... Russian Aristocrat
- "Lady Chatterley's Revenge" (1957) TV Episode .... Cynthia – Actress
- "Tea at the Ritz" (1963) (TV) .... Rene Barnes ... a.k.a. Comedy Four: Tea at the Ritz (UK: series title)
- Comedy Playhouse ....(1 episode, 1963)
- "The Chars" (1963) TV Episode .... Amanda
- An Enemy of the State (1965) (mini) TV Series .... Grusha
- The Wednesday Play Up the Junction (1965) TV Episode .... Winnie
- Out of the Unknown ....(1 episode, 1965)
- "Come Buttercup, Come Daisy, Come...?" (1965) TV Episode .... Mrs. Bryant
- The Spies .... (1 episode, 1966) .... Dora
- No Strings (1967) (TV)
- Z-Cars .... (3 episodes, 1963–1967)
- "Family Affair: Part 2" (1967) TV Episode .... Annie Ramsbottom
- "Running Milligan" (1963) TV Episode .... Milly
- "Train of Events" (1963) TV Episode .... Geraldine
- Till Death Us Do Part (1 episode, 'Aunt Maud', 1968) .... Maud
- Please Sir! (2 episodes, 1968) .... Mrs. Pearce
- Best of Enemies (1 episode, 1968) .... Mrs. Ewing
- Thirty-Minute Theatre (1 episode, 1969)
- Someone's Knocking at Me Door (1969) TV Episode .... Mollie Thompson
- The World of Beachcomber (unknown episodes, 1969) TV Series .... Various
- Barry Humphries' Scandals (1 episode, 1970)
- Father, Dear Father .... Bookshop Customer (1 episode, 1970)
- "The Suitable Suitor" (1970) TV Episode .... Bookshop Customer
