= Nelly's Version =

- Directed by: Maurice Hatton
- Written by: Maurice Hatton
- Based on: Nelly's Version by Eva Figes
- Produced by: Penny Clark; Paul Sparrow
- Starring: Eileen Atkins; Anthony Bate; Barbara Jefford; Nicholas Ball; Brian Deacon
- Cinematography: Curtis Clark
- Edited by: Thomas Schwalm
- Music by: Michael Nyman
- Production companies: Mithras; Channel Four Films
- Distributed by: Channel Four
- Release date: June 1983
- Running time: 98 minutes
- Country: United Kingdom
- Language: English

Nelly's Version is a 1983 British mystery film directed by Maurice Hatton and starring Eileen Atkins, Anthony Bate and Nicholas Ball. It was based on a novel by Eva Figes. The screenplay concerns Nelly Dean, a woman who turns up a hotel having lost her memory and forgotten who she is.

== Cast ==
- Eileen Atkins as Nelly Dean
- Anthony Bate as George Wilkinson
- Barbara Jefford as Ms. Wyckham
- Nicholas Ball as Inspector Leach
- George A. Cooper as Douglas McKenzie
- Elena David as Ms. Monroe
- Brian Deacon as David Dean
- Andy de la Tour as Station Porter
- Ann Firbank as Patricia McKenzie
- Marsha Fitzalan as Susan Dean
- Hugh Fraser as Salesman
- Darcy Hare as Twin
- Lewis Hare as Twin
- William Hoyland as Bank Manager
- Miki Iveria as Mrs. Knatchbull
- Nizwar Karanj as Hotel Porter
- Stella Maris as Vagrant
- Susannah York as Narrator (voice)

== Reception ==
A Variety review called the film "art that droops with symbolism and lacks the narrative thrust to assure broad appeal, even in art house locations". The musical score was criticized, though the way the camerawork emphasized a character's sense of alienation was praised".
