= Praise Marx and Pass the Ammunition =

1968 British film by Maurice Hatton

- Directed by: Maurice Hatton
- Screenplay by: Maurice Hatton
- Based on: an idea by Michael Wood; Maurica Hatton
- Produced by: Maurice Hatton
- Starring: John Thaw; Edina Ronay; Louis Mahoney
- Cinematography: Charles Stewart
- Edited by: Eduardo Guedes
- Music by: Carl Davis
- Production company: Mithras Films Ltd.
- Release date: 19 December 1968
- Running time: 89 minutes
- Country: United Kingdom
- Language: English
- Budget: £25,000

Praise Marx and Pass the Ammunition is a 1968 British political comedy-drama film directed, written and produced by Maurice Hatton and starring John Thaw, Edina Ronay and Louis Mahoney. It concerns the adventures of a young British political activist.

== Plot ==
Dom is a 30-year-old Marxist–Leninist member of the Revolutionary Party of the Third World, a small group of political activists. He has a stream of girlfriends whom he lectures on political theory. After visiting Paris during the May 1968 demonstrations, on his return he urges his group that similar revolutionary tactics are urgently needed in England. He visits factories to talk to the workers and gets involved with a Liverpool company facing closure. At the same time, he is put on a mock trial by members of his own group, accused of betraying the revolutionary cause.

== Cast ==
- John Thaw as Dom
- Edina Ronay as Lucy
- Louis Mahoney as Julius
- Anthony Villaroel as Arthur
- Helen Fleming as Clara
- David David as Lal
- Roger Smith as narrator
- Tandy Cronyn as American girl
- Carl Davis as composer
- Bill Dean as Liverpool delegate
- Otto Diamant as Italian
- Freddie Earlle as Liverpool delegate
- Eva Enger as Swedish girl
- John Garvin as body
- Joe Grieg as Irishman
- Tom Kempinski as designer
- James Mellor as shop steward
- Artro Morris as union organiser
- Tina Packer as air hostess
- Dennis Alaba Peters as reporter
- Jenny Robbins as shop assistant
- Neville Smith as Liverpool delegate
- Tommy Summers as Liverpool delegate
- Tanya as Paraguayan girl

== Production ==
The film was made in four weeks on a budget of £25,000 sourced from the British Film Institute Production Fund, Hatton's own company Mithras Films, the National Film Finance Corporation and a German TV company.

== Release ==
It was released in the UK on 19 December 1969, and shown on Channel 4 TV on 19 April 1985.

== Critical reception ==
The Monthly Film Bulletin wrote:

In the context of the British cinema, Praise Marx and Pass the Ammunition is a considerable achievement. Maurice Hatton's first feature film, it was made on the extremely limited budget of £25,000, with a shooting schedule of only four weeks, using a full union crew. The film attempts to examine the dilemma of the extreme Left in Britain today, committed as it is to proletarian revolution .... John Thaw as Dom gives a suitably dry performance. Hatton's intention appears nevertheless to be to preach the revolutionary cause, using a commentary as his major device, and at the end we are told "The film ends here, but the struggle continues" as the train leaves for Liverpool and the possibility of a workers' take-over of the factory. In a series of crudely inserted documentary sequences consisting of a montage of stills on housing conditions, occupational diseases and educational opportunity, Hatton puts the case for radical social change ... At the same time, we are led to believe that Dom's encounter with the realities of the May revolution brings about a change in him so that his position within the party becomes untenable. At this level, however, the film is extremely muddled, largely because of the shortcomings of the script, which mixes commentary and dialogue in what appears to be too indiscriminate a fashion for any sustained argument to be deduced.

Kine Weekly wrote:

Producer, director and scriptwriter Maurice Hatton has made several documentaries, and his experience in the documentary field is apparent in this, his first feature. It has been made with considerable assurance especially when its very low budget is taken into account. Episodic in construction, it is a kind of odyssey of a revolutionary who, by coming face to face with various real-life and fictitious political situations, is forced to analyse objective principles and tactics and his own subjective feelings – as, for instance, when he suddenly finds he is expected to torture an unknown drugged informer. But only those who agree with the very specialized and narrow line of revolution argument which the film puts forward can have the patience to follow it through. It works best during its faintly comic, self-mocking passages, which invite broader interest and involvement.

The Radio Times Guide to Films gave the film 3/5 stars, writing: "Do not be deterred by this formidable-looking piece of political propaganda, made for virtually nothing and originally seen by virtually no one. Although it is part agitprop, with lots of facts and figures on social deprivation, it is, as the title suggests, mostly satire and takes amusing swipes at a Swinging Sixties stereotype, the Marxist-Leninist revolutionary with noble ideals and feet of clay. Partly shot during the Paris student riots, it is a fascinating testament to long-lost hopes."

The Listener wrote: "If this is a comedy of the far Left trying to get it together, it is made all the more effective by the inclusion of documentary material which acknowledges that the underlying problems are real enough. ...In a way, this is [Hatton's] own attempt to import the bracing atmosphere of Paris '68, with his mixed method (fiction and documentary, revolutionary comedy and direct address on the need for social change) owing something to the work of Jean-Luc Godard."

Time Out wrote: "Very much a product of the revolution in the air of 1968, Hatton's first feature has rather dated in its attempts to state a case for radical social change in Britain. More than a little muddled anyway when trying to be serious, it was always much better at digging satirically into areas of bad faith as its hero, a 30-year-old Marxist-Leninist of working class origins (sharply played by a pre-Sweeney Thaw), seduces a string of bourgeois beauties in the hope of also impregnating them with his revolutionary message. As in Long Shot (1978), Hatton's quirkish sense of humour is the thing."

In Sixties British Cinema, film historian Robert Murphy describes the film as "a wonderfully authentic evocation of late-60s radical politics."
