= Frost on Sunday =

Frost on Sunday may refer to:

- Frost on Sunday (1968–1970), one of a trio of talk shows for LWT that aired from August 1968 to March 1970
- David Frost on Sunday, a political programme that aired from September 1986 until December 1992.
- Breakfast with Frost, a political programme that aired from 1993 to 2005
