= BackCare =

British medical charity

BackCare (previously the National Back Pain Association and the Back Pain Research Association) is a British medical research charity organisation that provides services for the management of back problems.

== History ==
The organisation was established in 1968 as the Back Pain Research Association by businessman and philanthropist, Stanley Grundy, who suffered from chronic back pain following a sailing accident in 1967. At this time, information and research into the management and prevention of back pain was limited. One of the charity's initial aims was to focus on persuading medical professionals to adopt a multidisciplinary approach to the treatment of back pain. The charity also aimed to educate the general public in preventing and alleviating back pain through international seminars, publications, a helpline, support networks, and the charity's website.

== Awards and current services ==
BackCare provides information and education to prevent unnecessary back pain, as well as practical and emotional support, guidance and advice to people living with back pain due to gradual deterioration, injury, musculoskeletal disorders, such as scoliosis, spina bifida, arthritis and axial spondyloarthritis, or other serious underlying health conditions, such as multiple sclerosis, Parkinson's disease, or cancer.

BackCare released an iPhone app in 2010, which runs on all Apple devices. It was featured in The Sunday Times' Top 500 Apps on 20 February 2011, and won the Best Use of Technology Award at the Charity Times Awards 2011.
