= Edina Ronay =

Fashion designer and former actress (born 1943)

Edina Ronay FRSA
- Born: Edina Maria Ronay; 8 January 1943 (age 83); Budapest, Hungary
- Occupations: Fashion designer; actress
- Spouse: Dick Polak (m. 1971; died 2025)
- Children: 2, including Shebah
- Father: Egon Ronay

Edina Maria Ronay FRSA (born 8 January 1943) is an Anglo-Hungarian fashion designer and former actress. She is the daughter of food critic Egon Ronay and the mother of actress/writer Shebah Ronay.

In films and television from 1960, Ronay's numerous TV roles included The Avengers, No Hiding Place, Special Branch, The Champions, Randall and Hopkirk (Deceased) and Jason King.

She retired from acting in the mid-1970s to take up fashion design, specialising in knitwear; she eventually formed her own company in 1984. Ronay was honoured as a Fellow of the Royal Society of Arts.

== Filmography ==
- The Pure Hell of St Trinian's (1960) as Lavinia (uncredited)
- Edgar Wallace Mysteries Episode: Five to One (film) (1963) as Gloria
- A Hard Day's Night (1964) as Girl at Disco (uncredited)
- Night Train to Paris (1964) as Julie
- The Black Torment (1964) as Lucy Judd
- The Collector (1965) as Nurse / Next Victim (uncredited)
- A Study in Terror (1965) as Mary Jane Kelly
- He Who Rides a Tiger (1965) as Anna
- The Big Job (1965) as Sally Gamely
- Carry On Cowboy (1965) as Dolores
- Prehistoric Women (1967) as Saria
- Our Mother's House (1967) as Doreen
- The Window Cleaner (1968) as Sharon
- To Grab the Ring (1968) as Vriendin
- Praise Marx and Pass the Ammunition (1968) as Lucy
- Sherlock Holmes Episode: A Study in Scarlet (1968) as Alice Charpentier
- Three (1969) as Liz
- Poussez pas grand-père dans les cactus (1969) as Nathalie, Hostess
- The Swordsman (1974) as Guy Champion
