= The Root of All Evil? (1968 TV series) =

British TV anthology series (1968–1969)

The Root of All Evil? is a British television series which aired from 1968 to 1969. It was an anthology series with a monetary theme. It was produced by Yorkshire Television and aired on ITV. Unlike many ITV series of the 1960s, the programme survives intact.

== Episode list ==
Series 1:

- The Bonus (aired 1 October 1968)
- The Fireplace Firm (aired 8 October 1968)
- You Can Only Buy Once (aired 15 October 1968)
- The Last of the Big Spenders (aired 22 October 1968)
- Money for Change (aired 29 October 1968)
- Of Course We Trust You Arnold (aired 5 November 1968)
- West of Eden (aired 12 November 1968)
- The Right Attitude? (aired 19 November 1968)

Series 2:

- The Long Sixpence (aired 24 November 1969)
- A Bit of a Holiday (aired 1 December 1969)
- What's in It for Me? (aired 8 December 1969)
- Bloxham's Concerto for Critic and Carpenter (aired 15 December 1969)
- Floating Man (aired 22 December 1969)
