= James Clapperton =

Scottish composer and pianist

James Clapperton (born 1968 in Aberdeen) is a Scottish composer and pianist.
