= Maurice Hatton =

British screenwriter and film director (1938–1997)

Maurice Hatton (22 May 1938 – 25 October 1997) was a British screenwriter and film director.

After training as a photographer, Hatton became involved in making documentary films, as a founder of Mithras Films in 1962, moving into making feature films several years later.

Hatton was also on the BFI Production Board.

Hatton died in 1997 after a heart attack.

== Selected filmography ==
Director

- Praise Marx and Pass the Ammunition (1970)
- Long Shot (1978)
- Nelly's Version (1983)
- American Roulette (1988)
- Satan at His Best (1995)
