= 1924 in British radio =

This is a list of events from British radio in 1924.

== Events ==
=== January ===
- 1 January – The Meteorological Office issues its first broadcast Shipping Forecast, at this time called Weather Shipping.
- 15 January – The world's first original adult radio play, Danger by Richard Hughes, is broadcast by the British Broadcasting Company from its studios in London.

=== February ===
- 5 February – Hourly Greenwich Time Signal from Royal Greenwich Observatory is broadcast for the first time.
- 24 February – The first broadcasts from the British Broadcasting Company's 6FL Sheffield radio station listed in The Radio Times. (Note: It is probable that 6FL Sheffield broadcast prior to this date without being listed in The Radio Times.)

=== March ===
- 28 March – First broadcasts from the 5PY Plymouth radio station listed in The Radio Times. (Note: It is probable that 5PY Plymouth broadcast prior to this date without being listed in The Radio Times.)

=== April ===
- 23 April – First broadcast by King George V, opening the British Empire Exhibition at Wembley Stadium. It is recorded off-air by a listener using home-made equipment.

=== May ===
- 1 May – The first broadcasts from the 2EH Edinburgh radio station listed in The Radio Times. (Note: It is probable that 2EH Edinburgh broadcast prior to this date without being listed in The Radio Times.)
- 19 May – The British Broadcasting Company first broadcasts cellist Beatrice Harrison duetting live with a wild nightingale in her Surrey garden.

=== June ===
- 11 June – First broadcasts from the 2LV Liverpool radio station listed in The Radio Times. (Note: It is probable that 2LV Liverpool broadcast prior to this date without being listed in The Radio Times.)

=== July ===
- 8 July – First broadcasts from the 2LS Leeds radio station listed in The Radio Times. (Note: It is probable that 2LS Leeds broadcast prior to this date without being listed in The Radio Times.)

=== August ===
- 15 August – First broadcasts from the 6KH Hull radio station listed in The Radio Times. (Note: It is probable that 6KH Hull broadcast prior to this date without being listed in The Radio Times.)

=== September ===
- 15 September – First broadcasts from the 2BE Belfast radio station listed in The Radio Times. (Note: It is probable that 2BE Belfast broadcast prior to this date without being listed in The Radio Times.)
- 16 September – First broadcasts from the 5NG Nottingham radio station listed in The Radio Times. (Note: It is probable that 5NG Nottingham broadcast prior to this date without being listed in The Radio Times.)

=== October ===
- 13 October – The 1924 general election campaign is the first in the United Kingdom to include party political broadcasts, the first being made today on the BBC by Ramsay MacDonald on behalf of the Labour Party.
- 21 October – First broadcasts from the 6ST Stoke radio station listed in The Radio Times. (Note: It is probable that 6ST Stoke broadcast prior to this date without being listed in The Radio Times.)

=== November ===
- 12 November – First broadcasts from the 2DE Dundee radio station listed in The Radio Times. (Note: It is probable that 2DE Dundee broadcast prior to this date without being listed in The Radio Times.)

=== December ===
- 12 December – First broadcasts from the 5SX Swansea radio station listed in The Radio Times. (Note: It is probable that 5SX Swansea broadcast prior to this date without being listed in The Radio Times.)
- 28 December – First broadcasts from the 5XX Daventry radio station listed in The Radio Times. (Note: It is probable that 5XX Daventry broadcast prior to this date without being listed in The Radio Times.)

=== Undated ===
- The Wireless Chorus, predecessor of the BBC Singers, is formed.

== Births ==
- 11 February – Douglas Smith, radio announcer (died 1972)
- 19 March – Mary Wimbush, actress (died 2005)
- 3 April – Peter Hawkins, voice actor (died 2006)
- 20 April – Leslie Phillips, comic actor (died 2022)
- 23 April – Norman Painting, actor (died 2009)
- 1 May – Dennis Main Wilson, broadcast comedy producer (died 1997)
- 12 May – Tony Hancock, comedian (died 1968)
- 31 July – Garard Green, actor (died 2004)
- 4 October – Don Mosey, cricket commentator (died 1999)
- 15 November – Mike Raven, born (Austin) Churton Fairman, DJ, actor and sculptor (died 1997)
- 6 December – Eric Merriman, comedy scriptwriter (died 2003)
