= The World of Beachcomber =

British television comedy series (1968–1969)

- Title card
- Genre: Comedy
- Country of origin: United Kingdom

The World of Beachcomber is a lost surreal television comedy show produced by the BBC inspired by the Beachcomber column in the Daily Express newspaper.

== Description ==
The show, like the column, consisted of a series of unrelated pieces of humour. Links between the items were provided by Spike Milligan, dressed in a smoking jacket and cap, as in the cartoon logo above the newspaper column. The other actors were a Who's Who of British comedy of the time, encompassing almost every supporting player seen or heard in comedy. Likewise the writing staff included Milligan, Barry Took, John Junkin, Neil Shand and others. The producers were John Howard Davies and Duncan Wood.

In all, 19 episodes were produced beginning in January 1968. They were mostly shown on the new BBC2 channel, which broadcast in colour using the 625-line PAL standard. BBC2 was a minority-appeal culture channel, and thus allowed greater stretching of the boundaries of the art. Unfortunately, like many shows of the time, the original videotapes were wiped. Only one complete episode, on black and white 16mm film now survives of this show in the BBC archives, from the penultimate (20.10.69) edition. In addition to this, excerpts (origin unknown, but likely filmed inserts) for the 29.09.69 edition also survive. Audio soundtracks also survive for episodes Three (06.10.69) and Four (13.10.69) of the 1969 series. In addition to this, a soundtrack LP featuring excerpts from shows from series one was also released by PYE Records, and rereleased on audio cassette in 1997.

== Recurring items ==
- Courtroom sketches featuring Mr. Justice Cocklecarrot, played by Clive Dunn, and Twelve Red-Bearded Dwarfs, played by "Little People" suitably made up. One case involved the dwarfs suing themselves, so Mr. Justice Cocklecarrot rendered a judgement that they should apologize to themselves. The sketch ended with the dwarfs singing a song by Billy Eckstine, "I apologize", at the tops of their voices.
- Readings from the lists of Huntingdonshire Cabmen, wherein Michael Redgrave solemnly walked to a lectern, donned his reading glasses and read the names, in alphabetical order, with great seriousness, as one might read the names of the dead at a war memorial.
- Odd inventions explained by Dr. Strabismus (whom God preserve) of Utrecht (Spike Milligan with a high quavering German accent).
- Capt. Foulenough, portrayed as a moustachioed lothario who gains illicit admission to various social events and then disrupts them e.g. proposing a toast at a dinner, then producing many slices of toasted bread which he launches in all directions at the assembled diners.
- Spoof commercials for "Snibbo", (acted by Julian Orchard, who also portrayed Roland Milk, the aesthetic poet), usually a washing soap with a tendency to remove stains, buttons and skin. Also, with a sung jingle, "Threadgold's Thorough-grip Garterettes".
- The Filthistan Trio, a Music Hall act consisting of three 'Persians' and a plank.

== Cast ==
This list is inevitably incomplete.

- Ann Lancaster
- Frank Thornton
- Spike Milligan
- Clive Dunn
- Michael Redgrave
- Julian Orchard
- Hattie Jacques
- George Benson
- Patricia Hayes
