= Jazz at the Maltings =

British weekly series on BBC 2 (1968–1969)

Jazz at the Maltings is a weekly series on BBC 2 which featured some of the world's top jazz artists in concert at the Snape Maltings.

The series, produced by Terry Henebury and directed by Vernon Lawrence was first aired in autumn 1968. It was introduced by jazz musician Benny Green. The show was completely missing from the archives until 2016. A total of five episodes are now known to exist, having been found by Ray Langstone.

== Appearances ==
Date	Artist/s	Featuring
10 Oct 1968	Buddy Rich and his Orchestra	
17/10/1968	The Oscar Peterson Trio	Bass: Sam Jones
24/10/1968	Muddy Waters Blues Band	
07/11/1968	The Art Blakey Sextet	
14/11/1968	Ronnie Scott and the Band	
21/11/1968	Dizzie Gillespie's Big Band Reunion	
28/11/1968	Gary Burton Quartet	
05/12/1968	Count Basie Orchestra	Marlena Shaw
12/12/1968	The Newport All-Stars	
19/12/1968	Salena Jones and the Trombone Band	
27/12/1968	Special	Buddy Rich and his Orchestra; The Oscar Peterson Trio; The Newport All-Stars; Elvin Jones, Art Blakey, Max Roach; The Barney Kessel Trio; The Dizzy Gillespie Big Band; The Gary Burton Quartet with Red Norvo; The Earl Hines All-Stars; The Dave Brubeck Quartet featuring Gerry Mulligan; The Stars of Faith; Count Basie and his Orchestra
02/01/1969	The Earl Hines All-Stars	
09/01/1969	Barney Kessell	Bass: Kenny Baldock; Drums: Tony Crombie
16/01/1969	Max Roach on drums with members of The Art Blakey Sextet	Bill Hardman (trumpet); Julian Priester (trombone); Billy Harper (saxophone); Ronnie Mathews (piano); Lawrence Evans (bass)
23/01/1969	The Oscar Peterson Trio	Bass: Sam Jones; Drums: Bobby Durham
30/01/1969	Don Rendell+Ian Carr Quintet	Michael Garrick on piano; Dave Green on bass; Trevor Tomkins on drums
06/02/1969	The Horace Silver Quintet	Randy Brecker (trumpet); John Williams (saxophone); Bennie Maupin (bass); Billy Cobham (drums)
13/02/1969	Dave Brubeck Quartet	Gerry Mulligan
20/02/1969	The Stars of Faith	Piano: John Thompson
27/02/1969	Elvin Jones Trio	Joe Farrell on saxophone; Jimmy Garrison on bass
06/03/1969	Dizzy Gillespie Big Band Reunion	
13/03/1969	Red Norvo with the Gary Burton Quartet	
20/03/1969	Art Blakey Drum Workshop	Elvin Jones; Max Roach
27/03/1969	John Hendricks with Ronnie Scott and the Band	
03/04/1969	The Newport All Stars	Ruby Braff (cornet); Benny Carter (saxophone); Barney Kessel (guitar); Red Norvo (vibraphone); George Wein (piano); Kenny Baldock (bass) Tony Crombie (drums)
10/04/1969	Special	The Oscar Peterson Trio; The Gary Burton Quartet; Count Basie and his Orchestra; The Dizzy Gillespie Big Band Reunion; The Earl Hines All-Stars
