= Stranger in the City =

Stranger in the City may refer to:

- Stranger in the City (album), a 1977 album by John Miles
- Stranger in the City (1962 film), a Turkish drama film
- Stranger in the City (1961 film), a British short documentary film
- Stranger in the City, the sequel to the British television drama serial Stranger on the Shore

== See also ==
- Strangers in the City (disambiguation)
