= Holland Park Mews =

Mews street in Holland Park, London

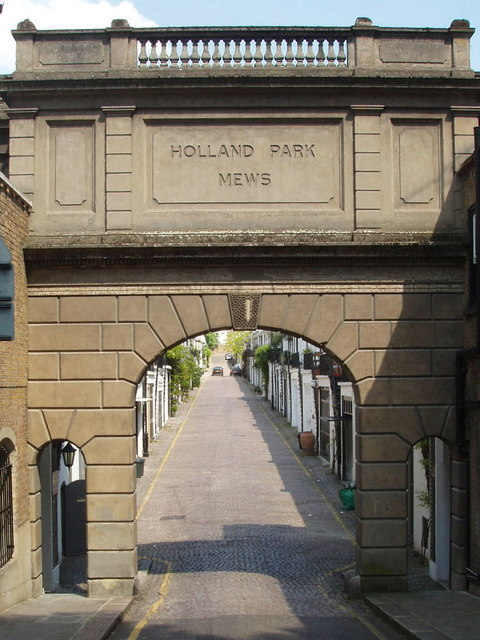
- The archway entrance to the mews in 2008

- Location within Greater London
- 51°30′21″N 0°12′24″W

History
- Built: 1862

Listed Building – Grade II
- Official name: Archway entrance from Holland Park
- Designated: 15 April 1969
- Reference no.: 1080591

Listed Building – Grade II
- Official name: 1–34 Holland Park Mews
- Designated: 15 April 1969
- Reference no.: 1191524

Listed Building – Grade II
- Official name: 35–67 Holland Park Mews
- Designated: 15 April 1969
- Reference no.: 1080592

Holland Park Mews is a mews street in the Holland Park district of the Royal Borough of Kensington and Chelsea in W11, London. The mews consists of 67 residential properties, originally built as 68 stables, on a cobbled road with two entrances from Holland Park. The west entrance passes under an arch listed Grade II on the National Heritage List for England. The arch was built in 1862, and the stables from 1860 to 1879.

In addition to the arch the houses either side of the mews are Grade II listed in two groups as Nos 1–34 and 35–67. The Historic England listing describes them as "buildings of unusual design and marked picturesqueness".

Bridget Cherry, writing in the 1991 London: North West edition of the Pevsner Architectural Guides, remarks of Holland Park Mews, "The grand entrance gate...and splendid parapets survive to distinguish these as very ritzy mews". The architectural critic Ian Nairn described the mews it as "a cathedral among mewses (sic)".

The actor Ian Holm was a former resident of the mews.

Roger Moore and Alexis Kanner filmed a scene from the 1969 film Crossplot on the mews, and Peter Cushing and Sue Lloyd went to a party held at the mews in the 1968 film Corruption.
