= Incense for the Damned =

1971 British film by Robert Hartford-Davis

- Film poster under its alternate title
- Directed by: Robert Hartford-Davis
- Screenplay by: Julian More
- Based on: Doctors Wear Scarlet by Simon Raven
- Produced by: Graham Harris executive: Peter Newbrook
- Starring: Patrick Macnee; Peter Cushing; Edward Woodward
- Cinematography: Desmond Dickinson
- Music by: Bobby Richards
- Production company: Lucinda Films
- Distributed by: Titan Film Distribution; Chevron Pictures (US)
- Release date: 1971
- Running time: 87 min
- Country: United Kingdom
- Language: English

Incense for the Damned (also known as Bloodsuckers, Freedom Seeker and Doctors Wear Scarlet) is a 1971 British horror film directed by Robert Hartford-Davis and starring Patrick Macnee, Johnny Sekka, Madeleine Hinde, Alexander Davion, Peter Cushing and Edward Woodward. It is based on the 1960 Simon Raven novel Doctors Wear Scarlet. The film centres on Richard Fountain, a scholar of Greek mythology at the University of Oxford, who has fallen under the influence of Chriseis, a mysterious Greek woman who is a modern-day vampire.

== Plot ==
Richard Fountain, a brilliant young don at Oxford's fictional Lancaster College, has lost touch with friends after going to Greece to research a book on mythology. Concerned about him, Penelope Goodrich, Richard's "informal" fiancée; Tony Seymour of the Foreign Office; and Bob Kirby, one of Richard's pupils, travel to Greece to find him. Tony goes to the office of Maj. Derek Longbow, the British military attaché, to ask his help in finding Richard. Derek tells him that Richard has fallen in with a strange woman named Chriseis and her unsavoury friends.

A catatonic Richard attends, but doesn't participate in, a drug-fuelled orgy, during which a woman is ritually sacrificed. Bob tells Tony that Richard "can't make it" with Penelope; Tony replies that Richard "has never made it with anyone". Derek then tells Tony of the rumour that Dr. Walter Goodrich, the Provost of Lancaster College and also Penelope's father, is the cause of Richard's impotence. Tony says that Bob has told him that Richard came to Greece "in search of some freedom. To seek his manhood'. Derek wonders aloud if Bob's 'African background' includes an overactive imagination.

Richard has been taken to a monastery on Hydra because of an unnamed "ancient disease" which "has to do with the blood". But the abbot reveals that Chriseis didn't want Richard cured, just kept alive. The abbot believes that Chriseis will soon tire of Richard and let him die. Penelope has a vision of Richard's death. According to Bob, it was only a hallucination caused by her overconsumption of the monks' potent moonshine in the hot sunshine. Bob, Tony and Derek leave her in the care of the monks and set out on mules to find the ancient fort that the abbot says Richard is in.

Arriving at the fort, they discover a still-catatonic Richard watching Chriseis direct the sacrifice of another woman. Derek, Tony and Bob burst in to rescue the woman. They succeed, but Chriseis and her friends escape with the mules. The next day, Derek sends a protesting Penelope back to the UK so that she won't see Richard in a poor condition. Near the fort and both mule-mounted, Derek pursues Chriseis up a steep path. Chriseis dismounts and runs. Derek follows. Chriseis slips on some rocks, which tumble down on Derek, knocking him over the cliff. Tony tries to save him, but he falls to his death.

Bob finds Chriseis drinking Richard's blood. During a struggle, she falls down the stone stairs and is apparently killed. Bob attempts to stake her, but Tony stops him. Tony and Bob return to the UK with Richard. After an apparent recovery, Richard goes back to his post at Oxford. Tony visits Dr. Halstrom, an expert in vampirism. Halstrom tells him that vampirism is a sado-masochistic sexual perversion which affects "frigid women and impotent men". He hints that Richard may already be a vampire.

Goodrich tells Richard that he'll have to deliver a scholarly speech at a college dinner. Richard agrees but is unhappy that Goodrich also plans to announce Penelope and Richard's "formal" engagement. At the dinner, Richard rises to speak, but instead of discussing his scholarship, he lambastes the Establishment. He declares "Love me, says the academic, and do exactly as I tell you". He calls academe "the protection racket of the Establishment" and denounces the dons as "thieves who have come to take your souls", pointing to Goodrich as the worst of the lot.

Richard and Penelope rush to their accommodation to make love, but Richard drinks her blood and kills her, revealing he is now a vampire. Afterwards, he flees across the rooftops with Bob in pursuit. During a struggle, Richard falls and is impaled on an iron fence.

Goodrich, who is also coroner for the college, holds a private inquest and tearfully concludes that Penelope and Richard took their own lives while of unsound mind.

Sometime later, Tony and Bob go to the mortuary to stake Richard and Penelope to prevent them from rising.

== Cast ==
- Patrick Macnee as Maj. Derek Longbow
- Peter Cushing as Dr. Walter Goodrich
- Edward Woodward as Dr. Eric Halstrom
- Alexander Davion as Tony Seymour (credited as Alex Davion)
- Johnny Sekka as Bob Kirby
- Patrick Mower as Richard Fountain
- Madeleine Hinde as Penelope Goodrich (credited as Madeline Hinde)
- Imogen Hassall as Chriseis
- William Mervyn as Marc Honeydew
- David Lodge as Col. Stavros
- John Barron as diplomat
- Valerie Van Ost as Don's Wife
- Theo Moreos as Mayor
- Nick Pandelides as Monk Superior
- Andreas Potamitis as Police Chief
- Theodosia Elefthreadon as old woman
- Christ Eleftheriades as monk
- Françoise Pascal as Girl at Orgy (uncredited)

== Production ==
Shooting took place in Greece and Cyprus during the spring of 1969. However, money ran out during production causing filming to halt; it resumed after additional financing was sourced. When production restarted, new scenes were written and new actors hired, the result of which, according to British film scholar John Hamilton, was that 'the old and new storylines were cobbled together into something loosely approaching a coherent storyline, with gaps in the narrative bridged by an unconvincing voice-over' by Davion. Hartford-Davis subsequently disowned the movie and the fictitious Michael Burrowes credited as director.

The film was given an X certificate by the British Board of Film Censors on 2 November 1971 after unspecified cuts were made. Titled Bloodsuckers in the US, the film was rated R by the Motion Picture Association of America (MPAA).

== Distribution ==
Hamilton writes that Incense for the Damned had only a limited theatrical release, after which "it was consigned to brief appearances over the next few years, propping up obscure double-bills". For example, a UK poster shows Incense for the Damned paired with the Swedish horror film Fear has 1,000 Eyes, while Bloodsuckers and the US/Philippines horror film Blood Thirst appear on a US poster. The US pair of films was released domestically on 14 May 1970.

== Critical reception ==
Monthly Film Bulletin wrote: "Certainly the film suffers at times from a lack of overall control (most of the unconvincing scenes in which Chriseis is chased around the Greek hillsides could have been trimmed) and in places an imaginative film-maker could easily have improved on the novel. Even so ... Incense for the Damned is well enough constructed to amount to a richly subversive exercise in the genre, and the various contrasts (between Oxford cricket pitch and Greek pagan temple) and ironies (the scarlet coated dons greedily consuming a College Feast while Richard vampirises the Principal's daughter) are not so much exploited as left to accumulate in power and significance. In this respect the comparative vacuum at a directorial level may well have finally benefited the film, for more overt shock tactics could only have undermined its pleasingly extravagant symbolic structure."

British film critic Phil Hardy calls Incense for the Damned a "fairly faithful adaptation of Simon Raven's modern vampire novel, Doctors Wear Scarlet". But he finds that the film fails to adequately convey the novel's notion that 'vampirism is not a supernatural phenomenon, but a sexual disturbance related to impotence". Hardy also says that the "subversive potential" of the story is wasted on time-consuming "depictions of 'hippy' decadence with clichéd psychedelic effects, badly staged chase sequences and facile oppositions between alleged Greek paganism and the genteelly repressive Oxford cricket pitch".

Hamilton points out the historical context of the film, noting that it was made "at a time when anxiety about the so-called counterculture movement was coming to its peak and the drugs, psychedelic music and anti-Vietnam War protests were taking a more sinister turn"; e.g. the Charles Manson-led murders in Los Angeles in August 1969. He calls the film an "inept and barely watchable mess" but adds that "it is no longer possible" to say how much of the blame for its failure "on almost every level' falls on Hartford-Davis and 'how much was the result of post-production interference".

Critic Gary A. Smith labels Incense for the Damned a "fragmented mess" and blames the producers for "Post-production tampering" which included "extensive editing ... the inclusion of a totally gratuitous psychedelic orgy scene (it runs a grueling seven minutes) and a pointless tacked-on ending". In the movie's favour, though, Smith says that the "colour location photography is often stunning".

== DVD releases ==
In addition to standalone DVD releases, the film can be found (as Bloodsuckers) as part of the 3-DVD box set Superstars of Horror: Volume 1: Peter Cushing (Umbrella Entertainment, 2005). In November 2023, Severin Films released the Blu-ray box set Cushing Curiosities, which includes the Bloodsuckers version of the film, with an audio commentary by Jonathan Rigby and Kevin Lyons.
