= Robert Hartford-Davis =

British film director, producer and writer (1923–1977)

- Born: William Henry Davis; July 23 1923; Ramsgate, Kent, England
- Died: June 12, 1977 (aged 53); Beverly Hills, California, U.S.
- Occupations: Film director, producer, writer

Robert Hartford-Davis (born William Henry Davis, 23 July 1923 – 12 June 1977) was an English film director, producer, and screenwriter, known mainly for his horror and crime B-movies. Little White Lies described him as "one of a number of British exploitation maestros who rose to prominence in the 1960s."

== Early life ==
Hartford-Davis was born William Henry Davis in Ramsgate, Kent. He began his career as an electrician and clapper boy in a South London film studio, where he went on to develop his skills as a camera operator. Around this time, he changed his name to avoid confusion with the late poet William Henry (W. H.) Davies.

== Career ==
During the 1950s, he directed a number of short films. Later in the decade, he became an agent and worked for Roy Rogers, amongst others (in England).

He made his feature directorial debut with the crime film Crosstrap (1962), adapted from a John Lymington novel, which proved somewhat controversial for its violence but was a commercial success. For decades, the film was considered lost and was on the BFI 75 Most Wanted until the 2010s, when it re-discovered and released on home media. Another of his films, Nobody Ordered Love (1971), is also considered lost and remains on the Most Wanted list as of 2026.

Hartford-Davis found success directing B-movies, many of them "ripped from the headlines" and self-authored. According to an article in Little White Lies, "Alongside the likes of Pete Walker and Michael Winner, Hartford-Davis could turn his hand to any touch-paper subject and churn out a slice of genre." He himself claimed in an interview "any story, however wild, can be commercially successful."

Initially he mostly made crime films, but later turned to directing horror pictures, like Corruption (1968), Incense for the Damned (1971), and The Fiend (1972). He also dabbled in comedies and sexploitation. He claimed to have only lost money once in his entire career, and following a downturn in the industry in the early '70s, self-financed some of his films.

In 1972, he traveled to the United States to direct a blaxploitation film, Black Gunn, based on a script he'd written originally set in London. It proved successful enough that he and producer John Heyman made another blaxploitation film, The Take, this time starring Billy Dee Williams.

Hartford-Davis eventually moved to the United States full-time, directing episodes of the television series Dog and Cat and Family.

== Personal life ==
Hartford-Davis married Betty Hale in 1943 and there were three children from this marriage; Jean, Marian and Penelope were born in the next ten years. His wife also co-wrote I'm Not Bothered and an innovative play on the trial of Christ, We the Guilty. Robert and Betty were divorced in 1957. Robert went on to marry three or four more times. There was also another son, Scott Hartford-Davis, born in the late fifties.

=== Death ===
Robert died on 12 June 1977 from a stroke. At the time, he was three days into filming the TV movie Murder in Peyton Place (1977). The film was completed by a different director.

== Filmography ==
=== Feature films ===
Year	Title	Functioned as			Notes
Year	Title	Director	Writer	Producer	Notes
1962	Crosstrap	Yes	No	No	
1963	The Yellow Teddy Bears	Yes	No	Yes	
1964	Saturday Night Out	Yes	No	Yes	
1964	The Black Torment	Yes	No	Yes	
1965	Gonks Go Beat	Yes	Yes	Yes	Co-writer with Peter Newbrook
1966	The Sandwich Man	Yes	Yes	No	Co-writer with Michael Bentine
1968	Corruption	Yes	No	No	
1969	The Smashing Bird I Used to Know	Yes	Yes	No	Co-writer with John Peacock
1971	Incense for the Damned	Yes	No	No	
1972	Nobody Ordered Love	Yes	No	Yes	Lost film
1972	The Fiend	Yes	No	Yes	
1972	Black Gunn	Yes	Story	No	
1974	The Take	Yes	No	No	

==== Producer only ====
Year	Title	Director	Notes
1963	That Kind of Girl	Gerry O'Hara	
1966	Press for Time	Robert Asher	

==== Writer only ====
Year	Title	Director	Notes
1969	Explosion	Jules Bricken	

=== Short films ===
Year	Title	Director	Writer	Producer
1955	Man on the Cliff	Yes	No	No
1955	Dollars for Sale	No	Yes	Yes
1960	A Christmas Carol	Yes	Yes	Yes
1961	Stranger in the City	Yes	Yes	No

=== Television ===
Year	Title	Notes
1956	I'm Not Bothered	2 episodes
1960	Police Surgeon	Episode: "You Won't Feel a Thing"
1977	Dog and Cat	
1977	Family	2 episodes
1977	Murder in Peyton Place	TV movie; Died during production and replaced by Bruce Kessler
