= Duke Callaghan =

American cinematographer (1914–2002)

- Born: Andrew J. Callaghan; 12 February 1914; Kansas, U.S.A.
- Died: 21 December 2002 (aged 88); Los Angeles, California, U.S.A.
- Occupation: Cinematographer

Andrew "Duke" Callaghan (February 12, 1914 – December 21, 2002) was an American cinematographer, best known for his work on television series such as Adam-12, Hart to Hart, and Miami Vice, the latter for which he received a Primetime Emmy nomination for Outstanding Cinematography for a Series. He was a frequent collaborator of directors Sydney Pollack and John Milius, shooting films like Jeremiah Johnson and The Yakuza for the former and Conan the Barbarian for the latter.

== Filmography ==
=== Film ===
Year	Title	Director	Notes
1968	The Scalphunters	Sydney Pollack	
1972	Jeremiah Johnson	Sydney Pollack	
1974	The Take	Robert Hartford-Davis	
1974	The Yakuza	Sydney Pollack	Co-cinematographer with Kôzô Okazaki
1976	The Last Hard Men	Andrew V. McLaglen	
1982	Conan the Barbarian	John Milius	
1984	Lovelines	Rod Amateau	

=== Television ===
Year	Title	Notes
1971–73	Adam-12	35 episodes
1974	Nakia	Episode: "No Place to Hide"
1975	Get Christie Love!	Episode: "The Deadly Sport"
1977	Walt Disney's Wonderful World of Color	Episode: "The Bluegrass Special"
1977	ABC Weekend Special	Episode: 'Tales of the Nunundaga"
1977	Just a Little Inconvenience	Television film
1978	Columbo	2 episodes
1978–79	Centennial	Miniseries
1979–81	Hart to Hart	27 episodes
1982	The Devlin Connection	13 episodes
1983–84	Magnum, P.I.	24 episodes
1983	Tales of the Gold Monkey	2 episodes
1984–85	Miami Vice	15 episodes Nominated- Primetime Emmy Award for Outstanding Cinematography for a Drama Series
1985	Code of Vengeance	Television film
