= The Black Torment =

1964 British film by Robert Hartford-Davis

- British original poster
- Directed by: Robert Hartford-Davis
- Written by: Derek Ford; Donald Ford
- Produced by: Tony Tenser; Michael Klinger
- Starring: John Turner; Heather Sears; Ann Lynn
- Cinematography: Peter Newbrook
- Edited by: Alastair McIntyre
- Music by: Robert Richards
- Production company: Compton Films
- Release date: 20 October 1964
- Running time: 90 minutes
- Country: United Kingdom
- Language: English

The Black Torment (a.k.a. Estate of Insanity) is a 1964 British gothic horror film directed by Robert Hartford-Davis and starring John Turner, Heather Sears and Ann Lynn. It was scripted by brothers Donald and Derek Ford.

== Plot ==
The film opens with Lucy Judd, a young woman, running in panic through a nocturnal wood. She is tracked down and cornered by a figure in black who puts his hands around her throat.

The scene then switches to daytime and a horse-drawn carriage containing Sir Richard Fordyke and his new bride Elizabeth, who is being brought from London to meet her new father-in-law for the first time. Elizabeth is nervous and anxious, hoping to make a good impression but worried that she will not pass muster. Sir Richard assures her that his father will love her just as he does, but warns her that his father is "a shadow of the man he once was", having been crippled by a stroke and now able only to communicate by sign language. A complicating factor is that the only person who can interpret his signing is the devoted Diane, sister of Sir Richard's first wife Anne who died by her own hand four years previously after becoming deranged over her inability to bear a child.

On arrival in his home village, Sir Richard, having expected a warm welcome after his absence and marriage, finds himself treated with rudeness and barely disguised suspicion by his tenants, such as Black John, the local blacksmith. His coachman Tom asks a villager the reason for the sudden hostility towards his previously well-liked master and is told that shocking events have been taking place, culminating in the rape and murder of Lucy who, before she died, screamed out Sir Richard's name. Sir Richard and Elizabeth's arrival at Fordyke Hall is met by an oddly stiff and formal welcome from the staff and Diane. When challenged, steward Seymour tells Sir Richard of wild rumours circulating in the village about Lucy's last words. Sir Richard points out that he was probably in London when the attack happened, but Seymour states that logic cannot assuage the villagers' primitive suspicions and talk of witchcraft, particularly since enquiries have established there were no strangers in the vicinity at the time.

Events quickly take a sinister turn as a copy of Anne's suicide note is anonymously delivered to Elizabeth. The window from which Anne jumped becomes mysteriously unbolted at night. Sir Richard sees what he believes to be the ghost of his dead wife in the garden. Meanwhile, after enjoying an illicit nocturnal frolic in a barn with her fiancé, Mary, one of the housemaids, is strangled like Lucy (but not raped). A stablehand tells Sir Richard that one of his horses is being taken out and ridden at night by an unknown woman, and a saddle inscribed with Anne's name is delivered. The saddler insists that Sir Richard ordered it in person, despite Sir Richard's insistence that he has been nowhere near the village for three months. Colonel Wentworth informs Sir Richard that there are numerous reports of his having been seen riding around the neighbourhood at night during his supposed absence in London, pursued by "Anne" who keeps shouting the word "murderer". Those who have seen the spectacle are speaking of witchcraft and devilry.

Unable to explain the strange goings-on, Sir Richard doubts his sanity, and his marriage comes under strain as Elizabeth herself struggles to make sense of events. When Sir Richard again sees the ghost in the garden at night, he mounts his horse and gives chase, only to find himself being pursued on horseback by a white-clad "Anne". He is apprehended by the local militia but is let go. He returns to Fordyke Hall, where Elizabeth insists he left her only moments before. Believing she too has turned against him and is now somehow involved in the plot to incriminate him or drive him mad, he attempts to strangle her, managing to stop himself from killing her just in time. Ultimately, he manages to uncover the real culprits and their motives but cannot prevent another murder from being committed. He has to take part in a vicious swordfight before he can reveal the truth.

== Cast ==
- John Turner as Sir Richard Fordyke
- Heather Sears as Lady Elizabeth Fordyke
- Ann Lynn as Diane
- Peter Arne as Seymour
- Norman Bird as Harris
- Raymond Huntley as Colonel John Wentworth
- Joseph Tomelty as Sir Giles Fordyke
- Francis de Wolff as Black John
- Patrick Troughton as Regis
- Derek Newark as Tom
- Edina Ronay as Lucy Judd
- Annette Whiteley as Mary
- Kathy McDonald as Kate
- Roger Croucher as Brian
- Charles Houston as Jenkins

== Critical reception ==
Monthly Film Bulletin said: "Apart from some conventionally attractive sets and costumes, and a few effectively lowering shots of Sir Giles gesticulating helplessly in his wheelchair, this film has virtually nothing to offer. The script signals its plot points (the existence of the brother, for instance) with massive insistence, and Robert Hartford-Davis appears to have no idea what to do with his camera, leaving it focused pretty much at random on anything that happens to be at hand. The actors mouth their Olde Englishe dialogue with fervent embarrassment."

Variety wrote: "Set a British film in the 18th Century and stage it in some country mansion, and it's a fair bet that the characters will be involved in some pretty eerie hocus-pocus. The Black Torment is such a period chiller, with a somewhat nonsensical story dominated by routine thrills. It is lushly lensed by Peter Newbrook in Eastmancolor, handsomely mounted and played with sufficient intensity to hold suspense. A trick ending is glibly explained away but until then customers will have had their fill of mild kicks. ... Robert Hartford-Davis, producer and director of the film, has given it the full treatment in the way of production values. And, despite some unintentional laughs, he has managed to keep the cast within the bounds that will retain audience speculation as to who's done what to whom, why and when. ... It is Miss Judd who has the unfortunate task of setting the keynote of the film before the credits. She is chased panting through a wood but it is not her fault that her hysterical breathing rings through the theatre with the strength of Gale Force 9."

Leslie Halliwell said: "Agreeably unpretentious period ghost story (with a rational explanation). Not exactly good but better than one might expect."

The Radio Times Guide to Films gave the film 2/5 stars, writing: "This barnstorming period horror is no longer the marrow-chiller it once was. Nevertheless, it has a literate script and still delivers some mild shocks as it wheels out a time-honoured tale of suicide, gloomy castles, ghosts and mad relatives locked in the attic. It's directed by Robert Hartford-Davis, an unsung hero of British horror, and actors John Turner and Heather Sears work miracles in making this gothic melodrama believable."

Horror: The Aurum Film Encyclopedia says of the film: "This is a crude British attempt to match the Italian horror movies of the period. The sloppily constructed plot ...The film's tone is set in a pre-credit sequence showing a young woman (Ronay) running through the woods trying to escape a murderous rapist. The cutting is predictable, the sound grossly over-emphatic, the colour ugly and the tension non-existent. Sears, so effective in Fisher's The Phantom of the Opera, is miscast as Turner's new bride."

In Creature Features Movie Guide Strikes Again John Stanley writes that the cast "work to make all this unbelievable stuff believable."
