= Tony Masters =

Tony Masters may refer to:

- Taskmaster (character), a Marvel Comics supervillain
- Tony Masters, a character in the Oz TV series
- Anthony Masters (1919–1990), British production designer
