= The Smashing Bird I Used to Know =

1969 British film by Robert Hartford-Davis

- U.S. publicity poster
- Directed by: Robert Hartford-Davis
- Written by: John Peacock
- Produced by: Peter Newbrook
- Starring: Renée Asherson; Patrick Mower; Dennis Waterman; Madeleine Hinde; Maureen Lipman
- Cinematography: Peter Newbrook
- Edited by: Don Deacon
- Music by: Bobby Richards
- Production company: Titan International
- Distributed by: American International Pictures (U.S.)
- Release date: 25 August 1969
- Running time: 95 minutes
- Country: United Kingdom
- Language: English

The Smashing Bird I Used to Know is a 1969 British drama/sexploitation film, directed by Robert Hartford-Davis and starring Renée Asherson, Patrick Mower, Dennis Waterman, Madeleine Hinde and Maureen Lipman. It was written by John Peacock. The film was not released in the U.S. until 1973, retitled by AIP as School for Unclaimed Girls. AIP also reissued the film a year later under their shadow company (production company) United Producers Organization, as Hell House Girls. It is also known as House of Unclaimed Women.

As with other Hartford-Davis films, The Smashing Bird I Used to Know contains elements from different genres including psychological drama and social commentary. It is best known however as a sexploitation piece featuring nudity, attempted rape and lesbianism. The film features the first screen credit of the then 15-year-old Lesley-Anne Down in a supporting role.

== Plot ==
Nine-year-old Nicki Johnson attends a funfair with her parents. Her father takes her on a merry-go-round ride, where Nicki becomes frightened. Attempting to reach over to comfort her, her father instead falls from the ride and is crushed to death in its machinery. The tragedy leaves Nicki traumatised, particularly as in its aftermath she overhears comments suggesting that she was to blame for what happened, which leave her with a permanent sense of guilt.

Seven years on and Nicki is a troubled and confused teenager living with her mother, plagued by flashback nightmares and with an obsession with horses and riding stemming from the merry-go-round horror. Since being widowed, her mother Anne has withdrawn emotionally from her daughter and has sought consolation with a succession of younger lovers. Her latest boyfriend Harry, who Nicki detests, is a sleazy con-artist who makes his living out of latching on to wealthy older women and fleecing them financially before moving on. Nicki is left largely to her own devices and often plays truant from school, spending the time with her boyfriend Peter.

Returning home one day from a riding lesson, Nicki finds herself alone in the house with Harry. He attempts to seduce her, and when she proves resistant, taunts her with the fact that her trust fund is now in his control. A struggle ensues, during which Nicki stabs him several times, leaving him seriously injured. For her trouble, she is sent to a remand home for young women with emotional and behavioural problems.

Coming from a middle-class background, Nicki is overwhelmed by her new environment among a large group of tough, delinquent and maladjusted girls, where bullying and violence is the norm. She tries to keep a low profile to avoid being victimised, but matters improve when she strikes up an unlikely friendship with lesbian fellow inmate Sarah. Despite Sarah's fearsome reputation as one of the toughest girls on the block, she becomes Nicki's unofficial protector. As the friendship develops, Sarah reveals her more vulnerable side to Nicki and they discover that they have much in common with regard to how they ended up where they are. Sarah makes it clear that her feelings towards Nicki go beyond friendship, and a tentative intimacy develops between the pair.

Sarah and Nicki finally make the decision to abscond together rather than face the prospect of being sent to borstal. Soon after, Sarah is apprehended, but Nicki avoids capture and manages to make it to Peter's flat in the village where he works for an interior designer. The sensible Peter tries to convince her that she has done herself no favours by running away from her problems and that in the long-term it is better that she should face up to them by returning to the remand home. Nicki is initially unconvinced, but finally realises that he is right. She agrees to being driven back; but as they arrive at a bridge with a bottleneck passage, an approaching truck causes them to veer off the road and over the bridge to their deaths.

== Cast ==
- Renée Asherson as Anne Johnson
- Dennis Waterman as Peter
- Patrick Mower as Harry Spenton
- Madeleine Hinde as Nicki Johnson
- Faith Brook as Dr. Sands
- Janina Faye as Susan
- David Lodge as Richard Johnson
- Maureen Lipman as Sarah
- Colette O'Neil as Miss Waldron
- Megs Jenkins as Matron
- Derek Fowlds as Geoffrey
- Lesley-Anne Down as Diana
- Cleo Sylvestre as Carlien
- Valerie Van Ost as Amanda
- Sheila Steafel as young woman

== Production ==
A scene outside a cinema shows the poster for Hartford-Davis’ previous film Corruption starring Peter Cushing in the background. The village and interior designer shop where Peter works was filmed in Petworth in West Sussex.

== Critical reception ==
The Monthly Film Bulletin said "A preposterous blend of cheap melodrama and pat psychology, with a large slice of life after lights out in a girls remand home thrown in for good measure. Robert Hartford-Davis' bludgeoning direction combines a frenzied excess of tricksiness (monochrome filters, repeated flashbacks in negative, a ludicrous jigsaw of superimposed flash shots) with a tasteless relish for gory detail, like the recurring close-ups of poor Nicki's father's head being mangled by the iron hoof of a mechanical horse; and one is not surprised to find him working in a shot of a poster advertising his last film. The story is trite, the dialogue almost unbelievably banal, and the acting generally feeble, with the possible exception of Maureen Lipman as one of the less unlikely remand home inmates."
