= Valerie Van Ost =

English actress (1944–2019)

- Van Ost in The Satanic Rites of Dracula (1973)
- Born: 25 July 1944; Berkhamsted, Hertfordshire, England, UK
- Died: 10 September 2019 (aged 75); Hampshire, England, UK
- Occupations: Actress, casting

Valerie Van Ost (25 July 1944 – 10 September 2019) was an English actress.

== Acting career ==
At school, Van Ost became the youngest adult dancer at the London Palladium before moving into films and television at the age of 18. She appeared in four Carry On films - Carry On Cabby (1963), Carry On Don't Lose Your Head (1967), Carry On Doctor (also 1967) and Carry On Again Doctor (1969). Her other film roles included The Beauty Jungle (1964), Mister Ten Per Cent (1967), Casino Royale (1967), Corruption (1968), The Smashing Bird I Used to Know (1969), Incense for the Damned (1971), and the Hammer horror film The Satanic Rites of Dracula (1973). She appeared as the dim-witted Penny in an episode of The Avengers entitled "Dead Man's Treasure" (1967), and a year later was considered for the part of Diana Rigg's replacement as Steed's sidekick. She also appeared in the 1966 mini-episode of the same series entitled "The Case of the Missing Corpse" (broadcast in the U.S. but not in the U.K.) made to advertise the change to colour of the previously black and white production. In addition she appeared in the ITV series, Mrs Thursday (1966), in the second episode of the first series as Sandra Willing, a potential secretary.

== Post-acting ==
Van Ost retired from performing in 1982 to form a casting company with her husband, Andrew Millington.

== Death ==
Van Ost died from liver cancer on 10 September 2019 at the age of 75.

== Filmography ==
Year	Title	Role	Notes
1962	On the Beat	Woman at Hairdressers	Uncredited
1962	Edgar Wallace Mysteries	Showgirl	Uncredited - Locker Sixty-Nine episode
1963	Carry On Cabby	Glamcab Driver	Uncredited
1964	The Beauty Jungle	Beauty Contestant	Uncredited
1967	Carry On Don't Lose Your Head	Second Lady / Girl at Execution	
1967	Mister Ten Per Cent	Girl at Theatre Party	Uncredited
1967	Casino Royale	Girl at Roulette Table	Uncredited
1967	Carry On Doctor	Nurse Parkin	
1968	Corruption	Girl in the Train	
1969	The Smashing Bird I Used to Know	Amanda	
1969	Carry On Again Doctor	Out-Patients Sister	
1971	Incense for the Damned	Don's wife	
1971	The Insomniac	The Girl	
1973	The Satanic Rites of Dracula	Jane	
