= Divorce His, Divorce Hers =

- UK DVD cover
- Genre: Drama; Romance
- Written by: John Hopkins
- Directed by: Waris Hussein
- Starring: Elizabeth Taylor; Richard Burton
- Composer: Stanley Myers
- Countries of origin: United States, United Kingdom
- Original language: English

Production
- Executive producers: Patrick Dromgoole; John Heyman; Mike Towers
- Producers: Terence Baker; Gareth Wigan
- Production locations: Acapulco; Bavaria Studios; Rome
- Cinematography: Gábor Pogány; Ernst Wild
- Editor: John Bloom
- Running time: 148 minutes
- Production companies: World Film Services, HTV - ITV Wales & West

Original release
- Network: ABC
- Release: February 6 – February 7, 1973

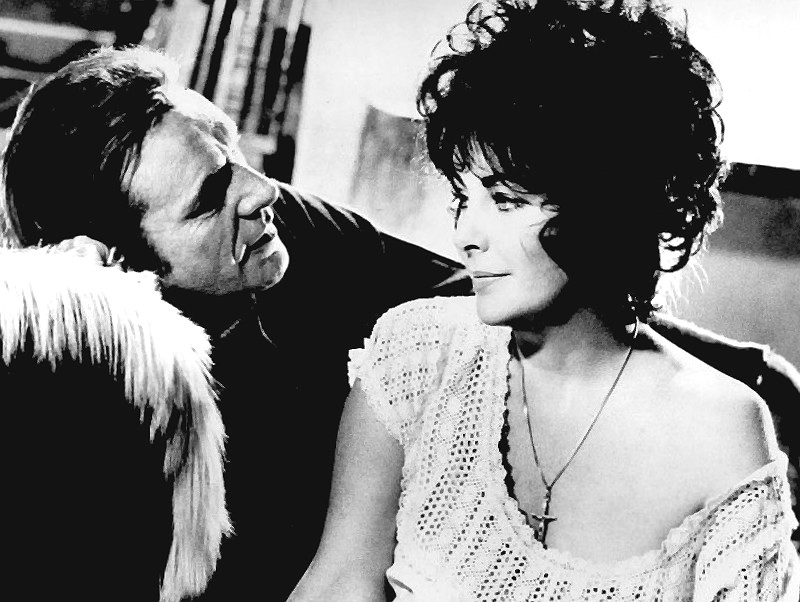
Richard Burton and Elizabeth Taylor.

Divorce His, Divorce Hers is a 1973 British/American made-for-television drama film starring Elizabeth Taylor and Richard Burton. The film examines the conflicted emotions felt by a couple whose 18-year marriage has frayed beyond repair. The first half of the film (Divorce His) details the story from the husband's perspective, and the second half (Divorce Hers) takes the wife's perspective. It is the final film to star both Burton and Taylor together.

The film, which was directed by Waris Hussein, from a script by John Hopkins, was originally presented in a two-part broadcast on U.S. television on February 6–7, 1973 (appearing on the Tuesday and Wednesday editions of the ABC Movie of the Week), although it was theatrically released in France in 1974. The critic Clive James wrote after the television screening in Britain (June 24 and 25,1973): "After movies as monumentally lousy as Bluebeard and Hammersmith is Out it was good to see Burton chipping some of the rust off his technique."

== Cast ==
- Richard Burton: Martin Reynolds
- Elizabeth Taylor: Jane Reynolds
- Carrie Nye: Diana Proctor
- Barry Foster: Donald Trenton, Martin's Partner
- Gabriele Ferzetti: Turi Livicci
- Ronald Radd: Angus McIntyre
- Thomas Baptiste: Minister
- Mark Colleano: Tommy Reynolds
- Rosalyn Landor: Peggy Reynolds
- Daniela Surina: Franca
- Rudolph Walker: Kaduna
- Eva Griffith: Judith Reynolds

== Home media ==
Divorce His/Divorce Hers was released on DVD in Australia by Flashback Entertainment, Cat. 8893.
