= Roger Croucher =

English actor and director (1936–2022)

Roger Croucher (19 April 1936 – 23 May 2022) was a British actor, theatrical director and educator. His theatrical career included periods with the Royal Shakespeare Company, the Royal Court Theatre and in London's West End. He was later principal of the London Academy of Music and Dramatic Art, a professor at Boston University and president of the American Academy of Dramatic Arts.

== Early life and education ==
Roger Croucher was born on 19 April 1936 in Maidstone, Kent, England. From 1945 to 1950 he attended St Paul's Cathedral School in the City of London, where he was head chorister. From 1950 to 1954 he was a pupil at Cranbrook School in Kent. He went on to study English literature, language and drama at the University of Oxford.

== Actor ==
Croucher started acting while still at school. At Cranbrook, he was a member of the school's dramatic society, playing Mr Puff in Sheridan's The Critic and Bolingbroke in Richard II. At Oxford he was a member of the Oxford University Dramatic Society, where he appeared as Antony in Dryden's All For Love and as Attius Tullius in Coriolanus.

Croucher began his professional stage career with appearances at the Oxford Playhouse, the Civic Theatre in Chesterfield and the Belgrade Theatre in Coventry. In 1961 he made his West End debut at the Arts Theatre in Jean Genet's Deathwatch.

In 1962 he joined the Royal Shakespeare Company (RSC). He appeared in David Rudkin's Afore Night Come, John Whiting's The Devils and as Alexander in Troilus and Cressida. In 1964 he took the lead in Richard II at the Lincoln Theatre. He also played the lead in Little Malcolm and his Struggle Against the Eunuchs by David Halliwell at the Leicester Phoenix. In 1967 he played Tranio in The Taming of the Shrew at The Old Vic.

Croucher also appeared in a number of films, notably The Black Torment (1964), Genghis Khan (1965) and The Fighting Prince of Donegal (1966), as well as several TV dramas.

== Theatrical director and educator ==
In 1971, after a brief period directing student productions at the London Academy of Music and Dramatic Art (LAMDA) and at the Royal Academy of Dramatic Art (RADA), Croucher joined the Royal Court Theatre as a director at the Theatre Upstairs, a post he held until 1975. His productions included Friday by Hugo Claus, Dreams of Mrs Fraser by Gabriel Josipovici and short plays by Samuel Beckett. In 1975 he took part in the Joe Orton Festival at the Royal Court, directing a revival of Entertaining Mr Sloane. After a three-month run at the Royal Court, he took the play to the Duke of York's Theatre where it ran for a further three months.

In 1978 he was appointed principal of LAMDA, a post he held until 1994. During his tenure, he extended the length and scope of the existing courses and introduced new courses in stage management and production. He also continued to direct, regularly taking student productions to continental Europe.

In 1994 he moved to the US to become Professor of Theatre Arts at Boston University.

In 2000 he became president of the American Academy of Dramatic Arts (AADA), dividing his time between the school's Los Angeles and New York branches. One of his first duties was to officiate at the ribbon-cutting ceremony of the school's central Hollywood campus on North La Brea Avenue. During his period of office, he implemented a new computer system, introduced e-mail on both campuses and oversaw the development of the academy's website. He left the post to return to the UK in 2010.

== Family life and death ==
Roger Croucher was the younger brother of Michael Croucher, who had a distinguished career as a television documentary maker with the BBC.

Roger Croucher died on 23 May 2022 at the age of 86.
