= Heather Sears =

British actress (1935–1994)

- 1950s portrait by Vivienne
- Born: 28 September 1935; Kensington, London, England
- Died: 3 January 1994 (aged 58); Hinchley Wood, Surrey, England
- Education: Royal Central School of Speech and Drama
- Occupation: Actress
- Years active: 1955–1989

Heather Christine Sears (28 September 1935 – 3 January 1994) was a British stage and screen actress.

== Early life ==
Sears was the daughter of distinguished London doctor William Gordon Sears and Eileen Gould.

Although not from an acting family, she was performing in plays at the age of five, and writing them at the age of eight. Sears had a long association with French culture, which began when she spent summers in Brittany with her pen pal Michelle where she learned to speak French fluently.

Sears was educated at St Winifred's School, Llanfairfechan until she was 16, when she followed her elder sister Ann Sears (1933–1992) to the Central School of Speech and Drama in London. During her last year, she signed a seven-year contract with Romulus Films, which allowed her six months per year to act on the stage and for television. This was made possible through film director Jack Clayton, her friend and mentor.

After leaving school, Sears spent time in Paris performing voiceover and dubbing work and socialising with artists and writers such as Pablo Picasso, Albert Camus and Arthur Koestler.

== Early career ==
Sears began performing with the Windsor Repertory Company at the Theatre Royal, Windsor in 1955. Her film début was a minor role in Michael Truman's Touch and Go the same year, followed by a part in Maurice Elvey's film version of comedy Dry Rot (1956) as the naive Susan.

At 21, Sears replaced Mary Ure in the part of Alison in John Osborne's Look Back in Anger, playing alongside Alan Bates and Richard Pasco. Shortly thereafter, she played Claire Bloom's role in Ring Round the Moon.

Her title role in David Miller's film The Story of Esther Costello (1957) brought Sears international acclaim. Joan Crawford chose Sears to play the blind, deaf and mute 15-year-old who is adopted by a rich American socialite. After completing her work on The Story of Esther Costello, Sears married Tony Masters, one of the two art directors of the film. A year later she was nominated for the Golden Globe award and also received the British Film Academy award for best British actress of the year. After this initial success, she alternated between film and theatre roles until the mid-1960s.

In London, Sears appeared at the Royal Court Theatre with Alan Bates and Richard Pearce in Jean Giraudoux's The Apollo of Bellac under the direction of John Dexter, in Michael Hastings' Yes and at the Lyric Theatre, Hammersmith in Julien Green's play South. On screen, she was cast in Room at the Top (1959) as Susan Brown, the naive daughter of an industrial magnate (Donald Wolfit) who falls for social climber Joe Lampton (Laurence Harvey). Sears had a lifelong friendship with Simone Signoret, who stars as her married rival for Joe Lampton's affections.

Sears travelled to Australia to appear in the last Ealing Studios film, The Siege of Pinchgut (1959), in which she played a hostage who forms a romantic liaison with an escaped convict. While top billed her role was relatively small.

One year later, in the film adaptation of Lawrence's semi-autobiographical novel Sons and Lovers (1960) directed by Jack Cardiff, she appeared as Miriam, the girlfriend and intellectual companion of Paul Morel (Dean Stockwell).

In Hammer's production of The Phantom of the Opera (1962), Sears played the opera singer Christine Charles. Her singing voice was dubbed by opera performer Pat Clark.

She appeared in The Black Torment (1964) as Lady Elizabeth, her last feature-film role for many years.

== Later life and career ==
Sears reduced her work commitments to raise her three sons, but she continued to appear on television in many BBC and ITV dramas until 1981. She also appeared as Grusha in Brecht's The Caucasian Chalk Circle at the Chichester Festival Theatre in 1969 and in Alan Ayckbourn's comedy How the Other Half Loves in London's West End.

In the 1970s, Sears returned to provincial repertory theatre. She was based at the Haymarket Theatre in Leicester, where she played title roles in classical plays by Sophocles (Antigone and Elektra), Shakespeare, Goldsmith, Dostoyevsky, Ibsen (Hedda Gabler) and Strindberg (Miss Julie), as well as in the work of more modern playwrights such as Liane Aukin (Little Lamb), Brecht (The Caucasian Chalk Circle), Ayckbourn (How the Other Half Loves), Rattigan and Pinter. She also toured with the One-Woman-Show playing Virginia Woolf. She later appeared in a television film adaptation of Dickens' semi-autobiographical novel Great Expectations (1974) as Biddy. In 1989, she made her final screen appearance in The Last Day of School, in which she played a working mother and entrepreneur.

In the last ten years of her life, Sears travelled extensively, spending many months in Mexico, China, Italy, North Africa and Egypt. Her husband, production designer Anthony Masters, died in May 1990 while on holiday with her in the south of France, where the couple would visit every year during the Cannes Film Festival. She did not remarry.

Sears died at the age of 58 in early 1994 of multiple organ failure caused by cancer at the family home in Hinchley Wood near Esher, Surrey. Her son Adam Masters became a film and television editor while his brothers Giles and Dominic became feature-film art directors.

== Filmography ==
=== Film ===
Year	Title	Role	Notes
1955	Touch and Go	Student	
1956	Dry Rot	Susan	
1957	The Story of Esther Costello	Esther Costello	
1959	Room at the Top	Susan Brown	
1959	The Siege of Pinchgut	Ann Fulton	
1960	Sons and Lovers	Miriam	
1962	The Phantom of the Opera	Christine Charles	
1964	Saturday Night Out	Penny	
1964	The Black Torment	Lady Elizabeth Fordyke	
1989	The Last Day of School		

=== Television ===
Year	Title	Role	Notes
1956	The Death of the Heart	Portia	TV film
1957	Sunday Night Theatre	Emily Webb	"Our Town"
1959	Playhouse 90	Barbara	"A Corner of the Garden"
1959	ITV Television Playhouse	Stella	"The Paraguayan Harp"
1961	BBC Sunday-Night Play	Sheila Birling / Nicole	"An Inspector Calls", "A Reason for Staying"
1963	Jezebel ex UK	Maxine	"Sea of Doubt"
1963	BBC Sunday-Night Play	Kathie Harland	"Trial Run"
1963	ITV Play of the Week	Doris Mead	"The Gioconda Smile"
1964	Playdate	Hilary	"The Sponge Room"
1964	The Wednesday Play	Zinalda	"First Love"
1965	Love Story	Geraldine Hopper	"A Guide to the Ruins"
1966–67	The Informer	Helen Lambert	Main role
1970	W. Somerset Maugham	Margaret Bronson	"Footprints in the Jungle"
1972	The Main Chance	Mary Wingrove	"Widow's Mite"
1973	Away from It All	Rachel	"The Safe House"
1974	Great Expectations	Biddy	TV film
1981	Tales of the Unexpected	Margaret Pearson	"There's One Born Every Minute"
1984	Weekend Playhouse	Kate Hanson	"Change Partners"

== Awards and nominations ==
Year	Award	Category	Nominated work	Result
1958	15th Golden Globe Awards	Best Supporting Actress – Motion Picture	The Story of Esther Costello	Nominated
1958	11th British Academy Film Awards	Best British Actress	The Story of Esther Costello	Won

== Bibliography ==
- cf. Obituary Heather Sears. In: The Times, 27 January 1994, Features
- cf. Robin Midgely: An early coming of age. In: Manchester Guardian Weekly, 30 January 1994, p. 10
- cf. Adam Benedick: Obituary: Heather Sears. In: The Independent, 19 January 1994, p. 14
- cf. Biography from Allmovie
- Internet Movie Database
