= Esquire Records (UK) =

- Founded: 1947
- Founder: Carlo Krahmer; Peter Newbrook
- Genre: Jazz, blues
- Country of origin: UK

Esquire Records was a UK jazz record company and label founded by Carlo Krahmer and Peter Newbrook in 1947. It issued recordings by British musicians and others, under licence, from the American Prestige label, the Chicago blues label Delmark, and the Swedish Metronome label. The company lasted until the mid-1970s; after Krahmer's death it was run by his widow, Greta Krahmer. In the 1980s, Newbrook (died 2009) reissued much of the Esquire jazz catalogue in an "Esquire Treasure Chest" series of LPs. Newbrook sold the catalogue in the early 1990s to Marathon Media International, who subsequently sold it on.

The company had a subsidiary, Starlite Records, for non-jazz recordings, including skiffle.

== See also ==
- Lists of record labels
