= The Take (1974 film) =

1974 British film by Robert Hartford-Davis

- Theatrical release poster
- Directed by: Robert Hartford-Davis
- Written by: Franklin Coen; Del Reisman
- Based on: Sir, You Bastard by G. F. Newman
- Produced by: Howard Brandy; Stanley Rubin; Rick Senat
- Starring: Billy Dee Williams; Eddie Albert; Frankie Avalon; Sorrell Booke; Tracy Reed; Albert Salmi
- Cinematography: Duke Callaghan
- Edited by: David de Wilde; Aaron Stell
- Music by: Fred Karlin
- Production company: World Film Services
- Distributed by: Columbia Pictures
- Release date: May 15, 1974 (Los Angeles)
- Running time: 91 minutes
- Countries: United Kingdom; United States
- Language: English
- Budget: $1 million

The Take is a 1974 British-American action neo noir crime drama film directed by Robert Hartford-Davis and starring Billy Dee Williams, Eddie Albert, Frankie Avalon, Sorrell Booke, Tracy Reed, and Albert Salmi. It is based on the 1970 novel Sir, You Bastard by G. F. Newman. The film was released by Columbia Pictures in May 1974.

== Plot ==
Lt. Terrence Sneed, a San Francisco policeman, is summoned to Paloma, New Mexico to help take down a local organized crime syndicate led by kingpin Victor Manso, a respected community leader. Soon after Sneed's arrival, he and Captain Frank Dolek stop a group of gangsters who ambush a courthouse and attempt to flee in a truck, but four officers are killed in the shootout. Later, Sneed visits his former lover, Dr. Nancy Edmondson, but she refuses to revive their relationship and accuses him of corruption. Sneed drives to the home office of Manso and accepts an envelope of cash to act as a middleman between law enforcement and the crime syndicate; Sneed learns that Capt. Dolek is also on the take.

Sometime later, Sneed hooks up with his money launderer Oscar, whom Sneed orders to follow Dolek. Sneed goes to the apartment of suspect Danny James, overpowers him and intimidates him into becoming an informant. Later, James reveals that a drug dealer named Zeno Elliot will be making a delivery to Manso. Sneed and Native American detective John Tallbear break into Elliot's apartment and find cocaine. Back at the station, Dolek tells Sneed that Elliot is to be released from police custody under orders of Manso, but Sneed blackmails Manso by revealing that he's had the captain followed and knows that he's corrupt, as well. When Sneed returns to Manso's office he is beaten up for betraying Dolek, but Manso nevertheless calls Sneed valuable and gives him another cash payment. Manso's henchmen dump Sneed at Nancy's house, where she tends to his wounds.

Sneed and Tallbear raid Manso's mansion while he is attending a ceremony. They have to flee when Manso returns early after suffering a heart attack, but they obtain enough information to put a strike force into operation to intercept the vans Manso uses to transport illegal goods. Sneed leads a stakeout of Manso's front business, a paper company. However, Dolek has informed Manso of the plan. After two decoy vans mislead police, Sneed gives chase to a third van headed for the Mexican border; after it stalls in a river and Sneed fights the driver, Benedetto, Sneed finds the van full of counterfeiting equipment. Benedetto bribes Sneed to minimize his charges, while Capt. Dolek double-crosses Sneed by informing Chief Berrigan about Sneed's corruption. After Sneed collects his take from Benedetto, he is confronted by Chief Berrigan and several officers in a set-up that Manso arranged. While Sneed pleads innocence back at the police station, claiming that the cash was his own (having switched the incriminating notes with Oscar), Benedetto is shot dead by Tallbear, eliminating Berrigan's only witness. Sneed's gun is returned to him and he goes to Manso's estate with several other officers, but Sneed refuses to admit guilt and Manso gives in. Later, Tallbear informs Sneed that the price of Benedetto's murder is "fifty percent of everything." Sneed then reveals that he's been promoted to captain.

== Cast ==
- Billy Dee Williams as Lt. Terrence Sneed
- Eddie Albert as Chief Berrigan
- Frankie Avalon as Danny James
- Sorrell Booke as Oscar
- Tracy Reed as Nancy Edmondson
- Albert Salmi as Capt. Frank Dolek
- Vic Morrow as Victor Manso
- A Martinez as John Tallbear
- James Luisi as Benedetto
- Kathrine Baumann as James' Girl (as Kathy Bauman)
- John Davis Chandler as Man with Braces (as John Chandler)
- Robert Miller Driscoll as Zeno Elliot
- Kathleen Hughes as School Nurse
- William Sargent as Barry Indus
- Vernon Weddle as Vanessi
- Dick Yarmy as Roclair
- Vic Perrin as Radio Announcer (uncredited)

== Production ==
Billy Dee Williams had become famous through his appearances in Brian's Song and Lady Sings the Blues. Director Robert Hartford-Davis had previously made Black Gunn.

The film was an Americanized version of a British novel. Filming took place in the Albuquerque area around August 1973. Producer Stanley Rubin had previously made Man and the City in the area.

Frankie Avalon appeared in a character role as an informant. He later said The Take "wasn't a good film but I think I did a good job."

== Reception ==
Variety noted, "Tame police meller looks more like a vidseries pilot than a theatrical release. Okay of its omnipresent kind."

Gene Siskel of the Chicago Tribune gave the film one-and-a-half stars out of four and wrote, "Is he a crooked cop, or he is just grabbing some extra dough while doing his job? If you can sit thru at least a dozen murders, assorted illegalities by both hoods and police, and the ubiquitous car chase, you will get an answer to the question. But believe me, it isn't worth the wait."

Kevin Thomas of the Los Angeles Times called it "a lively, well-made action film, distinctive largely for its deeply cynical tone ... A film without anyone to root for or care much about is a risky proposition, but so much happens at such a fast clip that 'The Take' is actually quite diverting."

Geoff Brown of The Monthly Film Bulletin declared that there is "no denying that at times The Take positively bristles with pace and professionalism: cars swerve about with tyres and sirens screaming, helicopters swoop, bullets sizzle and bodies fall—all captured with neatly feverish editing and a pounding soundtrack. And the film maintains its momentum in spite of its rather indecipherable story-line."
