= Newt Arnold =

American film director

Newt Arnold (February 22, 1922 – February 12, 2000) was an American filmmaker. Arnold directed Bloodsport, which was released in 1988 and has since become a cult film, as well as several other screen works. Arnold was the two-time recipient of the Directors Guild of America Award for his work as an assistant director of The Godfather Part II and 12 Angry Men.

== Early life ==
Born in Palo Alto, California, Arnold earned a bachelor's degree at Stanford University and postgraduate scholarships in the Banff School of Fine Arts and the University of London. He received a master's degree from University of California, Los Angeles.

== Film ==
In film, Arnold was initially an assistant director particularly in The Ballad of Josie, The Way West, The Devil's Brigade and The Green Berets. Arnold's screen career spanned forty-five years and also included work on television films, miniseries and commercials. For his work as first assistant director of The Godfather Part II he received the Directors Guild of America Award. Arnold received a second Directors Guild of America Award for his work in 12 Angry Men, a remake of the 1957 film with the same title. His directing work on Masada and the miniseries Peter the Great was also praised by critics.

Arnold also directed the films Hands of a Stranger (1962) and Blood Thirst (1971) and directed some additional scenes for the film Allan Quatermain and the Lost City of Gold (1986).

== Death ==
Arnold died of leukemia on February 12, 2000, in his home in Encino, California, at the age 77. He was survived by his wife and two sons.
