= Black Gunn =

1972 blaxploitation film by Robert Hartford-Davis

- US film poster
- Directed by: Robert Hartford-Davis
- Screenplay by: Franklin Coen; Robert Shearer
- Story by: Robert Hartford-Davis
- Produced by: John Heyman; Norman Priggen
- Starring: Jim Brown; Martin Landau; Brenda Sykes; Luciana Paluzzi; Vida Blue
- Cinematography: Richard H. Kline
- Edited by: Pat Somerset
- Music by: Tony Osborne
- Production company: Champion Production Company; World Film Services; Columbia Pictures
- Distributed by: Columbia Pictures
- Release dates: December 1972 (United States); 29 April 1973 (UK)
- Running time: 96 minutes
- Country: United States; United Kingdom
- Language: English
- Box office: $1,015,000 (US/ Canada rentals)

Black Gunn is a 1972 blaxploitation film directed by Robert Hartford-Davis and starring Jim Brown as the title character, a nightclub owner who gets caught up in a conflict between a Black power organization and the American Mafia. The film co-stars Martin Landau, Brenda Sykes, Luciana Paluzzi, and baseball pitcher-turned-actor Vida Blue in his sole film role.

The film differs from many blaxploitation films in that it was an international co-production (between Columbia Pictures and British producer John Heyman), and was made by a non-American director. It premiered in the United States on December 20, 1972.

== Plot ==
In Los Angeles, a nighttime robbery of an illegal mafia bookmaking operation is carried out by the militant African-American organization BAG (Black Action Group). Though successful, several of the bookmakers and one of the burglars are killed. The mastermind behind the robbery, a Vietnam veteran named Scott, is the brother of a prominent nightclub owner, Gunn. Seeking safe haven, Scott hides out at his brother's mansion after a brief reunion.

Meanwhile, mafia capo Russ Capelli meets with a female West Coast boss, Toni Lombardo, to report the theft of daily payoff records and monies. Though Capelli receives an unrelated promotion for years of loyal service, he nonetheless fears the consequences of a loss of face and status as well as incriminating mob financial information. He therefore orders his men, led by psychotic assassin Ray Kriley, to shake down anyone who might have a connection to the robbery and to recover the lost goods using any means necessary.

== Cast ==
- Jim Brown as Gunn
- Martin Landau as Capelli
- Brenda Sykes as Judith
- Herbert Jefferson Jr. as Scott Gunn
- Luciana Paluzzi as Toni
- Vida Blue as Sam Green
- Stephen McNally as Laurento
- Keefe Brasselle as Winman
- Timothy Brown as Larry
- William Campbell as Rico
- Bruce Glover as Ray Kriley
- Bernie Casey as Seth
- Gary Conway as Adams
- Chuck Daniel as Mel
- Tommy Davis as Webb
- Rick Ferrell as Jim "Jimpy"
- Toni Holt Kramer as Betty
- Mark Tapscott as Cassidy
- Gene Washington as Elmo
- Julian Christopher as Lieutenant Hopper
- Don Borisenko as Val
- Tony Young as Dell
- Katherine Woodville as Louella
- Gyl Roland as Celeste
- Lavelle Roby as Jane
- Jeannie Bell as Lisa
- Tony Giorgio as Ben
- Frank Bello as Rob "Robbo"
- Deacon Jones as Himself

=== Casting notes ===
Jim Brown, Vida Blue, and Bernie Casey were all former professional athletes. Brown was a star running back in the NFL, Blue was a six-time MLB All-Star pitcher, and Casey was an NFL wide-receiver.

== Production ==
Veteran British B-movie director Robert Hartford-Davis originally conceived of the film as set in the London underworld and Black power scene. Producer John Heyman retooled it to an American setting, so the film could better fit the blaxploitation trend.

Filming took place in Los Angeles. Jim Brown had an affair with Brenda Sykes during production.

Hartford-Davis and Heyman made another blaxploitation film, The Take, in 1974.

== Release ==
The film was released theatrically in the United States by Columbia Pictures in December 1972.

=== Home media ===
The film was given a VHS release by GoodTimes Entertainment in the United States. It was later released on DVD in 2004 via Sony Pictures Home Entertainment. A Blu-ray, on a double bill with The Take, was released by Mill Creek Entertainment in 2019.

== Reception ==
Contemporaneously, A. H. Weiler for The New York Times gave the film a mixed review, writing "despite the occasional rationalizations of Jim Brown, its tough titular star and others, Black Gunn ultimately is no more constructive sociologically than its frequent fireworks and bloodletting."

In a retrospective review, Steve Aldous wrote "it is a fast-paced, but unevenly handled, action vehicle for Brown.... Brown is a physically effective lead but otherwise, his performance lacks charisma. Sykes brings some charm to her role as Brown’s loyal girlfriend. Landau and Paluzzi (as key mob members) are underused in a strong supporting cast. Glover, however, enjoys himself as the mob’s chief henchman."

The film was enough of a commercial success that producer John Heyman considered a sequel, though one was never produced.

Quentin Tarantino has said the experience of watching Black Gunn (on a double-bill with The Bus Is Coming) in a grindhouse theatre as a child is what inspired by him to become a filmmaker.

== See also ==
- List of American films of 1972
- List of British films of 1972
