= Don't Lose Your Head =

1967 British comedy film by Gerald Thomas

- Original UK quad poster by Renato Fratini
- Directed by: Gerald Thomas
- Written by: Talbot Rothwell
- Produced by: Peter Rogers
- Starring: Sidney James; Kenneth Williams; Jim Dale; Charles Hawtrey; Joan Sims; Dany Robin
- Cinematography: Alan Hume
- Edited by: Rod Keys
- Music by: Eric Rogers
- Distributed by: Rank Organisation
- Release date: 2 March 1967
- Running time: 86 mins
- Country: United Kingdom
- Language: English
- Budget: £215,152

Don't Lose Your Head is a 1967 British swashbuckling comedy film, the 13th in the series of 31 Carry On films (1958–1992). Set in France and England in 1789 during the French Revolution, it is a parody of Baroness Orczy's The Scarlet Pimpernel. Of the series' regular cast, it features Sid James, Kenneth Williams, Jim Dale, Charles Hawtrey, and Joan Sims. French actress Dany Robin makes her only Carry On appearance.

The first Carry On to be produced by the Rank Organisation, Don't Lose Your Head was not conceived as a part of the series and was first released without the Carry On prefix. However, the ongoing popularity of the series persuaded Rank to add the prefix to the titles of this and the following film, Follow That Camel, when they were re-released.

== Plot ==
It is the time of the French Revolution. The French aristocracy are losing their heads (literally) and two English noblemen, who play at appearing foppish, Sir Rodney Ffing (pronounced "Effing") and his best friend Lord Darcy Pue, bored with the endless rounds of country pursuits, decide to have some fun and save their French counterparts from being guillotined.

The enraged and incompetent revolutionary leader, Citizen Camembert, and his lackey, Citizen Bidet, scour France for the elusive saviour of the nobles, who is nicknamed “The Black Fingernail” after his calling card of “two digits rampant”. After a series of audacious rescues, the Fingernail, disguised as an insurance salesman, succeeds in rescuing the Duc de Pommfrit and in the process tricks Camembert into guillotining his own executioner. Camembert is chastised by his superior Maximillien Robespierre and threatened with the guillotine, unless he captures the Fingernail.

During his escape from France, Sir Rodney meets his true love, Jacqueline, leaving her with a silver locket containing a set of his mother's false teeth. When they become aware of Jacqueline, Camembert and Bidet imprison her. Using the locket as a trap and disguised as the Comte and Comtesse de la Plume de ma Tante, they travel to England to uncover the real identity of The Black Fingernail. They are accompanied by Camembert's lover, Desirée, who wears the locket and pretends to be Camembert's flamboyant sister. She is on the prowl, looking to marry a man with a title.

After a series of intrigues at a ball at Ffing House, everyone's identity is revealed. Sir Rodney challenges Camembert to a rigged duel in order to get a head start on his journey to Paris to rescue Jacqueline. Desirée is now in love with the hero, and will do all she can to save him from the guillotine in return for his promise that she will indeed marry a man with a title.

On arrival in Paris, the Fingernail discovers that Jacqueline has been moved from the Bastille to the Château Neuf. This is the former home of a recently executed member of the aristocracy who was an avid art collector. Camembert has awarded this home to himself.

Ffing, Lord Darcy, and the Duc de Pommfrit travel to the Château Neuf to rescue Jacqueline. During the ensuing swordfight with French soldiers, most of the art collection is destroyed. With Desirée's help, Jacqueline is rescued. All five flee to safety as the château collapses, in spite of Camembert's and Bidet's attempt to prevent it.

For their incompetence, Robespierre orders the execution of Camembert and Bidet on a double guillotine. They are relieved to know that the Fingernail is not there to see it, until the executioner reveals that he is The Black Fingernail himself. Afterwards, in England, Ffing marries Jacqueline, who becomes Lady Ffing, and he keeps his promise to Desirée, who has married the Duc de Pommfrit (a man with a title), although he is not the man she had in mind.

== Cast ==
- Sid James as Sir Rodney Ffing/The Black Fingernail
- Kenneth Williams as Citizen Camembert
- Jim Dale as Lord Darcy Pue
- Charles Hawtrey as Duc de Pommfrit
- Joan Sims as Desiree Dubarry
- Peter Butterworth as Citizen Bidet
- Dany Robin as Jacqueline
- Peter Gilmore as Maximilien Robespierre
- Marianne Stone as Landlady
- Michael Ward as Henri
- Leon Greene as Malabonce
- Richard Shaw as Captain
- David Davenport as Sergeant
- Jennifer Clulow as 1st lady
- Valerie Van Ost as 2nd lady
- Jacqueline Pearce as 3rd lady
- Hugh Futcher as Guard (uncredited)
- Nikki van der Zyl as Messenger (uncredited)
- Julian Orchard as Rake (uncredited)
- Elspeth March as Lady Binder (uncredited)
- Joan Ingram as Bald dowager (uncredited)
- Michael Nightingale as "What locket?" man (uncredited)
- Diana MacNamara as Princess Stephanie (uncredited)
- Ronnie Brody as Little man (uncredited)
- Billy Cornelius as Soldier (uncredited)
- Patrick Allen as Narrator (uncredited)
- Monica Dietrich as Girl (uncredited)
- Anna Willoughby as Girl (uncredited)
- Penny Keen as Girl (uncredited)
- June Cooper as Girl (uncredited)
- Christine Pryor as Girl (uncredited)
- Karen Young as Girl (uncredited)

== Filming and locations ==
- Filming dates – 12 September–28 October 1966

Interiors:

- Marble Hall, Clandon House, Guildford, Surrey, England
- Pinewood Studios, Buckinghamshire

Exteriors:

- Clandon House, Guildford, Surrey, England
- Claydon Park, Claydon, Buckinghamshire, England
- Cliveden, Buckinghamshire, England, UK
- Waddesdon Manor, Waddesdon, Buckinghamshire, England, UK
- Black Park, Buckinghamshire, England, UK

== Bibliography ==
- Bright, Morris; Ross, Robert (2000). Mr Carry On – The Life & Work of Peter Rogers. London: BBC Books. ISBN 978-0563551836.
- Davidson, Andy (2012). Carry On Confidential. London: Miwk. ISBN 978-1908630018.
- Eastaugh, Kenneth (1978). The Carry On Book. London: David & Charles. ISBN 978-0715374030.
- Hibbin, Sally & Nina (1988). What a Carry On. London: Hamlyn. ISBN 978-0600558194.
- Hudis, Norman (2008). No Laughing Matter. London: Apex. ISBN 978-1906358150.
- Rigelsford, Adrian (1996). Carry On Laughing – a celebration. London: Virgin. ISBN 1-85227-554-5.
- Ross, Robert (2002). The Carry On Companion. London: Batsford. ISBN 978-0713487718.
- Sheridan, Simon (2007). Keeping the British End Up – Four Decades of Saucy Cinema (third ed.). Reynolds & Hearn Books.
- Sheridan, Simon (2011). Keeping the British End Up – Four Decades of Saucy Cinema. London: Titan Books. ISBN 978-0857682796.
- Webber, Richard (2009). 50 Years of Carry On. London: Arrow. ISBN 978-0099490074.
