= Carlo Krahmer =

British musician (1914–1976)

- Birth name: William Max Geserick
- Born: 11 March 1914; Shoreditch, London, England
- Died: 20 April 1976 (aged 62); London, England
- Genres: Jazz
- Occupation: Musician
- Instrument(s): Jazz Drummer; Record Producer; Band Leader
- Years active: 1939-1976

Carlo Krahmer (born William Max Geserick, 11 March 1914, Shoreditch, London – 20 April 1976, London) was a British jazz drummer and record producer.

== Biography ==
Born in Shoreditch, London, Krahmer was partially sighted. He made has first record in 1939 and in the early 40s made recordings with Johnny Claes’s (1916-1956) band. He later joined Claude Bampton's Blind Orchestra, a body sponsored by the National Institute for the Blind (now the RNIB), of which George Shearing was also a member. He worked in various bands, sometimes as leader, taking his own group to the Paris Jazz Festival in 1949.

In 1947, Krahmer co-founded Esquire Records with Peter Newbrook, a label which recorded bebop and licensed recordings from American blues and jazz labels. By 1950, Krahmer had retired from active performance, but had begun to teach aspiring drummers such as Victor Feldman.

Krahmer died in London in April 1976. After his death, Esquire Records was run by his widow Greta.
