= Blood Thirst =

1971 film by Newt Arnold

- DVD cover
- Directed by: Newt Arnold
- Written by: N.I.P. Dennis
- Produced by: Newt Arnold
- Starring: Yvonne Nielson; Robert Winston; Judy Dennis; Vic Diaz
- Cinematography: Hermo Santos
- Edited by: Cielito Santillan
- Release date: 1971
- Running time: 74 minutes
- Countries: United States; Philippines
- Language: English

Blood Thirst (also known as Blood Seekers) is a 1971 Filipino-American black-and-white horror film produced and directed by Newt Arnold, and starring Robert Winston, Katherine Henryk and Yvonne Nielson. Shot on location in the Philippines in 1965, the film tells the story of an American detective investigating a series of murders linked to a Manila nightclub. The killings are carried out by a monster so that a beautiful blonde woman, who is actually hundreds of years old, can use the victim's blood to stay forever young.

Blood Thirst was actually completed in 1965 but was not released in the US until 1971, where it was put on a double bill with the British film Bloodsuckers (UK, 1971). Blood Thirst mostly played the grindhouse circuit.

== Plot ==
New York City detective and sex-crimes specialist Adam Rourke has gone to Manila to help his friend, Inspector Miguel Ramos, investigate the murders of several young women. All have had their blood drained through identical 10 cm incisions on the inside of each forearm. Miguel suspects a homicidal maniac but has heard rumours that a "strange blood cult" is to blame. Adam goes undercover as a writer seeking the story of the latest victim, Maria Cortez, a hostess at the Barrio Club, owned by Mr. Calderone.

Adam goes to the club. He brushes off a pretty hostess, Theresa, and instead watches beautiful blonde Serena dance. He and Calderone discuss the article about Maria.

That night, Adam kills a man who attacked him in his hotel room. Afterwards, he is stopped by a seemingly homeless man who in reality is Herrera, an undercover officer with a prosthetic leg who is Adam's police liaison.

Sylvia, Miguel's adopted sister, drives Adam into the countryside and dumps him there, accusing him of not taking the case seriously. As he walks to his hotel, he sees a drunken Theresa arrive home. Out of sight of Adam, she is jumped by a humanoid monster. At the club, Serena suddenly clutches her face and runs off the dance floor. She looks older than she had earlier.

Miguel contacts the police in Lima and learns that Calderone and Serena fled Peru two years earlier, after Calderone was implicated in the murders of several young women. Elena, another club hostess, is then kidnapped by the monster.

Adam is unaware of the monster but suspects that Calderone is the murderer. Serena disingenuously tells Adam that Calderone "is a maniac and he'll kill to protect his secret." She introduces Adam to Louisa, a new hostess. Louisa is actually Sylvia. She has fallen in love with Adam and wants to help him. She points out that Serena's wrist-to-elbow armbands are of Aztec or Inca origin.

The monster kills Elena in a secret chamber beneath the Barrio Club. He moves a bowl of her blood in front of Sylvia, who is seated in a chair with a brightly lit box behind her head. She throws powder into the blood. Smoke rises and when it clears Serena is young again.

Serena asks Adam to her home and tells him lies. She says that Calderone killed his wife and made it look like suicide, and that he forces her to dance at the club. Adam passes out from the drugged drink that Serena gave him. As this happens, Sylvia discovers the secret chamber and is grabbed by the monster.

Adam awakens tied to a tree. Serena explains that she was chosen "by her people" to become one of the "golden goddesses" but she must have the blood of other women to maintain her eternal beauty. The blood is mixed with the powdered roots of ancient trees and the "electrical energy of the sun harnessed in a small container." Serena removes an armband to show Adam her scar, identical to those of the murder victims. But just as she is about to stab Adam, she begins ageing rapidly and runs for the chamber.

Adam is freed by one of Calderone's men and calls the police. Adam takes Miguel to the chamber, where the monster is about to kill Sylvia. Instead, he attacks the men, inadvertently moving the bowl of Elena's blood in front of Serena. Miguel shoots the monster four times to little effect. The monster begins strangling both men, but Herrera hits him with his artificial leg. The monster falls and strikes his head. Adam and Miguel save Sylvia.

Serena throws powder into Elena's blood. When the smoke clears, she is a very old woman. She throws another handful and after the smoke dissipates only her clothing and armbands remain. The monster dies, revealing himself to be Calderone.

The case solved, Adam kisses Sylvia good-bye and heads home to New York.

== Cast ==
- Robert Winston as Adam Rourke
- Katherine Henryk as Sylvia Ramos
- Yvonne Nielson as Serena Brioso
- Vic Diaz as Inspector Miguel Ramos
- Vic Silayan as Calderone
- Eddie Infante as Herrera
- Bruno Punzalan as Moreno
- Judy Dennis as Theresa
- Max Roio as Max (credited as Max Rojo)
- Ching Tello
- Minda Morena
- Isidro Francisco
- Felix Marfil

== Production ==
The film was shot on location by Journey Productions Inc. in the Philippines in 1965 but not distributed to theatres in the US until 1971.

Blood Thirst was given a GP rating by the Motion Picture Association of America (MPAA) upon its release. GP meant that parental guidance was suggested, but not required, which allowed the film to be exhibited to audiences of all ages.

== Release ==
Chevron Pictures distributed Blood Thirst as the second feature on a double-bill with what film critic and psychometrist Bryan Senn considers to be the inferior British horror film Bloodsuckers (titled Incense for the Damned in the UK). He notes that "by 1965, producing a black-and-white picture, much less an import with no star names, was asking for distribution trouble, and the film sat on the shelf for half-a-dozen years before Chevron decided they needed a co-feature for their British snoozer Blood Suckers."

The US poster for the films carries a warning which reads "Notice: We are not responsible for your nightmares when you see this blood-curdling gruesome twosome!"

=== Home media ===
Blood Thirst was released on DVD by Image Entertainment on July 24, 2001, as a double-feature alongside Blood Suckers (1989). Image later re-released the film on September 2, 2003, as a part of its three-disk "Box of Blood" movie pack. The film was later released by Alpha Video on March 23, 2004. On August 2, 2005, it was released by Diamond Entertainment as a part of its two-disk "Vampire Collection". It was later released on August 5, 2008, by Retromedia in its "Morella's Blood Vision" movie pack. The film was last released by Cav Distributing Corporation on September 10, 2013, as a part of a "Drive-In Collection".

== Reception ==
Theatrical reviewers praised the 'look' of Blood Thirst. Senn writes that "The film's stark black-and-white photography takes an atmospheric turn from the outset, particularly during the nighttime shots of the shadow-filled, deserted streets, the planes of light and darkness becoming almost noirish in their intensity." Similarly, internet critic Mdeapo says that "Visually, this film is framed in an artful manner and the black-and-white photography is crisp, adding atmosphere and shadow." And critic David Elroy Goldweber describes Blood Thirst as having "unusually good staging of shots and black-and-white cinematography. The lighting, the framing, the subtle camera work is very sophisticated for films of this kind."

The same critics are relatively gentle with the film as a whole. Blood Thirst is "an uneven but entertaining mishmash of film noir, Filipino horror, and seedy spy flick," a "watchable and brief drive-in number that would be a perfect second bill to The Awful Dr. Orloff or Nightmare Castle (...) humorous and exotic enough to keep your interest on a dark and rainy night" and a picture that "might work without sound as a background movie during a party."

However, critics found the film's monster to be somewhat laughable. One writes that "the creature looks like the Michelin Man after stepping on a hornets' nest," while another describes him/it as having "a face like a melting marshmallow."

Mondo Digital calls it "a moody, gothic blend of police procedural and sadistic horror, with the latter finally taking over completely the lively final ten minutes." David Cornelius from DVD Talk panned the film, criticizing the film's acting, dialogue, and nonsensical plot. Eric Cotenas from DVD Drive-In gives the film a mixed review, commending the film's interesting monster, Nielson's performance, and monochrome cinematography, but also stating that the film is "mostly a snooze."

Fred Beldin from Allmovie gives the film a positive review, commending the film's set pieces, quick pacing, and Winston's performance, writing that "Blood Thirst is an entertaining horror/mystery tale with a twist on the standard legends that vampire fans might be expecting." On his website Fantastic Movie Musings and Ramblings, Dave Sindelar indicates that he likes the film, while noting its plot is occasionally clunky and shows obvious cheapness.

The Telltale Mind referred to the film as a "strange hybrid of a film that mixes classic noir with horror and surprisingly, does a pretty good job of it." and MonsterHunter called the plot absurd and reviewed the films obscure nature positively.

== See also ==
- List of American films of 1965
