= The Story of Esther Costello =

1957 film by David Miller

- Original theatrical poster
- Directed by: David Miller
- Written by: Charles Kaufman
- Based on: The Story of Esther Costello; 1952 novel by Nicholas Monsarrat
- Produced by: Jack Clayton; David Miller
- Starring: Joan Crawford; Rossano Brazzi; Heather Sears
- Cinematography: Robert Krasker
- Edited by: Ralph Kemplen
- Music by: Lambert Williamson
- Production company: Romulus Films
- Distributed by: Columbia Pictures
- Release date: 6 November 1957
- Running time: 127 minutes
- Country: United Kingdom
- Language: English
- Box office: $1,075,000 (US rentals)

The Story of Esther Costello is a 1957 British drama film directed by David Miller and starring Joan Crawford, Rossano Brazzi and Heather Sears. It was produced by Miller and Jack Clayton. The screenplay by Charles Kaufman was based on the 1952 novel by Nicholas Monsarrat. It was distributed by Columbia Pictures. The film is a story of large-scale fundraising.

== Plot ==
With her marriage to womaniser Carlo Landi in ashes, wealthy and childless Margaret Landi finds an emotional outlet in educating a 15-year-old deaf, mute, and blind Irish girl named Esther Costello. Esther's disabilities are the result of a childhood trauma and are psychosomatic rather than physical. As Costello makes progress with Braille and sign language, she is seen as an example of triumph over adversity. Carlo gets wind of Margaret's new life and re-enters the scene. He views Esther as a source of cheap financial gain and arranges a series of exploitative tours for her under mercenary manager, Frank Wenzel. One day when Margaret is absent from the Landi apartment, Carlo rapes the now 16-year-old Esther. The shock restores the girl's sight and hearing. When Margaret learns of her husband's business duplicities and the rape, she consigns Esther to the care of a priest and a young reporter who loves her. Margaret and Carlo drive off, but Margaret has a gun and we are led to believe she kills Carlo and herself.

== Cast ==
- Joan Crawford as Margaret Landi
- Rossano Brazzi as Carlo Landi
- Heather Sears as Esther Costello
- Lee Patterson as Harry Grant
- Ron Randell as Frank Wenzel
- Fay Compton as Mother Superior
- John Loder as Paul Marchant
- Denis O'Dea as Father Devlin
- Sidney James as Ryan
- Bessie Love as Matron in Art Gallery
- Robert Ayres as Mr Wilson
- Sally Smith as Susan North
- Maureen Delaney as Jennie Costello
- Harry Hutchinson as Irish publican
- Tony Quinn as Irish pub customer
- Janina Faye as Esther Costello, as a child
- Victor Rietti as Signor Gatti
- Megs Jenkins as Nurse Evans
- Andrew Cruickshank as Dr Stein
- Wilfred Brambell as man in pub (uncredited)

== Production notes ==
The film is based on a book by Nicholas Monsarrat that nearly had Helen Keller's co-workers suing for libel due to perceived parallels between Helen's story and Esther's. In particular, the book seemed to slur the character of Anne Sullivan's husband, writer-publicist John Macy, who was close to Keller's age. A relationship between Macy and Keller has long been a subject of speculation. Esther's reporter friend was reminiscent of Keller's highly publicised attempt to elope with reporter-secretary Peter Fagan.

Heather Sears was under contract to the Woolf brothers.

A key support role went to Ron Randell, who had been in the Woolf brothers' I am a Camera.

== Reception ==
=== Box office ===
The film was the 11th most popular film at the British box office in 1957.

According to Kinematograph Weekly the film was "in the money" at the British box office in 1957 and was a "tremendous money spinner".

=== Critical ===
The Monthly Film Bulletin wrote: "The fascinations of mass hypnosis, at the huge Esther Costello rallies in America, are suavely indulged by David Miller's luxuriating direction. Indeed, this scene – very reminiscent of the Communist rally in Trial – hits the only true note to be found in this florid Crawford vehicle."

The New York Times noted, "Miss Crawford, Mr. Brazzi, and Mr. Patterson and all the minor players are professional throughout."

William K. Zinsser in the New York Herald Tribune wrote, "It wouldn't be a Joan Crawford picture without plenty of anguish...And her fans will have their usual good time...this plot enables Miss Crawford to run a full-course dinner of dramatic moods, from loneliness to mother love, from pride in the girl to passion with her husband, and finally to smouldering rage...Somehow she pulls it off. This may not be your kind of movie but it is many women's kind of movie and our Joan is queen of the art form."

== DVD ==
The Story of Esther Costello was released on DVD by Turner Classics (under licence from Sony Pictures Home Entertainment) on 25 November 2014, as part of the "Joan Crawford in the 1950s" collection.

== See also ==
- List of American films of 1957
- List of films featuring the deaf and hard of hearing
