= Corruption (1968 film) =

1968 British film by Robert Hartford-Davis

- Theatrical release poster
- Directed by: Robert Hartford-Davis
- Written by: Derek Ford; Donald Ford
- Produced by: Peter Newbrook
- Starring: Peter Cushing; Sue Lloyd
- Cinematography: Peter Newbrook
- Edited by: Don Deacon
- Music by: Bill McGuffie
- Production company: Oakshire Productions
- Distributed by: Columbia Pictures
- Release dates: December 1968 (U.K.); 4 December 1968 (U.S.)
- Running time: 91 minutes
- Country: United Kingdom
- Language: English

Corruption is a 1968 British horror film directed by Robert Hartford-Davis and starring Peter Cushing, Sue Lloyd, Noel Trevarthen, Kate O'Mara, David Lodge, and Antony Booth. The screenplay is by Derek Ford and Donald Ford.

The film is a loose riff on the plot of the French horror film Eyes Without a Face (1960) and is notable for its atypical contemporary setting (most of Cushing's Gothic horror films being set in the past) and its extreme (for the time) gore and violence.

== Plot ==
Sir John Rowan is a prominent plastic surgeon with a beautiful and youthful fiancée named Lynn, who works as a fashion model. At a raucous party, Rowan – much older than any of the other attendees, and clearly uncomfortable around the countercultural excess of the late 1960s – gets into a physical altercation with a sleazy photographer, and during the scuffle, a hot lamp falls on Lynn, severely scarring her face. Rowan pledges to reverse Lynn's disfigurement, experimenting with laser technology to revive her skin and eventually coming up with a cure-all: a Frankensteinian transplant of pituitary glands. Driven by a combination of guilt and love, Rowan goes on a murder spree, killing young women in order to use their pituitary glands to restore his fiancée's beauty. The procedure is successful, and the couple go on holiday to a seaside cottage, where all is fine for now, but they know that her face will soon start to show signs of deterioration.

In need of more surgery and a new "donor", the couple tries to entice a young girl Terry whom Rowan contrives to meet at the beach and take back to their cottage. Complications ensue because Rowan does not want to commit another murder and because this girl is not what she seems to be. In fact, she is part of a gang of robbers who break into the house and hold Rowan and Lynn hostage. Soon they discover evidence of the murders and begin to menace the couple. After a short confrontation, everyone is killed when Rowan's surgical laser goes out of control.

The ending of the film is ambiguous. One possible interpretation is that everything from the disfigurement onward was a dream experienced by Rowan – either at the party or just prior to the party.

== Cast ==
- Peter Cushing as Sir John Rowan
- Sue Lloyd as Lynn Nolan
- Noel Trevarthen as Steve Harris
- Kate O'Mara as Val Nolan
- David Lodge as Groper
- Anthony Booth as Mike Orme
- Wendy Varnals as Terry
- Billy Murray as Rik
- Vanessa Howard as Kate
- Jan Waters as Girl In The Flat (U.K. / U.S. version)
- Marianne Morris as Girl In The Flat (Continental version)
- Phillip Manikum as Georgie
- Alexandra Dane as Sandy
- Valerie Van Ost as Girl On The Yrain

== Production ==
The film was shot at Isleworth Studios, and on location at Hope Gap Beach in Seaford, East Sussex.

Due to the strong graphic content of the film, different markets around the world received different versions of key scenes, most notably the murder of a prostitute who appears topless in some markets (Scandinavia, South America, and East Asia), but is clothed in the version which played in the U.K. and U.S. The two versions feature different actresses in the role as well as different dialogue.

Cushing later said "It was gratuitously violent, fearfully sick. But it was a good script, which just goes to show how important the presentation is. The company that made the film split up halfway through as certain individuals could not agree on what should and should not appear in the final print. What you saw was the final result of their bickering. Audiences did not get the idea that it was supposed to be based on a dream, which in fact did not justify some of the scenes that were presented. With any film you participate in, the company, if they so wish, can destroy your original interpretation of the role."

== Critical reception ==
The film was negatively received at the time of its release; Vincent Canby of The New York Times noted that "Peter Cushing ... brings a certain seedy grandeur to the role," but dismissed the film as "silly," particularly due to the contemporary setting. A review in Variety called it a "Fair horror picture ... [that] suffers from poor writing, plus often sluggish direction."

The Monthly Film Bulletin wrote: "The classicism of the plot is nowhere reflected in Robert Hartford-Davis' direction, which finds its inspiration in such divergent sources as Blow-Up and The Penthouse. Murders and surgical operations are shown in lingering detail (with an anamorphic squeeze to establish atmosphere), and the elements of suspense and horror derive not from any subtly created mood or logical sequence of monstrosities but from the bludgeoning emphasis on physically unpleasant details, like the severed head kept in the refrigerator in a polythene bag next to the butter."

The film has been better received in recent years as a cult film, sometimes enjoyed for its camp value. Brian Orndorf of Blu-ray.com wrote in his 2013 review: "This 1968 film is set during the Swinging London period of gaudy liberation, where colors exploded, hair was uncomfortably cut, and free love was rampant. The image of Cushing, with his gentlemanly manner and impeccable style, is a potent one in the midst of all the youthful madness, with the opening of the effort traveling to a boisterous party where John is cornered by a picky hippie while Lynn's photographer guru goads her into nude shots. Corruption quickly moves away from the freak-out showdown, but its period fashion sense remains, lending the movie a distinct look that's almost as entertaining to study as the murder spree ... Corruption finds a pitch of cinematic madness and holds there for most of the picture, remaining taut, with a pinch of sleaze for seasoning."

Critic Paul Chambers wrote: "Silly, but entertaining. That’s the best way to describe Corruption, the story of a wealthy surgeon during the swinging 1960s who would do anything to keep his young girlfriend happy ... Corruption is a hoot. It was made in the late 1960s and authentically depicts London’s free love and hip culture that was later lampooned in the Austin Powers comedies. Only this film was intended to be a serious horror flick and the costumes and sets are all that more enjoyable because ... well, just because. Peter Cushing is over-the-top crazy in this grindhouse-style goreathon. It’s hard to imagine the filmmakers didn’t know the end product would be campy. But, that makes little difference to today’s audience. I see Corruption as a time capsule, of sorts."

Critic John Beifuss wrote: "Probably the imperfect jewel of British director Robert Hartford-Davis's oddball filmography...Corruption had been perhaps the rarest of horror superstar Peter Cushing's many, many genre movies until the October appearance of this beautifully remastered and restored edition from Grindhouse Releasing, a company that exceeds even the Criterion Collection in its determination to create the definitive editions of the titles it licenses ... A truly wacked-out work of art."

== See also ==
- List of films featuring home invasions
