= Stranger in the City (1961 film) =

1961 film

- Opening titles
- Directed by: Robert Hartford-Davis
- Written by: Robert Hartford-Davis
- Produced by: Robert Hartford-Davis; Julius Robinson
- Starring: Sydney Bromley; Jimmy Charters; Arthur Howell; Robert Vossler
- Cinematography: Roy Pointer
- Edited by: Derek York
- Music by: Steve Race and his Orchestra
- Production company: Caesar Films
- Release date: 1961
- Running time: 22 minutes
- Country: United Kingdom
- Language: English

Stranger in the City is a 1961 British short documentary film directed and written by Robert Hartford-Davis. The film has a music score but no dialogue. It is notable for its contemporary views of London including the Soho music venue The 2i's Coffee Bar.

== Plot ==
The film depicts selected unrelated events as a London day progresses. In early morning three tramps awake and eat breakfast; a wealthy businessman phones from his Rolls Royce as his chauffeur drives through the city; a chef prepares breakfast; an acting class is underway; a fire-eating street entertainer amuses the crowd; striptease at The Keyhole Club; a life-drawing class in a cafe; a visit to the 2i's Coffee Bar; police radio cars are on the streets; the tramps retire.

== Cast ==
- Sydney Bromley as first tramp (uncredited)
- Jimmy Charters as second tramp (uncredited)
- Arthur Howell as police patrol car driver (uncredited)
- Robert Vossler as police patrol car driver (uncredited)

== Critical reception ==
The Monthly Film Bulletin wrote: "A day in London is depicted in a mixture of (badly) acted and unposed scenes. Though the everyday life of the capital's millions is scarcely touched upon, the ground covered is familiar to filmgoers, perhaps most of all the supposedly "off-beat" material – pick-up girls, a strip-club. Only a practice class at an acting school and a study in tramps' table manners are even momentarily striking."

Kine Weekly wrote: "An unusual look at aspects of London life during one day. The film is without commentary, with music creating the necessary 'atmosphere' for various situations; some pathetic, some amusing and some suggestive. Fair."
