= John Heyman =

British film and TV producer (1933–2017)

- Born: 27 April 1933; Leipzig, Germany
- Died: 9 June 2017 (aged 84); New York City, US
- Occupation: Producer
- Years active: 1963–2017
- Spouse(s): Norma Pownall (m. 1960; divorced) Nizza Heyman (m. 1982)
- Children: 5, including David Heyman

John Heyman (27 April 1933 – 9 June 2017) was a British film and TV producer also involved in television production, consulting, and film financing.

== Early life and family ==
Heyman was born in Leipzig to German-Jewish parents. His father, an economist and broadcaster who opposed Hitler, fled Germany on 30 January 1933. The seven-month-old John and his mother joined him that November in London, where his father had secured work as a journalist on the now defunct News Chronicle. During World War II, his father worked for the Ministry of Information and was naturalised British in the national interest. After the war he was the financial correspondent for The Economist, The Times, and Neue Zürcher Zeitung. He died at his typewriter putting the final 'full stop' on a leader column for the Times, which was published two days after his death. John's mother, an avid suffragette, was both a teacher of Russian studies and a permanent student, collecting her seventh degree (in Economics) from the London School of Economics at the age of 70.

== Education and early career ==
Heyman was educated at Norfolk House in London, Wycliffe College in Gloucestershire, and finally at St. Edmund Hall, Oxford.

After two years of National Service in the Army, Heyman returned to Oxford to read law. During a summer vacation, he obtained free tickets to a Radio Luxembourg show. Having been chosen as a contestant he won £93, more money than he thought existed in the world, and he returned to Oxford as the question writer for the show Double Your Money, which would run in the top ten for thirteen years on the new Independent Television Network in England. He also sold a number of other television concepts. In 1955 Heyman started full-time work in the entertainment industry and by the age of 22 was head of public relations at Associated Television, one of the two founder companies of the ITV. By then he was working on five of the network's television programmes, three of which were rated among ITV's top ten.

In 1959 Heyman formed The International Artists Agency, which represented, among others, Elizabeth Taylor, Richard Burton, Richard Harris, Laurence Harvey, Trevor Howard, Shirley Bassey, and Burt Bacharach.

In 1961 the agency formed the subsidiary World Film Sales, the first company to pre-sell and license pictures on a territory-by-territory basis. World Film Sales was sold to ITC in 1973. It was the first of a series of companies which would become the World Group of Companies Limited. For over 40 years, the company and its executives have been producers, packagers, co-financiers, investors, or distributors of films that have garnered numerous awards, including more than 150 Academy Award nominations and more than two dozen Oscars.

== Career ==
In 1963, Heyman started to work as a film producer and had over his lifetime produced some 15 films, among them The Go-Between and The Hireling, which both won the Grand Prix at the Cannes Film Festival. He co-financed a further 150 films. In 1964 he also co-produced the longest running Hamlet in Broadway history, starring Richard Burton and directed by John Gielgud. In 1965 Heyman produced Oh Dad, Poor Dad, Mamma's Hung You in the Closet and I'm Feelin' So Sad, starring Hermione Gingold in London's West End.

In 1973, he founded The Genesis Project to create an audio-visual encyclopaedia, atlas, and dictionary. It commenced translating the Bible onto film accompanied by a variety of educational materials. After completing the filming of Genesis and the Gospel of Luke (which, under the title Jesus, became the most viewed film in history), The New Media Bible was sold to an evangelical organisation, having failed commercially in the age before VHS or DVD.

In the early 1970s, Heyman began to render financial services to major film studios, and is widely credited with creating "structured financing" in the film industry. As a result of his efforts, some $4 billion has been provided to co-finance more than 150 films and television programs, including Awakenings (Columbia), Black Rain (Paramount), Chinatown (Paramount), Edward Scissorhands (Fox), Grease (Paramount), Greystoke: The Legend of Tarzan (Warner), Heaven Can Wait (Paramount), Home Alone (Fox), Looking For Mr Goodbar (Paramount), The Man Who Would Be King (Allied Artists), Marathon Man (Paramount), The Odessa File (Columbia), The Rocky Horror Picture Show (Fox), Saturday Night Fever (Paramount), Star Trek: The Motion Picture (Paramount), Trail of the Pink Panther (MGM), and Victor/Victoria (MGM).

In 1990 Heyman co-founded Island World, which produced and licensed film and television programs, including The Cure (Universal), Eddie (Disney), Juice (Paramount), The Sandlot (Fox), Toy Soldiers (Tri-Star), Airheads (Fox), and The War (Universal). Island World was sold to PolyGram at the end of 1994, but Heyman retained control of the London television production company World Productions Limited. It became an active provider of British television programming in partnership with Tony Garnett, and was the only company to have had programs airing on all five UK terrestrial channels in the same year. The company received a special award from the British Academy of Film and Television Arts "acknowledging the nurturing of a whole new generation of writers, actors and producers and in bringing new blood and new talent into the industry." The company was sold in 2012.

Heyman's World Group of Companies Limited continues to actively produce and co-finance films and television shows. At the time of his death, he was in pre-production on a number of projects including a Sino-Italian co-production of a 12-hour mini-series titled The Forbidden City, a film titled The Silk Road, and television projects, including You the Jury, Forbidden Lovers, and a contemporary drama based on modern versions of the biblical Parables and Proverbs.

== Personal life and death ==
In 1960, Heyman married actress Norma Pownall. They had two children, including David Heyman, who became a producer. They divorced in the 1960s after his affair with actress Joanna Shimkus. He was married to Nizza Heyman from 1982 until his death; they had two children together.

Heyman died on 9 June 2017 at the age of 84.

== Selected filmography ==
He was a producer in all films unless otherwise noted.

=== Film ===
Year	Film	Credit	Notes
1964	Hamlet		
1967	Privilege		
1968	Boom!		
1968	Secret Ceremony		
1969	Lola	Executive producer	
1970	Bloomfield		
1971	The Go-Between		
1972	Black Gunn		
1973	Hitler: The Last Ten Days	Executive producer	
1973	A Doll's House	Executive producer	
1979	Jesus		
1984	A Passage to India	Executive producer	Uncredited
1985	D.A.R.Y.L.		Final film as a producer

Miscellaneous crew

Year	Film	Role
1984	A Passage to India	In association with

Thanks

Year	Film	Role	Notes
2007	Shipwrecked Adventures of Donkey Ollie	Grateful thanks	
2008	A Federal Case	Very special thanks	
2008	Exodus to Egypt	The producers wish to thank	Direct-to-video

=== Television ===
Year	Title	Credit	Notes
1959	Saturday Spectacular	Associate producer	
1973	Divorce His, Divorce Hers	Executive producer	Television film
2008	Never Better	Executive producer	Television pilot

Miscellaneous crew

Year	Title	Role	Notes
1966	Double Your Money	Program associate	
1973	Divorce His, Divorce Hers	Presenter	Television film

Thanks

Year	Title	Role
2010	The Adventures of Donkey Ollie	Thanks
