= The Phantom of the Opera (1962 film) =

1962 British film by Terence Fisher

- US theatrical release poster
- Directed by: Terence Fisher
- Screenplay by: Anthony Hinds
- Based on: The Phantom of the Opera; 1910 novel by Gaston Leroux
- Produced by: Anthony Hinds; Basil Keys
- Starring: Herbert Lom; Heather Sears; Edward de Souza; Michael Gough
- Cinematography: Arthur Grant
- Edited by: Alfred Cox
- Music by: Edwin Astley
- Production company: Hammer Film Productions
- Distributed by: J. Arthur Rank Film Distributors (UK); Universal Pictures (USA)
- Release dates: 25 June 1962; (U.K.); 15 August 1962 (U.S.)
- Running time: 84 minutes (UK) (extended U.S. TV print 94 minutes)
- Country: United Kingdom
- Language: English
- Budget: £180,000
- Box office: 580,164 admissions (France)

The Phantom of the Opera is a 1962 British horror film directed by Terence Fisher and starring Herbert Lom, Heather Sears, Michael Gough and Edward de Souza. The screenplay was by Anthony Hinds (as John Elder) loosely adapted from the 1910 novel of the same name by Gaston Leroux. The film was made by Hammer Film Productions but was a financial failure. The British prints were in Technicolor, while the U.S. prints were in Eastman Color.

== Plot ==
In 1900, at the London Opera House, a new opera by Lord Ambrose D'Arcy opens. However, the theatre is not completely sold out. No one will sit in Box #5, which is believed to be haunted. When the body of a murdered stagehand swings out of the wings during the first aria of Maria, the show's star, pandemonium ensues.

With the show postponed and Maria refusing to perform again, producer Harry Hunter auditions new singers. He finds a promising star in Christine Charles, one of the chorus girls. Enamored, Lord Ambrose invites Christine to dinner. In her dressing room, Christine is warned against him by a bodiless voice. That night, Lord Ambrose attempts to seduce Christine, but Harry saves her. On the ride back home, Christine tells Harry about the voice she heard.

Intrigued, Harry takes Christine back to the opera house. In her dressing room, the voice tells Harry to leave. Meanwhile, the rat-catcher is murdered by a dwarf. Investigating the murder, Harry leaves Christine, who is then approached by a masked man, The Phantom of the Opera. He says she must come with him, but she screams, making him flee.

The next day Lord Ambrose sends a dismissal to Christine for refusing to come back to his apartment. He chooses a more willing but less talented singer to take Christine's place. Visiting Christine at her boarding house, Harry finds an old draft of the opera he produced. It was written by Professor Petrie, a former boarder who was supposedly killed during a fire at the press that was to print his music. Petrie was splashed with Nitric Acid while trying to extinguish the blaze. According to a policeman, Petrie then ran away in agony and was drowned in the Thames. However, the body was never recovered. Harry is convinced that Lord Ambrose stole Petrie's music.

Returning home, Christine is confronted by the dwarf and faints from fright. When she wakes, she is in the Phantom's lair deep in the cellars of the opera house. The Phantom tells Christine that he will teach her to sing and rehearses her with insistence until she collapses from exhaustion. Meanwhile, Harry, reinstated as the opera producer, is worried about Christine's disappearance and checks the river where Petrie had last been seen. He then hears the echo of Christine's voice emanating from a storm drain. He follows the voice through a water-filled sewer. The faint sound of the Phantom's organ-playing draws Harry down a tunnel where the dwarf attacks him with a knife. Harry subdues him and finds himself facing the Phantom, who is actually Petrie himself.

Five years before, as a poor and starving composer, Petrie had been forced to sell all of his music, including the opera, to Lord Ambrose for a small fee with the thought that his being published would bring him recognition. After discovering that Lord Ambrose was publishing the music under his own name, Petrie became enraged and broke into the printers to destroy the plates. While burning the already printed music, Petrie unwittingly started a fire and accidentally splashed acid on his face and hands in an effort to put it out, thinking it was water. In agony, he jumped into the river and was swept by the current into an underground drain, where he was rescued and cared for by the dwarf. The Phantom is dying and wishes to see his opera performed by Christine. Harry and Christine agree to allow him time to complete her coaching.

Weeks later, on the eve of a performance of "Saint Joan," the Phantom confronts Lord Ambrose. He rips off The Phantom's mask and runs out screaming into the night after seeing his deformed face. The Phantom then watches Christine sing from Box #5. Her performance brings him to tears. Listening enraptured, the dwarf is discovered in the catwalks by a stage-hand, and in the chase, he jumps onto a chandelier poised high over Christine. As the rope begins to break from the weight, the Phantom rips off his mask, leaps to the stage and pushes Christine safely from harm. The chandelier impales him before the eyes of the horror-stricken audience.

== Cast ==
- Herbert Lom as The Phantom/Professor Petrie
- Heather Sears as Christine Charles
- Edward de Souza as Harry Hunter
- Thorley Walters as Lattimer
- Michael Gough as Lord Ambrose D'Arcy
- Harold Goodwin as Bill
- Martin Miller as Rossi
- Liane Aukin as Maria
- Sonya Cordeau as Yvonne
- Marne Maitland as Xavier
- Miriam Karlin as charwoman
- Patrick Troughton as ratcatcher
- Renée Houston as Mrs Tucker
- Keith Pyott as Weaver
- John Harvey as Sergeant Vickers
- Michael Ripper as 1st cabby
- Miles Malleson as 2nd cabby
- Ian Wilson as the dwarf
- Ivor Evans as opera singer (uncredited) – his voice was overdubbed

Patricia Clark provided the dubbed-over soprano voice for Heather Sears.

== Production ==
Based upon the interest generated by the Phantom of the Opera sequence in the Lon Chaney biopic Man of a Thousand Faces, and the success of the 1943 remake, Universal was interested in revisiting the story again. The first plans for remake were in-studio, with William Alland producing and Franklin Coen writing. Plans for this remake fell through, but upon the success of the distribution of Dracula for Hammer, Universal decided to let the British studio tackle the project instead and announced the project in February 1959.

Two months later, Hammer Pictures struck a five-year deal with Columbia Pictures to produce five films a year. On these terms, Hammer's previous arrangements (such as The Mummy for Universal Studios and The Hound of the Baskervilles for United Artists) could be fulfilled, but thereafter could produce only two pictures a year for other studios. Phantom of the Opera was among those announced for Universal.

Over the next two years, the project fell on and off the charts. In 1960, the project was connected with Kathryn Grayson, although she had not been in pictures for some years. According to author Wayne Kinsey's interpretation of a quote from producer Anthony Hinds, the romantic lead (Harry Hunter) was written for Cary Grant . Grant had expressed his interest in doing a Hammer horror film, at a time when it was common for American actors to be featured in British films. Actually, what Hinds said repeatedly in interviews was, "I wrote the script for Cary Grant," which makes it far more likely Grant was to play the title role, not a subordinate leading man.

Production for the film started in November 1961. As with most of the Hammer productions, the film was shot at Bray Studios on a modest budget. Lom recalled in one interview how the producers at Hammer expected actors to throw themselves into their work: "For one of my scenes, the Hammer people wanted me to smash my head against a stone pillar, because they said they couldn't afford one made of rubber," Lom reveals. "I refused to beat my head against stone, of course. This caused a 'big crisis', because it took them half a day to make a rubber pillar that looked like stone. And of course, it cost a few pennies more. Horror indeed!"

Many of the exterior sets utilised were on the studio's backlot and had already been used for many Hammer productions previously. Interiors of the "London Opera House" were filmed at the Wimbledon Theatre in London, which was rented for three weeks. Over 100 musicians and chorus people were hired for the shoot. The film had a reported budget initially of £200,000, but it was reported after principal shooting to be £400,000, both figures unusually high for a Hammer film.

All of the flashback scenes showing how Professor Petrie became the Phantom were filmed with "Dutch angles," meaning the camera was noticeably tilted to give an unreal, off-kilter effect: a time-honored method in film of representing either a flashback or a dream.

The Phantom of the Opera opened in New York City on 22 August 1962 at the RKO Palace Theater. In person was Sonya Cordeau, who played "Yvonne" in the picture. Cordeau later went on tour with the film for Universal.

When the film had its American TV premiere on NBC, additional footage of Scotland Yard police inspectors (played by Liam Redmond and John Maddison) looking for the Phantom was filmed to increase the running time. This footage was shot at Universal Studios, and Hammer Productions had no input at all. Kiss of the Vampire and The Evil of Frankenstein also had American-shot footage added to their television showings. This was a common practice when it was thought that parts of the film were "too intense." These scenes were edited out, and more acceptable scenes replaced them to extend the running time.

In common with Hammer's usual practice, when shown in British cinemas in 1962, the film was paired with Captain Clegg, another of the studio's films.

== Music ==
The music in this movie features Johann Sebastian Bach's Toccata and Fugue in D minor, arguably the most famous piece of organ music ever composed, and one that has become commonly associated with horror films. The trailer uses stock music from Revenge of the Creature due to both of them being released by Universal.

== Critical reception ==
The Monthly Film Bulletin wrote: "The absurd, much-filmed story crumbles—at any rate here—once the ingénue is reconciled to The Phantom as her mentor; but its Gothic elements are rich enough to defy time ... Surprisingly tasteful for a Hammer film, the production is also quite imaginative (The Phantom's rocky, water-lapped lair, complete with organ and double-bed) and careful."

Howard Thompson of The New York Times called the film "a real disappointment ... In the hands of the British, with Herbert Lom as the opera ogre, the result is ornate and pretty dull. Whatever happened, chaps?"

Variety wrote that the film "still provides a fair measure of goose pimples to combat some potential unwanted yocks. In the shadow of its predecessors the current 'Phantom' seems a reasonable booking for average houses, without doing anything to erase oldtimers' memories of the earlier versions."

Harrison's Reports gave the film a grade of "Fair", writing, "The story of creative fakery, revenge and danger is not only loosely woven together, but its believability is weak. Its dénouement is thin and vaporish."

The Hammer Story: The Authorised History of Hammer Films wrote of the film: "Although distinguished by some fine acting, sets and music, The Phantom of the Opera seems decidedly half-baked." The author(s) called Terence Fisher's direction "misguided", and noted that distributor J. Arthur Rank Film Distributors' "emasculation of the British print sealed its fate."

== Home video ==
In the United Kingdom, the film was released on VHS by CIC Video, having received a home-video classification from the British Board of Film Classification on 9 November 1987. On 21 July 2014, Final Cut Entertainment released the film on DVD and Blu-ray, with supplementary features including a making-of documentary and stills gallery. In June 2021, Powerhouse Films released the film in the United Kingdom under its Indicator label as part of the limited-edition Hammer Volume Six: Night Shadows Blu-ray box set. The release featured a 2K restoration of the original 85-minute theatrical version in both 1.66:1 and 1.85:1 presentations, as well as the 99-minute alternative television cut. Indicator released a standalone Blu-ray was released on 26 February 2024.

In the United States, the film was released on VHS in 1995 by MCA Universal Home Video. On 6 September 2005, Universal released the film in North America alongside seven other Hammer horror films in the four-disc DVD collection The Hammer Horror Series. The same eight films were subsequently released on Blu-ray by Universal as the Hammer Horror 8-Film Collection on 13 September 2016. On 11 August 2020, Shout! Factory released a Collector's Edition Blu-ray under its Scream Factory label. The edition featured a new 2K restoration from an interpositive, presented in both 1.85:1 and 1.66:1 aspect ratios, as well as its longer television broadcast

In Germany, Anolis Entertainment, in collaboration with Koch Media, released the film on Blu-ray on 29 September 2017 under the title Das Rätsel der unheimlichen Maske. The release included the original German theatrical dubbing, which had previously been considered lost. The release also featured an improved HD master, the original German opening titles, an audio commentary and a making-of documentary.
