= Anthony Masters =

British film production designer (1919–1990)

- Born: 9 November 1919; Eltham, England
- Died: 12 May 1990 (aged 70); France
- Other name: Tony Masters
- Occupations: Production designer, set decorator
- Years active: 1949 - 1987

Anthony Masters (1919 – 12 May 1990) was a British production designer and set decorator. He was nominated for an Academy Award in the category Best Art Direction for the film 2001: A Space Odyssey.

He was married to actress Heather Sears from 1957 until his death.

== Selected filmography ==
- Tai-Pan (1986)
- The Clan of the Cave Bear (1986)
- Dune (1984)
- The Deep (1977)
- Buffalo Bill and the Indians, or Sitting Bull's History Lesson (1976)
- Papillon (1973)
- 2001: A Space Odyssey (1968)
