= Strangers in the City =

Strangers in the City may refer to:

- Strangers in the City (2010 film), a Japanese thriller film
- Strangers in the City (1962 film), an American drama film
