= Peter Newbrook =

British cinematographer (1920–2009)

- Born: 29 June 1920; Chester, England
- Died: 19 June 2009 (aged 88); Norwich, England
- Education: Ewell Castle School
- Occupations: Cinematographer; Director; Producer; Writer

Peter Austin Harley Newbrook BSC (29 June 1920 – 19 June 2009) was an English cinematographer, director, producer and writer.

Newbrook was born in Chester and educated at the Chester, and Worcester Cathedral schools, and the Ewell Castle School. He began his career as a trainee cameraman and focus puller with Warner Brothers British studios at Teddington in London. During the Second World War he made Army training films with the Army Kinematograph Service and was commissioned as a Second Lieutenant. In 1947, with drummer Carlo Krahmer, he co-founded Esquire Records, which specialised in jazz.

In the 1970s due to the decline of the British film industry he turned to television. He worked at Granada and Yorkshire Television and spent several years with Anglia Television in Norwich, making episodes of the popular drama series Tales of the Unexpected. He retired in 1990 as a senior lighting director.

He was president of the British Society of Cinematographers from 1984 to 1986.

Peter Newbrook died of a heart attack at his home in Norwich on Friday, 19 June 2009.

== Selected filmography ==
- Scott of the Antarctic (1948)
- The Sound Barrier (1952)
- The Bridge on the River Kwai (1957)
- A Farewell to Arms (1957)
- Lawrence of Arabia (1962)
- In the Cool of the Day (1963)
- The Black Torment (1964)
- Gonks Go Beat (1965)
- The Sandwich Man (1966)
- Press for Time (1966)
- The Smashing Bird I Used to Know (1969)
- She'll Follow You Anywhere (1971)
- Crucible of Terror (1971)
- The Asphyx (1973)
