= 1969 in the United Kingdom =

Events from the year 1969 in the United Kingdom. The year is dominated by the beginnings of the Troubles in Northern Ireland.

== Incumbents ==
- Monarch – Elizabeth II
- Prime Minister – Harold Wilson (Labour)

== Events ==
=== January ===
- January – The Space hopper toy is introduced to the United Kingdom.
- 2 January
  - People's Democracy begins a march from Belfast to Derry City, Northern Ireland to gain publicity and to promote its cause.
  - Australian media mogul Rupert Murdoch purchases the best-selling UK Sunday newspaper The News of the World.
- 4 January – Guitarist Jimi Hendrix causes complaints of arrogance from television producers after playing an impromptu version of "Sunshine Of Your Love" past his allotted timeslot on the BBC1 programme Happening for Lulu.
- 5 January – Ariana Afghan Airlines Flight 701 crashes into a house on its approach to Gatwick Airport, killing 50 of the 62 people on board and two of the home's occupants.
- 10 January – Protesters in Northern Ireland defy police orders to abandon a planned march.
- 14 January – Sir Matt Busby, hugely successful manager of Manchester United F.C. for the last twenty-four years, announces his retirement as manager. He will become a director at the end of the season, and hand over first-team duties to current first team trainer and former player Wilf McGuinness.
- 17 January – Secretary of State for Employment and Productivity Barbara Castle publishes a White Paper In Place of Strife proposing powers of intervention in advance of industrial action. This proves unacceptable to the Trades Union Congress.
- 18 January – Pete Best wins his defamation lawsuit against The Beatles. He had originally sought $8,000,000 but is awarded considerably less.
- 24 January
  - Violent protests by students about the installation of steel security gates close the London School of Economics, which does not reopen for three weeks.
  - Launch of the Ford Capri, a four-seater sporting coupe designed to compete with the likes of the MG B and which Ford expects to become a top 10 seller in the United Kingdom.
- 27 January
  - London School of Economics students occupy the University of London Union building in Malet Street in protest at the temporary closure of the LSE.
  - Reverend Ian Paisley, the hard line Protestant leader in Northern Ireland, is jailed for three months for illegal assembly.
- 30 January – The Beatles' rooftop concert: The Beatles perform together in public for the final time, on the rooftop of Apple Records in London; the impromptu concert is broken up by the police.

=== February ===
- 18 February – Pop star Lulu, 20, marries Maurice Gibb of the Bee Gees at St James Church, Gerrards Cross.

=== March ===
- 4 March – The Kray twins are both found guilty of murder: Ronnie of murdering George Cornell; Reggie of murdering Jack "the Hat" McVitie. On 5 March, they are sentenced to life imprisonment with a recommended minimum of thirty years by Mr Justice Melford Stevenson.
- 5 March – The first B&Q DIY superstore is set up in Southampton by Richard Block and David Quayle.
- 7 March – The London Underground Victoria line is opened by The Queen.
- 12 March – Paul McCartney marries Linda Eastman at Marylebone register office in London.
- 17 March – The Longhope life-boat from Orkney is lost; all eight crew members on board perish.
- 19 March
  - British paratroopers and Marines land on the island of Anguilla, ending its unrecognized independence.
  - The 385-metre tall Emley Moor transmitting station television mast in West Yorkshire collapses because of ice.
- 20 March – John Lennon marries Japanese artist Yoko Ono in Gibraltar.
- 27 March – First ordination of a woman in the Church of Scotland takes place, that of Catherine McConnachie by the Presbytery of Aberdeen.
- 29 March – Lulu, representing the UK with the song "Boom Bang-a-Bang", shares first place in the Eurovision Song Contest in a four-way tie with France, the Netherlands and the host country, Spain.

=== April ===
- April – The Raleigh Chopper children's wheelie bike is launched.
- 1 April – The Hawker Siddeley Harrier GR.1 V/STOL "jump jet" fighter enters service with the Royal Air Force.
- 9 April
  - The British prototype Concorde airliner makes its first flight, from Bristol Filton Airport (the first French flight was on 2 March).
  - Sikh busmen in Wolverhampton win the right to wear their turbans whilst on duty.
- 15 April - Roy Jenkins, Chancellor of the Exchequer, ends tax relief on loan interest except for business loans and home loans.
- 17 April
  - Representation of the People Act lowers the voting age from 21 to 18 with effect from February 1970. It also permits candidates to have a party label included on the ballot paper; removes the right (theoretically restored in 1967) of convicted prisoners to vote in Parliamentary elections; and in local government elections abolishes plural voting by owners of business premises (except in the City of London).
  - Bernadette Devlin wins the Mid Ulster by-election and becomes the youngest female MP (until 2015) at 21 years old.
- 20 April – British troops arrive in Northern Ireland to reinforce the Royal Ulster Constabulary.
- 22 April – Robin Knox-Johnston becomes the first person to make a solo non-stop global circumnavigation under sail, returning to Falmouth, Cornwall.
- 24 April
  - British Leyland Motor Corporation launches the United Kingdom's first production hatchback car, the Austin Maxi, designed to compete with family saloons like the Ford Cortina and following a new European design concept started in 1965 by French carmaker Renault's R16 range.
  - The final episode of the long-running BBC Radio serial drama Mrs Dale's Diary is broadcast.
- 26 April – Manchester City F.C. win the FA Cup with a 1-0 win over Leicester City in the Wembley final.
- 28 April – Leeds United win the Football League First Division title for the first time in their history.

=== May ===
- 2 May – Ocean liner Queen Elizabeth 2 departs from Southampton on her maiden voyage to New York.
- 22 May – Chichester by-election, Christopher Chataway, who had lost his previous seat in the 1966 election, holds the seat for the Conservative Party.
- 23 May – The Who release the concept album Tommy. (On 14 December they perform it as a rock opera on stage at the London Coliseum.)
- 29 May – Carry On Camping is released, becoming the year's most popular film at the UK box office.

=== June ===
- 7 June – Rock supergroup Blind Faith plays its first gig in front of 100,000 people in London's Hyde Park.
- 14 June – The black horse Burmese, ridden by the Queen, makes her first appearance at Trooping the Colour; the horse will continue in this role until 1986.
- 21 June
  - The showing of television documentary The Royal Family, attracted more than 30,600,000 viewers, more than half of the entire UK population at the time, an all-time British record for a non-current event programme.
  - Patrick Troughton makes his final appearance as the Second Doctor in Doctor Who in the final episode of The War Games which is also the last episode to be recorded in black and white.
- 24 June – After the 1969 Rhodesian constitutional referendum votes in favour of becoming a Republic, the Governor of Southern Rhodesia Sir Humphrey Gibbs leaves Government House, severing Rhodesia's last diplomatic relationship with the United Kingdom.
- 30 June – Two members of the Mudiad Amddiffyn Cymru (Movement for the Defence of Wales) are killed when a bomb they are planting outside government offices in Abergele in an attempt to disrupt the following day's events explodes prematurely.

=== July ===
- 1 July
  - Prince Charles (the future Charles III), is invested as Prince of Wales at Caernarfon.
  - John Lennon, Yoko Ono and their children are hospitalised at Golspie in Scotland following a car accident while on holiday.
- 3 July – Swansea is granted city status.
- 5 July – The Rolling Stones performs at the free festival The Stones in the Park outdoors in Hyde Park, London, in front of at least a quarter of a million fans, two days after the death of founder Brian Jones.
- 10 July – Donald Crowhurst's sailing trimaran Teignmouth Electron is found drifting and unoccupied in mid-Atlantic; it is presumed that Crowhurst committed suicide (or fell overboard) at sea earlier in the month, having falsified his progress in the solo Sunday Times Golden Globe Race.
- 12 July – Golfer Tony Jacklin wins The Open Championship, the first British player to do so since 1951.
- 20–21 July – BBC Television continues broadcasting overnight to provide coverage of the Apollo 11 Moon landing; Neil Armstrong's first steps on the surface take place at 03:56 British Summer Time on 21 July. Television coverage to Europe is transmitted via Goonhilly Satellite Earth Station in Cornwall.
- 23 July – BBC2 television first airs the Pot Black snooker tournament.
- 24 July – British lecturer Gerald Brooke is freed from a Soviet prison in exchange for the spies Morris and Lona Cohen.
- 25 July – The Family Law Reform Act 1969 receives royal assent and comes partly into effect in England and Wales. It reduces the age of majority from 21 to 18 (with effect from 1 January 1970); allows a bastard child to inherit on the intestacy of a parent; and allows competent 16- and 17-year-olds to consent to medical treatment.

=== August ===
- 1 August – The pre-decimal halfpenny ceases to be legal tender.
- 8 August – The Beatles at 11:30 have photographer Iain Macmillan take their photo on a zebra crossing on Abbey Road, London.
- 12 August – The Troubles: Violence erupts after the Apprentice Boys of Derry march in Derry, Northern Ireland, resulting in a three-day communal riot known as the Battle of the Bogside, and four days of sectarian violence elsewhere in Northern Ireland.
- 13 August – The Taoiseach of the Republic of Ireland, Jack Lynch, makes a speech on Teilifís Éireann saying that his government "can no longer stand by" and requesting a United Nations peacekeeping force for Northern Ireland.
- 14 August – British troops are deployed in Northern Ireland to restore law and order.
- 30–31 August – The second Isle of Wight Festival attracts 150,000 pop music fans, paying £10 2s for a 3-day ticket, with the appearance of Bob Dylan a major draw.

=== September ===
- 11 September – The housing charity Shelter releases a report claiming that there are up to 3,000,000 people in need of rehousing due to poor living conditions.
- 16 September – Iconic 1960s fashion store Biba reopens on Kensington High Street.
- 21 September – Police evicts squatters of the London Street Commune from 144 Piccadilly.
- 26 September – The Beatles release their Abbey Road album which is an enormous commercial success and, although receiving mixed reviews at this time, comes to be viewed by many as the group's best.
- 28 September – The National Trust acquires ownership of the island of Lundy.

=== October ===
- 1 October – The Post Office becomes a statutory corporation.
- 5 October – The first episode of surreal sketch comedy series Monty Python's Flying Circus is broadcast on BBC Television.
- 10 October – The Government accepts the recommendations of Lord Hunt's report on policing in Northern Ireland, including the abolition of the Ulster Special Constabulary.
- 13 October – An unofficial strike amongst British mineworkers begins, over the working hours of surface workers.
- 14 October
  - The new seven-sided fifty pence coin is introduced as replacement for the ten-shilling note, to a mixed reception from the British public, with many people complaining that it is easily confused with the 10p coin.
  - With a general election due within the next eighteen months, opinion polls show the Conservatives comfortably ahead of Labour, by up to 24 points.
- 16 October – Peter Nichols' black comedy The National Health is premiered by the National Theatre at the Old Vic in London.
- 21 October – Led Zeppelin release Led Zeppelin II to critical acclaim and commercial success.
- 27 October – A mass wildlife cull takes place in Surrey after 2 people are bitten by a rabid dog.

=== November ===
- 15 November – Regular colour television broadcasts begin on BBC1 and ITV.
- 16 November – BBC One first broadcasts the children's television series Clangers, made by Oliver Postgate and Peter Firmin's Smallfilms in stop motion animation.
- 17 November – The Sun newspaper is relaunched as a tabloid under the ownership of Rupert Murdoch.
- 19 November – Ken Loach's film Kes is released at the London Film Festival.
- 25 November – John Lennon returns his MBE to protest against the British Government's involvement in Biafra and support of the U.S. war in Vietnam.

=== December ===
- 5 December – The Rolling Stones album Let It Bleed is released.
- 10 December – Derek Harold Richard Barton wins the Nobel Prize in Chemistry jointly with Odd Hassel "for their contributions to the development of the concept of conformation and its application in chemistry".
- 15 December – Martins Bank is purchased by Barclays.
- 17 December – Constitutional law case of Anisminic Ltd v Foreign Compensation Commission decided in the House of Lords establishes in English administrative law the "collateral fact doctrine", that any error of law made by a public body will make its decision a nullity and that a statutory exclusion clause does not deprive the courts from their jurisdiction in judicial review unless it expressly states this.
- 18 December
  - The abolition of the death penalty for murder is made permanent by Parliament.
  - The sixth James Bond film – On Her Majesty's Secret Service – is released in UK cinemas. Bond is played by Australian-born model George Lazenby for the only time, after Sean Connery quit the role following You Only Live Twice. Starring alongside him is Yorkshire-born actress Diana Rigg.
- 26 December – A fire at the Rose and Crown Hotel, Saffron Walden, kills eleven.
- 30 December – The Linwood bank robbery in Scotland leaves two police officers dead.

=== Undated ===
- Golden eagles are found to be nesting in England for the first time in modern history, at Haweswater in the Lake District.
- Completion of the Castle Vale estate in Birmingham, the largest postwar housing estate in the United Kingdom. The new estate predominantly consists of council housing, including 34 tower blocks – the largest number on any single British housing estate. The first residents moved onto Castle Vale in 1964 when the first houses and flats were completed.

== Publications ==
- Kingsley Amis's novel The Green Man.
- Agatha Christie's Hercule Poirot novel Hallowe'en Party.
- John Fowles' novel The French Lieutenant's Woman.
- Antonia Fraser's biography Mary Queen of Scots.
- George MacDonald Fraser's novel Flashman.
- P. H. Newby's novel Something to Answer For.
- The anthology Children of Albion: Poetry of the Underground in Britain edited by Michael Horovitz.

== Births ==
=== January – March ===
- 1 January – Nicholas Gleaves, actor and playwright
- 4 January – Mary Macleod, lawyer and politician
- 12 January – David Mitchell, English author
- 13 January – Stephen Hendry, Scottish snooker player
- 22 January – Olivia d'Abo, English actress
- 5 February – Michael Sheen, Welsh actor
- 6 February – Tim Sherwood, English football player and manager
- 12 February – Kanya King, businesswoman (died 2026)
- 19 February – Stewart Faulkner, English long jumper
- 20 February – Robin Ince, English comedian and writer
- 21 February – James Dean Bradfield, Welsh musician (Manic Street Preachers)
- 28 February – Sadie Morgan, English architect and designer
- 1 March – Dafydd Ieuan, Welsh drummer (Super Furry Animals)
- 4 March – Jez Butterworth, dramatist and screenwriter
- 5 March – Paul Blackthorne, English actor
- 15 March – Monica Dolan, actress
- 17 March – Alexander McQueen, fashion designer (died 2010)
- 20 March – Yvette Cooper, politician
- 31 March – Annabelle Neilson, British socialite (d. 2018)

=== April – June ===
- 4 April – Karren Brady, English sporting business executive
- 9 April
  - Tracie Andrews, English criminal convicted of murdering her fiancé
  - Barnaby Kay, actor
- 22 April – Dion Dublin, football player and commentator
- 26 April – Kate Hardie, actress, director and screenwriter
- 27 April
  - Darcey Bussell, ballerina
  - Tess Daly, English television presenter
  - Mica Paris, born Michelle Wallen, soul singer, presenter and actress
- 6 May – Jim Magilton, Northern Irish footballer
- 21 May – Martin Harris, English backstroke swimmer
- 25 May – Dominic Mohan, journalist
- June – Emma Walmsley, English business executive
- 2 June
  - Cy Chadwick, English actor and producer
  - Jamie Thraves, English film writer, director and music video director
- 16 June – Shami Chakrabarti, politician and human rights activist
- 22 June – Simon Taylor, English graphic artist

=== July – September ===
- 26 July – Tanni Grey-Thompson, British Paralympian
- 1 August – Graham Thorpe, English cricketer (suicide 2024)
- 4 August – Jojo Moyes, English romance novelist
- 7 August – Domino Harvey, British bounty hunter (died 2005)
- 11 August – Ashley Jensen, Scottish actress
- 29 August – Joe Swail, Northern Irish snooker player
- 4 September – James Cleverly, English politician
- 20 September – Jo Jennings, English high jumper
- 22 September – Sue Perkins, English comedy performer
- 25 September – Catherine Zeta-Jones, Welsh actress
- 26 September – Paul Warhurst, English football player
- 28 September – Angus Robertson, Scottish politician

=== October – December ===
- 9 October
  - PJ Harvey, English rock singer-songwriter and instrumentalist
  - Steve McQueen, black British film director
- 15 October – Dominic West, English actor
- 16 October – Suzanne Virdee, BBC newsreader
- 1 November – Diane Parish, actress
- 13 November – Gerard Butler, Scottish actor
- 19 November – Michael Lee, English rock drummer (died 2008)
- 3 December – Bill Steer, musician
- 5 December
  - Sajid Javid, English Conservative politician and Cabinet minister
  - Catherine Tate, actress and comedian
- 11 December – Phil Spencer, TV personality
- 12 December
  - Rodney P (Panton), MC, "godfather of British hip hop"
  - Sophie Kinsella, novelist (died 2025)
- 18 December – Irvin Duguid, Scottish rock keyboard player (Stiltskin)
- 19 December – Richard Hammond, English TV presenter
- 22 December – Mark Robins, football player and manager
- 24 December
  - Nick Love, film director and writer
  - Ed Miliband, English politician, leader of the Labour Party
- 30 December – Jay Kay, English jazz-funk singer-songwriter (Jamiroquai)

== Deaths ==
=== January – March ===
- 4 January – Daisy and Violet Hilton, English-born conjoined twin actresses (born 1908)
- 8 January – Albert Hill, English-born distance runner (born 1889)
- 11 January – Richmal Crompton, fiction writer (born 1890)
- 2 February – Boris Karloff, English actor (born 1887)
- 14 February – Kenneth Horne, radio comedy performer (born 1907)
- 16 February – Kingsley Martin, political editor (born 1897)
- 11 March – John Wyndham, English science fiction writer (born 1903)
- 25 March – Billy Cotton, English bandleader and entertainer, stroke (born 1899)
- 26 March – Dickie Pride, rock and roll singer, overdose (born 1941)
- 31 March – George de la Warr, alternative physician (born 1904)

=== April – June ===
- 4 May – Sir Osbert Sitwell, English writer (born 1892)
- 23 May – Sir Owen Williams, civil engineer (born 1890)
- 22 June – Judy Garland, American film actress and singer (born 1922)

=== July – September ===
- 3 July – Brian Jones, British musician (The Rolling Stones) (born 1942)
- 9 August – Cecil Frank Powell, British physicist, Nobel Prize laureate (born 1903)
- 27 August – Ivy Compton-Burnett, English novelist (born 1884)
- 25 September – Frank Inglis, British air vice marshal (born 1899)

=== October – December ===
- 18 November – Ted Heath, bandleader (born 1902)
- 4 December – Oswald Short, aviation pioneer and aircraft builder, youngest of the Short Brothers (born 1883)
- 5 December – Princess Alice of Battenberg, wife of Prince Andrew of Greece and Denmark and mother of Prince Philip, Duke of Edinburgh (born 1885)
- 7 December
  - Eric Portman, actor (born 1901)
  - Hugh Williams, actor and dramatist (born 1904)

== See also ==
- 1969 in British music
- 1969 in British television
- List of British films of 1969
