= 1969 in British music =

This is a summary of 1969 in music in the United Kingdom.

== Events ==
- 4 January – Guitarist Jimi Hendrix is accused of arrogance by TV producers after playing an impromptu version of "Sunshine of Your Love" past his allotted timeslot on the BBC1 show Happening for Lulu.
- 12 January – Led Zeppelin's eponymous début album is released.
- 18 January – Pete Best wins his defamation lawsuit against The Beatles. Best had originally sought $8 million, but ended up being awarded much less.
- 30 January – The Beatles perform for the last time in public, on the roof of the Apple building at 3 Savile Row, London. The performance, which is filmed for the Let It Be movie, is stopped early by police after neighbors complain about the noise.
- 3 February – John Lennon, George Harrison and Ringo Starr hire Allen Klein as The Beatles' new business manager against the wishes of Paul McCartney.
- 4 February – Paul McCartney hires the law firm of Eastman & Eastman, Linda Eastman's father's law firm, as general legal counsel for Apple.
- 18 February – Lulu and Maurice Gibb are married.
- 2 March – John Lennon performs publicly outside The Beatles for the first time, with Yoko Ono at an improvised concert in Cambridge.
- 12 March
  - Paul McCartney marries Linda Eastman in London.
  - George Harrison and his wife Pattie are arrested on charges of hashish possession.
- 20 March – John Lennon and Yoko Ono are married at a 10-minute ceremony in the British Consulate Office in Gibraltar.
- 29 March – At the 14th annual Eurovision Song Contest held at the Teatro Real, Madrid, Spain, the final result is a four-way tie for first place between Spain ("Vivo cantando" – Salomé); United Kingdom ("Boom Bang-a-Bang" – Lulu); Netherlands ("De troubadour" – Lenny Kuhr) and France ("Un jour, un enfant" – Frida Boccara). As there is no tie-break rule, the four entries involved, who each scored 18 points, are declared joint winners.
- 22 April
  - The first complete performance of The Who's rock opera Tommy during a performance in Dolton, Devon, UK
  - Peter Maxwell Davies conducts the premiere performance of his monodrama Eight Songs for a Mad King at the Queen Elizabeth Hall.
  - John Lennon officially changes his name from John Winston Lennon to John Winston Ono Lennon.
- 24 April – The Beatles make a $5.1 million counteroffer to the Northern Songs stockholders in an attempt to keep Associated TV from controlling the band's music.
- 2 June – John Lennon and Yoko Ono host a "Bed-In" at the Queen Elizabeth Hotel in Montreal, Quebec. The couple records the song "Give Peace a Chance" live in their suite with Tommy Smothers, Timothy Leary, and several others.
- 11 June – David Bowie releases the single "Space Oddity".
- 13 June – Mick Taylor joins the Rolling Stones.
- 29 June – Bass player Noel Redding announces to the media that he has quit the Jimi Hendrix Experience, having effectively done so during the recording of Electric Ladyland.
- 3 July – Brian Jones is found dead in the swimming pool at his home in Sussex, England, almost a month after leaving The Rolling Stones.
- 5 July – The Rolling Stones proceed with a free concert in Hyde Park, London as a tribute to Brian Jones; it is also the band's first concert with guitarist Mick Taylor. Estimates of the audience range from 250,000 to 400,000.
- 8 August – Iain Macmillan photographs the cover picture for The Beatles' album Abbey Road at a north London zebra crossing near the Abbey Road Studios.
- 16 August – David Bowie stages the Growth Summer Festival, a free concert at Croydon Road Recreation Ground in Beckenham, south London.
- 20 August – Final session for The Beatles' album Abbey Road at Abbey Road Studios in London, the last time all four members of the band are present in a studio together.
- 13 September – John Lennon and Plastic Ono Band perform at the Toronto Rock and Roll Revival 12-hour music festival, backed by Eric Clapton, Klaus Voormann and Alan White. It is Lennon's first public rock performance without one or more of The Beatles since meeting Paul McCartney in 1957. He decides before returning to Britain to leave The Beatles permanently.
- 26 September – The Beatles' album Abbey Road is released. It includes two songs written by George Harrison, "Here Comes the Sun" and "Something".
- 7 November – The Rolling Stones open their U.S. tour in Fort Collins, Colorado.
- December – Release of Fairport Convention's pioneering folk rock album Liege & Lief.
- date unknown
  - David Bedford becomes Composer in Residence at Queen's College, London.
  - James Galway begins a six-year engagement as principal flautist with the Berlin Philharmonic Orchestra.

== Charts ==
- See UK No.1 Hits of 1969

== Classical music ==
=== New works ===
- Benjamin Britten – Suite for harp, op. 83
- Gavin Bryars – The Sinking of the Titanic
- Francis Jackson – Sonata for Organ No. 1

=== Opera ===
- Harrison Birtwistle – Down by the Greenwood Side
- Peter Maxwell Davies – Eight Songs for a Mad King

== Film and incidental music ==
- John Barry – On Her Majesty's Secret Service.
- James Bernard – Frankenstein Must Be Destroyed directed by Terence Fisher, starring Peter Cushing and Freddie Jones.
- Basil Kirchin – I Start Counting, starring Jenny Agutter
- William Walton – The Battle of Britain (score only used in part).

== Musical theatre ==
- Catch My Soul
- La Strada by Lionel Bart
- Oh! Calcutta!

== Musical films ==
- Can Heironymus Merkin Ever Forget Mercy Humppe and Find True Happiness? starring Anthony Newley
- Oh! What a Lovely War

== Births ==
- 22 January – Olivia d'Abo, English-American singer-songwriter and actress
- 11 February – Shovell (Andrew Lovell), percussionist (M People)
- 21 February – James Dean Bradfield, Welsh alternative rock singer-songwriter (Manic Street Preachers)
- 28 February – Murray Gold, stage and screen composer
- 1 March – Dafydd Ieuan, Welsh alternative rock drummer (Super Furry Animals)
- 12 March – Graham Coxon, guitarist (Blur)
- 25 March – Cathy Dennis, pop singer-songwriter
- 11 April – Cerys Matthews, singer
- 22 April – Craig Logan, bassist (Bros)
- 27 April
  - Darcey Bussell, ballerina
  - Mica Paris, singer
- 14 May – Steve Hillier, songwriter (Dubstar)
- 4 June – Peter Fribbins, composer
- 26 June – Colin Greenwood, alternative rock bass player and songwriter (Radiohead)
- 13 July – Barney Greenway, extreme metal singer-songwriter (Napalm Death, Extreme Noise Terror and Benediction)
- 17 September – Adam Devlin, guitarist (The Bluetones)
- 9 October – PJ Harvey (born Polly Jean Harvey), alternative rock singer-songwriter
- 7 December – James Francis Brown, composer
- 12 December – Rodney P (born Rodney Panton), MC, "godfather of British hip hop"
- 17 December – Mick Quinn, bassist (Supergrass)
- 30 December – Jay Kay (born Jason Cheetham), funk singer-songwriter (Jamiroquai), son of singer Karen Kay
- date unknown
  - Bryn Harrison, experimental composer
  - John Webb, composer, founding member Thallein Ensemble

== Deaths ==
- 2 March – Anna Bethell, actress and singer, 76
- 25 March – Billy Cotton, bandleader, 69
- 26 March – Clara Dow, operatic soprano, 85
- 27 March – David Lloyd, tenor, 56
- 1 May – Ella Logan, actress and singer, 56 (cancer)
- 3 July – Brian Jones, guitarist, founder member of The Rolling Stones, 27 (drowned)
- 11 August – Miriam Licette, operatic soprano, 83
- 10 October – Gilbert Vinter, conductor and composer, 60
- 18 November – Ted Heath, bandleader, 67

== See also ==
- 1969 in British radio
- 1969 in British television
- 1969 in the United Kingdom
- List of British films of 1969
