= 1969 in British radio =

This is a list of events in British radio during 1969.

== Events ==
=== January ===
- 18 January – Saturday Club is aired on BBC Radio 1 for the final time.

=== February ===
- 14 February – Radio comedian Kenneth Horne collapses and dies of a heart attack while hosting the annual Guild of Television Producers' and Directors' Awards at The Dorchester hotel in London, having just presented an award to Barry Took, co-scriptwriter of Round the Horne, and invited viewers to tune in to its fifth series, due to start on 16 March. By 24 February the BBC has decided that Round the Horne cannot continue without its star and the scripts for series five are hastily reworked by writers Johnnie Mortimer and Brian Cooke with Myles Rudge into a new vehicle for former co-star Kenneth Williams called Stop Messing About which opens on BBC Radio 2 on 6 April and runs for two seasons.
- February – Mary Raine becomes the first woman to report on sport for the BBC.

=== April ===
- 25 April – The last edition of daily soap opera The Dales is broadcast on BBC Radio 2 after 5,531 episodes.
- 28 April – The first edition of daily soap opera Waggoners' Walk is broadcast on BBC Radio 2, replacing The Dales.

=== June ===
- 11 June – The Organist Entertains, presented by Robin Richmond, is broadcast for the first time.

=== July ===
- 10 July – The BBC publishes a report called "Broadcasting in the Seventies" proposing the reorganisation of programmes on the national networks and replacing regional broadcasting on BBC Radio 4 with BBC Local Radio. The report begins to be implemented the following year and the former BBC Home Service regions gradually disappear although regional programming on Radio 4 does not end fully until the end of 1982.
- 20–21 July – BBC Radios 1 and 2 stay on air all night to provide live coverage of the landing on the Moon and of Neil Armstrong's first steps onto the Moon's surface.

== Programme debuts ==
- 28 April – Waggoners' Walk on BBC Radio 2 (1969–1980)
- 11 June – The Organist Entertains on BBC Radio 2 (1969–2018)
- 6 July – The Big Business Lark on BBC Radio 4 (1969)

== Continuing radio programmes ==
=== 1940s ===
- Sunday Half Hour (1940–2018)
- Desert Island Discs (1942–Present)
- Family Favourites (1945–1980)
- Down Your Way (1946–1992)
- Letter from America (1946–2004)
- Woman's Hour (1946–Present)
- Twenty Questions (1947–1976)
- Any Questions? (1948–Present)
- A Book at Bedtime (1949–Present)

=== 1950s ===
- The Archers (1950–Present)
- Listen with Mother (1950–1982)
- From Our Own Correspondent (1955–Present)
- Pick of the Pops (1955–Present)
- The Clitheroe Kid (1957–1972)
- My Word! (1957–1988)
- Test Match Special (1957–Present)
- The Today Programme (1957–Present)
- The Navy Lark (1959–1977)
- Sing Something Simple (1959–2001)
- Your Hundred Best Tunes (1959–2007)

=== 1960s ===
- Farming Today (1960–Present)
- In Touch (1961–Present)
- The Men from the Ministry (1962–1977)
- I'm Sorry, I'll Read That Again (1964–1973)
- Petticoat Line (1965–1979)
- The World at One (1965–Present)
- The Official Chart (1967–Present)
- Just a Minute (1967–Present)
- The Living World (1968–Present)

== Births ==
- February – Fi Glover, radio presenter
- 20 February – Robin Ince, comedian
- 11 April – Cerys Matthews, Welsh singer and broadcaster
- 7 June – Adam Buxton, actor and comedian
- 14 June – Shaun Ley, news presenter
- 12 August – Nev Fountain, comedy scriptwriter
- 13 August – Toby Foster, comedian, promoter and radio presenter
- 22 August – Kathy Clugston, Northern Ireland-born newsreader
- 22 September – Sue Perkins, comedy performer and broadcast presenter
- 2 December – Matthew Sweet, cultural historian and broadcaster
- 12 December – Rodney P (Panton), MC, "godfather of British hip hop" and broadcaster

== Deaths ==
- 14 February – Kenneth Horne, radio comedian (born 1907)
- 25 March – Billy Cotton, bandleader (born 1899)
- 27 October – Eric Maschwitz, broadcasting executive, scriptwriter and lyricist (born 1901)

== See also ==
- 1969 in British music
- 1969 in British television
- 1969 in the United Kingdom
- List of British films of 1969
