= Julie Rayne =

British singer and entertainer

Julie Rayne (1930‒2025) was an English singer and entertainer, noted for her radio and television appearances and recordings from the early 1960s.

== Early life and education ==
Born Edith Rhoda Johnston in 1930 in Darlington, County Durham, she was educated at the Darlington High School for Girls.

Her first public performances were as a six-year-old, singing on the tables of her grandmother's restaurant and, later, in local cinemas. Still a teenager, she won a Carroll Levis talent contest but was too young to follow it up.

== Career ==
Rayne eschewed a career as a librarian and entered showbusiness, starting-out as soubrette with Geordie comic Bobby Thompson in the Merry Magpies revue. Soon, she moved to London, finding work in the Soho music clubs. Her first big break came when she was asked to join Dr. Crock and His Crackpots' comedy show band.

She performed briefly as Julie James and Julie Jones until signed by Norman Newell at His Master's Voice, who settled on the name Julie Rayne. Her fourth record, "Green With Envy, Purple With Passion, White With Anger, Scarlet With Fever, What Were You Doing in Her Arms Last Night Blues?" entered the Guinness Book of Records for the longest song title. She became well-known through frequent appearances on British television, most notably as one of the resident singers on the first series of Stars and Garters which was voted best entertainment series on television that year (1963) and on radio shows such as Sing it Again and Saturday Club. She played the top theatres and was backed by the top outfits of the day, including the Alan Ainsworth, Tony Osborne and John Barry Orchestras, appearing at top venues such as the Royal Festival Hall and the Royal Albert Hall. Rayne's general success was not matched by her recording career: the two tracks she had in the Top Twenty in 1964 were uncredited and, when she did record her first album, Aral Records went out-of-business just before it was to be released and the master tapes lost.

Rayne met and worked with many of the top names in music, comedy and variety. Having already worked with Cliff Richard, she was intrigued to hear him speak at a Billy Graham meeting, and this triggered her interest in wanting to know more; she even had a spell doing missionary work in the Bahamas.

Rayne then went back to study, obtaining a degree in Education at London University (Goldsmiths).

When she returned to show business full-time, she added additional strings to her bow. As a stage actress, she appeared in numerous productions, including straight theatre as well as musicals, reviews, and pantomime. She has also been a director as well as a mentor and model.

Her later performances often include one Christian song as an expression of her faith. Minister Fred B. Craddock mentions in his book an instance in Germany where she performed a version of Psalm 121 amongst popular songs from the 1940s through to the 1960s. Craddock met her after a performance and wondered why she chose to include a Christian song in her performance; he was told that she "had made a promise to God to include a song of praise in every performance".

Rayne's first TV appearance on a Val Parnell Spectacular (1958) was uncredited, as was her final one on Tonight at the London Palladium (2000). Her final appearance on live radio was on Radio 2day, Johannesburg (2012), and her final official gig was at York Theatre Royal (2016).

== Death ==
Julie died in 2025 in York.
