= Tommy Bruce =

English singer (1937–2006)

Background information
- Born: Thomas Charles Joseph Bruce; 16 July 1937; Stepney, London, England
- Died: 10 July 2006 (aged 68) Watford, Hertfordshire
- Occupation: Singer

Thomas Charles Joseph Bruce (16 July 1937 – 10 July 2006) was an English rock and roll singer who had most of his success in the early 1960s. His cover version of "Ain't Misbehavin'" was a number 3 hit in the UK singles chart in 1960.

== Life and career ==
He was born Thomas Charles Joseph Bruce, in Stepney, London. Both his parents died when he was a child and he grew up in an orphanage, later working as a van driver in Covent Garden Market before undertaking National Service in Hannover, Germany.

Returning to London in 1959, and working again as a market porter, he became a friend of his neighbour, songwriter Barry Mason. Mason suggested he record a version of the song "Ain't Misbehavin'", written by Fats Waller, in a style similar to "Chantilly Lace", a recent hit single by the Big Bopper. Produced by Norrie Paramor and released on Columbia Records, Bruce's recording rose to number 3 in the UK Singles Chart in 1960. He had no musical training, and described his own "sandpaper and gravel" singing voice with a strong London accent as "diabolical".

Backed by the Bruisers, a group of Birmingham musicians, he toured the UK on large variety bills with Billy Fury and others and they made a number of television appearances. However, his subsequent record releases were less successful, only "Broken Doll" and "Babette" making the Top 50. Another 1960 single, "On the Sunny Side of the Street" received airplay and was later used on the BBC's Pinky and Perky. From 1963, he became a regular performer on the ITV variety show Stars and Garters, becoming involved in comedy routines as well as singing. Bruce sang "Two Left Feet" for the opening credits of the 1963 film of the same name. He also was the voice of 'Gormless', the 'Speak your Weight' machine, in the 1964 film One Way Pendulum. Although he recorded further songs for a number of labels between 1965 and 1969, he largely made a living in cabaret, much of it in Spain and Malta, and also made appearances on the 1960s nostalgia circuit.

Bruce was presented with a lifetime achievement award from the Heritage Foundation Arts & Entertainment Trust in March 2006. He died from prostate cancer at home four months later, on 10 July 2006, six days before his 69th birthday. Bruce's manager Dave Lodge, who had published a biography Have Gravel Will Travel that year, described Bruce as "the most unique entertainer of his generation".

== Chart discography ==
| Year | Title | Record label | UK Singles Chart | Billed as |
|---|---|---|---|---|
| 1960 | "Ain't Misbehavin'" | Columbia | 3 | Tommy Bruce and the Bruisers |
| 1960 | "Broken Doll" | Columbia | 36 | Tommy Bruce and the Bruisers |
| 1962 | "Babette" | Columbia | 50 | Tommy Bruce |
