= Ray Martine =

English comedian (1928–2002)

- Born: Raymond Isaacs; 6 October 1928; London, England, U.K.
- Died: 19 June 2002 (aged 73); Newcastle-upon-Tyne, England, U.K.

Comedy career
- Years active: Late 1950s–1970s

Raymond Isaacs (6 October 1928 – 19 June 2002), who performed as Ray Martine, was an English comedian, especially on television in the 1960s and early 1970s.

== Life and career ==
He was born to Jewish parents in London, and served his national service in the Royal Air Force before spending time in the United States, where he heard the patter and one-liners of American comedians. On returning to England, he worked in the clothing trade, and performed as an amateur comedian in London pubs in the late 1950s and early 1960s. His style was "waspish...[and] uncompromising about problems he had faced arising from his sexuality and Jewishness". He was spotted by television journalist Daniel Farson, who booked him to appear in the East End pub he owned, the Waterman's Arms, alongside performers Rex Jameson (Mrs Shufflewick) and Queenie Watts.

As a result, Martine was recruited to host the Associated-Rediffusion variety show, Stars and Garters, initially set in Farson's pub but soon moved to a studio set. The show started in 1963, and featured singers, including Vince Hill, Kathy Kirby, and Clinton Ford. Helped by jokes written by Dick Vosburgh and Marty Feldman, Martine became popular, and recorded a comedy LP album, East End, West End, recorded at a pub, the Deuragon Arms, Hackney on December 21, 1962 and at the Establishment Club in Soho, on February 5, 1963 .

He was dropped before the third series of Stars and Garters in late 1965, and appeared as a taxi driver in The Avengers television show in 1966 (the episode "The Girl From Auntie"). His television success led to bookings in workingmen's clubs in the north of England, where he started to base himself.

He reappeared on British television in 1969, as a team member in the comedy panel show Jokers Wild, hosted by Barry Cryer and also featuring Les Dawson, Arthur Askey and Ted Ray. His appearances on the show were described as "lively and unpredictable... [and sometimes] overpoweringly disruptive." Martine appeared in most episodes of the show up to 1972, when he left.

Martine continued for some years to perform in clubs in the north of England, and also undertook after-dinner speaking. By the 1990s, he was reportedly involved in the antiques business in Newcastle upon Tyne. He died in a nursing home in Newcastle in 2002, aged 73.
