= 1969 in British television =

This is a list of British television related events from 1969.

== Events ==
=== January ===
- 3 January – ITV Granada exclusively begins showing the American cartoon series Spider-Man long before any other ITV regions.
- 4 January – Guitarist Jimi Hendrix causes complaints of arrogance from television producers after playing an impromptu version of "Sunshine Of Your Love" past his allotted timeslot on the BBC1 show Happening for Lulu.
- January – The BBC originally schedules the second series of sitcom Dad's Army, but instead decides to repeat the first series, because they believe many people had missed the series when it had started in the summer of 1968. The start of series 2 on BBC1 is postponed until 1 March.

=== February ===
- 28 February – ITV begins showing the sitcom On the Buses, starring Reg Varney as bus driver Stan Butler and Stephen Lewis as the inspector Blakey.

=== March ===
- 19 March – The 385-metre-tall (1,263 ft) Emley Moor transmitting station mast collapses because of ice.
- 29 March – The UK shares the win of the 14th Eurovision Song Contest (staged in Madrid) in a four-way tie with France, Spain and the Netherlands. Lulu represents the UK, singing "Boom Bang-a-Bang". It is broadcast live on BBC1.
- 31 March
  - Charles Curran becomes Director-General of the BBC.
  - Historical drama The Flashing Blade, adapted from the French original, airs on BBC1 children's television for the first time, transmitted in black and white.

=== April ===
- 11 April – Granada's eight-part crime thriller serial Big Breadwinner Hog launches on the ITV network at 9.00pm. Because of complaints, the violence is toned down in later episodes, but from episode five, some ITV regions move transmission to a later timeslot, while Southern and Anglia stop transmission of the serial altogether.
- 14 April – The comedy series The Liver Birds debuts on BBC1. The Liverpool-set series was created by Carla Lane; it will run for over a decade with a brief revival in 1996.

=== June ===
- 21 June
  - Patrick Troughton makes his last regular appearance as the Second Doctor in Episode 10 of the Doctor Who serial The War Games, with the Time Lords forcing his character to regenerate. It also marks the final time that the series is broadcast in black and white.
  - The documentary Royal Family, commissioned by the Crown and made jointly by the BBC and ITV is broadcast, initially on BBC1, and attracts more than 30.6 million viewers (three-quarters of the British public at this time), an all-time British record for a non-current-event programme. It is scripted by Antony Jay.
- June – Anglia Television and Yorkshire Television begin talks regarding a cost-cutting exercise which would involve sharing equipment and facilities. Neither company plans joint productions or a merger. The reason to form an association is purely down to the costs of the increased levy on the companies' advertising revenue by the government and the cost of colour TV. The ITA states there is no reason why the companies should not have talks about sensible economies that could be made, but would examine all details before any association were to be implemented.

=== July ===
- 3 July – Lulu the elephant runs amok on Blue Peter. The clip is subsequently repeated many times.
- 12 July – The American sci-fi series Star Trek makes its debut on BBC1 beginning with the episode "Where No Man Has Gone Before" (filmed as the second pilot and first aired in 1966 as the third episode).
- 20–21 July – Live transmission from the Moon with the landing of Apollo 11; at 03:56 BST on 21 July, Neil Armstrong steps onto the surface. BBC television makes its first overnight broadcast to provide coverage. Footage of the event is reported to have been seen by 22 million viewers on 21 July.
- 23 July – First edition of the snooker series Pot Black, which is used by BBC2 controller David Attenborough as a good way to showcase the BBC's colour television service. The series is hosted by Keith Macklin in this first series, who is replaced by Alan Weeks for the next and for many years and commentated by Ted Lowe. This edition is an introduction of the game and players for this competition; the first match, between John Spencer and Jack Rea, is transmitted a week later.
- 27 July – First episode of The Morecambe & Wise Show, Series Two, on BBC2, the first scripted by Eddie Braben.

=== September ===
- 1 September – Where Were You On the Day War Broke Out? is a documentary covering the BBC's cessation of television broadcasts on the outbreak of World War II.
- 2 September – Release of The Stones in the Park, footage of a Rolling Stones concert given in London's Hyde Park in July and filmed by Granada Television.
- 21 September – Randall and Hopkirk (Deceased) premieres on ITV.
- 23 September – BBC2 show the TV movie Prescription: Murder, which sees the first appearance of the American detective Columbo, played by Peter Falk.
- 28 September – Debut of the American police drama Hawaii Five-O on ITV Yorkshire. ITV Midlands and London regions broadcast the first episode a few days later on 3 October.

=== October ===
- 4 October – The ITV Seven, a programme which shows live coverage of horse racing from racecourses around the country, is first aired. The programme is an essential part of ITV's Saturday afternoon World of Sport show and continues until a few weeks before World of Sport ends in 1985.
- 5 October – The influential and surreal comedy sketch series Monty Python's Flying Circus airs its first episode on BBC1.
- 6 October – Chigley becomes the third and final programme of The Trumptonshire Trilogy on BBC1 to be shot in colour before the introduction of regular colour broadcasting on 15 November. Chigley also becomes the first programme on the BBC to feature the copyright year in roman numerals in the credits (MCMLXIX) prior to other regular BBC programmes from 1976 (MCMLXXVI) to the present day.
- 7 October – The Hanna Barbara children's cartoon series Wacky Races debuts on BBC1.

=== November ===
- 3 November – ITV airs the first edition of Coronation Street to be videotaped in colour, though it includes black-and-white inserts and titles; because colour transmissions have not yet officially begun (except for testing), most viewers will see it only in black-and-white. The 29 October episode, featuring a coach trip to the Lake District, had been scheduled for colour shooting, but suitable colour film stock could not be found so it was filmed in black-and-white.
- 15 November – National colour broadcasting commences on both BBC1 (following BBC2, who carried out the first UK colour broadcast on 1 July 1967 and launched a full colour service on 2 December 1967) and ITV (starting with London Weekend, ATV, Granada and Yorkshire). BBC1 launches their colour programmes with a concert by Petula Clark from the Royal Albert Hall at midnight on 14–15 November. Also, the first colour television advert, on ATV (Midlands), is for Birds Eye Peas, who paid £23 for the 30-second advert.
- 16 November – The first episode of Clangers, a stop-motion animated programme for children, is broadcast on BBC1.
- 17 November – Thames Television becomes the fifth ITV franchise to launch a colour television service.
- 19 November – A new series of The Benny Hill Show premieres on ITV. Produced by Thames Television it becomes one of the most watched programmes on British television and runs until 1986. At its peak (in 1979) it reaches an audience of over 20 million viewers.
- 20 November – The first episode of BBC sitcom Dad's Army to be broadcast in colour is "Branded", which is the favourite episode of co-writer Jimmy Perry.
- 21 November – The London Weekend Television comedy Curry and Chips, starring Spike Milligan, begins airing. The programme is the first LWT comedy to have been broadcast in colour. It is pulled off air after six episodes following a ruling by the ITA that it is racist.
- 24 November – Coronation Street is first officially transmitted in colour, according to its archivist Daran Little, but the 17 November episode may have been the first.

=== December ===
- 7 December – The "Dead Parrot sketch" (or "Pet Shop sketch") is first performed in Monty Python's Flying Circus 8th episode, performed by John Cleese and Michael Palin, and written by Cleese and Graham Chapman.
- 13 December
  - Scottish Television starts broadcasting in colour from the Black Hill transmitter.
  - Southern Television starts broadcasting in colour from the transmitters of Rowridge and Dover.
- 20 December – The 1954 Christmas film White Christmas is shown on British television for the first time on BBC1.
- 24 December – ITV show the first of several Carry On Christmas Specials, featuring familiar faces from the film series.
- 25 December
  - BBC1 debuts Morecambe & Wise's long-running annual Christmas Day special The Morecambe & Wise Christmas Show.
  - There is no televised Royal Christmas Message due to BBC1 and BBC2 simultaneously repeating the Royal Family film, avoiding the possibility of over-exposure; a statement assures return to tradition in the following year.

=== Unknown ===
- "Soul Limbo" by Booker T. & the M.G.'s becomes the new theme tune for the BBC's cricket coverage.

== Debuts ==
=== BBC1 ===
- 2 January – Holiday (1969–2007)
- 14 January – Scobie in September (1969)
- 14 April – The Liver Birds (1969, 1971–1979, 1996)
- 5 April – As Good Cooks Go (1969–1970)
- 20 April – The Elusive Pimpernel (1969)
- 22 April – The Prior Commitment (1969)
- 12 July – Star Trek (1966–1969)
- 17 August – Dombey and Son (1969)
- 8 September – Counterstrike (1969)
- 9 September
  - Decidedly Dusty (1969)
  - Nationwide (1969–1983)
- 17 September – Up Pompeii! (1969–1970; 1975, 1991)
- 22 September – A Handful of Thieves (1969)
- 5 October – Monty Python's Flying Circus (1969–1974)
- 6 October – The Trumptonshire Trilogy: Chigley (1969)
- 7 October
  - Mary, Mungo and Midge (1969)
  - Wacky Races (1968–1969)
- 16 November
  - Clangers (1969–1974, 2015–present)
  - Special Project Air (1969)
- 17 November
  - Pegasus (1969)
  - Take Three Girls (1969–1971)
- 19 November – The Doctors (1969–1971)
- 20 November – Softly, Softly: Task Force (1969–1976)
- 23 November – Paul Temple (1969–1971)
- 15 December – The Battle of St George Without (1969)

=== BBC2 ===
- 25 January – The Possessed (1969)
- 17 February – The High Chaparral (1967–1971)
- 27 January – Where Was Spring? (1969–1970)
- 23 February – Civilisation (1969)
- 8 March – Imperial Palace (1969)
- 14 March – Q (1969–1982)
- 5 April – The Way We Live Now (1969)
- 10 May – Sinister Street (1969)
- 12 May – The Gnomes of Dulwich (1969)
- 3 June – W. Somerset Maugham (1969–1970)
- 23 July – Pot Black (1969–1986, 1990–1993, 2005–2008)
- 6 September – Review (1969–1972) (Art & Anthology series)
- 18 September – Plays of Today (1969)
- 27 September – The First Churchills (1969)
- 23 October – Canterbury Tales (1969)

=== ITV ===
- 1 January – The Life and Times of Lord Mountbatten (1969)
- 3 January – Spider-Man (1967–1970)
- 6 January – Mr. Digby Darling (1969–1971)
- 7 January – Junior Showtime (1969–1974)
- 10 January
  - The Corbett Follies (1969)
  - The Fossett Saga (1969)
- 11 January – ITV Saturday Night Theatre (1969–1974)
- 12 January – Complete and Utter History of Britain (1969)
- 17 January – The Inside Man (1969)
- 18 January – The Saturday Crowd (1969)
- 9 February – This Is Tom Jones (1969–1971)
- 18 February – Two in Clover (1969–1970)
- 28 February – On the Buses (1969–1973)
- 9 March – Department S (1969–1970)
- 3 April – John Browne's Body (1969)
- 4 April – Castle Haven (1969–1970)
- 8 April – Judge Dee (1969)
- 11 April
  - Big Breadwinner Hog (1969)
  - Hark at Barker (1969–1970)
- 15 April – Jokers Wild (1969–1974)
- 19 April – Galton and Simpson Comedy (1969)
- 23 April – The Mind of Mr. J.G. Reeder (1969–1971)
- 30 April – Sez Les (1969–1976)
- 20 May – Fraud Squad (1969–1970)
- 21 May – The Tingaree Affair (1969)
- 6 June – The Gold Robbers (1969)
- 18 June – The Main Chance (1969–1975)
- 3 July – Join Jim Dale (1969)
- 10 July – The Incredible Adventures of Professor Branestawm (1969)
- 12 July – Doctor in the House (1969–1970)
- 12 August – The Best Things in Life (1969–1970)
- 17 August – Stars on Sunday (1969–1979)
- 19 August – Who-Dun-It (1969)
- 5 September – The Contenders (1969)
- 15 September – Dear Mother...Love Albert' (1969–1972)
- 16 September – Hadleigh (1969–1976)
- 17 September – Special Branch (1969–1974)
- 19 September – Parkin's Patch (1969–1970)
- 21 September
  - The Flaxton Boys (1969–1973)
  - Randall and Hopkirk (Deceased) (1969–1970)
  - The Secret Service (1969)
  - Strange Report (1969–1970)
- 23 September – The Dustbinmen (1969–1970)
- 28 September – Hawaii Five-O (1968–1980)
- 2 October – Girls About Town (1969–1971)
- 4 October – ITV Racing (1969–1985, 2017–present)
- 10 October – Ours Is a Nice House (1969–1970)
- 5 November – Lift Off with Ayshea (1969–1974)
- 18 November
  - Happy Ever After (1969–1970)
  - Cribbins (1969–1970)
- 19 November
  - This Is Your Life (1955–1964, 1969–2003)
  - The Benny Hill Show (1969–1989)
- 21 November – Curry and Chips (1969)
- 21 December – The Owl Service (1969–1970)
- 26 December
  - The Engelbert Humperdinck Show (1969–1970)
  - It's Tommy Cooper (1969–1971)
- 30 December – A Present for Dickie (1969–1970)
- Unknown – Wheel of Fortune (1969–1971)

== Continuing television shows ==
=== 1920s ===
- BBC Wimbledon (1927–1939, 1946–2019, 2021–2024)

=== 1930s ===
- Trooping the Colour (1937–1939, 1946–2019, 2023–present)
- The Boat Race (1938–1939, 1946–2019, 2021–present)
- BBC Cricket (1939, 1946–1999, 2020–2024)

=== 1950s ===
- Andy Pandy (1950–1970, 2002–2005)
- Come Dancing (1950–1998)
- Watch with Mother (1952–1975)
- The Good Old Days (1953–1983)
- Panorama (1953–present)
- Dixon of Dock Green (1955–1976)
- Crackerjack (1955–1970, 1972–1984, 2020–2021)
- Opportunity Knocks (1956–1978, 1987–1990)
- This Week (1956–1978, 1986–1992)
- Armchair Theatre (1956–1974)
- What the Papers Say (1956–2008)
- The Sky at Night (1957–present)
- Blue Peter (1958–present)
- Grandstand (1958–2007)

=== 1960s ===
- Coronation Street (1960–present)
- Songs of Praise (1961–present)
- Z-Cars (1962–1978)
- Animal Magic (1962–1983)
- Doctor Who (1963–1989, 1996, 2005–present)
- World in Action (1963–1998)
- The Wednesday Play (1964–1970)
- Top of the Pops (1964–2006)
- Match of the Day (1964–present)
- Crossroads (1964–1988, 2001–2003)
- Play School (1964–1988)
- Mr. and Mrs. (1965–1999)
- Not Only... But Also (1965–1970)
- World of Sport (1965–1985)
- Sportsnight (1965–1997)
- All Gas and Gaiters (1966–1971)
- Jackanory (1965–1996, 2006)
- It's a Knockout (1966–1982, 1999–2001)
- The Money Programme (1966–2010)
- Not in Front of the Children (1967–1970)
- Never Mind the Quality, Feel the Width (1967–1971)
- Callan (1967–1972)
- The Golden Shot (1967–1975)
- Playhouse (1967–1982)
- Me Mammy (1968–1971)
- Please Sir! (1968–1972)
- Father, Dear Father (1968–1973)
- Dad's Army (1968–1977)
- Magpie (1968–1980)
- The Morecambe & Wise Show (1968–1977, 1978–1983)
- The Big Match (1968–2002)

== Ending this year ==
- 9 February – The Saint (1962–1969)
- 30 April – The Champions (1968–1969)
- 14 May – Do Not Adjust Your Set (1967–1969)
- 21 May – The Avengers (1961–1969)
- 13 November – Softly, Softly (1966–1969)
- 28 November – The Newcomers (1965–1969)
- 26 December – Curry and Chips (1969)
- 29 December – The Trumptonshire Trilogy (1966–1969)
- Unknown
  - Market in Honey Lane (1967–1969)
  - Journey to the Unknown (1968–1969)
  - Strange Report (1968–1969)

== Births ==
- 21 January – Hardeep Singh Kohli, comedian, writer and television presenter
- 22 January – Olivia d'Abo, English actress
- 17 March – Cally Beaton, comedian and television executive
- 23 March – Richard Cadell, children's television presenter and magician (Sooty)
- 4 April – Karren Brady, sporting executive, television broadcaster, newspaper columnist, author and novelist
- 27 April – Tess Daly, British television presenter.
- 15 May – Craig Oliver, journalist, television media executive and government special adviser
- 10 June – Jane Hill, journalist and newsreader
- 20 July – Gillian Joseph, newscaster
- 31 July – Ben Chaplin, actor
- 21 August – Julie Etchingham, journalist and newsreader
- 27 August – Reece Shearsmith, English actor, writer and comedian (The League of Gentlemen)
- 25 September – Catherine Zeta-Jones, Welsh actress
- 2 October – Natasha Little, actress
- 5 October – Andrea McLean, television presenter
- 16 October – Suzanne Virdee, newsreader on Midlands Today
- 13 November – Gerard Butler, Scottish actor
- 5 December – Catherine Tate, comedian and actress
- 19 December – Richard Hammond, British TV presenter

== Deaths ==
- 25 March – Billy Cotton, entertainer & bandleader (Wakey Wakey Tavern), aged 69

== See also ==
- 1969 in British music
- 1969 in British radio
- 1969 in the United Kingdom
- List of British films of 1969
