= Stars and Garters =

British TV variety series (1963–1966)

Stars and Garters is a British television variety show produced by Associated-Rediffusion from 1963 until 1966, set in a fictional public house. Hosted by comedian Ray Martine, regulars included singers Kathy Kirby, Vince Hill, Tommy Bruce, Al Saxon, Clinton Ford and Julie Rayne. Readers of Weekend magazine voted the show the Best TV Series of 1963.

Martine left the show in October 1965, after which it was renamed The New Stars and Garters and hosted by Jill Browne and Willie Rushton.

The Don Harvey Trio were the accompaniment band for the singers in this show, in The Rising Sun public house in London, when it was aired there.
