= Jokers Wild (TV series) =

British TV comedy game show (1969–1974)

- Genre: Comedy panel game
- Created by: Ray Cameron; Mike King
- Presented by: Barry Cryer with Isabella Rye; Michael Bentine
- Starring: Ted Ray; Arthur Askey; Les Dawson; Ray Martine
- Country of origin: United Kingdom
- Original language: English
- No. of series: 9
- No. of episodes: 169

Production
- Running time: 30 minutes (inc. adverts)
- Production company: Yorkshire Television

Original release
- Network: ITV
- Release: 9 July 1969 – 20 November 1974

Jokers Wild is a British comedy panel game show hosted by Barry Cryer. It originally aired on ITV from 9 July 1969 to 20 November 1974. The show was based on two American panel game shows: Stop Me If You've Heard This One and Can You Top This?.

== Format and performers ==
Each week two teams of three comedians each played for points by telling jokes on a certain subject chosen by the host, who would pull the selection from a box on his desk. Typical examples were politics or the mother-in-law. When a member of a team was telling a joke, a member of the other team could interrupt the joke by pressing the buzzer and finishing the joke to score bonus points for his/her team. The turn did not end, however, until the comedian whose proper turn it was finished a joke with a punchline.

Before the commercial break one of the comedians would be given one minute to get as many laughs as possible from the studio audience. The more laughs, the more points were scored. At the end of the show the team with the most points won a gag trophy of a jester carrying the Yorkshire Television chevron logo.

In each team of three, two of the comedians were regular contestants; the third was a guest comedian. Guest comedians regularly appeared for two shows in succession before new guests appeared. For much of the run of the series, Ted Ray and Arthur Askey served as team captains, usually regularly supported by Ray Martine and Les Dawson respectively. Some of the other comedians who appeared on the show, either as guests or as temporary team captains or regular contestants, were Jon Pertwee, John Cleese, Rolf Harris, Ted Rogers, Norman Collier, Chic Murray, Alfred Marks, Lance Percival, Charlie Chester, Tim Brooke-Taylor, Sid James and Jack Douglas. Series co-creator, and father of comic Michael McIntyre, Ray Cameron, appeared as a panellist on several episodes in the first series.

In the first series, compère Barry Cryer was joined by an assistant, although her role in the show was very limited and the idea of an assistant was dropped after a handful of episodes. Points were awarded on an arbitrary basis by Cryer (sometimes with help from the studio audience). In early series, jokes scored either five or ten points each. In later series, any number of points up to ten could be awarded. The system of points scoring was, by and large, not a major factor in the show in any case, but simply a way to suggest competitiveness between the comedians.

== Transmissions ==
=== Series ===
Series	Start date	End date	Episodes
1	9 July 1969	12 November 1969	19
2	31 March 1970	8 July 1970	14
3	15 July 1970	9 September 1970	9
4	16 September 1970	11 November 1970	9
5	19 May 1971	11 August 1971	13
6	18 August 1971	10 November 1971	13
7	17 May 1972	26 July 1972	11
8	19 October 1972	16 April 1973	27
9	17 May 1973	20 November 1974	52

=== Specials ===
Date	Entitle
26 December 1972	Christmas Special
24 December 1973	Christmas Special

'Rewind TV' began showing Series 1 in July 2025.

== DVD releases ==
The first two series of Jokers Wild have been released on DVD by Network.

DVD title	Discs	Year	Episodes	Release date
Complete Series 1	3	1969	19 (+ non-broadcast pilot)	31 January 2011
Complete Series 2	2	1970	14	14 November 2011
