= Croydon Road Recreation Ground =

Public park in Beckenham

Coordinates: 51.4037°N 0.0329°W

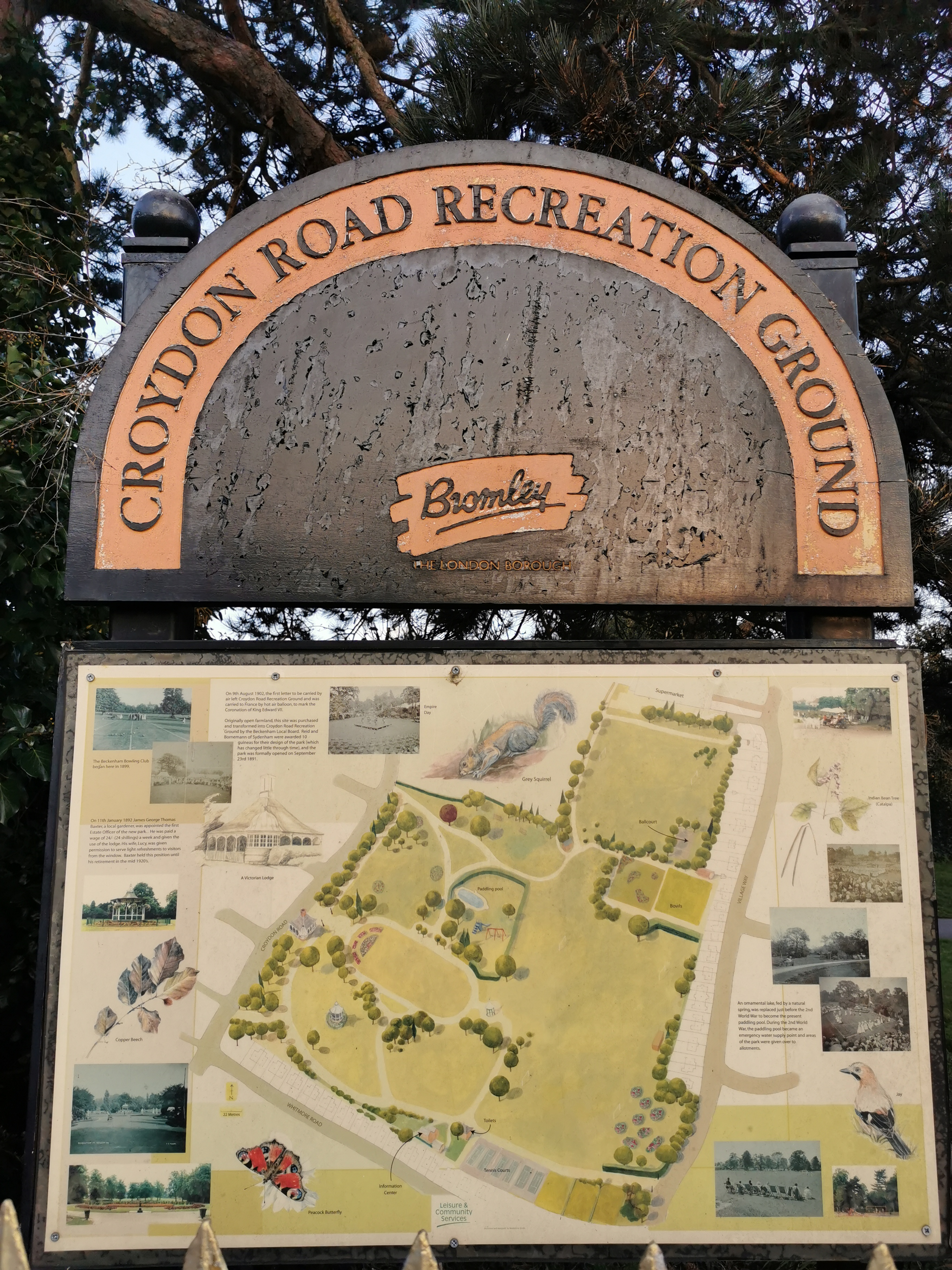
Information board by main entrance

Croydon Road Recreation Ground is a public park in Beckenham in the London Borough of Bromley. It is near the High St and adjacent to Beckenham Beacon. The park features a café and bandstand, as well as a bowling green and other sports facilities. The park was laid out by the Sydenham firm Reid and Bornemann in 1890 and was formally opened on 23 September 1891.

The UK's first manned airmail flight left from here in 1902, travelling to Calais by hot air balloon The event was held to celebrate the coronation of King Edward VII. The crew were A E Gaudron, a French balloonist and Dr. Barton, a local medical practitioner. Mail was dropped at three points in Kent before the balloon itself then crossed the Channel before landing near Calais.

On 16 August 1969 David Bowie helped organise and played at the Growth Summer Festival a one-day festival that played from the bandstand in the park. Now known as the Bowie Bandstand, it was built by the McCallum and Hope Iron Foundry of Glasgow and erected in 1905. It was listed Grade II on the National Heritage List for England in 2019 as a "rare and substantial example of cast-iron work" by the McCallum and Hope Iron Foundry, and for its association with Bowie. On 15 September 2013, the park hosted a "Memory of a Free Festival" event, commemorating the 1969 festival.

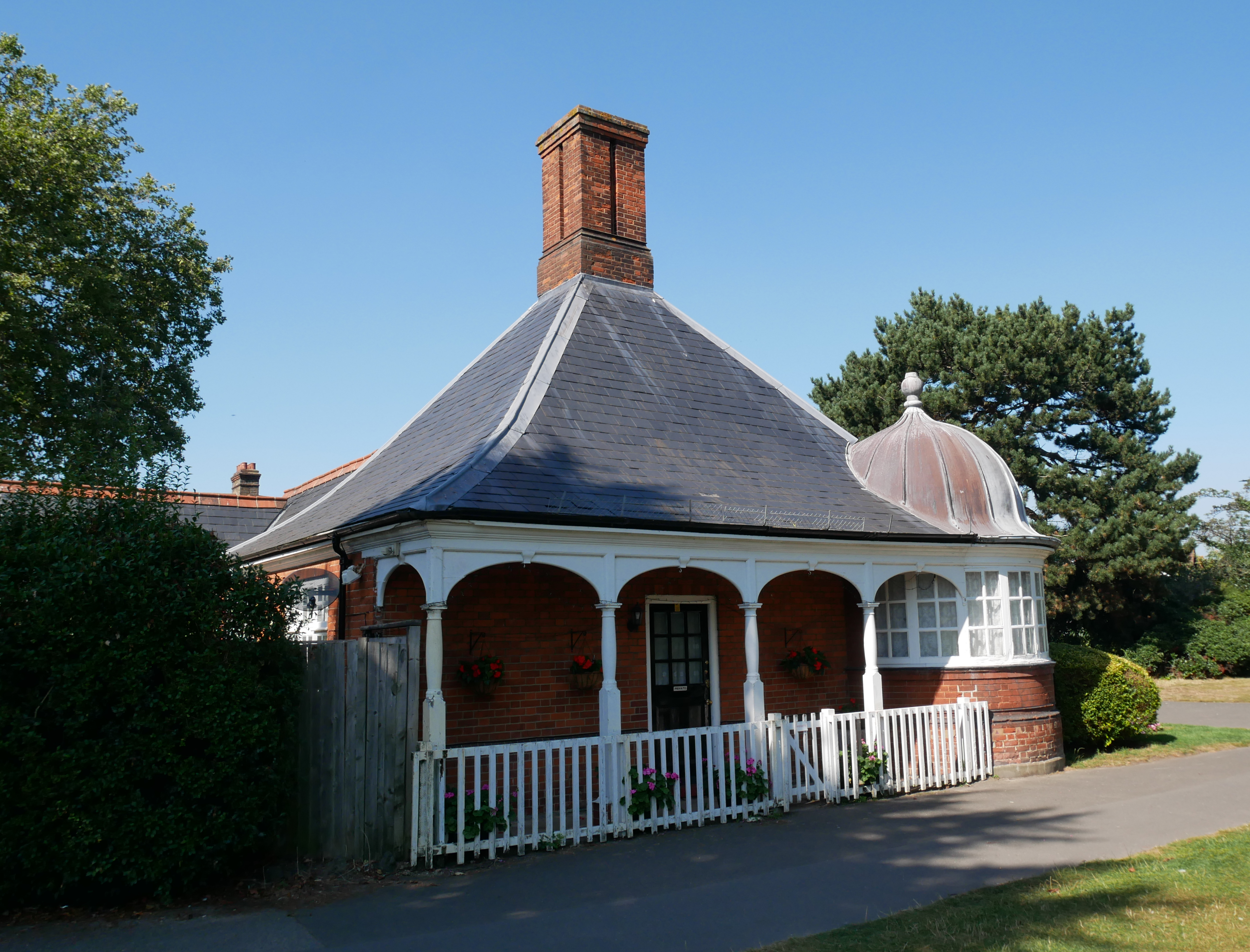
Victorian gate lodge, part of a Grade II–listed structure

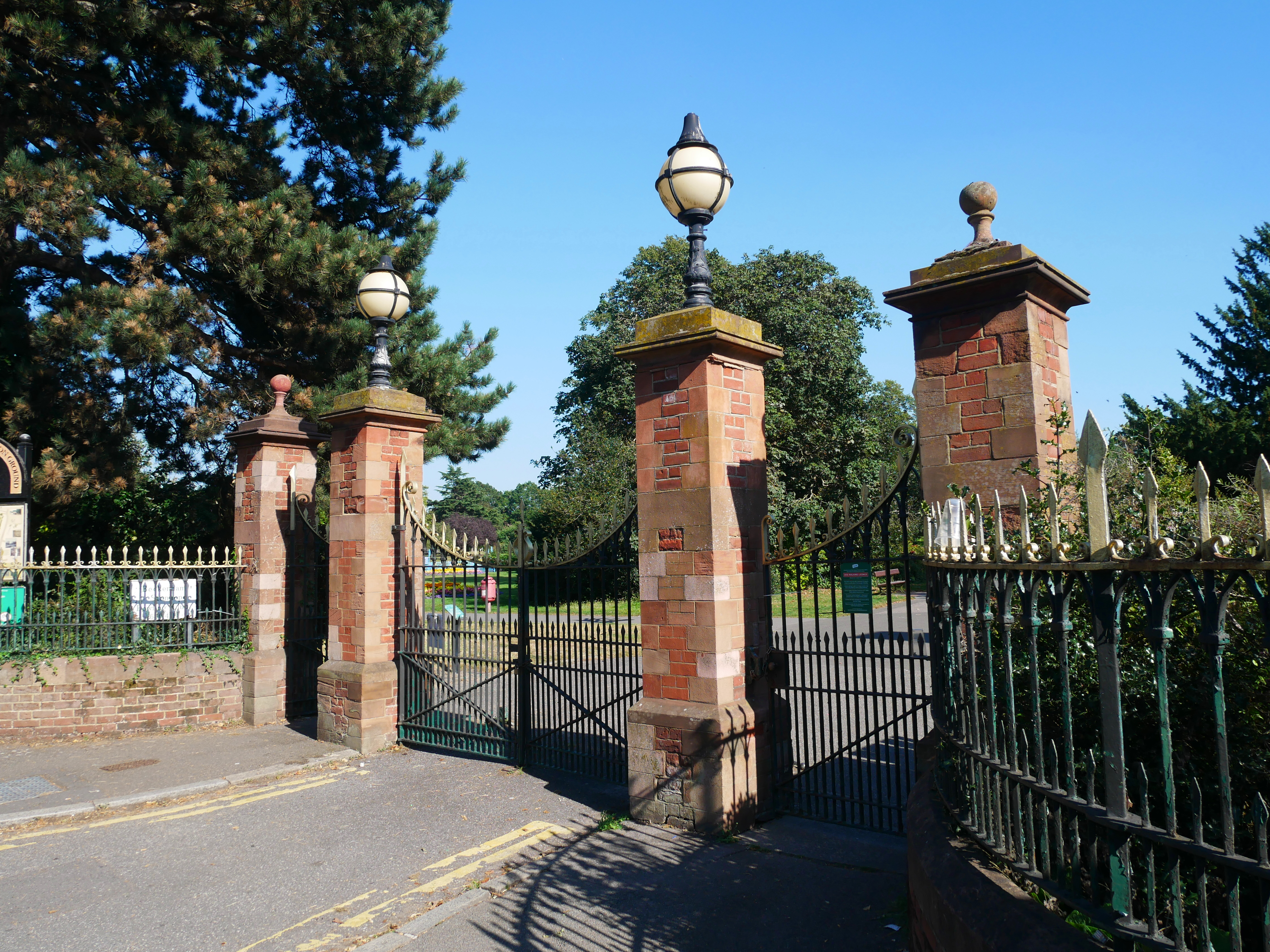
Western entrance gate, listed as Grade II with the lodge

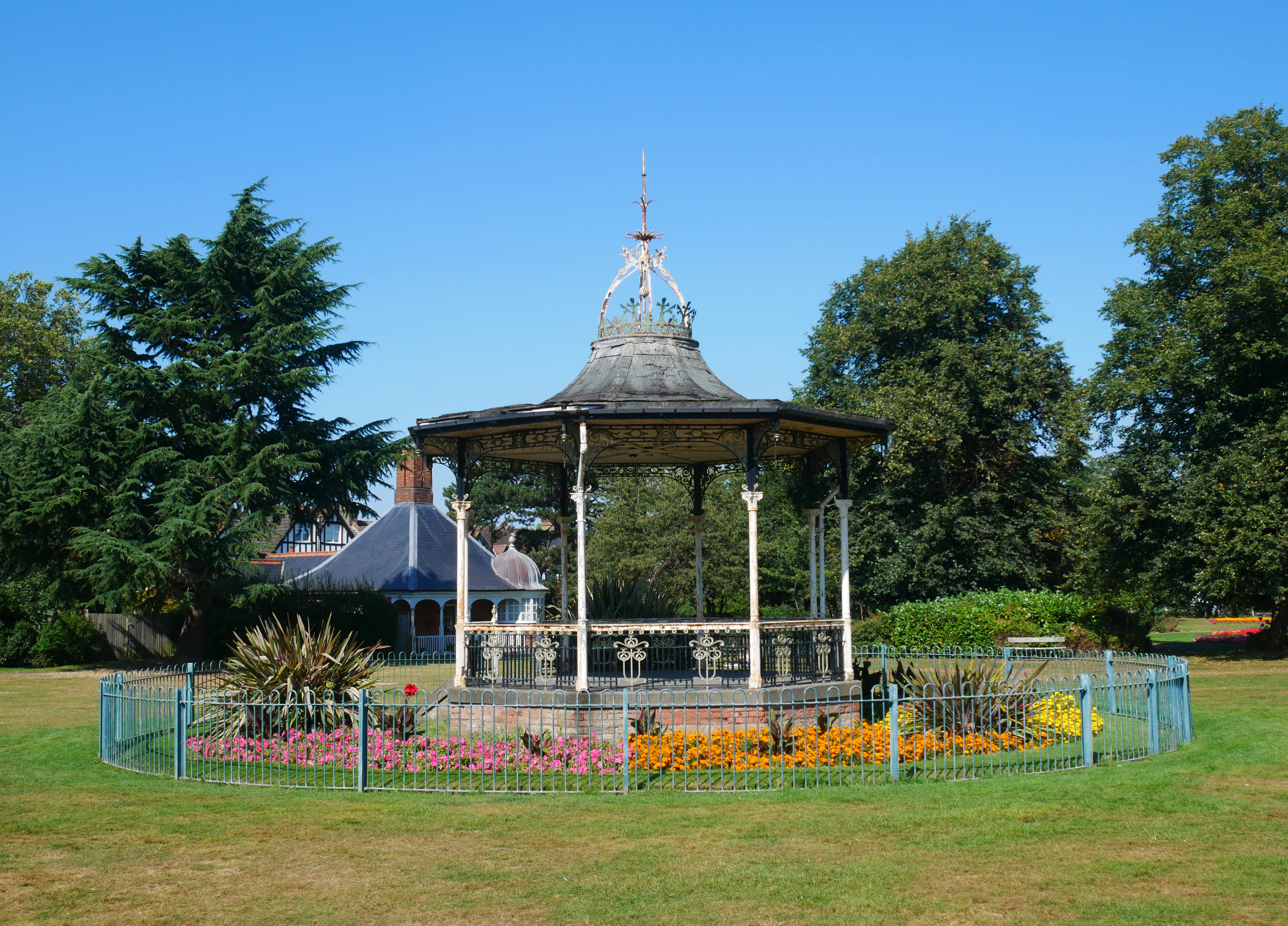
Bowie Bandstand, separately Grade II–listed

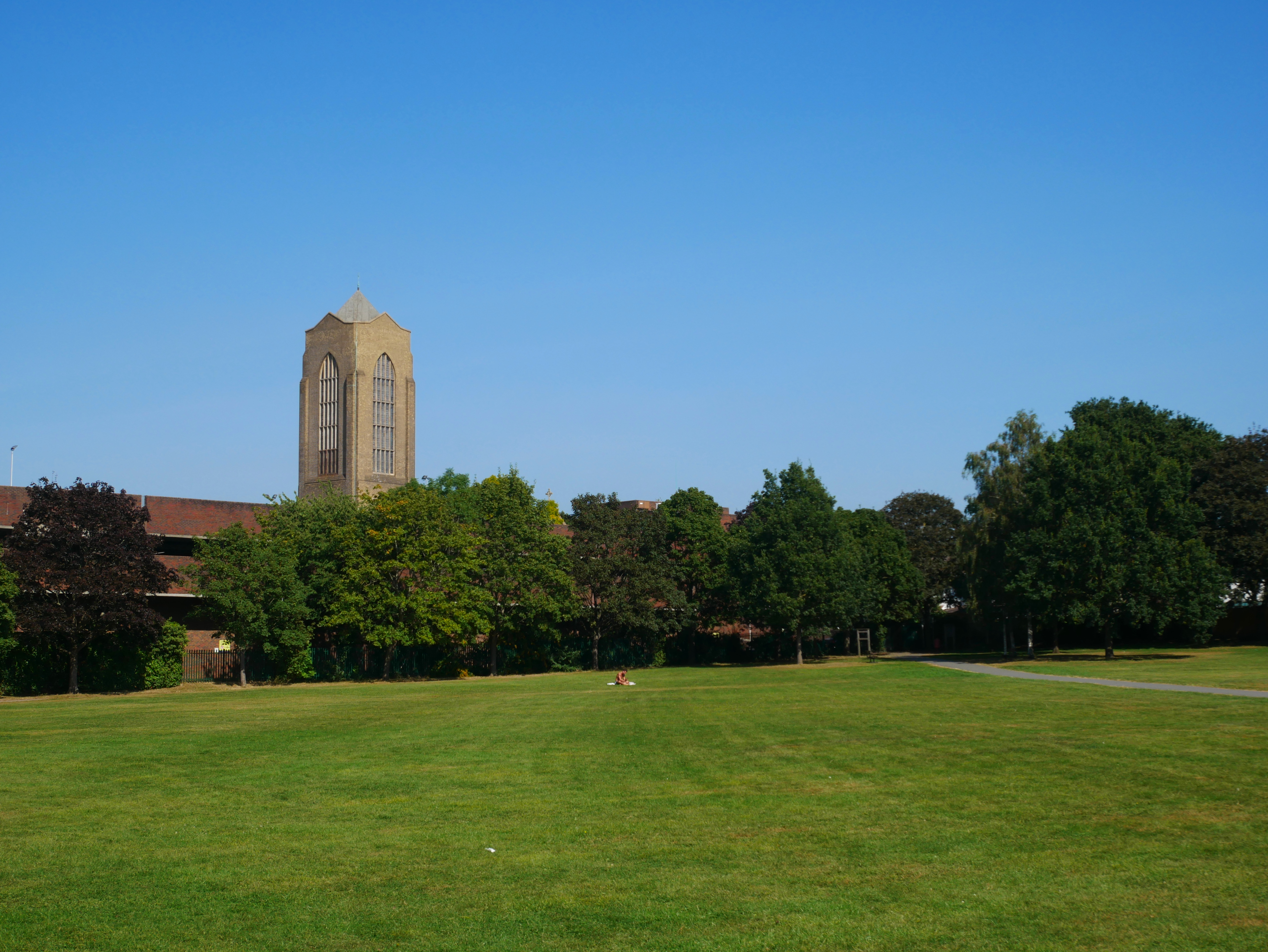
North field with tower of St. Edmund of Canterbury church

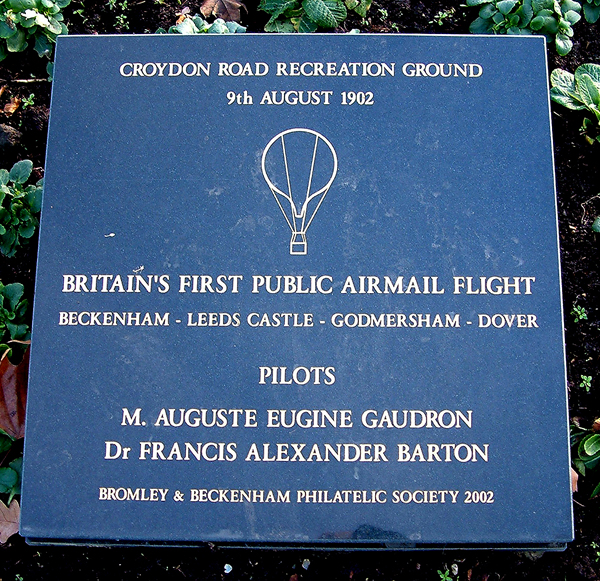
Plaque commemorating airmail balloon flight
