= List of British films of 1969 =

A list of films produced in the United Kingdom in 1969 (see 1969 in film):

== 1969 ==
Title	Director	Cast	Genre	Notes
1969
The Adding Machine	Jerome Epstein	Milo O'Shea, Phyllis Diller, Billie Whitelaw	Drama	
Alfred the Great	Clive Donner	David Hemmings, Michael York, Colin Blakely	Historical	
Anne of the Thousand Days	Charles Jarrott	Richard Burton, Geneviève Bujold, Anthony Quayle	Historical	Academy Award winner
The Assassination Bureau	Basil Dearden	Oliver Reed, Diana Rigg, Curt Jürgens	Adventure comedy	
Battle of Britain	Guy Hamilton	Laurence Olivier, Trevor Howard, Robert Shaw	World War II	
The Bed Sitting Room	Richard Lester	Rita Tushingham, Dudley Moore, Arthur Lowe	Comedy	
Before Winter Comes	J. Lee Thompson	David Niven, Chaim Topol, Anna Karina	Drama	
The Best House in London	Philip Saville	David Hemmings, Joanna Pettet, George Sanders	Comedy	
The Body Stealers	Gerry Levy	George Sanders, Maurice Evans, Patrick Allen	Sci-fi	
Bronco Bullfrog	Barney Platts-Mills	Del Walker, Anne Gooding	Drama	
Can Heironymus Merkin Ever Forget Mercy Humppe and Find True Happiness?	Anthony Newley	Anthony Newley, Connie Kreski, Joan Collins	Comedy	
Captain Nemo and the Underwater City	James Hill	Robert Ryan, Chuck Connors, Nanette Newman	Fantasy	Based on novel by Jules Verne
Carry On Again Doctor	Gerald Thomas	Kenneth Williams, Sid James, Jim Dale	Comedy	
Carry On Camping	Gerald Thomas	Sid James, Kenneth Williams, Barbara Windsor	Comedy	
The Chairman	J. Lee Thompson	Gregory Peck, Anne Heywood, Alan Dobie	Thriller	
Crooks and Coronets	Jim O'Connolly	Telly Savalas, Edith Evans, Cesar Romero	Comedy	
Crossplot	Alvin Rakoff	Roger Moore, Claudie Lange, Martha Hyer	Thriller	
Dance of Death	David Giles	Laurence Olivier, Geraldine McEwan, Robert Lang	Drama	
David Copperfield	Delbert Mann	Richard Attenborough, Laurence Olivier, Robin Phillips	Drama	
Doppelgänger	Robert Parrish	Roy Thinnes, Ian Hendry, Herbert London	Sci-fi	
The File of the Golden Goose	Sam Wanamaker	Yul Brynner, Charles Gray, Edward Woodward	Thriller	
Frankenstein Must Be Destroyed	Terence Fisher	Peter Cushing, Veronica Carlson, Simon Ward	Horror	
Guns in the Heather	Robert Butler	Glenn Corbett, Alfred Burke	Family	Co-production with the US
Hamlet	Tony Richardson	Nicol Williamson, Anthony Hopkins	Literary drama	Adaptation of Shakespeare's play
Hannibal Brooks	Michael Winner	Oliver Reed, Michael J Pollard	World War II	
The Haunted House of Horror	Michael Armstrong	Frankie Avalon, Jill Haworth	Horror	
I Start Counting	David Greene	Jenny Agutter, Bryan Marshall	Thriller	
In Search of Gregory	Peter Wood	Julie Christie, Michael Sarrazin	Romance	
The Italian Job	Peter Collinson	Michael Caine, Noël Coward, Benny Hill	Action/comedy	Number 36 in the list of BFI Top 100 British films
Kes	Ken Loach	David Bradley, Lynne Perrie	Drama	Number 7 in the list of BFI Top 100 British films
The Last Shot You Hear	Gordon Hessler	Hugh Marlowe, Zena Walker	Thriller	
Laughter in the Dark	Tony Richardson	Nicol Williamson, Anna Karina	Drama	Co-production with France
Lock Up Your Daughters!	Peter Coe	Christopher Plummer, Susannah York	Comedy	
Lola (Twinky)	Richard Donner	Charles Bronson, Susan George	Comedy	
The Magic Christian	Joseph McGrath	Ringo Starr, Peter Sellers	Comedy	
Man of Violence	Pete Walker	Michael Latimer, Luan Peters	Crime	
Monte Carlo or Bust!	Ken Annakin	Terry-Thomas, Tony Curtis	Comedy	Co-production with France & Italy
Moon Zero Two	Roy Ward Baker	James Olson, Catherine Schell	Sci-fi	
Mosquito Squadron	Boris Sagal	David McCallum, Suzanne Neve, Charles Gray	World War II	
Mumsy, Nanny, Sonny and Girly	Freddie Francis	Ursula Howells, Pat Heywood, Vanessa Howard	Horror comedy	
A Nice Girl Like Me	Desmond Davis	Barbara Ferris, Harry Andrews, Gladys Cooper	Comedy	
Night After Night After Night	Lindsay Shonteff	Jack May, Justine Lord	Crime/horror	
The Oblong Box	Gordon Hessler	Vincent Price, Christopher Lee, Sally Geeson	Horror	
Oh! What a Lovely War	Richard Attenborough	John Mills, Laurence Olivier, Maggie Smith	World War I/musical	
On Her Majesty's Secret Service	Peter R. Hunt	George Lazenby, Diana Rigg, Telly Savalas	Spy/action	
Play Dirty	André de Toth	Michael Caine, Nigel Green	World War II	Filmed in Spain
The Prime of Miss Jean Brodie	Ronald Neame	Maggie Smith, Robert Stephens, Pamela Franklin	Drama	Maggie Smith won the Academy Award for best actress in a leading role.
The Promise	Michael Hayes	John Castle, Ian McKellen	Drama	
A Promise of Bed	Derek Ford	Victor Spinetti, Vanessa Howard	Comedy	
The Reckoning	Jack Gold	Nicol Williamson, Ann Bell	Drama	
Rhubarb	Eric Sykes	Eric Sykes, Harry Secombe	Comedy	Short film
Ring of Bright Water	Jack Couffer	Bill Travers, Virginia McKenna	Drama	
The Royal Hunt of the Sun	Irving Lerner	Robert Shaw, Christopher Plummer	Adventure	
Run Wild, Run Free	Richard C. Sarafian	John Mills, Mark Lester	Family	
Sandy the Seal	Robert Lynn	Heinz Drache, Marianne Koch	Family	Filmed in South Africa in 1965
School for Sex	Pete Walker	Rose Alba, Hugh Latimer, Françoise Pascal	Sex comedy	
Sinful Davey	John Huston	John Hurt, Pamela Franklin	Comedy	
The Smashing Bird I Used to Know	Robert Hartford-Davis	Maureen Lipman, Dennis Waterman, Patrick Mower	Drama	
Some Girls Do	Ralph Thomas	Richard Johnson, Daliah Lavi	Spy	
The Southern Star	Sidney Hayers	George Segal, Ursula Andress	Adventure	Co-production with France
Staircase	Stanley Donen	Rex Harrison, Richard Burton	Drama	Co-production with the United States
A Talent for Loving	Richard Quine	Richard Widmark, Topol, Geneviève Page	Comedy/western	Co-production with the United States
Taste the Blood of Dracula	Peter Sasdy	Christopher Lee, Geoffrey Keen, Gwen Watford	Horror	
Three Into Two Won't Go	Peter Hall	Rod Steiger, Claire Bloom, Judy Geeson	Drama	Entered into the 19th Berlin International Film Festival
Till Death Us Do Part	Norman Cohen	Warren Mitchell; Dandy Nichols	Comedy	
A Touch of Love	Waris Hussein	Sandy Dennis; Ian McKellen	Drama	Entered into the 19th Berlin International Film Festival
Twenty-Nine	Brian Cummins	Alexis Kanner, Susan Hunt, Robert Lang, Justine Lord	Drama	Short film
Two Gentlemen Sharing	Ted Kotcheff	Robin Phillips, Judy Geeson, Esther Anderson	Drama	
The Virgin Soldiers	John Dexter	Hywel Bennett, Nigel Patrick, Lynn Redgrave	Drama	
Walk a Crooked Path	John Brason	Tenniel Evans, Faith Brook	Crime	
What's Good for the Goose	Menahem Golan	Norman Wisdom, Sally Geeson	Comedy	
Where's Jack?	James Clavell	Stanley Baker, Tommy Steele	Crime	
Women in Love	Ken Russell	Alan Bates, Oliver Reed, Glenda Jackson, Jennie Linden	Literary drama	Adapted from the book by D H Lawrence; Number 87 in the list of BFI Top 100 British films. Glenda Jackson won the Academy Award for Best Actress.
Zeta One	Michael Cort	James Robertson Justice, Charles Hawtrey	Comedy/sci-fi	

== Most Popular Films of the Year ==
Based on survey of more than 1,600 cinemas according to Motion Picture Herald.

Top special reserved ticket attraction of the year:

- Oliver!

Top four films:

- Carry On Camping
- Carry On Up the Khyber
- The Love Bug
- Till Death Us Do Part

Next ten most successful films in general release (in alphabetical order):

- Baby Love
- Bullitt
- Candy
- Half a Sixpence
- The Italian Job
- Mayerling
- Oh! What a Lovely War
- Shalako
- 3 into 2 Won't Go
- The Virgin Soldiers

== See also ==
- 1969 in British music
- 1969 in British radio
- 1969 in British television
- 1969 in the United Kingdom
