= Bowie Bandstand =

Bandstand in Beckenham, London, England

Coordinates: 51.4035°N 0.0345°W

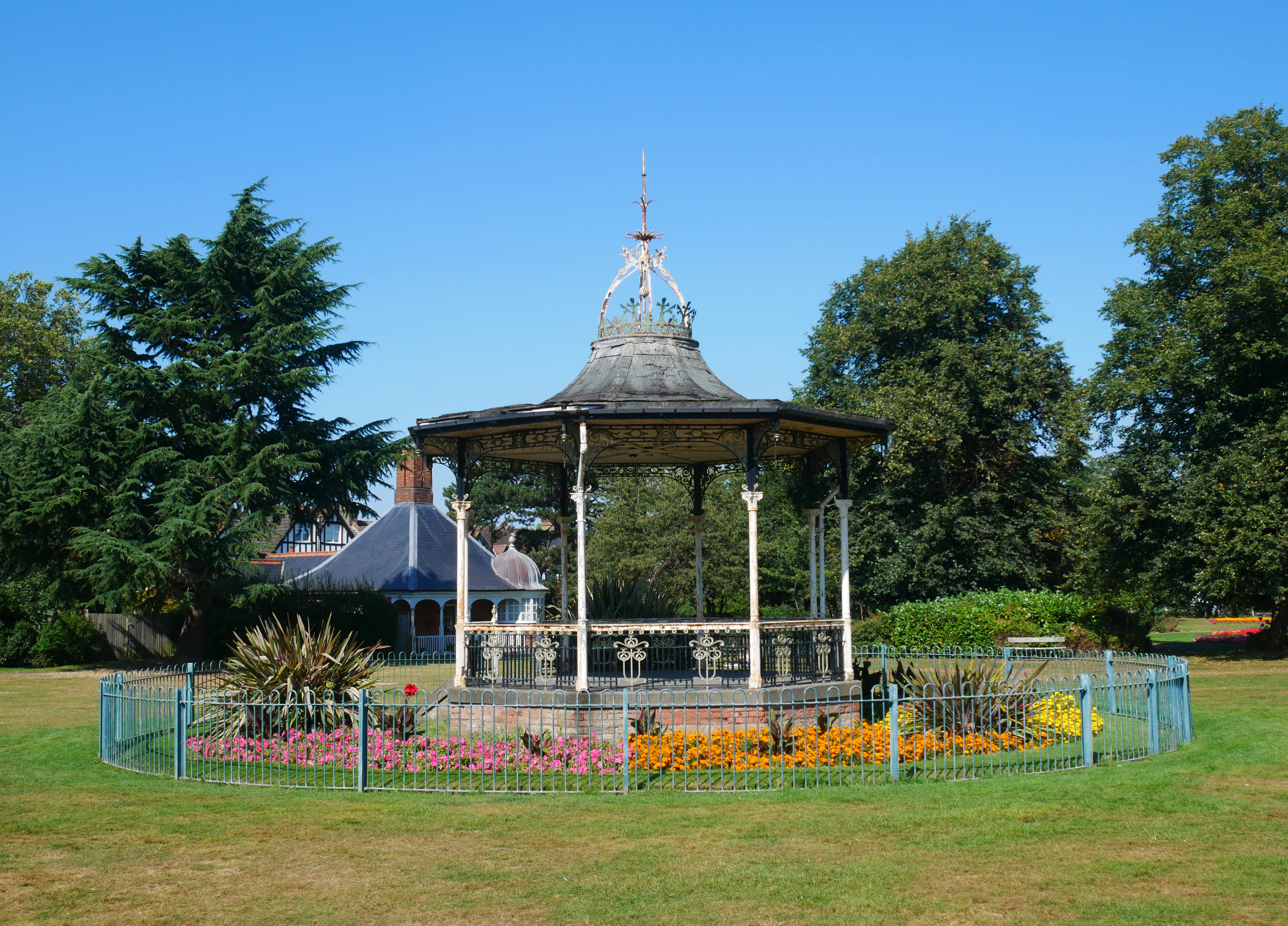
Bowie Bandstand, September 2021

The Bowie Bandstand is a listed building in Croydon Road Recreation Ground, a public park in Beckenham in the London Borough of Bromley.

The bandstand was erected in 1905, designed by the McCallum and Hope Iron Foundry, Glasgow. It is believed to be the only surviving McCallum and Hope bandstand in the UK. As of 2024, the bandstand is being restored.

On 16 August 1969, David Bowie helped organise, compere and perform at the Growth summer festival, a free music event based at the bandstand. The structure has been called the "Bowie Bandstand" by fans. A one-day festival called "Bowie's Beckenham Oddity" has been held several times in the park, celebrating Bowie's life and legacy.
