= Dr. Crock and His Crackpots =

British comedy band

Dr. Crock and His Crackpots were a British comedy band popular between the 1940s and 1960s. They were led by saxophone and clarinet player Harry Hines.

Henry Albert "Harry" Hines (born Henrick James Albert Rudolph Hinz; 9 June 1903 – 14 May 1971) was a jazz musician, born in Tottenham, London. He learned clarinet when in the Royal Navy, later learned the saxophone, and became a professional musician in 1933. In the 1930s and early 1940s, he played in various dance bands, including those of Ambrose, Ray Noble, Teddy Brown, and Maurice Winnick, and wrote arrangements.

In 1947, Winnick persuaded Hines to take over the musical interludes in the popular radio programme Ignorance Is Bliss, after Sid Millward and His Nitwits left the show. Though Hines, as a serious musician, was initially reluctant, he formed a band, which was given the name Dr Crock and His Crackpots by Winnick. They typically played classical themes at breakneck speed, interspersed with noises such as cowbells and hooters; writer Richard Anthony Baker described them as sounding "like a cross between a small symphony orchestra and a Dixieland jazz band".

Soon afterwards, when Hines wanted to leave the radio show, he took a successful legal action against Winnick, who claimed he had the legal right to use the band name. In the 1950s and early 1960s, Dr Crock and His Crackpots, with a line-up comprising both musicians and comedians, toured successfully, often topping the bill at variety shows and performing in a style similar to Spike Jones and His City Slickers.

Harry Hines died in London in 1971, aged 67.
