= Anisminic Ltd v Foreign Compensation Commission =

UK constitutional law case

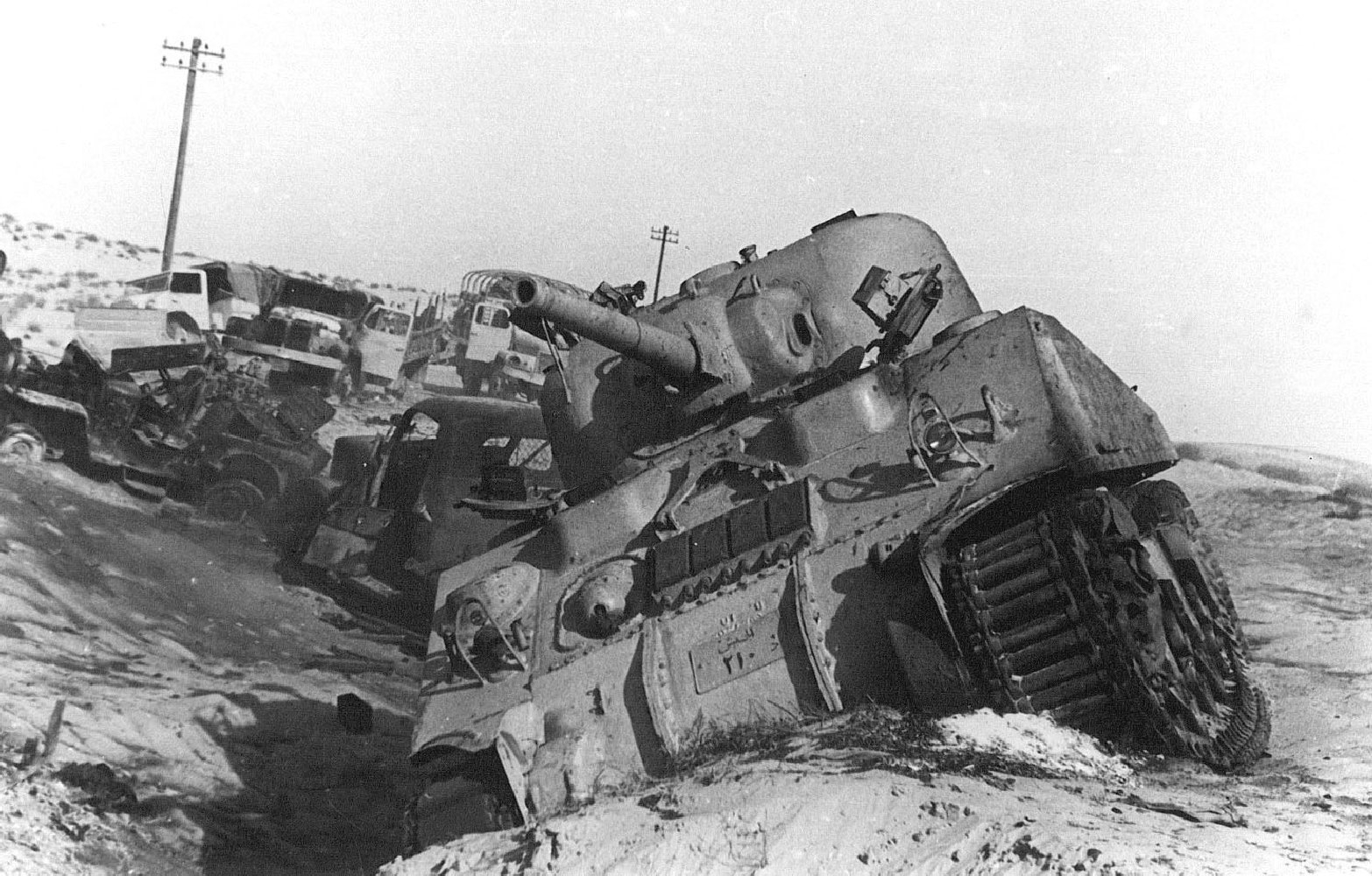
- Court: House of Lords
- Decided: 17 December 1968
- Citation: [1969] 2 AC 147, [1969] 2 WLR 163
- Transcript: BAILII Transcript

Court membership
- Judges sitting: Lord Reid, Lord Morris of Borth-y-Gest, Lord Pearce, Lord Wilberforce, Lord Pearson

Keywords
- Judicial review, Ouster clause, Error of law

Anisminic Ltd v Foreign Compensation Commission [1969] 2 AC 147 is a UK constitutional law case from the House of Lords in English administrative law. It established the "collateral fact doctrine", which states that any error of law made by a public body will make its decision a nullity and that a statutory exclusion clause (known as an ouster clause) does not deprive the courts of their jurisdiction in judicial review unless it expressly states this intention.

The case is seen as emblematic for and has fostered a wide case law on the possibility of a government to foreclose the ability for judicial review, and is mirrored in numerous cases in common law countries.

== Facts ==
As a result of the Suez Crisis some mining properties of the appellant Anisminic (renamed from Sinai Mining Co.) located in the Sinai peninsula were seized by the Egyptian government before November 1956. Anisminic then sold the mining properties to The Economic Development Organisation (TEDO), owned by the Egyptian government, in 1957.

In 1959 and 1962, Orders in Council were made under the Foreign Compensation Act 1950 (14 Geo. 6. c. 12) to distribute compensation paid by the Egyptian government to the UK government with respect to British properties it had nationalised. Anisminic claimed that they were eligible for compensation under the Orders, and the claim was determined by a tribunal (the respondents in this case) set up under the Foreign Compensation Act.

The tribunal decided that Anisminic were not eligible for compensation, because TEDO, their "successors in title", did not have British nationality, as required by the Orders.

Anisminic sought judicial review of the tribunal's decision. Anisminic were successful in the High Court (Browne J), but this decision was reversed by the Court of Appeal; Anisminic then appealed to the House of Lords.

There were two important issues. The first was whether the tribunal had made an error of law when construing the term "successor in title". The second issue, which had important implications for the law on judicial review, was whether a court's jurisdiction to review a tribunal's decision could be excluded by an "ouster clause" in the relevant legislation even if the tribunal had made an error of law. Such a clause was section 4(4) of the Foreign Compensation Act: "The determination by the commission of any application made to them under this Act shall not be called into question in any court of law."

== Judgment ==
By a 3–2 majority, the House of Lords decided that section 4(4) of the Foreign Compensation Act did not preclude a court from reviewing the tribunal's decision. It said that a court is always able to inquire whether there has actually been a "decision", meaning a legally valid decision. If there is no legally valid decision (that is, the purported decision is legally a nullity) there is no "decision" to which an ouster clause can apply. The Lords found the purported decision to be invalid (a nullity), because the tribunal had misconstrued the term "successor in title". Since the tribunal's determination that Anisminic did not qualify for compensation was null, Anisminic were entitled to a share of the compensation paid by the Egyptian government.

== Significance ==
The decision illustrates the courts' reluctance to give effect to any legislative provision that attempts to exclude their jurisdiction in judicial review. The House of Lords' decision in Anisminic marks the high-water mark of judicial resistance to ouster clauses, establishing a structural presumption that Parliament never intends to insulate a jurisdictional nullity from judicial scrutiny.

Even when such an exclusion is relatively clearly worded, the courts will hold that it does not preclude them from scrutinising the decision on an error of law and quashing it when such an error occurs. This is because under the baseline principle established in ''Anisminic'', courts treat a material error of law as going directly to jurisdiction; the resulting decision is deemed a mere jurisdictional nullity (or "non-decision") to which a statutory ouster clause cannot logically attach.

Following Anisminic, the traditional distinction between errors of law that go to jurisdiction and errors of law within jurisdiction has been effectively dismantled in English law; any material error of law by a public body renders an administrative decision ultra vires and void.
