= Collateral fact doctrine =

Doctrine in English law

The collateral fact doctrine is a doctrine in English law asserted by Diplock LJ in Anisminic Ltd v Foreign Compensation Commission. It asserts that in judicial review cases a distinction can be made between misconstruction of an enabling statute for the kind of case meant to be dealt which is a jurisdictional error and a misconstruction of the statutory description of the situation which would be an error within jurisdiction. Paul Craig has argued that this distinction is impossible to draw.

== See also ==
- Judicial review in English Law
