= Simon Taylor (artist) =

English painter

Simon Taylor is photorealist artist who graduated from Manchester Metropolitan University in 1994 with degree in Fine Art.

Since graduating he has exhibited nationally and internationally with solo exhibitions in galleries in London, Manchester, Southport and Huddersfield and group exhibitions throughout the UK, Dublin, Milan, Brussels, Utrecht, Zurich and the USA.

Taylor won the Sefton Open Art Prize in 2006 and the Winsor & Newton Painting Award at the Royal Society of British Artists Bicentennial Exhibition at the Mall Galleries in London in 2023, and was shortlisted for the UK Contemporary British Painting Prize in 2024.

== Works ==
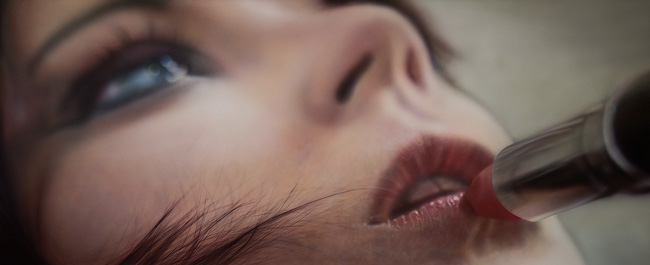
At this Moment with you. Acrylic paint on canvas. 2013

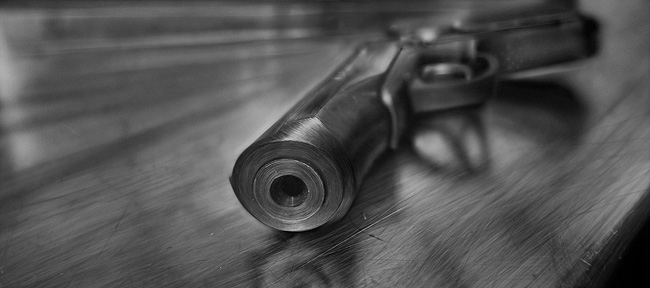
We were in this Together and then you were Gone. Acrylic paint on canvas. 2013

The Truth is... I miss you so much I can Hardly Stand It. Acrylic paint on canvas. 2013
