= Venus in Furs (1969 Franco film) =

1969 film

- Italian theatrical release poster
- Directed by: Jesús Franco
- Produced by: Harry Alan Towers
- Starring: James Darren; Maria Rohm; Klaus Kinski; Barbara McNair; Dennis Price; Paul Muller; Adolfo Lastretti; Margaret Lee
- Cinematography: Angelo Lotti
- Music by: Mike Hugg; Manfred Mann
- Production companies: Terra-Filmkunst; Cineproduzioni Associate; Commonwealth United Productions
- Distributed by: Filmar (Rome)
- Release date: 19 August 1969 (Italy)
- Running time: 92 minutes
- Countries: Italy; West Germany

Venus in Furs (Italian: Paroxismus) is a 1969 film directed by Jesús Franco. The plot involves jazz musician Jimmy Logan, who becomes obsessed with a mysterious, fur-clad Wanda, later finding her dead body washed up on the beach. The film stars James Darren, Barbara McNair, Maria Rohm, and Klaus Kinski.

The film was one of the many productions Franco had made with film producer Harry Alan Towers. While earlier material produced with Towers leaned towards more pulp-oriented material such as The Blood of Fu Manchu (1969), Venus in Furs was more related to what academic Tatiana Pavlović described as sexploitation-related material. The film began shooting on October 1, 1968, and was first screened in Italy on August 19, 1969.

When the film was released in the United States as Venus in Furs, the version varied greatly from Paroxismus, being edited by distributors at American International Pictures. This version is what is seen on most releases since. In Italy, the film prints were confiscated after Italian courts found the film in "complicity in an obscene spectacle".

== Premise ==
James Darren plays a jazz musician who becomes obsessed to the point of madness with the mysterious, fur-clad Wanda, then finds her dead body washed up on the beach.

== Cast ==
- James Darren as Jimmy Logan
- Barbara McNair as Rita, the nightclub singer
- Maria Rohm as Wanda Reed
- Klaus Kinski as Ahmed Kortobawi
- Dennis Price as Percival Kapp
- Margaret Lee as Olga, the fashion photographer
- Paul Müller as Hermann
- Adolfo Lastretti as Inspector Kaplan

The following cast went uncredited:

- Jesús Franco as jazz pianist
- Manfred Mann as jazz trombonist

== Production ==
Venus in Furs was produced by British producer Harry Alan Towers. In 1963, Towers had been producing films in Europe through multi-country co-productions giving him access to various local tax-break schemes and allowing him to take advantage of low-budget films that could easily be profitable before even an audience would see them. It was one of several productions between Towers and director Jesús Franco shot between 1967 and 1970. The film was a marked departure from the style of films they two made together, such as moving away from more pulp-oriented material of The Blood of Fu Manchu to Venus in Furs to what academic Tatiana Pavlović described as sexploitation-related material.

Franco said the idea for the film spurred from a conversation had between Franco and jazz musician Chet Baker, where Baker described a sensation of floating away from reality when he performed his trumpet solos, only to open his eyes into reality. Credits and interviews with crew members give various contradicting information on the development of Venus in Furs. Italian film prints credit Franco, Malvin Wald, Carloa Fadda, and Milo G. Cuccia for the screenplay and Guido Leoni for dialogue. These Italian prints also contain false credits, such as including German sex comedy specialist Hans Billian as an additional director.

Venus in Furs began shooting on October 1, 1968. It was shot in Rome, Marbella, Barcelona, and Istanbul and within studios Estdusio Balcazar in Barcelona and A.T.C. at Grottaferrata in Rome.

The film is unrelated to the novel Venus in Furs. At the time, names like Leopold von Sacher-Masoch and Marquis de Sade were in vogue more so for promoting shocking eroticism seen in various 1960s horror films. The title was imposed on Franco by an American distributor, with the director preferring the title Black Angel. Franco stated the lead was meant to be a black man pursuing a woman played by Maria Rohm. Franco added scenes with Rohm walking nude down a flight of stairs with a fur coat behind her to describe the title.

The music in the film was performed by Manfred Mann and Mike Hugg. Mann is also in the film, playing electric piano during the performance of "Let's Get Together".

== Release ==
Venus in Furs was released in Italy on August 19, 1969 ,with a 92-minute runtime. La Stampa reported the film screened for about three months. Despite being a West German co-production, no record of the film being released in Germany was found for this period.

In October 1968, Robert S. Eisen, previously of Producers Film Services, became head of post-production at Commonwealth United Productions. Along with his brother Harry Eisen, the two created the American versions of both Venus in Furs and 99 Women (1969). It was edited to include various optical effects and a narration from James Darren that were written by Malvin Wald. Franco would later say he disliked these changes. The company's financial collapse delayed the release Venus in Furs. Promotional material still listed Commonwealth as a distributor, when the film was released by American International Pictures in May 1970.

La Stampa reported in 1971 that a court of Bologna condemned actors Kinski and Margaret Lee and producer Igor Bianchi to three months imprisonment and a fine of 40,000 Italian lire for "complicity in an obscene spectacle" and that the film was judged by Italian courts as "a work of little artistic content and only a pretext for the exhibition of nudity and relations against nature. Even in the current age of moral evolution, the film is to be considered an insult to the modesty of the average citizen." All prints of the film were confiscated.

Venus in Furs was released to DVD on February 22, 2005, by Blue Underground. The version of the film known as Venus in Furs, opposed to Paroxismus, was described by Franco biographer Stephen Thrower as "radically different" from Franco's original film. As the other available version made publicly available sourced from Italian version of the film on TVR Teleitalia as Paroxismus ...pud una morta rivivere per amore? also featured further edits, Thrower wrote in 2015 that it was impossible to decipher from the available materials which version represents Franco's preferred version.

== Reception ==
From contemporary reviews, "Rick." of Variety reviewed an English-language dub version of the film which ran at 86 minutes. The review complimented the cinematography and editing, while finding the film poorly written, with the narration being "too much of a bad thing." The review concluded, "If all Darren's narration and half of his dialogue with Miss McNair were cut, Venus in Furs might have been a fascinating film." Roger Greenspun of The New York Times found that the film "features much inept fancy moviemaking (including echoes of La dolce vita and even Vertigo), some seminudity, and virtually endless confusion."

Franco biographer Stephen Thrower stated the film was the best one Franco made with Harry Alan Towers, describing it as "a sui-generis poetic fantasy" and that it "showed Franco to be more than a sensationalist purveyor of sleaze; instead it created a puzzling, melancholy dream space in which dislocation and mystery predominated" and that it was one of Franco's "most engaging and memorable films."

== See also ==
- Klaus Kinski filmography
