= Eve (1968 film) =

Thriller film by Jeremy Summers

- Theatrical release poster
- Directed by: Jeremy Summers
- Screenplay by: Peter Welbeck
- Produced by: Harry Alan Towers
- Starring: Robert Walker; Fred Clark; Herbert Lom; Christopher Lee; Celeste Yarnall
- Cinematography: Manuel Merino
- Edited by: Alan Morrison
- Music by: Malcolm Lockyer
- Distributed by: Anglo-Amalgamated Film Distributors (UK) Commonwealth United Corporation (US)
- Release date: July 1968 (New Orleans)
- Running time: 94 minutes
- Countries: Spain; United Kingdom; Liechtenstein; United States
- Language: English

Eve (also known as The Face of Eve, Eva, Eva en la Selva, Eve in the Jungle, and Diana, Daughter of the Wilderness) is a 1968 thriller film directed by Jeremy Summers and starring Robert Walker, Fred Clark, Herbert Lom, Christopher Lee and Celeste Yarnall.

== Plot ==
An explorer looking for a priceless missing Inca treasure in the Amazon jungle runs across a bikini clad and barefoot young woman named Eve, who is worshipped as a goddess by jungle natives. Eve is also being pursued by a showman who wants her for his freak show; by the natives who now want to kill her for helping a white man; and by an explorer, Eve's grandfather, who wants to silence her.

== Cast ==
- Robert Walker as Mike Yates
- Fred Clark as John Burke
- Herbert Lom as Diego
- Christopher Lee as Colonel Stuart
- Celeste Yarnall as Eve
- Rosenda Monteros as Conchita
- Maria Rohm as Anna
- Jose Ma Caffarel as José
- Ricardo Diaz as Bruno

== Production ==
The film was a co-production between Britain, Spain, Liechtenstein and the United States, and location scenes were filmed in Brazil.

When the director quit midway through filming, Spanish horror film director Jesus Franco was brought in to finish the job.

The fur bikini worn by Celeste Yarnall was altered from that worn by Raquel Welch in One Million Years B.C. (1966).

=== Song credits ===
Lyric by Hal Shaperl, sung by Jago Simms.

== Critical reception ==
The Monthly Film Bulletin wrote: " 'Say, Eve, you seen any good caves around here lately?' quips the intrepid white explorer to the blonde jungle girl in what one assumes to be the only intentionally comic moment of this exceedingly tedious trek along the Amazon. The sight of Eve emerging from her well-appointed cave in one of her quick-change bikini numbers and scattering the awe-struck headhunters with an imperious glance and a crack of her whip promises something on the lines of the happier days of Tarzan and Jane, but thereafter this splendidly improbable grande dame of the jungle is relegated to a minor role and the rest is crassly scripted nonsense padded out with a few library snippets of what passes for the local fauna."

TV Guide called it a "very poorly done story of a Tarzaness."

Dave Sindelar wrote in Fantastic Movie Musings and Ramblings: "it's a dull affair, especially during the long middle section where the hero returns to civilization, and any interest it does generate is more due to the presence of several familiar faces (Herbert Lom, Christopher Lee, Fred Clark) than anything that actually happens. One fun thing to do in the movie is to keep track of how many characters die as a result of their own monumental stupidity; I count at least three."

== See also ==
- List of American films of 1968
