= Sumuru (2003 film) =

- Directed by: Darrell Roodt
- Written by: Torsten Dewi; Sax Rohmer; Peter Welbeck; Peter Jobin
- Produced by: Harry Alan Towers; Brigid Olen; Rola Bauer
- Starring: Alexandra Kamp; Michael Shanks
- Cinematography: Giulio Biccari
- Edited by: Avril Beukes
- Music by: Guy Farley
- Distributed by: Tandem Communications
- Release date: 30 April 2003
- Running time: 90 minutes
- Countries: United Kingdom; South Africa; Germany
- Language: English

Sumuru is a 2003 science fiction film directed by Darrell Roodt and starring Alexandra Kamp and Michael Shanks. It is an update of the character Sumuru created by pulp novelist Sax Rohmer. It was the first adaptation of Sumuru in a sci-fi setting (the prior two adaptions were The Million Eyes of Sumuru (1967) and The Girl from Rio (1969)).

== Story ==
Earth's outermost colony was forgotten for 900 years – until now. Cut off from the rest of the universe, men have become beasts of labor – and women rule.

Arriving on the planet Antares, Adam Wade and Jake Carpenter come with a mission and a secret. Humanity has suffered from a deadly virus that has left the women barren, and the two are to seek out the last fertile members of the human race and relocate them.

When the small spaceship crashes, the two find the planet run by women ruled by Queen Sumuru, and the men slaving in primitive mines, used occasionally for procreation purposes.

The two astronauts have to overcome anti-male prejudice as well as earthquakes, a giant snake (The Snake Mother, worshipped as a Goddess by the High Priestess Taxan and her followers) and opposition from snake cult priestess Taxan, but find support in the relatively rational-minded queen Sumuru as well as her personal guard Dove and her kid brother Will.

Ultimately Taxan and her followers are defeated and Adam, Jake, Sumuru and her followers including the freed male slaves set off for an anticipated new home amongst the stars; escaping Antarres, which is due to explode from its internal pressures.

== Cast ==
- Alexandra Kamp – Sumuru
- Michael Shanks – Adam Wade
- Simona Levin – Taxan
- Terence Bridgett – Jake Carpenter
- David Lazarus – Will
- Casey B. Dolan – Dove

== Production ==
The film was produced in late 2002 in the area around Johannesburg and Pretoria, mainly around and in mine dumps, the Voortrekker Monument, a film studio in Johannesburg and a disused explosives factory in Modderfontein.

== Reception ==
The film received relatively bad reviews, being called "thoroughly forgettable"; other reviews refer to the rules of the genre ("trash factor") and call it "good fun".
