= Harry Alan Towers =

British film producer (1920–2009)

- Born: 19 October 1920; London, England, United Kingdom
- Died: 31 July 2009 (aged 88); Canada
- Other name: Peter Welbeck
- Occupations: Film producer, screenwriter
- Spouse: Maria Rohm (m. 1964)

Harry Alan Towers (19 October 1920 – 31 July 2009) was a British radio and independent film producer and screenwriter. He wrote numerous screenplays for the films he produced, often under the pseudonym Peter Welbeck. He produced over 80 feature films and continued to write and produce well into his eighties. Towers was married to the actress Maria Rohm, who appeared in many of his films.

== Background ==
The son of a theatrical agent, Towers was born in Wandsworth, and became a child actor after attending the Italia Conti Academy of Theatre Arts. He then became a prolific radio writer while serving in the Royal Air Force during World War II becoming head of the RAF radio unit on the British Forces Broadcasting Service attaining the rank of Pilot Officer.

In 1946, he and his mother Margaret Miller Towers started a company called Towers of London that sold various syndicated radio programmes around the world, including The Lives of Harry Lime and The Black Museum with Orson Welles, Secrets of Scotland Yard with Clive Brook, Horatio Hornblower in which Michael Hordern played the famous character created by C. S. Forester, and a series based on the Sherlock Holmes stories, featuring John Gielgud as Holmes, Ralph Richardson as Watson, and Orson Welles as Professor Moriarty.

In the late 1940s he made an Australian radio series with Chips Rafferty and Peter Finch, The Sundowner.

Based on his radio success, in the mid-1950s he produced television shows for ITV such as Armchair Theatre, The Golden Fleece, The Boy About the Place, Teddy Gang, The Lady Asks for Help, The Scarlet Pimpernel, The Suicide Club, The Little Black Book, The New Adventures of Martin Kane, A Christmas Carol, 24 Hours a Day, Down to the Sea, Gun Rule, Dial 999 (TV series) and many others.

On 7 April 1956, Billboard magazine announced J. Elroy McCaw's WINS in New York made a deal with Towers for deejay Alan Freed to do a special taped 1/2-hour rock 'n' roll record show on Saturday nights over Radio Luxembourg, which beamed to most of the countries of Free Europe.

== Vice activities ==
In 1961 Towers, with English girlfriend, Mariella Novotny (real name Stella Capes), was charged with operating a vice ring at a New York hotel, but he jumped bail and returned to Europe. Novotny, in her statement to the FBI, claimed Towers was a Soviet agent responsible for providing compromising information on individuals for the benefit of the U.S.S.R. Lobster Magazine ran an article in 1983 citing sources who alleged Towers was linked with (among others) Stephen Ward, Peter Lawford, the Soviet Union, and a vice ring at the United Nations. Hearst Corporation newspapers had already mentioned Towers's name in a 1963 article featuring coded references to a liaison between a pre-White House John F. Kennedy and Novotny, a known prostitute. The charges against Towers were dropped in 1980 after he paid a £4,200 fine for jumping bail.

== Film career ==
Towers began producing feature films in 1962, sometimes writing the screenplay. Towers filmed in various countries such as South Africa, Ireland, Hong Kong, Bulgaria and others. A number of his films and scripts were based on the works of Sax Rohmer, such as Sumuru and the popular Fu Manchu series of five films starring Christopher Lee. He also adapted the novels of Agatha Christie (And Then There Were None and the Miss Marple series), the Marquis de Sade, and the works of Edgar Wallace. Towers produced three separate film versions of And Then There Were None, each set in a different locale. He worked a number of times with Nat Cohen and it has been argued Towers made his best films with Cohen.

He frequently collaborated with director Jesus Franco during the late 1960s and early 1970s. Towers had a hand in writing and/or producing numerous films directed by Franco, including 99 Women (1969), The Girl from Rio a.k.a. Rio 70 (1969), Venus in Furs (1969), Marquis de Sade: Justine (1969), Eugenie… The Story of Her Journey into Perversion (1970), The Bloody Judge (1970), and Count Dracula (1970). Franco also helmed the last two Fu Manchu films The Blood of Fu Manchu (1968) and The Castle of Fu Manchu (1969).

Towers made several films starring Shirley Eaton.

In a letter from the New York literary agency Albert T Longden Associates, discussing the Sax Rohmer estate, reference was made to Towers producing a sixth Fu Manchu movie, The Children of Fu Manchu, for release in 2009; if the project existed, nothing came of it.

== Death ==
In his last months, Towers was working with Ken Russell on an adaptation of Moll Flanders. He died after a short illness in a Canadian hospital on the last day of July 2009.

== Filmography ==
Year	Film	Based on	Starring	Notes
1961	Information Received	–	William Sylvester, Sabine Sesselmann	Shot in 1959 as an episode of Armchair Theatre
1963	Death Drums Along the River	Sanders of the River (by Edgar Wallace)	Richard Todd, Marianne Koch, Albert Lieven, Walter Rilla, Vivi Bach	
1964	Victim Five	–	Lex Barker, Ronald Fraser, Ann Smyrner, Walter Rilla, Dietmar Schönherr	
1965	Coast of Skeletons	Sanders of the River (by Edgar Wallace)	Richard Todd, Dale Robertson, Heinz Drache, Marianne Koch, Elga Andersen, Dietmar Schönherr	
1965	Sandy the Seal		Heinz Drache, Marianne Koch	
1965	Mozambique	–	Steve Cochran, Hildegard Knef, Paul Hubschmid, Vivi Bach, Dietmar Schönherr	
1965	24 Hours to Kill	–	Lex Barker, Mickey Rooney, Walter Slezak, France Anglade, Hans Clarin, Wolfgang Lukschy	
1965	City of Fear	–	Paul Maxwell, Terry Moore, Marisa Mell, Albert Lieven	
1965	The Face of Fu Manchu	Dr. Fu Manchu (by Sax Rohmer)	Christopher Lee, Nigel Green, Joachim Fuchsberger, Karin Dor, James Robertson Justice, Walter Rilla, Tsai Chin, Howard Marion-Crawford	
1965	Ten Little Indians	And Then There Were None (by Agatha Christie)	Shirley Eaton, Hugh O'Brian, Stanley Holloway, Dennis Price, Wilfrid Hyde-White, Daliah Lavi, Leo Genn, Fabian Forte, Marianne Hoppe, Mario Adorf	
1966	Our Man in Marrakesh	–	Tony Randall, Senta Berger, Herbert Lom, Klaus Kinski, Terry-Thomas, Margaret Lee, Wilfrid Hyde-White, Grégoire Aslan, John Le Mesurier	
1966	Circus of Fear	The Three Just Men (by Edgar Wallace)	Christopher Lee, Leo Genn, Heinz Drache, Klaus Kinski, Margaret Lee, Suzy Kendall, Cecil Parker, Eddi Arent	
1966	The Brides of Fu Manchu	Dr. Fu Manchu (by Sax Rohmer)	Christopher Lee, Douglas Wilmer, Heinz Drache, Marie Versini, Rupert Davies, Roger Hanin, Harald Leipnitz, Tsai Chin, Howard Marion-Crawford	
1967	The Million Eyes of Sumuru	Sumuru (by Sax Rohmer)	Shirley Eaton, George Nader, Frankie Avalon, Klaus Kinski, Wilfrid Hyde-White	
1967	The Vengeance of Fu Manchu	Dr. Fu Manchu (by Sax Rohmer)	Christopher Lee, Douglas Wilmer, Horst Frank, Wolfgang Kieling, Peter Carsten, Tony Ferrer, Tsai Chin, Howard Marion-Crawford	
1967	Jules Verne's Rocket to the Moon	From the Earth to the Moon (by Jules Verne)	Burl Ives, Troy Donahue, Gert Fröbe, Terry-Thomas, Daliah Lavi, Hermione Gingold, Lionel Jeffries, Dennis Price	
1967	Five Golden Dragons	–	Robert Cummings, Margaret Lee, Rupert Davies, Klaus Kinski, Maria Perschy, Sieghardt Rupp, Christopher Lee, George Raft, Dan Duryea, Brian Donlevy	
1967	The House of 1,000 Dolls	–	Vincent Price, Martha Hyer, George Nader, Ann Smyrner, Wolfgang Kieling, Herbert Fux	
1968	Eve	–	Celeste Yarnall, Robert Walker, Herbert Lom, Christopher Lee, Fred Clark	
1968	The Blood of Fu Manchu	Dr. Fu Manchu (by Sax Rohmer)	Christopher Lee, Richard Greene, Götz George, Loni von Friedl, Tsai Chin, Howard Marion-Crawford, Shirley Eaton	
1968	Sandy the Seal	–	Heinz Drache, Marianne Koch	Shot in 1965
1969	99 Women	–	Maria Schell, Mercedes McCambridge, Luciana Paluzzi, Herbert Lom	
1969	The Girl from Rio	Sumuru (by Sax Rohmer)	Shirley Eaton, George Sanders, Richard Wyler, Herbert Fleischmann, Walter Rilla	
1969	Marquis de Sade: Justine	Justine (by the Marquis de Sade)	Klaus Kinski, Romina Power, Harald Leipnitz, Jack Palance, Akim Tamiroff, Horst Frank, Sylva Koscina, Mercedes McCambridge	
1969	The Castle of Fu Manchu	Dr. Fu Manchu (by Sax Rohmer)	Christopher Lee, Richard Greene, Maria Perschy, Günther Stoll, Tsai Chin, Howard Marion-Crawford	
1969	Venus in Furs	Venus in Furs (by Leopold von Sacher-Masoch)	James Darren, Barbara McNair, Klaus Kinski, Margaret Lee, Dennis Price	
1970	Eugenie… The Story of Her Journey into Perversion	Philosophy in the Bedroom (by the Marquis de Sade)	Marie Liljedahl, Christopher Lee	
1970	The Bloody Judge	–	Christopher Lee, Maria Schell, Leo Genn, Margaret Lee	
1970	Count Dracula	Dracula (by Bram Stoker)	Christopher Lee, Herbert Lom, Klaus Kinski, Soledad Miranda	
1970	Dorian Gray	The Picture of Dorian Gray (by Oscar Wilde)	Helmut Berger, Richard Todd, Herbert Lom, Marie Liljedahl, Margaret Lee, Isa Miranda	
1971	Black Beauty	Black Beauty (by Anna Sewell)	Mark Lester, Walter Slezak, Uschi Glas, Peter Lee Lawrence	
1972	Treasure Island	Treasure Island (by Robert Louis Stevenson)	Orson Welles, Lionel Stander, Walter Slezak, Rik Battaglia, Kim Burfield	
1972	The Call of the Wild	The Call of the Wild (by Jack London)	Charlton Heston, Michèle Mercier, Raimund Harmstorf, George Eastman, Rik Battaglia	
1973	White Fang	White Fang (by Jack London)	Franco Nero, Virna Lisi, Fernando Rey, Raimund Harmstorf, John Steiner	
1974	And Then There Were None	And Then There Were None (by Agatha Christie)	Oliver Reed, Elke Sommer, Richard Attenborough, Charles Aznavour, Gert Fröbe, Stéphane Audran, Herbert Lom, Adolfo Celi	
1976	Blue Belle	–	Annie Belle, Charles Fawcett, Al Cliver, Rik Battaglia	
1979	H. G. Wells' The Shape of Things to Come	The Shape of Things to Come (by H. G. Wells)	Jack Palance, Carol Lynley, Barry Morse, John Ireland	
1979	King Solomon's Treasure	King Solomon's Mines (by H. Rider Haggard)	David McCallum, John Colicos, Patrick Macnee, Britt Ekland, Wilfrid Hyde-White	
1980	Klondike Fever	Jack London	Jeff East, Angie Dickinson, Rod Steiger, Lorne Greene	
1983	Black Venus	Honoré de Balzac	Josephine Jacqueline Jones	
1983	Fanny Hill	Fanny Hill (by John Cleland)	Lisa Foster, Oliver Reed, Wilfrid Hyde-White, Shelley Winters	
1984	Lady Libertine	Frank and I (by an anonymous writer)	Jennifer Inch, Christopher Pearson	
1984	Christina	–	Jewel Shepard	
1985	Black Arrow	The Black Arrow: A Tale of the Two Roses (by Robert Louis Stevenson)	Benedict Taylor, Oliver Reed, Fernando Rey, Donald Pleasence, Georgia Slowe	
1986	Lightning, the White Stallion	–	Mickey Rooney, Susan George	
1987	Gor	Gor (by John Norman)	Urbano Barberini, Rebecca Ferratti, Oliver Reed	
1988	Skeleton Coast	–	Ernest Borgnine, Robert Vaughn, Oliver Reed. Herbert Lom	
1988	Platoon Leader	Platoon Leader (by James R. McDonough)	Michael Dudikoff	
1988	Howling IV: The Original Nightmare	The Howling (by Gary Brandner)	Romy Windsor	
1988	Outlaw of Gor	Gor (by John Norman)	Urbano Barberini, Rebecca Ferratti, Jack Palance	
1989	Edge of Sanity	Strange Case of Dr Jekyll and Mr Hyde (by Robert Louis Stevenson)	Anthony Perkins, Glynis Barber	
1989	American Ninja 3: Blood Hunt	–	David Bradley, Steve James	
1989	River of Death	River of Death (by Alistair MacLean)	Michael Dudikoff, Robert Vaughn, Donald Pleasence, Herbert Lom, L. Q. Jones	
1989	Ten Little Indians	And Then There Were None (by Agatha Christie)	Donald Pleasence, Herbert Lom, Brenda Vaccaro, Frank Stallone	
1989	The Phantom of the Opera	The Phantom of the Opera (by Gaston Leroux)	Robert Englund	
1990	Buried Alive	The Premature Burial (by Edgar Allan Poe)	Robert Vaughn, Donald Pleasence, John Carradine	
1990	Oddball Hall	–	Don Ameche, Burgess Meredith	
1991	Sherlock Holmes and the Leading Lady	Sherlock Holmes (by Arthur Conan Doyle)	Christopher Lee, Patrick Macnee, Morgan Fairchild	
1992	Incident at Victoria Falls	Sherlock Holmes (by Arthur Conan Doyle)	Christopher Lee, Patrick Macnee, Jenny Seagrove, Joss Ackland, Richard Todd	
1992	The Lost World	The Lost World (by Arthur Conan Doyle)	John Rhys-Davies, David Warner	
1992	Return to the Lost World	The Lost World (by Arthur Conan Doyle)	John Rhys-Davies, David Warner	
1992	Dance Macabre	–	Robert Englund	
1993	Night Terrors	–	Robert Englund	
1995	The Mangler	"The Mangler" (by Stephen King)	Robert Englund	
1995	Bullet to Beijing	Harry Palmer (by Len Deighton)	Michael Caine, Jason Connery, Mia Sara, Michael Gambon, Michael Sarrazin	
1995	Cry, the Beloved Country	Cry, the Beloved Country (by Alan Paton)	James Earl Jones, Richard Harris	
1996	Midnight in Saint Petersburg	Harry Palmer (by Len Deighton)	Michael Caine, Jason Connery, Michael Gambon, Michael Sarrazin	
1998	Owd Bob	Owd Bob (by Alfred Ollivant)	James Cromwell, Colm Meaney, Jemima Rooper, Dylan Provencher	
1999	Treasure Island	Treasure Island (by Robert Louis Stevenson)	Jack Palance	
2000	Death, Deceit and Destiny Aboard the Orient Express	–	Richard Grieco, Christoph Waltz, Romina Mondello, Götz Otto, Nicky Henson	
2001	High Adventure		Thomas Ian Griffith, Anja Kling	
2001	The Sea Wolf		Thomas Ian Griffith, Gerit Kling	also released as SeaWolf: The Pirate's Curse
2003	Sumuru	Sumuru (by Sax Rohmer)	Alexandra Kamp, Michael Shanks	
2004	Pact with the Devil	The Picture of Dorian Gray (by Oscar Wilde)	Ethan Erickson, Malcolm McDowell, Christoph Waltz	
