= The Vengeance of Fu Manchu =

1967 British film by Jeremy Summers

- Theatrical release poster
- Directed by: Jeremy Summers
- Screenplay by: Peter Welbeck
- Based on: Fu Manchu by Sax Rohmer
- Produced by: Harry Alan Towers
- Starring: Christopher Lee; Douglas Wilmer; Tsai Chin; Maria Rohm; Noel Trevarthen; Howard Marion-Crawford
- Cinematography: John Von Kotze
- Edited by: Allan Morrison
- Music by: Malcolm Lockyer; Gert Wilden (West Germany)
- Production companies: Babasdave Films; Constantin Film
- Distributed by: Anglo-Amalgamated; Warner-Pathé (UK); Constantin Film (West Germany)
- Release date: 25 May 1967
- Running time: 91 minutes
- Countries: United Kingdom; West Germany
- Language: English

The Vengeance of Fu Manchu (also known as Sax Rohmer's the Vengeance of Fu Manchu and Die Rache des Dr. Fu Man Chu) is a 1967 British crime thriller adventure film directed by Jeremy Summers and starring Christopher Lee, Horst Frank, Douglas Wilmer and Tsai Chin. It was the third British/West German Constantin Film co-production of the Dr. Fu Manchu series and the first to be filmed in Hong Kong at the renowned Shaw Brothers studio. It was generally released in the U.K. through Warner-Pathé (as the second half of a double feature with the Lindsay Shonteff film The Million Eyes of Sumuru) on 3 December 1967.

== Cast ==
Credits adapted from the booklet of the Powerhouse Films Blu-ray boxset The Fu Manchu Cycle: 1965-1969.

- Christopher Lee as Fu Manchu
- Douglas Wilmer as Nayland Smith
- Tsai Chin as Lin Tang
- Horst Frank as Rudy
- Noel Trevarthen as Mark Weston
- Maria Rohm as Ingrid Swenson
- Tony Ferrer as Inspector Ramos
- Peter Carsten as Kurt
- Wolfgang Kieling as Dr. Lieberson
- Suzanne Roquette as Maria
- Howard Marion-Crawford as Dr. Petrie
- Mona Chong as Jasmin
- Eddie Byrne as Ship's Captain (uncredited)

== Reception ==
A review of the film in The New York Times reported that "Line for line, scene for scene, the picture is a dignified, hilariously restrained continuation of the Fu of yore," and noted that it had "plenty of mayhem, no gore, [and was] fine for the kids." The Monthly Film Bulletin wrote: "Disappointingly, Fu Manchu's vengeance turns out to be a very tame affair after the period splendours of his earlier exploits. The ingredients are all here – boa constrictor plot, attractively photographed exteriors, and the Oriental villain and his sadistic daughter as venomous as ever – but somehow they fail to jell, and Jeremy Summers shows none of the inventiveness that Don Sharp brought to the first two films in this series. ... Christopher Lee and Tsai Chin are as impeccably sinister as before; but the hordes of black pyjamaed henchmen are a curiously wooden lot, as though they had strayed on to the set from a Red Guard parade."
