= Margaret Lee (English actress) =

British actress (1943–2024)

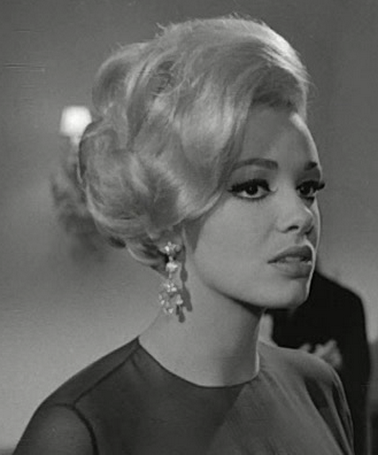
- Lee in I due pericoli pubblici (1964)
- Born: Margaret Gwendolyn Box; 4 August 1943; Wolverhampton, England
- Died: 24 April 2024 (aged 80)
- Education: Italia Conti Academy of Theatre Arts
- Occupation: Actress
- Years active: 1962–1982

Margaret Gwendolyn Box (4 August 1943 – 24 April 2024), known professionally as Margaret Lee, was a British actress who was a popular leading lady in Italian films in the 1960s and 1970s.

== Early career ==
Born in Wolverhampton, England, but raised in London where she attended The John Roan School in Greenwich, she was educated at the Italia Conti Theatre School in London, graduating in 1960.

"I wanted to act in the Theatre (never thought of films) and was willing to take any path that might lead me there. I read in The Stage of auditions for showgirls at the famous Moulin Rouge in Paris. I was 17. I wanted to get away from home, and so I auditioned and was taken on." - Margaret Lee

She moved to Rome shortly afterwards to pursue a career in films. Her film debut came in the sword and sandal adventure Fire Monsters Against the Son of Hercules (1962), where she played the female lead alongside Reg Lewis, but it was a string of popular comedies that initially made Lee a star in Italy. With a blonde, fluffy look modelled after Marilyn Monroe, Lee spent the first half of the 1960s appearing in numerous Italian comedies and parodies – several of which starred the popular comedic duo Franco and Ciccio. Few of these films received much, if any, distribution in English-speaking territories but they were highly successful in Italy, and made Lee a well-known film actress.

== Eurospy films ==
Though she failed to win the role of Tatiana Romanova in From Russia with Love, Lee moved away from comedies and started appearing in a long line of Eurospy films, where she was frequently cast as sexy femme fatales. Her appearance also changed as she dropped the blonde Marilyn Monroe-inspired look and became a brunette instead. Some of the most famous Eurospy films Lee starred in were Our Agent Tiger (1965) by Claude Chabrol, Agent 077: From the Orient with Fury (1965) by Sergio Grieco, Kiss the Girls and Make Them Die (1966) by Henry Levin and Dick Smart 2.007 (1967) by Franco Prosperi.

== International career ==
Lee's beauty and talent also caught the eye of international film producer Harry Alan Towers, who gave Lee wider international recognition by casting her in prominent roles in several of his all-star cast productions; starting with the British thriller Circus of Fear (1966), directed by John Llewellyn Moxey. Towers also cast Lee in the spy-comedy Our Man in Marrakesh (1966), directed by Don Sharp; the action film Five Golden Dragons (1967), directed by Jeremy Summers; the thrillers Venus in Furs (1969) and The Bloody Judge (1970), both directed by Jesús Franco; and finally in Dorian Gray (1970), directed by Massimo Dallamano.

Lee's co-star in Circus of Fear, Five Golden Dragons, Coplan Saves His Skin and Venus in Furs was the renowned German actor Klaus Kinski (who was also a regular in Harry Alan Towers productions). The pairing of Lee and Kinski would prove to be very popular among cinema-goers – especially in Italy – so they would continue to act together until the early 1970s; appearing in a total of 12 films together.

Outside of her work for Towers, Lee didn't appear in any further international films but in 1972 she guest starred in the British television series The Protectors, in the episode "The Numbers Game".

== Television ==
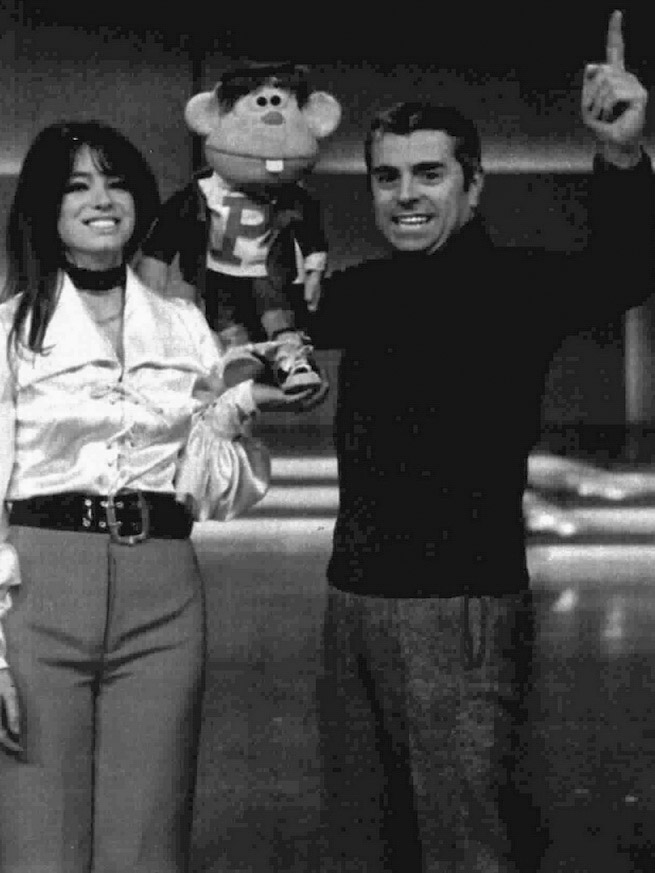
Lee alongside Raffaele Pisu and the puppet Provolino in an Italian TV-show (1970)

Margaret Lee was also popular on Italian television in the 1960s; appearing as a showgirl alongside the famous singer Johnny Dorelli. Lee also starred with Dorelli in his film debut Arriva Dorellik, also known as How to Kill 400 Duponts (1967).

== Later career ==
By the early 1970s, Lee's movie career had descended into exploitation; culminating in Fernando Di Leo's violent thriller Slaughter Hotel (1971). She eventually disappeared from the Italian movie scene by 1974, and returned to England. Lee returned to Italy in 1981 to appear in Dino Risi's comedy Sesso e volentieri (1982), which reunited her with her old co-star Johnny Dorelli. She only appeared in one further film, the crime-comedy Neapolitan Sting (1983), before retiring from movies and moving to the United States.

== Personal life and death ==
Lee married three times: to Gino Malerba, Patrick Anderson and Walter Creighton. Lee was the mother of production manager Roberto Malerba, a producer on Sense8 and production manager/producer Damian Anderson.

Margaret Lee died on 24 April 2024, at the age of 80.

== Filmography ==
- Fire Monsters Against the Son of Hercules (1962)
- I tre nemici (1962)
- Due samurai per cento geishe (1962)
- Toto's First Night (1962)
- Cleopatra (1963) – uncredited bit part role
- Avventura al motel (1963)
- La ballata dei mariti (1963)
- The Swindlers (1963)
- Samson and the Sea Beast (1963)
- Siamo tutti pomicioni (1963)
- I 4 tassisti (1963)
- Vino whisky e acqua salata (a.k.a. Wine, Whiskey and Salt Water, 1963)
- Via Veneto (1963)
- Adolescenti al sole (1964)
- Due mattacchioni al Moulin Rouge (1964)
- I due pericoli pubblici (1964)
- In ginocchio da te (1964)
- The Maniacs (1964)
- The Twelve-Handed Men of Mars (1964)
- A Monster and a Half (1964)
- La vedovella (1964)
- Agent 077: From the Orient with Fury (1965)
- Casanova 70 (1965)
- Two Sergeants of General Custer (1965)
- I Kill, You Kill (1965)
- Letti sbagliati (1965)
- The Double Bed (1965)
- The Dreamer (1965)
- The Mona Lisa Has Been Stolen (1965)
- Questa volta parliamo di uomini (a.k.a. Let's Talk About Men, 1965)
- Questo pazzo, pazzo mondo della canzone (1965)
- Lo scippo (1965)
- La ragazzola (1965)
- Our Agent Tiger (1965)
- Killer's Carnival (1966)
- Circus of Fear (1966)
- Djurado (a.k.a. Johnny Golden Poker, 1966)
- The Mona Lisa Has Been Stolen (1966)
- Secret Agent Super Dragon (1966)
- Our Man in Marrakesh (1966)
- Kiss the Girls and Make Them Die (1966)
- Web of Violence (1966)
- Le Soleil des Voyous (1967)
- How to Kill 400 Duponts (1967)
- Master Stroke (1967)
- Spy Fit (1967)
- Dick Smart 2.007 (1967)
- Five Golden Dragons (1967)
- Franco, Ciccio e le vedove allegre (a.k.a. Franco, Ciccio and the Cheerful Widows, 1967)
- Action Man (1967)
- Bandits in Milan (1968)
- The Cats (1968)
- Coplan Saves His Skin (1968)
- OSS 117 - Double Agent (1968)
- Ghosts – Italian Style (1968)
- Cry Chicago (a.k.a. ¡Viva América! or Mafia Mob, 1969)
- Five for Hell (1969)
- Double Face (1969)
- Il Cenerentolo (1969) – TV special
- House of Pleasure (1969)
- What Did Stalin Do to Women? (1969)
- A Candidate for a Killing (1969)
- Venus in Furs (1969)
- Rendezvous with Dishonour (1970)
- Dorian Gray (1970)
- The Bloody Judge (1970)
- Blood Bath – unreleased
- The Beasts (1971)
- Slaughter Hotel (1971)
- Nokaut (a.k.a. The Rogue, 1971)
- Papesatan, papesatan aleppe (1973)
- The Killers Are Our Guests (1974)
- La sensualità è un attimo di vita (1974)
- Sesso e volentieri (1982)
- Neapolitan Sting (1983)
