= Marquis de Sade: Justine =

1968 film by Jesús Franco

- Italian theatrical release poster for Marquis de Sade: Justine
- Directed by: Jesús Franco
- Screenplay by: Harry Alan Towers (as Peter Wellbeck)
- Based on: Justine ou les malheurs de la vertu by Marquis de Sade
- Produced by: Harry Alan Towers; Alexander Grüter
- Starring: Klaus Kinski; Romina Power; Maria Rohm; Akim Tamiroff; Mercedes McCambridge; Rosemary Dexter; Jack Palance; Sylva Koscina; Carmen de Lirio; Gustavo Re
- Cinematography: Manuel Merino
- Edited by: Nicholas Wentworth; Francesco Bertuccioli
- Music by: Bruno Nicolai
- Production companies: Corona Filmproduktion GmbH; Aica Cinematografica S.r.l.; Etablissement Sargon
- Distributed by: Constantin Film (West Germany); CIDIF (Italy)
- Release dates: 3 April 1969 (Italy); 13 June 1969 (West Germany)
- Running time: 124 minutes
- Countries: West Germany; Italy
- Language: English

Marquis de Sade: Justine (Italian: Justine ovvero le disavventure della virtù, lit. 'Justine or the misadventures of virtue', also released as Deadly Sanctuary) is a 1969 erotic period drama film directed by Jesús Franco, written and produced by Harry Alan Towers, and based on the 1791 novel Justine by the Marquis de Sade. It stars Romina Power as the title character, with Maria Rohm, Klaus Kinski, Akim Tamiroff, Harald Leipnitz, Rosemary Dexter, Horst Frank, Sylva Koscina and Mercedes McCambridge.

The film is set in 1700s France where Justine (Power) and her sister Juliette (Rohm) are orphans in Paris. Juliette becomes a prostitute and marries a rich noble. Justine is falsely arrested and sentenced to death, then escapes from prison to become a fugitive.

The film was an international co-production between West Germany and Italy. Justine had Franco's largest budget to date, of just under a million dollars. Franco originally wanted to cast Rosemary Dexter as Justine, but was convinced to cast Romina Power in the role, which led to Franco changing the story to suit her.

== Plot ==
In Paris during the late 18th-century, Justine (Romina Power) lives with her sister Juliette (Maria Rohm) in a convent. When they learn of their father's death, they are ordered out of the convent with their father's remaining money - 100 coins, which is not enough to survive. Juliette takes Justine to a friend, Madame de Buission, a brothel owner who requires the girls to work as prostitutes in return for accommodation. Justine refuses and leaves the brothel with her gold while Juliette stays. Juliette and a fellow prostitute named Claudine (Rosemary Dexter) kill Madame de Buisson and one of her clients, stealing her gold and making their escape.

A man named Du Harpin (Akim Tamiroff) agrees to let Justine stay for free if she serves as his maid. Du Harpin's master forces himself on Justine. She escapes but is instructed by Du Harpin to steal the man's gold amulet. Justine refuses. While she is asleep, Du Harpin places the amulet in Justine's belongings to frame her, out of spite for her having refused to steal it for him. The next day, police find the amulet in Justine's belongings. Justine is taken to prison where she meets Madame Dubois, a virago sentenced for execution. Madame Dubois, impressed by Justine's innocent looks, includes her in an escape plan. The next day, Madame Dubois and Justine escape the prison safely.

While hiding out in a forest, Madame Dubois (Mercedes McCambridge) accepts Justine as part of her group. The male members of the group attempt to rape Justine. She escapes and faints near the house of a painter named Raymond (Harald Leipnitz), who eventually makes her his model. They fall in love and live happily until the police arrive at Raymond's home, searching for Justine, and she must escape again.

While on the run, Justine becomes a personal attendant to the Marquise de Bressac (Sylva Koscina), whose husband Marquis de Bressac (Horst Frank) asks Justine to kill his wife or be framed for a crime. The husband adds poison to the wine on his wife dinner tray, but the wife tests the food on the tray on the dog and the dog falls dead. Justine and the Marquise become terrorized after witnessing the death of the dog poisoned by the food they were about to eat. Terrified and revengeful Marquise attempts to poison her husband, but he clandestinely switches the glasses and tricks her into drinking his poisoned wine, thus killing her dead. In the following sadistic punishment of Justine, the Marquis brands the letter 'M' for 'Murderess' on Justine's naked chest between her bare breasts.

Humiliated and branded Justine arrives at a sanctuary where four ascetics, who are pretending to be religious and righteous and are posing as clerics living a life of meditation and study. Oblivious Justine asks for sanctuary there and is instantly accepted by a secret sadistic Order chaired by devious Father Antonin (Jack Palance) who is constantly drunk. She soon learns, however, that the four men are sexual deviants whose four other female servants are, in fact, former prostitutes and now serving as sex slaves. Justine ends up chained and tortured in the dungeon. Father Antonin drinks a large chaise of alcohol praising Justine's sense of pleasure that is enduring her suffering, to which frightened Justine blindly agrees under pressure. Pleased at having learnt their philosophy so swiftly, Father Antonin, whose intoxication robs him of any sense of compassion, now plans to "release" Justine by killing her in torture during a ritual of sticking many sharp needles under her naked skin and hanging her in chains. The ceremony of hanging Justine goes awry when Father Antonin tortures her with a burning cross and the fire gets to the skin of her naked breasts. So Justine, who could not sustain the unbearable pain, suddenly screams and shakes her chains while other slaves provide help to her and assist in her escape through a tunnel during the disastrous commotion.

Raymond finds Justine unconscious and half-naked lying flat on the road and takes her to a nearby city. There, Madame Dubois finds Justine and takes her to work as a nude show performer. During the show, Justine's brand "M" on her bare chest becomes visible to the crowd and causes an uproar with accusations of her being a murderer. As she is being taken away by the police, she is spotted by her sister Juliette, now a mistress of a powerful Minister of the King of France. The Minister stops the police from taking the girl to prison and offers her protection. The two sisters reunite in tears. Juliette describes her wicked life as empty and says that Justine will earn her reward of two million francs for a virtuous life despite her sufferings.

Juliette takes Justine away to live with her in her palace and finally, Justine and Raymond are seen walking away peacefully.

== Cast ==
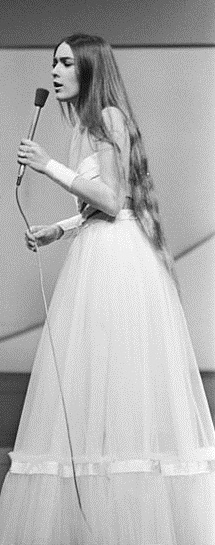
Director Jesús Franco was forced to cast Romina Power (pictured) in the film, stating that "most of the time she didn't even know we were shooting."

- Klaus Kinski as the Marquis de Sade
- Romina Power as Justine
- Maria Rohm as Juliette
- Harald Leipnitz as Raymond
- Jack Palance as Father Antonin
- Rosemary Dexter as Claudine
- Akim Tamiroff as du Harpin
- Horst Frank as Marquis de Bressac
- Sylva Koscina as Marquise de Bressac
- Mercedes McCambridge as Madame Dubois
- Carmen de Lirio as Madame de Buisson
- Gustavo Re as Descroches
- José Manuel Martín as Victor
- Rosalba Neri as Florette
- Claudia Gravy as Olivia
- Gérard Tichy as Comte de Courville
- Howard Vernon as Father Clement
- Angel Petit as Jasmin
- Mike Brendel as Pierre
- Serena Vergano as a prisoner
- Luis Ciges as Manuel
- Jesús Franco as Master of Ceremonies

== Production ==
After working on the film The Blood of Fu Manchu, producer Harry Alan Towers and director Jesús Franco wanted to make a film more aimed at an adult audience. Following Franco's desire to make an erotic film, Towers began writing a script based on Justine ou les malheurs de la vertu. The film had a budget that was less than one million dollars but was still Franco's highest budget film at the time.

Rosemary Dexter was originally intended to portray Justine, but only appears briefly in the role of Claudine. Romina Power's role in the film was forced on Franco by a Hollywood financer, which angered Franco as he felt that Power lacked the acting experience and sensuality that the role required. Franco altered the story to fit her, which he felt diluted the essence of de Sade's original story.

Filming took place in Franco's home country of Spain, in and around Barcelona. Locations included Palau Nacional, Montjuïc Castle, Park Güell, Plaça del Rei, and Plaça de Sant Felip Neri. The film was shot in English, and later dubbed in Italian and German.

== Release ==
Marquis de Sade: Justine was released in Italy on 3 April 1969 and in West Germany on 13 June 1969. In the United States, the film was distributed by American International Pictures. The film was heavily censored on its initial release with running times ranging from 120, 105, 93 and 90 minutes. However, the digital 2023 4K region free release of the film is now presented in a brand-new restoration from the uncensored original camera negative with Dolby Vision HDR and is loaded with extras, including the alternate "deadly sanctuary" cut in the first time ever.

== Reception ==
- JUSTINE is one of the most lavish and bizarre erotic shockers ever made... (critical comments on the cover of the 2023 4K region free release of the film presented in a brand-new restoration from the uncensored original camera negative)
- Robert Firsching for Allmovie gave the film two stars, referring to it as an "uneven adaptation of the Marquis de Sade's notorious Justine".
- "... a lavishly appointed costume drama leavened with lashings of kinky sex, tantamount to Tony Richardson’s Tom Jones with full frontal nudity."
- "more parable in here than perversion"

== Home video ==
The film was released on DVD by Blue Underground on 27 January 2004. The DVD includes an interview with Jess Franco and Harry Alan Towers. It was released on a Region 2 DVD on 27 January 2003 by Anchor Bay Entertainment.

The 2023 4K region free release of the film presented in a brand-new restoration from the uncensored original camera negative with Dolby Vision HDR and is loaded with extras, including the alternate "deadly sanctuary" cut in the first time ever. The release was made by 'Blue underground' and consists of two discs: one 1080p bluray 50GB disc and one 2160p 4K HDR triple layer 100GB disc. The original printing is packed in a designer slip cover with a cut-out oval window that opens to the original image of a sadistic torture of a character in the movie. This newest home video of the film is reviewed by critics as the better version of 'Marquis de Sade's Justine' that delivers truly amazing video and audio in this excellent Blu-ray release.

== See also ==
- Cruel Passion, another film adaptation of the same novel
- Klaus Kinski filmography
- Sylva Koscina filmography
- Marquis de Sade in popular culture
- List of German films of the 1960s
- List of Italian films of 1969
