= Dracula 3000 =

2004 science fiction horror television film

- Dracula 3000 DVD cover
- Genre: Science fiction horror film
- Based on: Dracula by Bram Stoker
- Written by: Ivan Milborrow; Darrell Roodt
- Directed by: Darrell Roodt
- Starring: Casper Van Dien; Erika Eleniak; Coolio; Alexandra Kamp; Grant Swanby; Langley Kirkwood; Tommy Lister Jr. Udo Kier
- Theme music composer: Michael Hoenig
- Countries of origin: United States; South Africa
- Original language: English

Production
- Producers: Frank Hübner; Brad Krevoy; David Lancaster; David Wicht
- Cinematography: Giulio Biccari
- Editors: Avril Beukes; Ronelle Loots
- Running time: 86 minutes

Original release
- Release: December 7, 2004

Dracula 3000 (stylized as DRACULA.3000, and also known as Dracula 3000: Infinite Darkness) is a 2004 made-for-television vampire film directed by Darrell Roodt. An international co-production of Germany and South Africa, it is an adaptation of Bram Stoker's novel Dracula in the futuristic setting of outer space. The film's title is a reference to Dracula 2000, though they are not connected.

== Plot ==
In the year 3000, the salvage spaceship Mother III happens upon the derelict transport Demeter. Captain Van Helsing and his crew board the abandoned ship.

They explore the bridge and find the corpse of the Demeter's Captain tied to a chair and clutching a crucifix. Despite the misgivings of the crew, particularly intern Mina Murry and vice-captain Aurora, the Captain claims salvage rights and decides to tow the ship back to Earth. As the crew prepares to return, Mother III suddenly uncouples from the Demeter, leaving them stranded with no means of communication.

Later, cargo specialist "187" and deckhand "Humvee" discover a cargo bay full of coffins. 187 speculates that the coffins could contain smuggled goods and opens one, only to find sand. Humvee heads back to the bridge while 187 stays to open the other coffins; he's soon mysteriously attacked. The crew rushes to 187's aid, only to find that he's now a vampire. Under orders from his "master", 187 vows to kill the entire crew.

Aurora, fleeing 187, runs into the "master", a vampire named Count Orlock. Aurora makes her way to a recreation room, where she reports her encounter with Orlock and reveals his intentions to return to Earth. Upon questioning, she's unable to explain how she escaped Orlock unharmed. Thinking that Aurora could be lying, the Captain ties her up, and Humvee guards her. Soon, 187 gains entrance and attacks Humvee, who manages to stake him in the heart with a pool cue. Aurora, still tied up, confesses that she's an undercover android cop investigating salvage activities. This is why Orlock didn’t bite her, as he sensed that she had no actual blood flow. The Captain and Humvee feel betrayed but untie her, thinking that they can use her as a weapon against Orlock, due to her immunity against vampirism. Searching the ship's database, the Captain and the Professor, who uses a wheelchair, discover that the legendary vampire hunter Abraham Van Helsing was one of the Captain's ancestors. The Professor believes that Orlock will seek revenge against the Captain. The Captain learns how vampires can be stopped and decides to steer the Demeter on a course towards a binary star system.

Orlock soon confronts the Captain and Aurora. Aurora leaves to rally reinforcements, leaving the Captain to fight Orlock alone. Orlock eventually gains the upper hand and turns the Captain into a vampire. Aurora and Humvee return, only to be attacked by the Captain. Aurora stakes him with another cue stick, but Mina (now a vampire herself) attacks, allowing Orlock to escape. Humvee dispatches Mina. The Professor, despairing of his chances of survival, finds Orlock, who promises to free him from his disability in return for aiding Orlock's return to Earth. When Aurora and Humvee return to the bridge, they find the Professor passed out. Aurora stabs him with a cross, revealing that he was a vampire. A furious Orlock tries to enter the bridge, but Humvee and Aurora close the door on him, cutting off his arm in the process.

As the Demeter draws closer towards one of the binary stars, Humvee and Aurora confess to each other that neither knows how to pilot the ship. Knowing they are about to die, they take comfort in the fact that Orlock's plan to return to Earth has been foiled. Aurora reveals that she was originally a sexbot before being upgraded to be a cop, meaning she can give Humvee some solace before the end. Humvee accepts the offer and they spend their remaining time having sex.

The movie ends with a video segment from the Demeter's Captain Varna, who announces his intention to sacrifice himself and his ship. The Demeter explodes in space, killing Humvee and Aurora and destroying Orlock.

== Cast ==
- Casper Van Dien as Captain Abraham Van Helsing
- Erika Eleniak as Aurora Ash
- Tommy Lister Jr. as "Humvee"
- Coolio as "187"
- Alexandra Kamp as Mina Murry
- Grant Swanby as Professor Arthur Holmwood
- Langley Kirkwood as Count Orlock
- Udo Kier as Captain Varna

== Reception ==
Critical reaction to Dracula 3000 has been negative. Andrew Stine of Something Awful said, "Whether it's out of some facsimile of genuine interest (rare) or because I just want to see how completely stupid things can possibly get within ninety minutes, I have so far been able to keep myself from lapsing into a waking coma by latching upon some facet of the movie which is not utterly, interminably boring. That is, until Dracula 3000." Mitchell Hattaway of DVD Verdict said, "Dracula 3000 is a shining example of complete filmmaking ineptitude. You can look all you want and you won't find even the slightest hint of intelligence on any level. ... It sucks. Dracula 3000 makes Leprechaun 4: In Space look like Alien."

David Oliver of CHUD.com said, "This is the worst movie I've ever reviewed so far for CHUD. How is it bad? Every particular way you can think of: the acting, the writing, directing... I can go on for paragraphs. ... To call this film shit is an insult to fragrant brown logs everywhere."

== See also ==
- Vampire film
