= City of Fear (1965 film) =

1965 film by Peter Bezencenet

- Directed by: Peter Bezencenet
- Written by: Max Bourne; Harry Alan Towers
- Produced by: Sandy Howard; Arthur Steloff; Harry Alan Towers
- Starring: Paul Maxwell; Terry Moore; Marisa Mell
- Cinematography: Martin Curtis
- Edited by: Peter Boita
- Music by: Johnny Douglas
- Production company: Production Companies
- Distributed by: Allied Artists Pictures; Schneider-Filmverleih
- Release dates: 8 September 1965 (US); 28 October 1966 (UK)
- Running time: 90 minutes
- Countries: United Kingdom; West Germany
- Language: English

City of Fear (German: Scharfe Küsse für Mike Forster) is a 1965 spy thriller film directed by Peter Bezencenet and starring Paul Maxwell, Terry Moore and Marisa Mell. It was written by Max Bourne and Harry Alan Towers.

== Cast ==
- Paul Maxwell as Mike Foster
- Terry Moore as Suzan
- Marisa Mell as Ilona
- Albert Lieven as Dr. Paul Kovac
- Pinkas Braun as Ferenc
- Helga Lehner as Eva
- Zsuzsa Bánki as Magda
- Brigitte Heiberg as Zsu Zsu
- Maria Rohm as maid
- Mária Takács as Marika

== Production ==
The film was a co-production between the United Kingdom and West Germany. Location shooting took place in Austria where the film is partly set.

== Reception ==
The Monthly Film Bulletin wrote: "Conventional escape thriller, with a more than usually implausible plot. But it is quite crisply done in its own way, and if the final escape is somewhat fortuitous, the film at least emerges as more agreeable than many of its genre."

Kine Weekly wrote: "Like nearly all the films produced by Harry Alan Towers, this story has the attraction of interesting foreign backgrounds, and these lend credibility to a plot that packs only one unexpected twist and contains a number of loose ends and the premise that a journalist on duty would be such a fool as to smuggle through the Iron Curtain a package given to him by a shifty-eyed stranger with a typical hard-luck story. ... Main burden of carrying the business through rests on Paul Maxwell as Mike. He has a pleasing personality and a quietly convincing way of acting the improbable. Marisa Mell as the double-dealing Tlona rather gives the game away bv looking too beautifully trustworthy, while Terry Moore has little to do except to be bright and anxious by turns as Suzan. Albert Lieven has only a small and shadowy role as the professor."

== Bibliography ==
- Mann, Dave. Harry Alan Towers: The Transnational Career of a Cinematic Contrarian. McFarland, 2014.
