= Douglas Wilmer =

British actor (1920–2016)

- as Sherlock Holmes (1965)
- Born: 8 January 1920; Brentford, Middlesex, England
- Died: 31 March 2016 (aged 96); Ipswich, Suffolk, England
- Years active: 1945–2012
- Spouses: Elizabeth Joan Melville (m. 1946; ann. 1971); Anne Harding (m. 1985)

Douglas Norman Wilmer (8 January 1920 – 31 March 2016) was an English actor, best known for playing Sherlock Holmes in the eponymous 1965 TV series.

== Early life ==
Wilmer was born 8 January 1920 in Brentford, Middlesex, to Harry Bradlaugh Wilmer (1880–1946) and (Ethel) Kate (née Taverner [or Tavener] (1880–1944). His father was an accountant for Jardine Matheson, and Wilmer spent his childhood in Shanghai where his father worked. When he was about 13 years old, Douglas was sent back to the United Kingdom to attend King's School, Canterbury, and Stonyhurst College. A performance as the Archbishop of Canterbury in a school play at King's School was seen by Dame Sybil Thorndike who afterward told the headmaster "If that boy, playing the Archbishop, were to take to the stage, I think that he could well make a go of it."

After completing school, Wilmer applied for a scholarship at Royal Academy of Dramatic Art and was accepted. Whilst in training at RADA, he was conscripted into the British Army for military service with the Royal Artillery in the Second World War. After training, he was posted to an anti-tank battery, and saw war service in Africa with the Royal West African Frontier Force. He was later invalided out of the Armed Forces, having contracted tuberculosis.

== Career ==
Wilmer made his theatre stage debut in 1945 in repertory at Rugby. He appeared frequently on the London stage, mainly in classical and Shakespearean roles. He made his first major film appearance in Laurence Olivier's Richard III (1955); thereafter, he appeared in a large number of films, mostly in supporting roles. They include several epic films: as M. Desmoulins in The Battle of the River Plate (1956), as Al-Mu'tamin in El Cid (1961), Cleopatra (1963), The Fall of the Roman Empire (1964), as Khalifa Abdullah in Khartoum (1966), as Maj. Gen. Francis de Guingand in Patton (1970), as Sir Thomas Fairfax in Cromwell (1970), and Antony and Cleopatra (1972). Other appearances include Jason and the Argonauts (1963) as Pelias, the Pink Panther films A Shot in the Dark (1964) and Revenge of the Pink Panther (1978), The Vampire Lovers (1970), The Golden Voyage of Sinbad (1973), and Octopussy (1983).

He is mainly associated with the role of Sherlock Holmes, which he first played in the BBC's 1964 production of "The Speckled Band". Together with co-star Nigel Stock, who played Doctor Watson, Wilmer was brought back for a further twelve episodes of the Sherlock Holmes series. In 1973, Wilmer played author Jacques Futrelle's Holmesian detective Professor Van Dusen in The Rivals of Sherlock Holmes for ITV. In 1975, he once again appeared as Holmes (albeit in a supporting role) in Gene Wilder's The Adventure of Sherlock Holmes' Smarter Brother, with Thorley Walters as Dr. Watson. Wilmer also played Sir Denis Nayland Smith in two of Harry Alan Towers' Fu Manchu films, The Brides of Fu Manchu (1966) and The Vengeance of Fu Manchu (1967).

He recorded a series of the stories on audiocassette for Penguin audio books and appeared as a guest at several UK and US events, including the Society's Golden Jubilee Dinner in January 2001. His other television credits include: The Adventures of Robin Hood, The Saint, The Troubleshooters, The Avengers, The Baron, UFO, and Space: 1999. He made a cameo appearance in "The Reichenbach Fall" episode of Sherlock as an irate old man in the Diogenes Club.

== Personal life and death ==
Douglas Wilmer was married three times. In 1946, he married Elizabeth Melville, a fellow RADA student, their marriage was annulled after 25 years. His second marriage in 1973 to wife Barbara ended in a divorce. He married his third wife, Anne (née Harding) in 1985. He lived in Woodbridge, Suffolk in later life, where he ran a wine bar called Sherlock's.

Wilmer's autobiography Stage Whispers (Porter Press, ISBN 978-0-9556564-9-1) was published in 2010. On 31 March 2016, after a short bout of pneumonia, Wilmer died aged 96 at Ipswich Hospital in Suffolk, England. Roger Moore posted a tribute on social media the same day that Wilmer had died; the actors had worked together in the James Bond feature film Octopussy (1983) and on the television show The Saint (a 1963 episode).

== Honours and awards ==
Wilmer was an honorary member of the Sherlock Holmes Society of London, which considered Wilmer "the definitive Holmes". On 24 March 2009 Wilmer was guest of honour at a launch party for his book, held at the National Liberal Club in Whitehall Place, London.

== Filmography ==
- It is Midnight, Doctor Schweitzer (1953, TV Movie) as Father Charles
- Sacrifice to the Wind (1954, TV Movie) as Menelaus
- The Men of Sherwood Forest (1954) as Sir Nigel Saltire
- Richard III (1955) as The Lord Dorset
- Passport to Treason (1955) as Dr. Randolf
- The Battle of the River Plate (1956) as M. Desmoulins − French Minister, Montevideo
- The Diary of Samuel Pepys (1958) as King Charles II
- Dial 999 (TV series), ('Ghost Squad', episode) (1959) as Burton
- An Honourable Murder (1960) as R. Cassius
- El Cid (1961) as Moutamin
- Marco Polo (1962)
- Cleopatra (1963) as Decimus
- Jason and the Argonauts (1963) as Pelias
- The Fall of the Roman Empire (1964) as Pescennius Niger
- Woman of Straw (1964) as Dr. Murray (scenes deleted)
- A Shot in the Dark (1964) as Henri LaFarge
- The Golden Head (1964) as Detective Inspector Stevenson
- One Way Pendulum (1964) as Judge / Maintenance Man
- Khartoum (1966) as Khalifa Abdullah
- The Brides of Fu Manchu (1966) as Nayland Smith
- The Vengeance of Fu Manchu (1967) as Nayland Smith
- Hammerhead (1968) as Pietro Vendriani
- A Nice Girl Like Me (1969) as Postnatal Clinic Doctor
- The Reckoning (1969) as Moyle
- Patton (1970) as Major General Freddie de Guingand
- Cromwell (1970) as Sir Thomas Fairfax
- The Vampire Lovers (1970) as Baron Joachim Von Hartog
- Journey to Murder (1971) as Harry Vaneste (Do Me a Favor and Kill Me)
- Unman, Wittering and Zigo (1971) as Headmaster
- Antony and Cleopatra (1972) as Agrippa
- The Golden Voyage of Sinbad (1973) as Vizier
- The Adventure of Sherlock Holmes' Smarter Brother (1975) as Sherlock Holmes
- The Incredible Sarah (1976) as Montigny
- Revenge of the Pink Panther (1978) as Police Commissioner
- Rough Cut (1980) as Maxwell Levy
- Octopussy (1983) as Jim Fanning
- Sword of the Valiant (1984) as The Black Knight

== See also ==
- List of people who have played Sherlock Holmes
