= 24 Hours to Kill =

1965 film by Peter Bezencenet

- German film poster
- Directed by: Peter Bezencenet
- Screenplay by: Peter Yeldham
- Story by: Harry Alan Towers
- Produced by: Bernard Coote
- Cinematography: Ernest Steward
- Edited by: John Trumper
- Music by: Wilfred Josephs
- Production company: Grixflag Films
- Distributed by: Warner-Pathe Distributors; Constantin Film
- Release date: March 1965
- Running time: 83 minutes
- Country: United Kingdom

24 Hours to Kill is a 1965 British thriller film shot in Techniscope and Technicolor that was filmed in Lebanon. It was directed by Peter Bezencenet, and stars Lex Barker, Mickey Rooney and Walter Slezak.

== Plot ==
A Transcontinental Airlines airliner on an international flight develops engine trouble en route to Athens. Pilot Jamie Faulkner is forced to land in Beirut, where the aircraft is to lay over for 24 hours. Although the crew look forward to rest and relaxation in the then glamorous tourist hot spot, one of the crew members is in fear of his life due to his being a target of a criminal organisation based in the city.

Purser Norman Jones, on the run from a gang of gold smugglers headed by Malouf, a smuggler, gains the sympathy of the flight's captain and other members of the crew who believe that Jones has been wrongly associated with the syndicate.

The gang twice attempts to kill Jones and tries to kidnap air hostess Louise Braganza, the captain's girl friend. Jamie learns that Jones is a member of Malouf's gang and has actually stolen £40,000 worth of bullion from the syndicate.

Although the gangsters kidnap air hostess Françoise Bertram to propose an exchange. Françoise, however, after a fight, is rescued by the airline crew. Jones is captured by Malouf but saved by Jamie and the crew, but just as the airliner takes off, Jones is killed by one of Malouf's men.

== Cast ==
The Crew (as listed in the credits)

- Lex Barker as Captain Jamie Faulkner
- Mickey Rooney as Norman Jones
- Michael Medwin as Tommy Gaskell
- Wolfgang Lukschy as Kurt Hoffner
- Helga Sommerfeld as Louise Braganza
- France Anglade as Françoise Bertram
- Helga Lehner [DE] as Marianne

The Firm

- Walter Slezak as Malouf
- Hans Clarin as Elias
- Shakib Khouri as Andronicus
- Issam Chenawi as Assistant
- Giancarlo Bastianoni [DE] as Killer
- Maria Rohm as Claudine
- Ella Masden as Malouf's driver
- Rachid Alami
- Danny Tabbara

The Rest

- Nadia Gamel [DE] belly dancer
- Gaston Chakini
- Suzette Stellweg
- Clement Manna
- Aoini Masri
- Melvina Amine
- Noureddine Nabaha

And

- Charley's Ballet of Casino du Liban

== Production ==
24 Hours to Kill was written by Peter Yeldham who travelled to Beirut to research the film's plot. (Note: After a lengthy film career in North America, "As work in Hollywood dried up, Barker spent most of the 1960s in Germany, where he enjoyed much popularity and made a great many films.")

The aircraft in 24 Hours to Kill included:

- Antonov An-24B
- Convair 880-22M
- de Havilland DH-106 Comet 4C, c/n 6446, OD-ADQ
- Douglas DC-4
- Douglas DC-8-33
- Ilyushin Il-18
- Lockheed Constellation
- Sud-Aviation SA316B Alouette III, c/n 1118
- Sud-Aviation SE-210 Caravelle VI-N, c/n 174, OD-AEO

== Release ==
24 Hours to Kill was released in March 1965.

== Reception ==
From contemporary reviews, the Monthly Film Bulletin stated the film was pleasantly photographed but "slackly directed" that mostly worked due to the "two bizarre characterizations" by Mickey Rooney and Walter Slezak.

Andy Webb, writing in The Movie Scene noted the beauty of Beirut before Mid-East strife destroyed the once glamorous capital. Webb considered 24 Hours to Kill "quite entertaining and has a touch of 60s spy movie about it with a few moments of action, drinks laced with drugs, shady people following Norman around and of course some danger."
