= The Girl from Rio (1969 film) =

1969 film by Jesús Franco

- Theatrical release poster
- German: Die sieben Männer der Sumuru
- Directed by: Jesús Franco
- Based on: Sumuru by Sax Rohmer
- Produced by: Harry Alan Towers
- Starring: Shirley Eaton; Richard Wyler; George Sanders; Maria Rohm
- Cinematography: Manuel Merino
- Music by: Daniel J. White
- Production companies: Ada Films; Terra-Filmkunst; Udastex Films Inc.
- Distributed by: Constantin Film (West Germany)
- Release dates: 14 March 1969 (West Germany); 20 March 1972 (Barcelona)
- Running time: 84 minutes
- Countries: Spain; West Germany; United States
- Language: English

The Girl from Rio (German: Die sieben Männer der Sumuru, lit. 'The Seven Men of Sumuru') is a 1969 spy-fi film directed by Jess Franco and starring Shirley Eaton, Richard Wyler, George Sanders and Maria Rohm. Written and produced by Harry Alan Towers, the film follows a tribe of Amazonian women, as, led by their queen, they attack wealthy men as part of a long-term plan to take over the world. A co-production between West Germany, Spain and the United States, the film is a sequel to The Million Eyes of Sumuru (1967), and is based on Sax Rohmer's Sumuru character. Nevertheless, Sumuru's character is referred to as either "Sumitra" or "Sunanda".

== Plot ==
Jeff Sutton arrives in Rio, allegedly carrying $10 million in stolen money. Checking into a hotel, he connects with Lesley, a manicurist, apparently oblivious to his alleged crimes. He is also pursued by minions of Sir Macius, a crime lord, who also wants Sutton's stolen millions. After spending a night with Sutton, Lesley finds a newspaper that reports Sutton's crimes. She warns Sutton that being extradited is the least of his problems, and suggests the two escape Rio. Sutton agrees and the two head for the airport. Pursued by Sir Macius's men, Sutton and Leslie are split up. Lesley is captured by Sir Macius's men, while Sutton escapes by boarding a nearby plane. Thinking he's safe, Sutton realizes that the plane's only other passengers are heavily armed women in distinctive uniforms.

Brought to Sir Macius, Lesley is recognized as an operative of the megalomaniacal Sunanda, who has plans of world conquest. Knowing that Sutton has been captured by the Sunanda, Sir Macius has Lesley tortured to reveal his whereabouts.

Knocked out by gas, Sutton awakes to find himself in the secret city of "Femina", where Sunanda is assembling an army of women. She personally gives Sutton a tour of the city, including a display of her wealth with which she will finance her global conquest, money she has stolen from men who themselves stole or obtained money through corrupt means. Now she has her sights set on Sutton's stolen $10 million. Among Sunanda's prisoners, Sutton recognizes Ulla Rossini, a beautiful and rich woman who refused to join Sunanda's army. Jeff warns Ulla to be ready, that he was sent to Rio to get her out of Femina. Sunanda tortures Jeff to reveal the location of the hidden millions, using a radiation machine that causes a slow and painful death. When Sunanda begins torturing Ulla, Sutton breaks, revealing that there is no money, it was just a ploy to grab her attention. Enraged, Sunanda leaves Jeff and Ulla alone. Tricking the guards, Jeff and Ulla escape. Overpowering Sunanda's sentries, the 2 steal one of Sunanda's planes, and fly to Rio.

Reaching Rio, Sutton and Ulla are soon captured by Carl, Macius's chief henchman, and brought to Sir Macius himself. Like Sunanda, Macius is upset to learn that Sutton's money is nonexistent, then realizes that Sutton can still prove useful. As Rio readies itself for Carnival, Sir Macius has Lesley carry a message to Sunanda, offering Sutton in return for half of her fortune. Entering Rio in costume, Sunanda and her soldiers capture Ulla and Irene, Sir Macius's accountant, and orders Jeff to surrender himself to save their lives.

Turning himself over to Sunanda, Sutton is again subjected to Sunanda's machines, while Ulla and Irene are in separate cells. Before Jeff can be fatally tortured, Femina falls under attack by a squadron of helicopters, a strike force of Sir Macius. Jeff's guards leave him to help defend Femina, allowing him to escape the machine, and save Irene and Ulla. Before they can go far, their path is blocked by Lesley, now revealed to Jeff as one of Sunanda's minions. Jeff nevertheless convinces her to join his escape, with Ulla and Irene in tow.

As Femina's defenders quickly fall to Sir Macius's helicopters, Macius lands in person, hoping to grab Sunanda's riches personally. However, Sunanda reaches it first, and arms the city's self-destruct, preferring to destroy Femina rather than let Masius or any men have its wealth. Sutton barely escapes Femina before it self-destructs, presumably killing both Sunanda and Masius, and wiping out her army of women.

In the final scene, Sunanda is shown to have survived the fall of Femina, and now leads a troop of black-clad women board a ship leaving Rio.

== Cast ==
- Shirley Eaton as Sumuru (listed in end credits as Sumitra)
- Richard Wyler as Jeff Sutton
- George Sanders as Sir Masius
- Maria Rohm as Leslye
- Herbert Fleischmann as Carl
- Marta Reves as Ulla Rossini
- Elisa Montés as Irene
- Walter Rilla as Ennio Rossini
- Beni Cardoso as Yana Yuma
- Valentina Godoy as Amazon

== Production ==
The Girl from Rio was conceived by producer Harry Alan Towers as a sequel to his earlier film production of The Million Eyes of Sumuru (1967). Both films cited Sumuru, the female villain in Sax Rohmer's series of pulp novels by Sax Rohmer as its origin. It was one of several productions between Towers and director Jesús Franco shot between 1967 and 1970, leading the two to develop several spy, adventure, and horror films together. Described in Sight & Sound as a "comic book styled thriller", Dave Mann in his book on Towers described it as a film capitalizing on the style of films like Barbarella (1968) or Modesty Blaise (1966).

Filming of the production was done during February 1968. It completed filming in Rio de Janeiro in mid-February.

All credits in film prints cite Towers as a screenwriter under his alias of Peter Welbeck, while Spanish prints add Fanz Eichhorn and German prints add Karl Leder. Franco had previously developed films with similar plots where women try to overthrow a patriarchal society, such as Kiss Me Monster (1969).

== Release ==
The Girl from Rio was released in West Germany on March 14, 1969. This was followed by screenings in Barcelona on March 20, 1972 as La ciudad sin hombres.

While German and English prints credit Allan Morrison as the editor, the Spanish prints credit Ángel Serrano. Both the English-language version and the German filmed titled Die sieben Männer der Sumuru, while both version begin with a pre-credit sequence featuring Beni Cardoso in a transparent gown tormenting a prone male, the English version runs a credits sequences over travelogue footage while Die sieben Manner der Sumuru used special effects and a still of Eaton's face a different music. The English version then features a brief scene of Sumuru giving a motivational speech to her minions while the German print introduces a totally new plot element of with Richard Wyler's character Jeff Sutten visiting the offices of a banker called Ennio Rossini and expands on his plot. The German version provides the template for the Spanish-version, removing scenes of eroticism and nudity.

== Reception ==
From contemporary reviews, a critic in the Spanish newspaper La Vanguardia found that Franco "has not achieved here the precise rhythm of the action movie" finding that "many sequences borders on monotony." A review from ABC Andalucia described it as "an uneven production", that did "not transcend the simply commercial plane of products for popular consumption." The review concluded that "Correct execution and good photography includes splendid exteriors and a dynamic treatment that makes the fantastic story more bearable."

From retrospective reviews, Vic Pratt wrote in Sight & Sound found that along with Franco's The Bloody Judge, the film "amply demonstrate the director's ability to produce dynamic exploitation cinema". Pratt lamented the budget limitations such as cheap props or a lack of special effects, highlighting a laser beam torture device in the film that fires no laser beams.

Mann dismissed the film feeling Franco missed the mark of attempting a film in this style, saying it lacks the wit of Barbarella or the dazzling surface gloss of Modesty Blaise. Stephen Thrower in his book on the career of Franco found the film "silly, often confusing" praising location shooting and clever photography and set design considering the films budget, but that the script, characterizations, and acting were weak, but the "parade of beautiful women in unusual fetish-wear redeem the film, if only on a visual level."

== See also ==
- List of American films of 1968
