= The House of 1,000 Dolls =

1967 film by Jeremy Summers

- Directed by: Jeremy Summers
- Written by: Peter Welbeck
- Produced by: Harry Alan Towers
- Starring: Vincent Price; Martha Hyer; George Nader
- Cinematography: Manuel Merino
- Edited by: Allan Morrison
- Music by: Charles Camilleri
- Production companies: Towers of London (Films); Constantin Film; P.C. Hispamer Films
- Distributed by: American International Pictures
- Release date: 1967
- Running time: 95 minutes
- Countries: United States; Spain; West Germany
- Language: English

The House of 1,000 Dolls (also known as La casa de las mil muñecas, Das Haus Der Tausend Freuden, and House of a Thousand Dolls) is a 1967 Harry Alan Towers German-Spanish international co-production white slavery thriller directed by Jeremy Summers and starring Vincent Price. It has been described as "quite possibly the sleaziest movie AIP [American International Pictures] ever made". The film is set in Tangier. Released initially in Spain, it was not released in the United States until November 1967.

== Plot ==
Stephen Armstrong, vacationing with his wife Marie in Tangiers, runs into an old friend and learns he is searching for his missing girlfriend who was kidnapped by an international gang of white slavers.

The kidnappers are nightclub magician Manderville and his mentalist partner Rebecca. Under the guise of their nightclub act, they hypnotize and kidnap young women for the white slavers, and spirit them away to an exclusive brothel called "The House of 1000 Dolls." Stephen continues the investigation when his friend is murdered.

== Cast ==
- Vincent Price as Felix Manderville
- Martha Hyer as Rebecca
- George Nader as Stephen Armstrong
- Ann Smyrner as Marie Armstrong
- Wolfgang Kieling as Inspector Emil
- Sancho Gracia as Fernando
- Maria Rohm as Diane
- Luis Rivera as Paul
- José Jaspe as Ahmed
- Juan Olaguivel as Salim
- Herbert Fux as Abdu
- Yelena Samarina as Madame Viera
- Diane Bond as Liza
- Andrea Lascelles as Doll
- Ursula Janis as Doll

== Production ==
The film originated with Harry Alan Towers, who shot the movie in Madrid and got Samuel Arkoff at AIP to contribute financing.

At one stage Terence Fisher was announced as director. Vic Damone was mentioned as going to support Vincent Price and Martha Hyer, but he ended up being replaced by George Nader.

Filming began in November 1966. Knowing that local censors would prohibit filming, Towers gave them a copy of Abe Lincoln in Illinois and hired an actor to walk around the set dressed like Abraham Lincoln in case the censors dropped by.

According to Price in a 1984 interview, he had been signed on to the project without full knowledge of what the film would be about. After his scenes were shot, "Martha Hyer and I were led off ... so we went to visit on the set and we found that they were remaking all of the scenes we'd been in, but a pornographic version of it." He added, "I never got to see it."

== Reception ==
The Monthly Film Bulletin wrote: "Had Vincent Price's tongue-in-cheek opening gambit ("Open the coffin") been followed through, more might have been made of this preposterously scripted, crudely directed and indifferently photographed charade. As it is, a confusion of kidnappings, fights, floggings and a little timid strip-tease prove too much for all Price's efforts to treat the whole thing as a joke. He has little support from the rest of the cast, the exotic backgrounds are wasted, and the film could well serve as an object lesson in the kind of disaster that this type of international venture can produce."

The Chicago Tribune called the film "not even bad enough to be good... [a] bargain basement backfire that is strictly discount Price."

The New York Times described the film as containing "routine sleuthing, double-crossing and chasing."

== See also ==
- List of American films of 1967
