= The Call of the Wild (1972 film) =

1972 film by Ken Annakin

- Theatrical release poster
- Directed by: Ken Annakin
- Screenplay by: Peter Yeldham; Peter Welbeck; Wyn Wells
- Based on: The Call of the Wild by: Jack London
- Produced by: Artur Brauner; Harry Alan Towers
- Starring: Charlton Heston; Michèle Mercier; George Eastman; Raimund Harmstorf; Maria Rohm; Sancho Gracia
- Cinematography: John Cabrera
- Edited by: Thelma Connell
- Music by: Carlo Rustichelli
- Production company: Towers of London; Massfilms Ltd.; CCC Film; Oceania Produzioni; Izaro Films; UPF
- Distributed by: Anglo-EMI (UK); Constantin Film (West Germany); Titanus (Italy); Vídeo Mercury (Spain)
- Release dates: 30 November 1972 (Italy); 21 December 1972 (Spain); 29 December 1972 (West Germany); 26 July 1973 (UK)
- Running time: 103 minutes
- Country: United Kingdom; West Germany; Italy; Spain; France
- Language: English

The Call of the Wild is a 1972 northern adventure film directed by Ken Annakin, based upon Jack London's 1903 novel. It stars Charlton Heston, Michèle Mercier, Raimund Harmstorf, George Eastman, and Maria Rohm. The film follows the adventures of Buck, a dog that is brought north to Canada to be used as a sled dog.

== Plot ==
John Thornton, a prospector in the 1897 Klondike Gold Rush, is trying to eke out a living in the harsh conditions of the bitterly cold Yukon region of Canada, with Buck the German Shepherd dog he befriends. Thornton struggles against unscrupulous rivals and natural hazards in the extreme conditions and is greatly helped by Buck who has his own story to tell: he was abducted from a family home and taken north to become a working sled dog. Man and dog forge a true bond of friendship, working together to survive life in the treacherous frozen North. Thornton is killed by Yeehat Indians, but Buck kills the men to avenge him. At the end of the film, Buck comes to the White River to mourn the place where Thornton died.

== Cast ==
- Charlton Heston as John Thornton
- Michèle Mercier as Calliope Laurent
- Raimund Harmstorf as Pete
- George Eastman as Black Burton
- Maria Rohm as Mercedes
- Juan Luis Galiardo as Seze
- Sancho Gracia as Taglish Charlie
- Friedhelm Lehmann as Charles
- Horst Heuck as Hal
- Rik Battaglia as Dutch Harry
- Alfredo Mayo as Judge Miller
- Sverre Wilberg as the Colonel
- Olov Pedersen as Red Sweater
- Per Amvik as François
- Torbjørn Halvorsen as Perrault
- Dan Fosse as Old Miner
- Antonio Mayans as Jack

== Production ==
The film was shot on location in Norway, the Lapland region of Finland, and Spain.

George Eastman's voice was dubbed by an uncredited Robert Rietty.

== Reception ==
Tom Milne wrote in The Monthly Film Bulletin : "Scrappy and sentimentalised adaptation of Jack London's splendid story, rather more faithful to the original than Wellman's 1935 version but without any of the latter's redeeming features. Both Wellman and Kuleshov in Dura Lex extracted a weird expressionistic intensity from London's narrative style, but here he is reduced to a Boys' Own Paper hack mooning on about the love of a dog for a man. The Norwegian locations stand in quite attractively for Alaska, but the call of the wild – Buck prancing through autumnal woods and fondly eyeing his half-wolf offspring – has about as much primitive pull as an invitation to walkies. "

Charlton Heston in his autobiography In the Arena: An Autobiography made it very clear how unhappy he was with this film and asked people to not watch it. In his journals, he said of the production "We're faced with the endless problems of organization, personnel, dogs, publicity . . . I fear I've fallen in with amateurs and con men. This had not been a picture really but a production deal, patched together with incredible adroitness and negotiating skill--and no filmmaking talent whatsoever."

Contemporary British and Irish Film Directors: A Wallflower Critical Guide described it as a "swinging back to action-adventure", starring "Charlton Heston at his best", another in the "long line of Annakin's panoramic films featuring a myriad of beautiful locations".

In Italy the film was a surprise success: it spawned a trend of Northern adventure films during the 1970s, including White Fang (1973).
