= Celeste Yarnall =

American actress

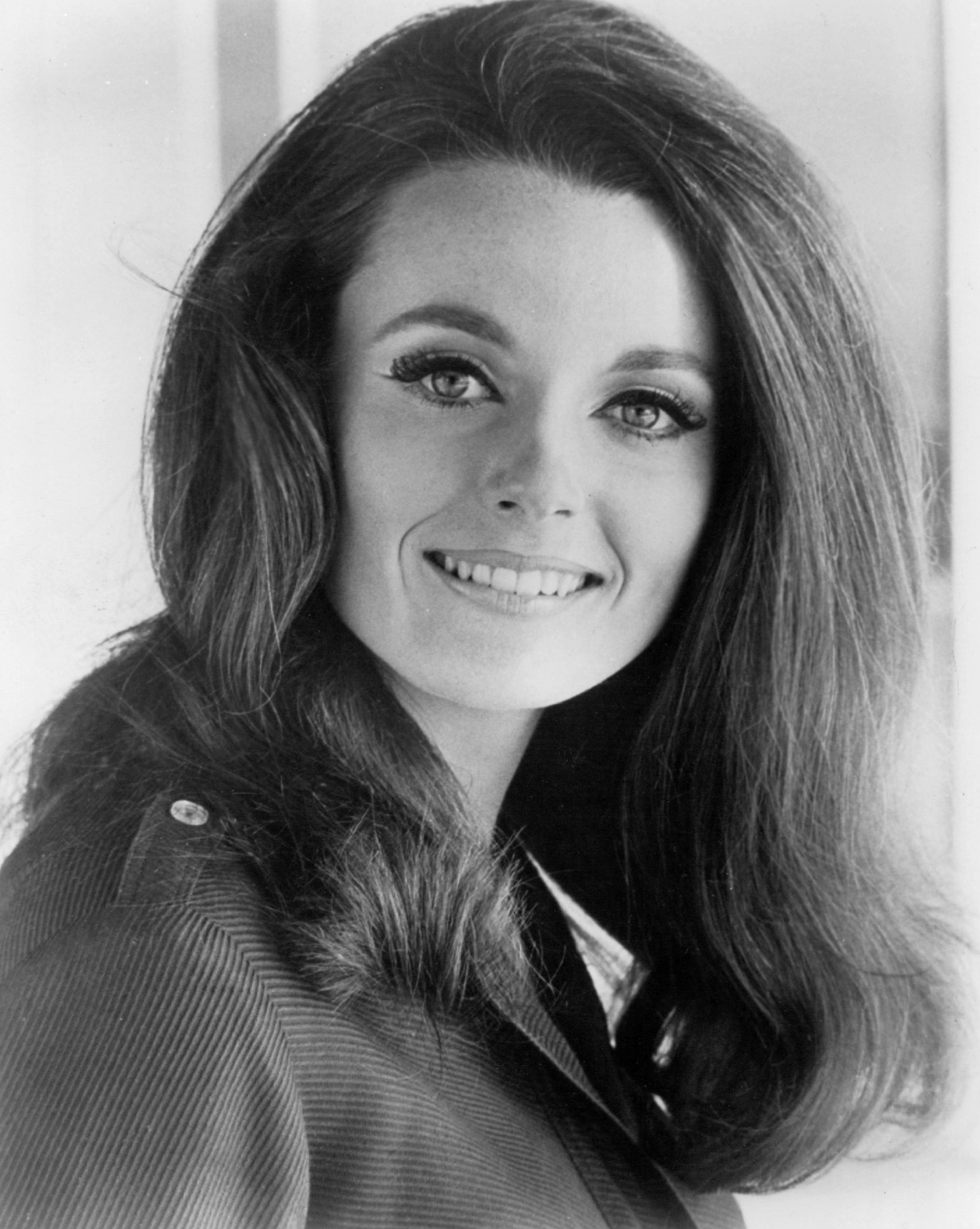
- Yarnall in 1967
- Born: Celeste Jeanne Yarnall; July 26, 1944; Long Beach, California, U.S.
- Died: October 7, 2018 (aged 74); Westlake Village, California, U.S.
- Occupations: Actress; model; real estate; author
- Years active: 1962–2018
- Known for: The Apple (Star Trek: The Original Series); Live a Little, Love a Little
- Spouses: Sheldon Silverstein (m. 1964; div. 1970); Robert Colman (m. 1979; div. 1990); Nazim Nazim (m. 2010)
- Children: 1
- Website: www.celesteyarnall.com

Celeste Jeanne Yarnall (July 26, 1944 – October 7, 2018) was an American actress primarily of the 1960s and 1970s. She started her career on television before moving to feature film roles.

== Career ==
A native of Long Beach, California, Yarnall was discovered by Ozzie Nelson and his son Ricky and appeared on their show The Adventures of Ozzie & Harriet. She was named Miss Rheingold 1964 (the last person to hold that title) while modeling and appearing in TV commercials. She made her film debut in The Nutty Professor (1963) and, after appearing at the 1967 Cannes Film Festival, was spotted by producer Harry Alan Towers, who scouted her to appear as the central character in his film Eve. She also appeared as a "Scream Queen" who is terrorized by a headless monster in the horror film Beast of Blood (1971).

Yarnall was known for her role as Yeoman Martha Landon in the Star Trek: The Original Series episode "The Apple" (1967), a character she would return to in the fan-made film Star Trek: Of Gods and Men (2006). She was cast in a small role opposite Elvis Presley in Live a Little, Love a Little (1968), as a party-goer wearing a glittery silver mini-dress and briefly a white fur coat, who captures Presley's attention and prompts him to sing "A Little Less Conversation". After she attended the Cannes Film Festival in 1968, the National Association of Theatre Owners named her "Most Promising New Star" for 1968, and the Foreign Press Corps named her "Most Photogenic Beauty of the Year". In 1971, she starred as the titular vampire in Stephanie Rothman's low-budget film The Velvet Vampire, of which Dave Kehr of the Chicago Reader said, "Given the genre (horror) and the budget (extremely low), it may seem perverse to say that Stephanie Rothman's 1971 film is among the best women's films ever made, but so it is."

== Personal life ==
From 1964 until 1970, Yarnall was married to Sheldon Silverstein, with whom she had her only child, a daughter, Camilla Yarnall, born in 1970. She was married from 1979 until 1990 to Robert Colman and, from 2010 until her death, to British artist Nazim Nazim.

== Later years and death ==
When her acting career diminished, Yarnall began to work in real estate. Despite warnings about limited opportunities for success, she earned a six-figure income in her first year with a real-estate firm. By 1982, she owned Celeste Yarnall & Associates, which a syndicated columnist described as "one of L.A.'s top office real-estate firms."

In 1998, Yarnall achieved a doctorate in nutrition, following which she taught nutrition at Pacific Western University. She also became a breeder of Tonkinese cats and wrote two books: Natural Dog Care: A Complete Guide to Holistic Care for Dogs and Natural Cat Care: A Complete Guide to Holistic Care for Cats. Yarnall attended Star Trek conventions where she signed autographs for fans.

Yarnall died at her home in Westlake Village, California on October 7, 2018, aged 74, from ovarian cancer, which she had been diagnosed with in 2014. She is buried at Forest Lawn Memorial Park in Glendale, California.

== Filmography ==
Film
Year	Title	Role	Notes
1963	The Nutty Professor	College Student	Uncredited
1963	A New Kind of Love		Uncredited
1963	Under the Yum Yum Tree	College Girl	Uncredited
1966	Around the World Under the Sea	Secretary	
1968	Eve	Eve	
1968	Live a Little, Love a Little	Ellen	
1969	Bob & Carol & Ted & Alice	Susan	
1970	Beast of Blood	Myra J. Russell	
1971	The Velvet Vampire	Diane LeFanu	
1972	The Mechanic	The Mark's Girl	
1973	Scorpio	Helen Thomas	
1987	Fatal Beauty	Laura	
1990	Shattered Dreams	Madge	
1990	Funny About Love	Madge	
1991	Driving Me Crazy	Volvo Boss	
1991	Driving Me Crazy	Beverly Hills Shopper	
1993	Born Yesterday	Mrs. Hedges	
1993	Midnight Kiss	Sheila	
2003	Shrink Rap	Gloria	
2005	Skinwalker: Curse of the Shaman	Gwynn Stevens	Video
2007	The Two Sisters	Nurse Louise Brennan	
2007	Star Trek: Of Gods and Men	Special Wedding Guest	Video
2012	Elvis Found Alive	Celeste Yarnall	
2018	Unbelievable!!!!!	Celeste Yarnall	
Television
Year	Title	Role	Notes
1962	The Adventures of Ozzie & Harriet	Girl	Episode: "Rick and the Maid of Honor"
1962-1963	My Three Sons	Ginny Stewart	2 episodes
1966	The Man from U.N.C.L.E.	Andrea Fouchet	Episode: "The Monks of St. Thomas Affair"
1966	Bewitched	Student Nurse	Episode: "And Then There Were Three"
1967	Star Trek: The Original Series	Yeoman Martha Landon	Episode: "The Apple"
1968	It Takes a Thief	Ilsa	Episode: "Locked in the Cradle of the Keep"
1968	The F.B.I.	Julie	Episode: "The Mercenary"
1968	Hogan's Heroes	Nanny / Wilhelmina	2 episodes
1968	Land of the Giants	Marna Whelan	Episode: "The Golden Cage"
1968	Bonanza	Katie Kelly	Episode: "Queen High"
1969	Mannix	Tawny	Episode: "Eagles Sometimes Can’t Fly"
1969	The Survivors		Episode: "Chapter One"
1969	In Name Only	Anne	Television film
1969	The Bold Ones: The Protectors	Ethel Miller	Episode: "Draw a Straight Man"
1971	Ransom for a Dead Man	Gloria	Columbo Television film Ransom for a Dead Man
1971	Insight	Viola (as Celeste Yarnell)	Episode: "Bird on the Mast"
1972	The Judge and Jake Wyler	Ballerina	Television film
1972	McMillan & Wife	Miss Jones	Episode: "Terror Times Two"
1973	Love, American Style	Florence (segment "Love and the Postal Meeter"	Episode: "Love and the End of the Line / Love and the Growing Romance / Love and the Postal Meeter"
1990	Knots Landing	Caroline Craig	Episode: "My First Born"
1991	Daughters of Privilege	Beautiful Woman	Television film
1993	Civil Wars	Gwendolyn	Episode "Split Ends"
1994	Sisters	Rita Zaylor	Episode: "Chemical Reactions"
1995	Melrose Place	Mrs. Pemberton	Episode: "Oy! to the World"
1998	Melrose Place	Mrs. Huntington	Episode: "Amanda's Back"
