= Shadow Fury =

2001 film

- Directed by: Makoto Yokoyama
- Written by: Makoto Yokoyama; Eric Koyanagi
- Produced by: Taka Arai
- Starring: Sam Bottoms; Masakatsu Funaki; Alexandra Kamp; Bas Rutten; Fred Williamson; Pat Morita; Taylor Lautner
- Cinematography: Blain Brown
- Edited by: Nina Kawasaki
- Music by: Shinnosuke Sorimachi
- Distributed by: Lionsgate Films; Phaedra Cinema
- Release date: October 30, 2001
- Countries: Japan; United States

Shadow Fury is an action/science-fiction film released in Japan on October 30, 2001, starring Sam Bottoms. It is the feature film debut of both Taylor Lautner and Jennette McCurdy.

== Plot ==
A discovery in the near future makes it possible to create genetically engineered and enhanced human clones. The consequence of this discovery results in bio-ethical chaos. In order to right this wrong, the World Health Organization imposes a global ban on all human cloning activity. A group of scientists at the Nova Corporation, a leader in cloning research, have made miraculous advances in the replication of human beings. When one of their colleagues, a mad scientist by the name of Dr. Oh (Morita), creates an "Obedience Strain" that will allow him mind control over the clones, Nova Corp casts him out and revokes his license. Dr. Oh vows revenge on his three partners, Drs. Markov, Forster and Hillier, and creates a clone that is the perfect killing machine, Takeru (Funaki), a killer ninja clone. Meanwhile, Nova Corp learns of Dr. Oh's plan and dispatches a bounty hunter, Madsen (Bottoms), to destroy Dr. Oh, Dr. Oh's laboratory and any clones he may have developed. Madsen has his work cut out for him because with Takeru on the loose, it's only a matter of time before the clone finds them all!

== Cast ==
- Taylor Lautner as Kismet (child)
- Sam Bottoms as Mitchell Madsen
- Masakatsu Funaki as Takeru
- Alexandra Kamp as Dr. Louise Forster
- Bas Rutten as Kismet (adult)
- Fred Williamson as Sam
- Pat Morita as Dr. Oh
- Jennette McCurdy as Anna Markov
