= Conquest of the Air =

1936 British aviation film

- Directed by: Zoltan Korda; John Monk Saunders; Alexander Esway; William Cameron Menzies; Alexander Shaw; Peter Bezencenet
- Written by: John Monk Saunders; Hugh Gray; Antoine de Saint-Exupéry
- Produced by: Alexander Korda
- Starring: Laurence Olivier
- Narrated by: Charles Frend
- Cinematography: Wilkie Cooper; George Noble; Hans Schneeberger; Lee Garmes
- Edited by: Peter Bezencenet; Charles Frend; Richard Q. McNaughton
- Music by: Arthur Bliss
- Production company: Alexander Korda Productions
- Distributed by: London Films (UK)
- Release date: 1931
- Running time: 71 minutes
- Country: United Kingdom
- Language: English

Conquest of the Air is a 1931 documentary film or docudrama on the history of aviation up to that time. The film features historical footage, and dramatic re-creations, of the developments of commercial and military aviation; including the early stages of technological developments in design, propulsion, and air navigation aids. The film was a London Films production, commissioned by the British Air Ministry.

== Cast ==
- Frederick Culley as Roger Bacon
- Laurence Olivier as Vincent Lunardi
- Franklin Dyall as Jerome de Ascoli
- Henry Victor as Otto Lilienthal
- Hay Petrie as Tiberius Cavallo
- John Turnbull as Ferdinand Von Zeppelin
- Charles Lefeaux as Louis Bleriot
- Bryan Powley as Sir George Cayley
- Alan Wheatley as Giovanni Alfonso Borelli
- John Abbott as Jean-François Pilâtre de Rozier
- Michael Rennie as Marquis d'Arlandes (uncredited)

== Production background ==
The film was initially commissioned by Alexander Korda prior to the advent of World War II, and the Air Ministry saw the value in promoting Britain's contribution and leadership in aviation during this period. Some notable footage is featured of the early phases of automated flight, navigational equipment, and the transitions between civil and military developments, including heavy bombers; fast fighter aircraft; and the advent of naval aviation (aircraft carrier), plus the initial experiments with vertical rotary flight (helicopters).

An updated version was released in 1936 and released in the United States on 20 May 1940.

== See also ==
- List of films in the public domain in the United States
