= Sumuru =

Fictional femme fatale

- Created by: Sax Rohmer
- Portrayed by: Shirley Eaton; Alexandra Kamp

In-universe information
- Full name: Sumuru
- Gender: Female
- Occupation: Supervillainess
- Nationality: Japanese

Sumuru /ˈsuːməruː/ is a female supervillain created by Sax Rohmer, author of the Fu Manchu series of novels. She first appeared in a 1945–1946 BBC radio serial, which was rewritten as a novel in 1950. Four more novels were published between 1951 and 1956. Two movies were then made in the 1960s and one more in 2003.

== Character biography and analysis ==
Like her criminal mastermind forerunner Dr. Fu Manchu, the beautiful Sumuru leads a secret organization aimed at taking control of the world. Sumuru's society, the Order of Our Lady, recruits beautiful women to seduce and exploit men in order to establish a matriarchal world order.

== Radio ==
After the end of World War II, Rohmer was approached by the BBC to do a radio serial. As the BBC did not wish to offend the Republic of China (Britain's ally in the war), Rohmer used the same basic plots with a female mastermind named Sumuru. The series Shadow of Sumuru was broadcast from 1945-1946 on the BBC Light Programme in eight half-hour shows with Anna Burden and Robert Beatty in the cast.

== Novels ==
In 1950, Rohmer published his radio serial as a novel entitled The Sins of Sumuru. The American Fawcett Gold Medal paperback publishing house printed it under the title Nude in Mink, against Rohmer's wishes. When the book went into a second printing in a month's time, the publisher commissioned a book series, with the first four books having different titles in the U.K. and the U.S.

- The Sins of Sumuru (U.K.) / Nude in Mink (U.S.) (1950)
- The Slaves of Sumuru (U.K.) / Sumuru (U.S.) (1951)
- Virgin in Flames (U.K.) / The Fire Goddess (U.S.) (1952)
- Sand and Satin (U.K.) / Return of Sumuru (U.S.) (1954)
- Sinister Madonna (U.S. and U.K.) (1956)
- The Sumuru Omnibus (2011) compiled by John Robert Colombo

At the request of his American publishers, Rohmer added more explicit sexual content in the Sumuru series than was seen in his previous works. The Fawcett editors also made some textual changes in some of their editions. For instance, the ending of The Slaves of Sumuru is significantly altered in its Fawcett edition (Sumuru). In The Fire Goddess (U.S. edition of Virgin in Flames) one important paragraph of text is omitted by the Fawcett editors. Bookfinger restored Rohmer's texts in their editions published later.

Anthony Boucher described the 1954 instalment as "melodrama almost as entertainingly Perelmanesque as the exploits of the evil Doctor." He later praised Sinister Madonna as "outrageously enjoyable", describing it as "critically indefensible, but my God, such fun . . . !"

On the other hand, the 1988 Dictionary of Literary Biography found Rohmer's work wanting: "The Sumuru novels are second-rate, in some cases thematic recyclings of earlier, better, work. Unlike the Fu Manchu books, they contain no main protagonist in the mold of Nayland Smith, although the hero of [the 1929 novel] The Emperor of America is a continuing character. Broken by Sumuru, he struggles back in the final Sumuru novel, Sinister Madonna, which ends on an uncertain note and with the promise of a sequel which was not to be."

== Films ==
Harry Alan Towers, who had produced the Fu Manchu film series in the mid-1960s with Christopher Lee, produced his first two Sumuru films featuring Shirley Eaton as Sumuru. Years later, he produced yet another Sumuru film in 2003. The third film took its basic plot premise from the books, but set it in the far future.

- The Million Eyes of Sumuru (1967), starring Shirley Eaton and directed by Lindsay Shonteff
- The Girl from Rio (1969), starring Shirley Eaton and directed by Jess Franco
- Sumuru (2003), starring Alexandra Kamp and directed by Darrell Roodt

It has been noted that in The Million Eyes of Sumuru, the character's matriarchal goals are subverted by the filmmakers' insistence on ultimately upholding traditional gender roles: "Sumuru... leads an all-girl cult that rejects marriage as male-dominated and focuses on breeding children without benefit of clergy in order to build a new civilization. The movie turns all of this into a Bond knockoff right down to Sumuru -- who decrees that execution is the punishment for her followers who fall in love -- melting into West's arms and telling him she needs a man to take her and dominate her."

The 1969 sequel also undercut the character's gynarchic agenda by bowing to current fashion: "In [Jesús] Franco's The Girl from Rio, Sumuru and her Amazons are transported to the future city of "Femina", actually Brazil's own future city, Brasília. Once more the core business is the seduction, financial ruin and destruction of her rich male victims. However, herein Carnaby Street plastic capes and "kinky boots" are the order of the day. But in attempting '60s kitsch, Franco fails to hit the mark."

== See also ==
- Yellow Peril
