= 99 Women =

1969 film

- U.S. theatrical release poster
- Directed by: Jesús Franco
- Screenplay by: Jesús Franco; Carlo Fadda; Milo G. Cuccia
- Story by: Jesús Franco
- Produced by: Harry Alan Towers; Carlos Couret; Alexander Hacohhen
- Starring: Maria Schell; Mercedes McCambridge; Luciana Paluzzi; Herbert Lom
- Cinematography: Manuel Merino
- Edited by: Bruno Mattei; Hans Zeiler
- Music by: Bruno Nicolai
- Production companies: Hesperia Films; Corona Filmproduktion; Cineproduzioni Associate; Towers of London; Commonwealth United Productions
- Distributed by: Paramount Films de Espana (Madrid); Nora FIlm (Munich); Filmar Compagnia Cinematografica (Rome); Commonwealth United Entertainment (Los Angeles)
- Release dates: March 5, 1969 (San Francisco); March 14, 1969 (West Germany); June 16, 1969 (Madrid); June 18, 1969 (Rome)
- Running time: 90 minutes
- Countries: Spain; West Germany; Italy; United Kingdom; United States

99 Women (German: Der heiße Tod, lit. 'The Hot Death') is a 1969 women in prison film directed by Jesús Franco and starring Maria Schell, Mercedes McCambridge, Maria Rohm, Rosalba Neri, Luciana Paluzzi and Herbert Lom. One of the earliest and most financially successful examples of the genre, it was produced by Harry Alan Towers as an international co-production.

The script was purchased from Robert L. Lippert.

== Plot ==
New inmate Marie arrives at an island prison in the women's sector and receives the number 99. The inmates are controlled by the sadistic lesbian warden Thelma Diaz and Governor Santos and submitted to torture, rape, sexual harassment and abuse. When the Justice minister replaces Diaz, Marie believes that her life will improve and her case will be reopened. Marie's disappointed with the new warden and plans to escape. But their scheme fails and the abuse they've undergone had been but a paltry hint of the torture in store.

== Cast ==
- Maria Rohm as Marie, #99
- Mercedes McCambridge as Thelma Diaz
- Maria Schell as Leonie Caroll
- Herbert Lom as Governor Santos
- Rosalba Neri as Zoie, #76
- Elisa Montes as Helga, #97
- Valentina Godoy as Rosalie, #81
- Luciana Paluzzi as Natalie Mendoza, #98

Uncredited:

- José Maria Blanco as Doctor
- Juan Antonio Riquelme as Juan Diego
- Claudia Gravy as Carla
- Ana Lucarella as Marta
- Elsa Zabala as Official
- Mike Brendel as Boatman
- Jesús Franco as Official

== Release ==
99 Women was released in San Francisco on March 5, 1969 with a runtime of 84 minutes. This was followed by screenings in West Germany on March 14, 1969 as Der heiße Tod (transl. Hot Death) at 108 minutes, Madrid on June 16, 1969 as 99 mujeres at 78 minutes and then Rome on July 18, 1969 as 99 donne at 108 minutes.

On February 22, 2005, Blue Underground released an unrated DVD of the English-language director's cut featuring an interview and talent biography with Franco, deleted and alternate scenes, a poster and still gallery and the film's trailer. Alongside this, an X-rated release of the French version, featuring eight minutes of hardcore shots featuring actors not part of the film's main production was also made available.

== Reception ==
From contemporary reviews, an anonymous reviewer in the Monthly Film Bulletin reviewed a 70-minute version. The reviewer found it to be a "Crude women's prison melodrama" with a "turgid script that rambles coyly on about lesbianism, flogging and the kinky pleasures of the Governor of a men's prison", concluding that the film was "all very tame and unremittingly tedious”.
