= Peter Bezencenet =

British film director (1914–2003)

- Born: 15 June 1914; Rochford, Essex, England, UK
- Died: September 2003 (aged 89); Westminster, London, England, UK
- Occupations: Director, Editor
- Years active: 1936–1965 (film)

Peter Bezencenet (1914–2003) was a British film editor and film director. He co-scripted the 1936 film Conquest of the Air. He was employed by the Rank Organisation on a number of films during the 1950s, including several for Ealing Studios. He also acted as location director for the television series Richard the Lionheart in the early 1960s. During the 1960s he directed four films and episodes of the TV series The Pursuers.

== Selected filmography ==
- Conquest of the Air (1936)
- Floodtide (1949)
- Poet's Pub (1949)
- Intimate Relations (1953)
- The Square Ring (1953)
- The Divided Heart (1954)
- West of Zanzibar (1954)
- The Ship That Died of Shame (1955)
- The Feminine Touch (1956)
- Dangerous Exile (1957)
- The Secret Place (1957)
- Rooney (1958)
- Floods of Fear (1958)
- Jack the Ripper (1959)
- Tommy the Toreador (1959)
- The Siege of Sidney Street (1960)
- Jungle Street (1961)
- Dangerous Afternoon (1961)
- Band of Thieves (1962)
- Hair of the Dog (1962)
- Bomb in the High Street (1963)
- 24 Hours to Kill (1965)
- City of Fear (1965)

== Bibliography ==
- Burton, Alan & O'Sullivan, Tim. The Cinema of Basil Dearden and Michael Relph. Edinburgh University Press, 2009.
- Morley, Margaret. The Films of Laurence Olivier. Citadel Press, 1978.
