= Questa volta parliamo di uomini =

- Directed by: Lina Wertmüller
- Written by: Lina Wertmüller
- Produced by: Pietro Notarianni
- Starring: Nino Manfredi; Luciana Paluzzi; Margaret Lee; Milena Vukotic
- Cinematography: Ennio Guarnieri
- Edited by: Ruggero Mastroianni
- Music by: Luis Enríquez Bacalov
- Release date: 1965
- Running time: 91 minutes
- Country: Italy
- Language: Italian

Questa volta parliamo di uomini (This Time Let's Talk about Men or Let's Talk About Men) is a 1965 Italian tragicomedy film directed by Lina Wertmüller and starring Nino Manfredi. The film was shot in black and white and in 35mm and lasted 91 minutes.

== Cast ==
- Nino Manfredi
- Luciana Paluzzi
- Milena Vukotic
- Margaret Lee
- Alfredo Bianchini
- Giulio Coltellacci
- Patrizia De Clara

== Reception ==
The film has been described as a "blatantly commercial venture in four episodes". An "episodic comedy", it is described as a "caustic satire of Italian masculinity" and Wertmüller's only truly feminist film. It has been described as a "populist farce based on a showy yet tame feminism."
