= Maria Rohm =

Austrian actress (1945–2018)

- Born: Helga Grohmann; 13 August 1945; Vienna, Austria
- Died: 18 June 2018 (aged 72); Toronto, Ontario, Canada
- Occupations: Actress, film producer
- Spouse: Harry Alan Towers (m. 1964; died 2009)

Maria Rohm (13 August 1945 – 18 June 2018) was an Austrian actress and producer.

== Biography ==
Born Helga Grohmann in Vienna, she started her acting career at the very young age, working at the famous Viennese Burgtheatre as a child actor from ages 4 through 13. She continued her theatrical work until the age of 18, when she auditioned for British film producer Harry Alan Towers, whom she would later marry. Working with Towers, she became famous for appearing in a number of films directed by Jesús Franco in the late 1960s, including Venus in Furs, The Bloody Judge, and Count Dracula.

== Personal life ==
Rohm remained married to Towers from 1964 until his death in 2009. She retired from acting in 1976, but continued to produce independent films.

== Death ==
Rohm died in Toronto on 18 June 2018 at 72. She had been hospitalized for paralysis in the legs after collapsing to the ground. The tests led to the discovery of acute leukemia and a tumor pressing against her spine (which caused the paralysis), although Rohm remained convinced that she was suffering from sciatica. Her condition rapidly deteriorated and she died a few days after entering the hospital.

== Filmography ==
Year	Title	Role	Notes
1964	Teufel im Fleisch	Prostitute	
1964	Mozambique		Uncredited
1965	Twenty-Four Hours to Kill	Claudine	
1965	City of Fear	Maid	
1966	Our Man in Marrakesh	Woman in Carriage	Uncredited
1967	Five Golden Dragons	Ingrid	
1967	The Million Eyes of Sumuru	Helga	
1967	The Vengeance of Fu Manchu	Ingrid	
1967	The House of 1,000 Dolls	Diane	Worked with Vincent Price
1968	Eve	Anne	
1968	The Blood of Fu Manchu	Ursula Wagner	
1968	99 Women	Marie	
1969	The Girl from Rio (aka Die sieben Männer der Sumuru)	Leslye	
1969	Marquis de Sade: Justine	Juliette	
1969	Venus in Furs	Wanda Reed	
1970	Eugenie… The Story of Her Journey into Perversion	Madame Saint Ange	
1970	The Bloody Judge	Mary Gray	
1970	Count Dracula	Mina Murray	
1970	Dorian Gray	Alice Campbell	
1971	Black Beauty	Anne Piggot	
1972	Sex Charade		never released
1972	Treasure Island	Mrs. Hawkins	worked with Orson Welles
1972	Call of the Wild	Mercedes	worked with Charlton Heston
1974	And Then There Were None	Elsa Martino	
1975	The Killer is Not Alone	Teresa	
1975	Closed Up-Tight		
1976	Blue Belle	Marie	(final film role)
