= Mercedes McCambridge =

American actress (1916–2004)

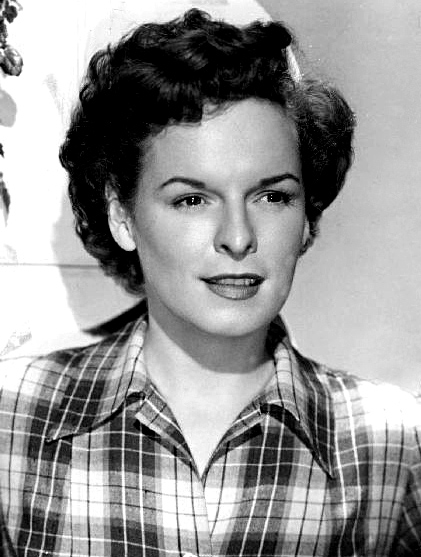
- McCambridge in All the King's Men (1949)
- Born: Carlotta Mercedes Agnes McCambridge; March 16, 1916; Joliet, Illinois, U.S.
- Died: March 2, 2004 (aged 87); San Diego, California, U.S.
- Education: Mundelein College
- Occupation: Actress
- Years active: 1938–1988
- Spouses: William Fifield (m. 1939; div. 1946); Fletcher Markle (m. 1950; div. 1962)
- Children: 1

Carlotta Mercedes Agnes McCambridge (March 16, 1916 – March 2, 2004) was an American actress. Orson Welles called her "the world's greatest living radio actress". She won an Academy Award for Best Supporting Actress for her screen debut in All the King's Men (1949) and was nominated in the same category for Giant (1956). She voiced the majority of dialogue for demon Pazuzu in The Exorcist (1973).

== Early life ==
McCambridge was born in Joliet, Illinois, the daughter of Irish-American Catholic parents Marie (née Mahaffry) and John Patrick McCambridge, a farmer. She graduated from Mundelein College in Chicago.

== Career ==
=== Radio ===
McCambridge began her career as a radio actress in 1938 while also performing on Broadway. In 1941, she played Judy's friend in A Date with Judy. She had the title role in Defense Attorney, a crime drama broadcast on ABC in 1951–52. Her other work on radio included:

- episodes of Lights Out (including "It Happened", November 5, 1938; "Execution", April 27, 1943, and "The Word", September 14, 1943)
- episodes of Inner Sanctum (including "Blood of Cain", January 29, 1946, "Death's Old Sweet Song", April 11, 1946, "But the Dead Walk Alone" (December 2, 1946). and "'Til Death Do Us Part", October 27, 1947)
- episodes of the Bulldog Drummond radio series
- episodes of Gang Busters
- episodes of Murder at Midnight (including "The Man with the Black Beard", August 5, 1950)
- episodes of Studio One (including "Anthony Adverse", October 14, 1947; "Kitty Foyle", April 11, 1947, and "The Thirty-Nine Steps", March 28, 1948)
- episode of Alfred Hitchcock Presents as Dr. Constance Petersen in Spellbound
- episodes of Screen Directors Playhouse (including "Spellbound", January 25, 1951, and "Only Yesterday", May 7, 1951)
- episodes of Ford Theater (including "The Horn Blows at Midnight", April 3, 1949)
- Rosemary Levy on Abie's Irish Rose
- Peggy King Martinson on This Is Nora Drake (1948)
- various characters on the radio series I Love A Mystery in both its West Coast and East Coast incarnations (including The Stewardess and Charity Martin in The Thing That Cries in the Night, Nasha and Laura in Bury Your Dead, Arizona, Sunny Richards in both The Million Dollar Curse and The Temple of Vampires and Jack "Jacqueline" Dempsey Ross in The Battle of the Century)

She frequently performed feature roles on the CBS Radio Mystery Theater, and was an original cast member on Guiding Light (before the Bauers took over as the central characters). She also starred in her own show, Defense Attorney, on ABC 1951–52, as Martha Ellis Bryan.

From June 22, 1953, to March 5, 1954, she starred in the soap opera Family Skeleton on CBS.

=== Television ===
McCambridge played Katherine Wells in Wire Service, a drama series that aired on ABC during 1956–57, produced by Desilu Productions. The series starred McCambridge, George Brent, and Dane Clark as reporters for the fictional Trans Globe Wire Service.

In the season one episode of the original Lost in Space series "The Space Croppers", aired on CBS in March 1966, McCambridge played Sybilla, the matriarch of a family of supernatural space farmers.

In an episode of Bewitched titled "Darrin Gone! and Forgotten," which aired on ABC in October 1968, McCambridge played a powerful witch named Carlotta (McCambridge's real first name), a frenemy of Endora. Endora and Carlotta had made a pact "at the turn of the century" that their first-born children would one day marry. When, according to the pact terms, certain celestial phenomena signaled it was time for the marriage, Carlotta (McCambridge) disappeared Darrin and pushed for Samantha to marry her coddled son Juke (played by veteran character actor Steve Franken).

=== Film ===
McCambridge's film career took off when she was cast as Sadie Burke opposite Broderick Crawford in All the King's Men (1949). McCambridge won the 1949 Academy Award for Best Supporting Actress for the role, while the film won Best Picture for that year. McCambridge also won the Golden Globe Awards for Best Supporting Actress and New Star of the Year – Actress for her performance.

In 1954, she co-starred with Joan Crawford and Sterling Hayden in the offbeat western drama, Johnny Guitar, now regarded as a cult classic. McCambridge and Hayden publicly declared their dislike of Crawford, with McCambridge labeling her "a mean, tipsy, powerful, rotten-egg lady."

McCambridge played the supporting role of Luz in the George Stevens classic Giant (1956), which starred Elizabeth Taylor, Rock Hudson, and James Dean. She was nominated for another Academy Award as Best Supporting Actress but lost to Dorothy Malone in Written on the Wind. In 1959, McCambridge appeared opposite Katharine Hepburn, Montgomery Clift and Elizabeth Taylor in the Joseph L. Mankiewicz film adaptation of Tennessee Williams' Suddenly, Last Summer.

McCambridge appeared as a leather jacket-wearing hoodlum in Touch of Evil, reuniting with her former radio colleague Orson Welles, who directed the 1958 film.

McCambridge provided the dubbed voice of Pazuzu, the demon possessing the young girl Regan (played by Linda Blair) in The Exorcist. To sound as disturbing as possible, McCambridge insisted on swallowing raw eggs, chain smoking and drinking whiskey to make her voice harsh and her performance aggressive. Director William Friedkin also arranged for her to be bound to a chair during recordings, so that the demon seemed to be struggling against its restraints. Friedkin claimed that she initially requested no credit for the film—fearing it would take away from the attention of Blair's performance—but later complained about her absence of credit during the film's premiere. Her dispute with Friedkin and the Warner Bros. over her exclusion ended when, with the help of the Screen Actors Guild, she was properly credited for her vocal work in the film.

In the 1970s, she toured in a road company production of Cat on a Hot Tin Roof as Big Mama, opposite John Carradine as Big Daddy.

McCambridge appeared as a guest artist in college productions. In May 1977, she helped dedicate the theater building of El Centro College by starring in a production of The Madwoman of Chaillot. Director Eddie Thomas had known her for many years and she conducted an actors' workshop for the college students during the week prior to the opening night. She returned in 1979 for El Centre's production of The Mousetrap, in which she received top billing despite her character being murdered (by actor Jim Beaver) fewer than 15 minutes into the play. She also starred with longtime character actor Lyle Talbot (of ABC's The Adventures of Ozzie and Harriet) in the 1970 production of Come Back, Little Sheba in the University of North Alabama Summer Theatre Productions.

In the mid-1970s, McCambridge briefly took a position as director of Livengrin, a Pennsylvania rehabilitation center for alcoholics. She was at the same time putting the finishing touches on her soon-to-be released autobiography, The Quality of Mercy: An Autobiography (Times Books, 1981), ISBN 0-8129-0945-3.

== Personal life and death ==
McCambridge married her first husband, William Fifield, a writer, in 1939. They had a son, John Lawrence Fifield, born in December 1941. The couple divorced in 1946 after seven years of marriage.

In 1950, McCambridge married Canadian Fletcher Markle, an actor/producer/director who directed her in productions on Ford Theater and Studio One. Her son, John, later took Markle's name, thereafter being known as John Markle. During the marriage and afterward, McCambridge battled alcoholism, often being hospitalized after episodes of heavy drinking. She and Markle divorced in 1962, after twelve years of marriage. Although an admirer of Alcoholics Anonymous, she achieved sobriety without being a member because one of their core principles is anonymity. Dick Van Dyke, who also experienced alcoholism, credited McCambridge in 1974 for having "broke the ice for the rest of us" by speaking openly about her addiction, enabling other celebrities such as himself to be more publicly honest about their struggles.

From 1975 to 1982, McCambridge devoted her time to the nonprofit Livengrin Foundation of Bensalem, Pennsylvania. She first served as a volunteer member of the Board of Directors, then as president and CEO, responsible for the day-to-day operations of the treatment center, which at the time was a 76-bed residential program for both male and female alcoholics. Livengrin still operates today, and has 129 beds and eight outpatient clinics throughout southeastern Pennsylvania, treating both alcoholism and drug addiction. McCambridge, through her celebrity and larger-than-life personality, helped bring public recognition to, and acceptance of the disease of addiction, as well as the benefits of seeking treatment for the disease. She freely shared her own story of addiction and recovery as a means of reaching others in need of help.

She was an outspoken liberal Democrat who campaigned for Adlai Stevenson.

McCambridge died on March 2, 2004, at age 87 in La Jolla in San Diego, California, of natural causes.

=== Family tragedy ===
McCambridge's son John Markle, a UCLA graduate with a PhD in Economics, joined the Little Rock, Arkansas, investment firm Stephens Inc. in 1979, after working for Salomon Brothers in New York City. Markle was a successful futures trader, and quickly rose through the company's ranks. McCambridge gave Markle $604,000 ($2.1 million in 2024) to manage for her, but in the fall of 1987, the company discovered that Markle had opened a secret account in McCambridge's name. Soon the company found that Markle had been charging trading losses to the Stephens house account, while crediting profitable trades to McCambridge's account. Markle was later shown to have forged his mother's signature in opening the account.

Markle was placed on medical leave, then fired from his position at Stephens. McCambridge refused to cooperate with Markle and the company in instituting a repayment scheme that would have kept the matter from becoming public, saying that she had done nothing wrong and that Stephens Inc. owed her money. Shortly thereafter, in November 1987, Markle killed his family—his wife Christine, 45, and daughters Amy, 13, and Suzanne, 9—and then himself. He left a note taking responsibility for his crimes and a long, bitter letter to his mother. The letter contained the following: "Initially you said, 'well, we can work it out' but NO, you refused… You called me a liar, a cheat, a criminal, a bum. You said I have ruined your life… You were never around much when I needed you, so now I and my whole family are dead—so you can have the money… 'Night, Mother."

In 1986, McCambridge had played the mother of a child who plans to take their own life in an Arkansas Repertory Theatre production of 'night, Mother.

== Legacy ==
For her contributions to television and the motion picture industry, Mercedes McCambridge has two stars on the Hollywood Walk of Fame: one for motion pictures at 1722 Vine Street, and one for television at 6243 Hollywood Boulevard.

== Filmography ==
Year	Title	Role	Notes
1949	All the King's Men	Sadie Burke	Academy Award for Best Supporting Actress; Golden Globe Award for Best Supporting Actress; Golden Globe Award for Most Promising Newcomer – Female
1951	Inside Straight	Ada Stritch	
1951	The Scarf	Connie Carter	
1951	Lightning Strikes Twice	Liza McStringer	
1951	Screen Snapshots: Hollywood Awards	Herself	Short subject
1954	Johnny Guitar	Emma Small	
1955	Front Row Center	Nicole Diver	Episode: "Tender is the Night"
1956	Giant	Luz Benedict	Nominated – Academy Award for Best Supporting Actress
1957	A Farewell to Arms	Miss Van Campen	
1957	Wagon Train	Emily Rossiter	Episode: "The Emily Rossiter Story"
1958	Touch of Evil	Gang leader	Uncredited
1959	Suddenly, Last Summer	Mrs. Grace Holly	
1960	Rawhide	Mrs Martha Mushgrove	S3:E9, "Incident of the Captive"
1960	Rawhide	Mrs Miller	Episode: "Incident of the Curious Street"
1959	Riverboat	Jessie Quinn	Episode: "Jessie Quinn"
1960	Cimarron	Mrs. Sarah Wyatt	
1961	Angel Baby	Sarah Strand	
1962	Rawhide	Ada Randolph	Episode: "The Greedy Town"
1962	Bonanza	Deborah Banning	Episode: "The Lady from Baltimore"
1963	The Dakotas	Jay French	Episode: "Trouble at French Creek"
1965	Run Home, Slow	Nell Hagen	
1965	Rawhide	Ma Gufler	Episode: "Hostage for Hanging"
1966	Lost in Space	Sybilla	Episode: "The Space Croppers"
1968	The Counterfeit Killer	Frances	
1968	Bewitched	Carlotta	Episode: "Darrin Gone! and Forgotten?"
1969	99 Women	Thelma Diaz	
1969	Justine	Madame Dusbois	
1970	Bonanza	Matilda Curtis	Episode: "The Law and Billy Burgess"
1971	Gunsmoke	Rubilee Mather	Episode: "The Lost"
1971	The Last Generation		(archive footage)
1972	Sixteen	Ma Irtley	
1973	The President's Plane Is Missing	Hester Madigan	TV movie
1973	The Exorcist	Pazuzu	Voice
1975	Who Is the Black Dahlia?	Grandmother	TV movie
1977	Thieves	Street Lady	
1978	Charlie's Angels	Norma	Episode: "Angels in Springtime"
1978	Flying High	Claire	Episode: "In the Still of the Night"
1979	The Concorde... Airport '79	Nelli	
1979	The Sacketts	Ma Sackett	TV movie
1981	Magnum, P.I.	Agatha Kimball	Episode: "Don't Say Goodbye"
1982	Echoes	Lillian Gerben	
1986	Amazing Stories	Miss Lestrange	Voice, Episode: "Family Dog"
1988	Cagney & Lacey	Sister Elizabeth	Episode: "Land of the Free"
2018	The Other Side of the Wind	Maggie	Previously unreleased (final film role)

== Awards and nominations ==
Year	Award	Category	Nominated work	Results	Ref.
1949	Academy Awards	Best Supporting Actress	All the King's Men	Won	
1956	Academy Awards	Best Supporting Actress	Giant	Nominated	
1949	Golden Globe Awards	Best Supporting Actress – Motion Picture	All the King's Men	Won	
1949	Golden Globe Awards	Most Promising Newcomer – Female	All the King's Men	Won	
1956	Laurel Awards	Top Female Supporting Performance	Giant	Nominated	
1972	Tony Awards	Best Supporting or Featured Actress in a Play	The Love Suicide at Schofield Barracks	Nominated	
