= Commonwealth United Entertainment =

Defunct American film production and distribution company

- Trade name: Commonwealth United
- Industry: Filmed entertainment
- Defunct: 1971; 55 years ago
- Fate: Broken up and sold to National Telefilm Associates
- Key people: Milton T. Raynor
- Owner: Milton T. Raynor (–1967)
- Parent: Commonwealth United Corporation (1967–1971)

Commonwealth United Entertainment (generally referred to as Commonwealth United; abbreviated as CUE), formerly known as Television Enterprises Corporation (abbreviated as TEC), was a short-lived American film and TV production and distribution company active from the early-mid 1960s until 1971. It was headed by Milton T. Raynor.

The company was sometimes considered one of the "instant majors" of the late 1960s. (Note: Page 10.) Its parent company briefly operated a record label, Commonwealth United Records (abbreviated as CUR), as well as a TV production and distribution company, Commonwealth United Television (abbreviated as CUT). It produced films through its in-house film studio, Commonwealth United Productions (abbreviated as CUP), which would eventually become Commonwealth United Pictures (abbreviated as CUP).

== History ==
Commonwealth United Corporation
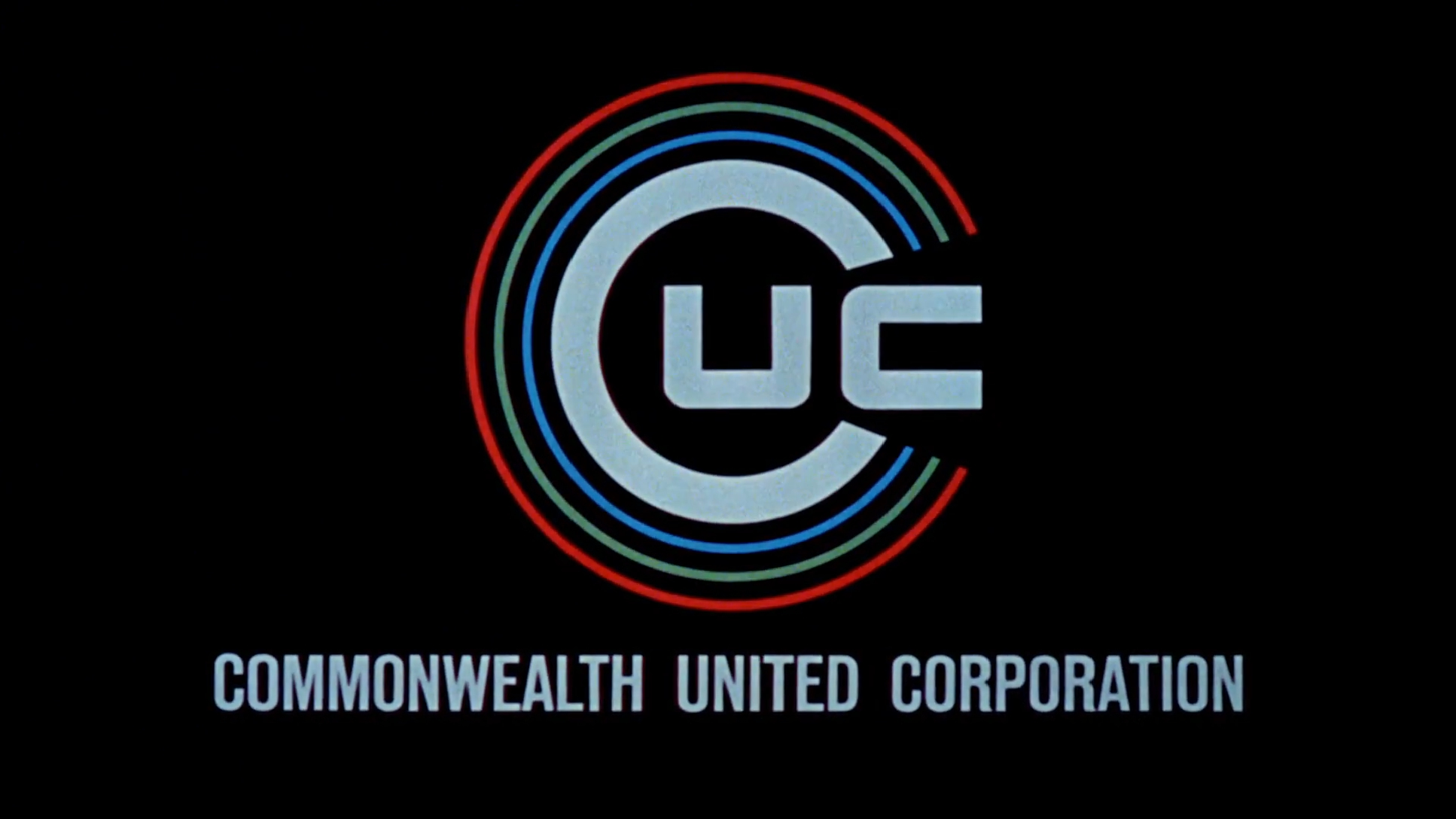
- The logo of Commonwealth United Corporation, c.1967–1970
- Industry: Entertainment
- Predecessor: Real Properties Corporation
- Founded: 1965
- Defunct: 1971; 55 years ago
- Fate: Dissolved
- Successor: National Telefilm Associates
- Divisions: Commonwealth United Entertainment; Commonwealth United Television; Commonwealth United Records; Commonwealth United Pictures

Commonwealth United Corporation (abbreviated as CUC) was originally a real estate holding company formed in 1961 as the Real Properties Corporation. It changed its name to CUC in 1965. In 1967, CUC acquired TEC. Milton T. Raynor moved to California and became vice-president at TEC. Later, Raynor took over ownership.

=== Commonwealth United Entertainment ===
In 1967, CUC acquired The Landau-Unger Company, with Ely Landau becoming president and CEO and Oliver A. Unger as executive vice-president. It also acquired TEC and was renamed Commonwealth United. In 1967, Commonwealth United produced 17 theatrical films and purchased publishing and recording interests. The Max Factor family financed That Cold Day in the Park, a movie directed by Robert Altman that Commonwealth United released in 1969. (Note: The Auteur Cinema. Page 89.) By 1971, Commonwealth United was $80 million in debt. The company's film rights, foreign and domestic, were acquired by National Telefilm Associates and American International Pictures respectively.

== Select credits ==
- A Black Veil for Lisa (1968)
- 99 Women (1969)
- Venus in Furs (1969)
- Battle of Neretva (1969)
- The Magic Christian (1969)
- It Takes All Kinds (1969)
- That Cold Day in the Park (1969)
- Paranoia (1969)
- Tiger by the Tail (1970)
- Julius Caesar (1970)
- Tam Lin (filmed in 1969, limited UK release in 1970)
- Freelance (filmed 1970)
