= The Bloody Judge (film) =

1970 film

- Directed by: Jesús Franco
- Screenplay by: Jesús Franco; Colombo Enrico; Anthony Scott Veitch; Michael Haller
- Produced by: Harry Alan Towers
- Starring: Christopher Lee; Maria Schell; Leo Genn; Maria Rohm; Margaret Lee; Hans Hass Jr.
- Cinematography: Manuel Merino
- Edited by: Gertrud Petermann; Maria Luisa Soriano; Derek Parsons
- Music by: Bruno Nicolai
- Production companies: Fénix Films; Terra-Filmkunst; Prodimex Films
- Release dates: 5 February 1970 (Italy); 5 June 1970 (West Germany); 20 April 1971 (Spain)
- Countries: Spain; Italy; West Germany

The Bloody Judge is a 1970 horror film directed by Jesús Franco and written by Enrico Colombo, Jesús Franco, Michael Haller, and Anthony Scott Veitch. The film stars Christopher Lee, Maria Schell, Leo Genn, Hans Hass Jr., Maria Rohm, and Margaret Lee. The film was released in Italy on February 5, 1970.

== Plot ==
This film is loosely based on the story of Judge Jeffries, the Lord Chief Justice of 17th-century England, who in this film condemned women as witches to further his political and sexual needs.

== Cast ==
- Christopher Lee as Judge Jeffries
- Maria Schell as Mother Rosa
- Leo Genn as Lord Wessex
- Hans Hass Jr. as Harry Selton
- Maria Rohm as Mary Gray
- Margaret Lee as Alicia Gray
- Peter Martell as Barnaby
- Howard Vernon as Jack Ketch
- Milo Quesada as Satchel

== Production ==
According to Harry Alan Towers' biographer Dave Mann, the collaborations between director Jesús Franco and Towers were fraught with difficulties. Franco explained that Towers liked doing co-productions with others and that the film was going to be an Anglo-American-German-Spanish-French-Italian co-production. This led to many changes to suit producers in each country's needs, with Franco recalling that the film was at first a horror film with a historical backdrop, then more of a historical film with a background of inquisition, then primarily about the inquisition, then an erotic film.

== Release ==
The Bloody Judge was released in Italy on 5 February 1970. It was later released in West Germany on 5 June 1970. The film was released in Spain on 20 April 1971 as Proceso de las Brujas. The film had 688,928 admissions in Spain. In 1972, the film was released in the U.S. as Night of the Blood Monster.

It was released on DVD in the UK by Salvation Films in 1999.
