= Jeremy Summers =

British film and TV director (1931–2016)

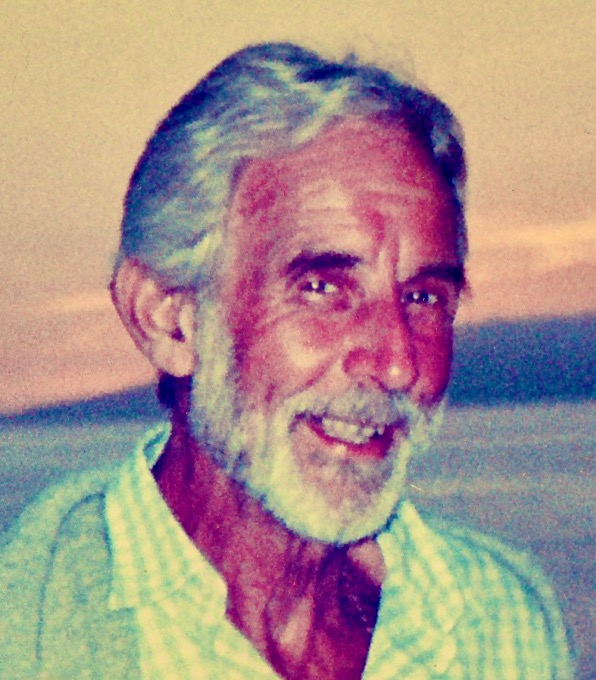
- Summers in 2007
- Born: 18 August 1931; St Albans, Hertfordshire, England, United Kingdom
- Died: 14 December 2016 (aged 85); Welwyn Garden City, Hertfordshire, England, United Kingdom
- Occupations: Film director, television director

Jeremy Summers (18 August 1931 – 14 December 2016) was a British television director and film director, known for directing television series such as The Saint and films such as Five Golden Dragons, The House of 1,000 Dolls, and The Vengeance of Fu Manchu.

== Background ==
Born in St Albans in 1931, Summers was born into a family of theatrical tradition and his father Walter Summers (1896-1973) was a film director and screenwriter.

He directed nearly 50 different TV programmes between 1960 and 1999, including The Saint and Randall and Hopkirk (Deceased).

== Career ==
In his early career, Summers worked as a runner and then later assistant director on films such as The Dam Busters (1955) with Michael Anderson and Moby Dick (1956) with John Huston.

Summers became a director with the support film Depth Charge (1960), the screenplay of which he also co-wrote, but he immediately turned his attention to television and directed episodes of Desert Hi-Jack, Interpol Calling and four episodes of International Detective between 1960 and 1961.

A sequence of feature films followed, the Tony Hancock feature film vehicle The Punch and Judy Man, Crooks in Cloisters (1964) with Ronald Fraser and Barbara Windsor, Dateline Diamonds (1965) starring William Lucas and Kenneth Cope as well as the Gerry and the Pacemakers feature film Ferry Cross the Mersey (1965). Meanwhile, he continued in television with Man of the World and, in 1965, episodes of Court Martial, Gideon's Way and the film San Ferry Ann.

In 1966, Summers directed one episode of Danger Man; he also directed some 12 episodes of The Saint from 1964 to 1966. Episodes of The Saint that Summers filmed include "The Lawless Lady", "The Death Penalty" and "The Unkind Philanthropist" (1964), "The Abducters" (1965) and "The Man Who Liked Lions" (1966).

This was followed in 1967 by The Baron and several foreign films of that year The Vengeance of Fu Manchu, Five Golden Dragons and The House of 1,000 Dolls for Harry Alan Towers. He also directed an episode of Man in a Suitcase in 1968.

In 1969, still under contract with ITC, Summers directed a number of episodes of the popular series Randall and Hopkirk (Deceased), working with actors Mike Pratt, Kenneth Cope and Annette Andre. In the 1970s, Summers directed two episodes of UFO and several of The Protectors, both being Gerry Anderson series. Other directing credits include Jason King (1971–72), Boy Dominic (1974), and Return of the Saint (1978, this version with Ian Ogilvy cast as Simon Templar). He also directed films for the Children's Film Foundation, including Sammy's Super T-shirt.

During the 1980s, he directed multiple episodes of dramas for the BBC and Independent Television, including Tenko (1982–84), Strangers and Brothers (1984), Big Deal (1985–86), All Creatures Great and Small (1988), Howard's Way (1989–90), and Hannay' (1988, with Robert Powell appearing as Richard Hannay).

In the 1990s he directed many episodes of the television soap operas Coronation Street, Emmerdale and Brookside (including the film spin offs The Lost Weekend, Friday the 13th and Double Take!) before his retirement in 2001. While on Brookside, he also directed the Liverpool FC feature The Last Night of the Kop commemorating the final time the football stand was used before Anfield became an all-seater stadium.
