= Alexandra Kamp =

German model and actress (born 1966)

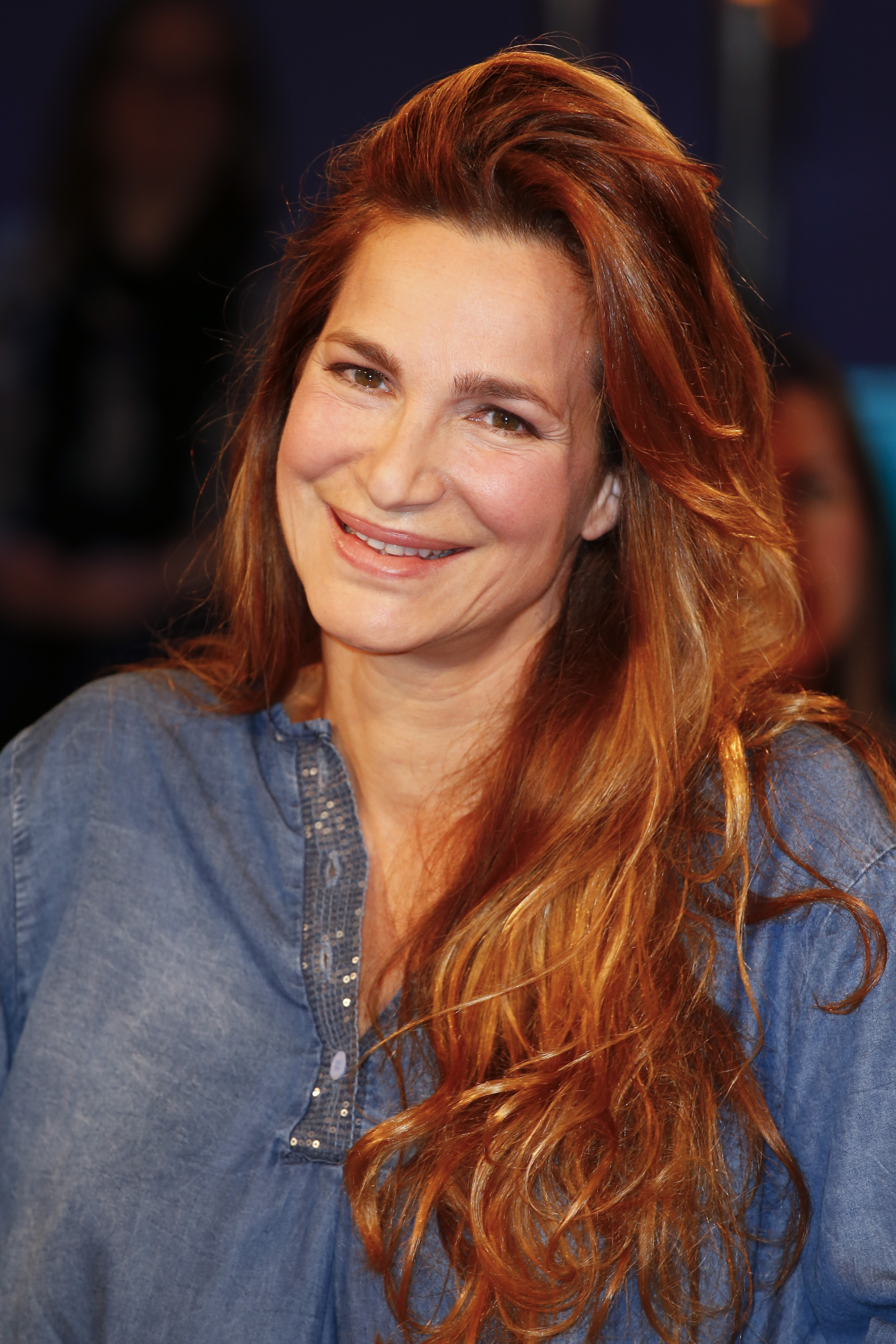
- Born: Alexandra Kamp; 29 December 1966 (age 59); Baden-Baden, Germany
- Parent: Peter Kamp

Alexandra Kamp-Groeneveld (born 29 December 1966) is a German model and actress.

== Biography ==
She was born in Karlsruhe to Peter Kamp and his wife and grew up in Baden-Baden. She visited drama schools in New York, Los Angeles and Paris before she started her career as an actress in 1994. She has had many star and supporting roles in German movies and TV series and some in Hollywood B-movies. In 1998, she acted together with Claudia Cardinale in Riches, belles, etc., in 2001 with Leslie Nielsen in 2001: A Space Travesty and in 2003 she played the star role in Sumuru together with Michael Shanks in an English-South African co-production. In 2007 she appeared as a covergirl on the German issue of the Playboy. Alexandra is the spokeswoman for the children's hospital "Kinderhospiz St. Nikolaus" in the Bavarian Alps, which gives a care home to terminally ill children and their parents. She frequently gives charity readings.

== Filmography ==
- Alle lieben Julia (1994, TV series, 26 episodes), as Liz
- Eine Frau wird gejagt (1995, TV series), as Fränzi Belling
- Küsse niemals deinen Chef (1997, TV series)
- Eine Lüge zuviel (1998, TV), as Britta Burkhard
- Riches, belles, etc. (1998)
- Fieber – Ärzte für das Leben (1998-2000, TV series, 23 episodes), as Dr. Sybille Alberich
- Ich liebe eine Hure (1998, TV film), as Lissy Seibold
- Der Kopp (1999, TV film), as Tanja Pollack
- Morgen gehört der Himmel dir (1999, TV film), as Anne
- Tatort: Licht und Schatten (1999, TV), as F. Timmermann
- Thrill – Spiel um dein Leben (2000, TV film) as Corinna Diering
- 2001: A Space Travesty (2001), as Dr. Uschi Künstler
- The Dreaming (2001, TV film), as Joanna Williams
- Shadow Fury (2001), as Dr. Louise Forster
- Antonia – Zwischen Liebe und Macht (2001, TV film), as Antonia Scherrer
- The Red Phone: Manhunt (2002, TV film), as Diana
- Sehnsucht nach Sandin (2002, TV film), as Anne Berentzen
- Half Past Dead (2002), as Reporter
- Deep Freeze (2002), as Dr. Monica Kelsey
- Ein himmliches Weihnachtsgeschenk (2002, TV film), as Sabine Pitzel
- Antonia – Tränen im Paradies (2003, TV film), as Countess Antonia von Ahrendorff
- Sumuru (2003), as Sumuru
- Mary Higgins Clark: A Crime of Passion (2003, TV film), as Arabella Young
- Ein Baby für dich (2004, TV film), as Ulrike Kunert
- Dracula 3000 (2004, TV film), as Mina Murry
- Wilde Engel: Wer schön sein will, muss sterben (2005, TV), as Heike Berger
- Karl May Festival in Bad Segeberg: Winnetou III (2006), as Dr. Kate Brody
- Um Himmels Willen: Traumfrau (2006, TV), as Monika Saint Claire
- Zoo Doctor: My Mom the Vet (2008, TV series, 5 episodes), as Dr. Lena Weingarten
