= The Million Eyes of Sumuru =

1967 British film by Lindsay Shonteff

- Theatrical release poster by Heywood Brown
- Directed by: Lindsay Shonteff
- Screenplay by: Kevin Kavanagh
- Story by: Peter Welbeck
- Based on: Sumuru by Sax Rohmer
- Produced by: Harry Alan Towers
- Starring: Frankie Avalon; George Nader; Shirley Eaton; Wilfrid Hyde-White; Klaus Kinski; Maria Rohm
- Cinematography: John Von Kotze
- Edited by: Allan Morrison
- Music by: Johnny Scott
- Production company: Sumuru Films
- Distributed by: Anglo-Amalgamated; Warner-Pathe
- Release dates: 17 May 1967 (US); 3 December 1967 (UK)
- Running time: 95 minutes
- Country: United Kingdom
- Language: English

The Million Eyes of Sumuru is a 1967 spy film directed by Lindsay Shonteff and starring Frankie Avalon, George Nader and Shirley Eaton. It was produced by Harry Alan Towers and filmed at the Shaw Brothers studios in Hong Kong. It was based on a series of novels by Sax Rohmer about a megalomaniacal femme fatale.

The film was released in the U.S. by American International Pictures on 17 May 1967. In the UK, it was released through Warner-Pathé on 3 December, titled simply Sumuru.

== Plot ==
Sumuru is a beautiful and evil woman who plans world domination by having her sexy all-female army eliminate male leaders and replace them with her female agents.

The Chief of Security for President Boong of Sinonesia is killed. Two Americans in Hong Kong, Nick West and his friend Tommy Carter, are persuaded by the head of British intelligence, Colonel Baisbrook, to investigate. They discover the organisation headed by Sumuru, which claims to be interested in peaceful activities.

Nick is implicated in the murder of a girl after she winds up dead in his bed. Later, Nick and Tommy go to Hong Kong to stop an assassination.

== Cast ==
- Frankie Avalon as Agent Tommy Carter
- George Nader as Agent Nick West
- Shirley Eaton as Sumuru
- Wilfrid Hyde-White as Colonel Sir Anthony Baisbrook
- Klaus Kinski as President Boong
- Maria Rohm as Helga Martin
- Patti Chandler as Louise
- Salli Sachse as Mikki
- Ursula Rank as Erno
- Krista Nell as Zoe
- Paul Chang Chungas as Inspector Koo
- Essie Lin Chia as Kitty (credited as Essie Huang)
- Jon Fong as Colonel Medika
- Denise Davreux as Sumuru guard
- Mary Cheng as Sumuru guard
- Jill Hamilton as Sumuru guard
- Lisa Gray as Sumuru guard
- Christine Lok as Sumuru guard
- Margaret Cheung as Sumuru guard
- Louise Lee as Sumuru guard

== Production ==
Shirley Eaton had made Ten Little Indians for Harry Alan Towers.

== Reception ==
Variety wrote "Nader delivers some unfunny comic lines in a way that they are not completely lost and Avalon poses, moves and talks like a nightclub entertainer."

Filmink wrote the film "is never as much fun as you hope it’d be: George Nader seems to be sending up heterosexuality throughout the movie, but it must be admitted that he fits into the “world” of the movie more than Frankie Avalon, whose presence feels weird. Still, the movie is worth checking out for the locations and Eaton, who is having a grand old time."

== Legacy ==
Shirley Eaton reprised her role as Sumuru in Jess Franco's follow-up The Girl from Rio (1969). Eaton later said "I did enjoy being the wicked lady Sumuru in two rather bad films, which I had not had the chance to be before." However, she retired from acting shortly afterwards.

The Million Eyes of Sumuru inspired riot grrrl musician Lois Maffeo to adopt Bikini Kill as a band name. She and her friend Margaret Doherty used the name for a one-off performance where they donned faux fur punk cave girl costumes. Tobi Vail liked the name and appropriated it for the iconic punk group after Maffeo settled on the band name Cradle Robbers.

The film is featured in episode #18 of the KTMA season of Mystery Science Theater 3000 as well as in episode #09 of season 13. It is also featured as a video on demand from its spiritual successor RiffTrax.
