= Blue Underground =

American DVD label

- Industry: Home video
- Products: DVD, Blu-ray
- Website: blue-underground.com

Blue Underground is an American company specializing in releasing remastered editions of cult, horror, and exploitation movies on DVD and Blu-ray. It was founded in 2002 by filmmaker William Lustig.

It was originally formed as a shell company to oversee 'making of' documentaries during founder William Lustig's time at Anchor Bay Entertainment, but became an independent entity in late 2002. The company has released a broad range of cult movies to disc, but leans toward European (particularly Italian), Asian and Brazilian horror and exploitation.

Blue Underground goes to great lengths to feature restored transfers from original vault elements (a process that occasionally leads to substantial delays with their releases, given the age and obscurity of some of the titles they select), and to include extensive extras (such as commentary tracks and new documentaries) whenever possible. Each title is released unedited and with a choice between the original audio track and usually a lossless 7.1 remix.

As of October 2009, Blue Underground had issued more than 160 DVDs, and in 2008 they started to release films in High Definition on the Blu-ray Disc format. In 2020 they began releasing films in Ultra HD Blu-ray.
