= Ethnic stereotypes in comics =

Ethnic stereotypes in comics (the representation of racial and ethnic minorities in mainstream comic books) have evolved over time, reflecting the changing political climate.

== Sociopolitical impact of comics ==
Throughout history, comics have reflected the sociopolitical attitudes of their writers and readers. In America, early comics consisted primarily of short, humorous comic strips printed in newspapers. In the 1930s, comics evolved into longer, action-oriented storylines and transitioned into the comic medium format. It began addressing important contemporary political issues. For example, some have suggested that the Wonder Woman character and title evolved as a vehicle to communicate pro-American attitudes during World War II. X-Men creator, Stan Lee frequently cited the Civil Rights Movement as the inspiration for his mutant team of superheroes, and has translated many of the tensions of majority-minority race politics into the X-Men title.

Nonetheless, for many years, comic book characters noticeably lacked racial and ethnic diversity. Diversity in comics first started during the 1940s but persisted during the decades. Comics writer and artist Kev F. Sutherland said "...when you look at the shelves and see half the titles on sale are characters like Superman, Batman, Spider-Man—dammit, these characters weren't even allowed to be Jewish like their creators, let alone be black". Recognizing the influence of comics on popular culture, some members of ethnic and racial communities have focused their attention on stereotypes within comics, and have begun lobbying to change them. This is accomplished in many ways, frequently by either writing new character of color or "trans-racializing" existing characters to become racial or ethnic minorities (e.g. the changing of Karate Kid's race from White to Asian).

Given the recent popularity of injecting characters of color into popular comic titles, a new concern has arisen regarding possible tokenism, and many writers advocate not just the inclusion of characters of color into predominantly White casts of characters, but that these minority characters defy the racial and ethnic stereotypes so prevalent in the history of comics, as well as maintaining the high standard of comic book writing. Daley Osiyemi, creator of Brodie's Law and co-founder of Pulp Theatre Entertainment said, "...we don't just want black characters or superheroes in comics as mere tokens, they have to be strong characters in their own right and have strong stories built around them".

In 2007 the scholarly journal MELUS (publication of The Society for the Study of the Multi-Ethnic Literature of the United States) devoted an entire issue to the literary and sociological representations of race and ethnicity in comics. The issue was guest edited by Derek Parker Royal, and it included essays on older graphic narratives (such as Jackie Ormes's Torchy Brown and Miné Okubo's Citizen 13660), more recent graphic novels (Ho Che Anderson's King, Ben Katchor's The Jew of New York, and Mark Kalesniko's Mail Order Bride), as well as various comic book series (Dwayne McDuffie's Deathlok, Adrian Tomine's Optic Nerve, and Los Bros Hernandez's Love and Rockets). Gilbert Hernandez illustrated the cover, and the issue included an interview with him as well.

== Arabs ==
On the other hand, Jack Shaheen, professor emeritus of mass communications at Southern Illinois University has written extensively on the plight of Arabs in the American mass media. He wrote that due to ignorance, fear, and political beliefs, Arabs are rarely portrayed as anything but villains. Those few positive portrayals are often passive, neither taking the limelight away from the most often Caucasian protagonists, nor overshadowing the active role of the evil Arabs in the book. Examples include Marvel's Fasaud, Apocalypse, Shadow King, Living Monolith, Asp, the Desert Swords, Abdul Alhazred, Saracen, and Arabian Knight, and DC's Ra's al Ghul and Talia al Ghul.

=== The terrorist ===
As far back as 1953, in an issue of John Wayne Adventure Comics, John Wayne captures an Arab who is attempting to drive American oil companies out by launching a terrorist campaign.

== Black ==
An early black character to be incorporated into a syndicated comic strip was Lothar, who appeared in Mandrake the Magician in the 1930s. He was Mandrake's sidekick: the circus strongman, who wore a Tarzan-style costume and was poor, and uneducated. Since the introduction of Lothar, black characters have received a variety of treatments in comics, and not all of them positive.

=== Physical caricatures ===
Early graphic art of all kinds often depicted Black characters in a stylized fashion, emphasizing certain physical features to form a recognizable racial caricature of Black faces. These features often included long unkempt hair, broad noses, large red-tinted lips, dark skin and ragged clothing reminiscent of those worn by Black slaves. These characters were also depicted as speaking accented English. In the early 20th century United States, these kinds of representations were seen frequently in newspaper comic strips and political cartoons, as well as in later comic magazines, and were also present in early cartoons by Disney and Looney Tunes. In comics, nameless Black bystanders and even some notable heroes and villains were developed in this style, including The Spirit's sidekick Ebony White and Billy Batson's valet Steamboat.

==== Ebony White ====
Writer-artist Will Eisner is sometimes criticized for his depiction of Ebony White, the young African American sidekick of Eisner's 1940s and 1950s character The Spirit. Eisner later admitted to consciously stereotyping the character, but said he tried to do so with "responsibility", and argued that "at the time humor consisted in our society of bad English and physical difference in identity". The character developed beyond the stereotype as the series progressed, and Eisner also introduced black characters (such as the plain-speaking Detective Grey) who defied popular stereotypes.

In a 1966 New York Herald Tribune feature by his former office manager-turned-journalist, Marilyn Mercer wrote: "Ebony never drew criticism from Negro groups (in fact, Eisner was commended by some for using him), perhaps because, although his speech pattern was early Minstrel Show, he himself derived from another literary tradition: he was a combination of Tom Sawyer and Penrod, with a touch of Horatio Alger hero, and color didn't really come into it".

=== "Savages" ===
Critics of the portrayal of early Black characters note the frequency with which Black characters were shown as "savages", frequently shown with bones in their ears, noses, and hair, or depicted as cannibals.

==== Tintin in the Congo ====
The artist Hergé received much criticism for his first comics. Tintin in the Congo, first serialized beginning in 1930, presented the typical colonial view Belgians had about the people in Belgian Congo, including the missionary bringing civilization to the uneducated blacks. According to one reviewer, "the Africans are portrayed as primitive, simple-minded folk". Hergé, 23 years old when he began the album, defended himself as being naïve instead of intentionally racist. Nevertheless, the album was not translated into English until 1991—more than 50 years after its initial release—due to those concerns.

=== Animals ===
The historian Ian Gordon, author of Comic Strips and Consumer Culture, 1890–1945, argues that the need for comic strips to appeal to diverse national audiences in the US meant that the outright racial caricatures of minstrelsy did not translate to the comic strips with any commercial success. Instead artists and writers developed "de-raciate" Black stereotypes in the form of funny animal characters the first of which Felix the Cat owed his existence directly to the racialized humor of a strip named "Sambo and His Funny Noises". Other examples of such characters include Krazy Kat, created by George Herriman who was biracial, and Mickey Mouse.

=== Blaxploitation era ===
In the late 1960s and throughout the 1970s, several African-American heroes were created in the vein of blaxploitation-era movie protagonists, and seemed to be a direct response to the notable Black Nationalist movement. These (predominantly male) heroes were often martial artists, came from the ghetto, and were politically motivated. They were frequently pitted against White villains, representing the Black struggle against 'The Man': a catch-all phrase popularized during the Civil Rights Movement to represent the White power structure. However, as much as the blaxploitation era superheroes contrasted earlier racial caricatures of Blacks in comics, one attribute remained common—hypersexuality; many Blaxploitation heroes were still highly masculinized, reminiscent of the Mandingo stereotype, and were frequently seen sexually dominating White female characters. Examples of such blaxploitation characters include Luke Cage, Misty Knight, Bronze Tiger and Black Lightning.

=== Black proteges ===
In the 1970s, several African American heroes were created and paired with established white heroes as sidekicks and black proteges. Black Goliath, for example, became a black and slightly inferior (in terms of scientific ability and combat experience) version of his white mentor.

== East Asian ==
=== Yellow Peril ===
Many Asian characters were pitted against White American protagonists in early American comics, capturing America's real-world frustrations and political distrust of foreign Asian powers. Symbolizing America's "phobia of the "Yellow Peril", these characters were frequently of foreign nationality (usually Chinese) and often possessed a stereotypically Asian appearance (for example, a long wispy moustache and yellow-tinted skin). They were often highly intelligent or in possession of a powerful, supernatural ability and generally occupied themselves with elaborate plans for world domination, although they were usually thwarted by the American heroes of their time. While usually serious threats, one somewhat humorous Yellow Peril villain was DC's Egg Fu, a giant Communist egg with facial features and a prehensile moustache.

==== Fu Manchu ====
In the early 20th century, author Sax Rohmer published a series of novels focusing on the wildly popular Chinese villain, Dr. Fu Manchu. Attempting to capitalize on this success, DC Comics and Marvel Comics both published comic books featuring Chinese villains physically resembling Fu Manchu and possessing the same personality, sexual ambiguity, and ambitions for world domination. Because neither publisher possessed a license for the Fu Manchu character, these early Chinese comic book villains were either unnamed or had a different name than Fu Manchu. Examples include DC's Red Dragon and Marvel's Yellow Claw and The Mandarin.

In 1938, DC Comics obtained the license for Sax Rohmer's character, and subsequent titles featured Fu Manchu as a recurring villain. Marvel Comics obtained the rights for Fu Manchu in 1972, and he was notably introduced as the father of Marvel's Shang-Chi, protagonist of the Master of Kung Fu title.

Although both DC and Marvel have since declined to renew their license for the Fu Manchu character, Fu Manchu has made brief appearances in modern comics, As the result of Marvel Comics later losing the rights to the Fu Manchu name, his later appearances give him the real name of Zheng Zu, usually referred to merely as 'The Doctor' (as in Alan Moore's League of Extraordinary Gentlemen).

=== Coolie ===
Several early characters of Asian descent were introduced as the clumsy, foolish and bumbling sidekicks of White male superheroes. These characters were frequently caricatures of the Chinese coolie, appearing short in stature, sporting bucked teeth and a queue, and spoke pidgin English. These characters often served as comedy relief or as a convenient hostage for the villain of the day. Examples of such characters include the controversial Chop-Chop (aka Wu Cheng) of DC's Blackhawk team and Wing, sidekick of the Crimson Avenger.

==== Chop-Chop ====
Chop-Chop was the youngest member of the Blackhawk team created by Will Eisner, Chuck Cuidera, and Bob Powell for Quality Comics during World War II. Resembling other Chinese caricatures typical of the era, Chop-Chop was short with bright yellow skin, bucked teeth, and a queue. His primary role seemed to be as the chef of the Blackhawk team. Strangely, Chop-Chop was also the only member of the Blackhawks who did not wear a Blackhawk uniform; instead, he wore traditional Chinese shirt and pants.

Many members of the Asian American community found the character of Chop-Chop to be highly controversial and offensive. Addressing the disparity of Asian American characters in the comic industry and the stereotypical images of early characters, noted Asian American comics writer Larry Hama said: "Many companies were still coloring Asians bright yellow... In the '40s and '50s, the character Chop Chop in the 'Blackhawks' had big buck teeth, a long pigtail and lots of cleavers. It wasn't until sometime in the '60s that he evolved into a short slim guy who was a jaundiced shade of orange". The event to which Hama refers occurred in Blackhawk #197 (June 1964). That issue began the "New Blackhawks", an attempt to modernize the team that included new uniforms. Chop-Chop got a uniform and his own aircraft (he had nearly always ridden with Blackhawk or one of the other team members prior to this time). Chop-Chop was treated and portrayed as a full member of the team from this point on but certain stereotypical factors were still in play. Like most Asian comic book heroes, he was now a martial arts expert. This was emphasized even more when the Blackhawks tried being super-powered heroes in issues #228 (January 1967) to #241 (Jun–Jul 1968). In that run of stories, Chop-Chop was known as "Dr. Hands".

In the next revival of the Blackhawks (with issue #244, Jan–Feb 1976), Chop-Chop got a new name, Chopper, and was treated pretty much like all the other members of the team. He was no longer an ethnic caricature and the decades of his portrayal as one were simply ignored as if they had never happened. It took a third revival of the title in 1982 (Blackhawk #251) to finally address that issue. Writer Mark Evanier and artist Dan Spiegle avoided all the racial and ethnic stereotypes that had previously defined Chop-Chop's character except one. They put him back in the coolie outfit that the character had worn for a large part of his existence. This was a deliberate move so they could examine why Chop-Chop was not treated like a full member of the team in a story titled "What's the Matter with Chop-Chop?" (#265, December 1983). The story has the other Blackhawks examine their attitudes and feelings and, at the end, Wu Cheng gets respect and a uniform.

Howard Chaykin's 1987 Blackhawk limited series explains the earlier stereotypical representations as an in-universe comic book, which Chop-Chop expresses indignation towards.

=== Martial arts master ===
Nearly all Asian characters in mainstream American comics are capable of martial arts, and for several Asian characters, this is their only skill or ability. An overwhelming number of Asian characters, particularly those of Japanese descent, are portrayed as masters of ninjutsu or the ways of the samurai, and are frequently introduced as teachers of non-Asian protagonists. Examples include Marvel's Shang-Chi, Colleen Wing, Psylocke (both as Betsy Braddock while body-swapped with Kwannon, and as Kwannon herself), Silver Samurai, DC's Katana, Lady Shiva, and Cassandra Cain. Frequently, martial arts masters are associated with Asian religions, such as Buddhism, and a common archetype is that of the elderly, wise monk.

=== Dragon Lady ===
Female Asian characters in comics are frequently depicted as hypersexualized, cold-blooded and untrustworthy, in a racial caricature frequently referred to as the dragon lady. This stereotype references the popular villainess of the same name who first appeared in the vintage comic strip, Terry and the Pirates, and was later popularized in film by roles such as that of Anna May Wong's title character in the film, Daughter of the Dragon, where she played Princess Ling Moy, daughter of Fu Manchu, inspired by Fah Lo Suee, daughter of the villain in the literary series Fu Manchu by Sax Rohmer. Wong became famous for playing other characters classified as Dragon Lady.

==== Fah Lo Suee ====
Fah Lo Suee was a character in Sax Rohmer's series of pulp novels featuring Dr. Fu Manchu. Fah Lo Suee's name meant "Sweet Perfume", and she was Fu Manchu's daughter. In Marvel Comics, Fah Lo Suee was Shang-Chi's sister, and a hypersexualized temptress with the power of hypnosis. Her loyalties lay only with her own ambitions, and she was willing to turn on anyone, including her own father, if it would benefit her. She eventually joined MI6 and became a high-ranking official, although she did this only in further pursuit of power for herself. After Marvel Comics losing the rights to Fu Manchu, Fah Lo Suee was renamed Zheng Bao Yu and her father renamed Zheng Zu.

== Latina/o ==
The Latina/o community makes up about 13.9% of the comic book demographic in the US. This makes Latinos the second largest demographic, and the largest minority group among comic book buyers, according to United States Census Bureau data from 2010-2021. While it is very difficult to pin down an exact number of superheroes that identify as Latino/a in comics, there is little representation when compared to the total amount of Marvel/DC superheroes and villains; Marvel studios alone is estimated to have about 7000+ characters. Latina/o characters are generally under-represented in media: a 2021 study showed Latinas/os accounted for about 5% of leading roles in 1,300 films spanning between 2007-2019. When Latinas/os are portrayed as stereotypes, those stereotypes are reinforced and grossly generalized.

=== The Spicy Latina Trope ===
The stereotype "Spicy Latina" has long been a trope for Latinas and Latin American women characters portrayed in media, from the 1940s example of Brazilian singer and dancer Carmen Miranda, to more recent examples such as the character of Gloria Delgado-Pritchett in the television show Modern Family, portrayed by Sofia Vergara. This characterization includes physical and personality attributes such as a curvy body, being passionate, having a hot temper, seeming "exotic," all culminating in a fantasy meant to entice.

The character Anita Santiago of Lady Rawhide first appeared in Topps comics Zorro issue #3 (1993-1994), as a feminized and modern take on the Old West gunslinger Rawhide Kid. With her scantily-clad design and personality serving as a counterpoint to Zorro, she was sexualized and offered fan service. Santiago's sword fighting ability is excellent, but among her best super powers is her "Attractive Female" ability, which she uses through her many revealing outfits to disarm and distract her enemies.

==== The White Tiger ====
Angela Del Toro, the niece of Hector Ayala/White Tiger, Marvel's first Latino superhero, took up the mantle and amulet after Ayala died. In the comics, she is portrayed as being Latina, but with vague Puerto Rican roots. On her solo comic book cover debut, Del Toro poses in provocative manner in a skin-tight suit that accentuates her body, pouty lips, and long dark hair. In another cover she grasps her amulet in a way that highlights her chest, while her head tilt and face gestures as if to inspire arousal.

=== Whitewashing of Sunspot ===
Sunspot (Roberto da Costa), an Afro-Brazilian character, has appeared with lighter skin tones over time, which may be a form of whitewashing. Many artists have drawn him, which may account for this inconsistency. The whitewashing of Sunspot contradicts his violent origin story: his mutant abilities first activated when he became a victim of a racial hate crime. The character Keller, who is Caucasian, assaulted and brutally attacked Costa while playing soccer because of the color of his skin. Keller threw insults at Costa, calling him a half-breed and stating that even though he comes from a family of wealth, that will never change the color of his skin.

=== Vibe ===
Puerto Rican DC superhero Vibe (Paco Ramone) was originally portrayed as being brazen, and overly flamboyant. George Pérez, who was of Puerto Rican descent, is said to have hated drawing the character. Pérez was one of the very few Latinos working for DC studios at the time, and he disagreed with how the superhero was portrayed. He felt that the character had very little depth and was created solely as a gimmick, such as the character's breakdancing to appeal to young people.

== See also ==
- List of black superheroes
- List of Latino superheroes
- List of Asian superheroes
- List of Native American superheroes
