= Five Weapons Society =

Marvel Comics fictional group

Publication information
- Publisher: Marvel Comics
- First appearance: As Celestial Order of the Si-Fan: Special Marvel Edition #15 (December 1973); As Order of the Golden Dawn: Master of Kung Fu #83 (September 1979); As Celestial Order of the Hai-Dai: Secret Avengers #6 (October 2010); As Five Weapons Society: Shang-Chi #1 (September 2020)
- Created by: Sax Rohmer; Steve Englehart; Jim Starlin; Doug Moench; Mike Zeck; Ed Brubaker; Mike Deodato; Gene Luen Yang; Dike Ruan; Philip Tan

In-story information
- Type of organization: Secret society Formerly: Criminal organization
- Base(s): Currently: House of the Deadly Hand, Chinatown, Manhattan (Headquarters); House of the Deadly Staff, London; House of the Deadly Dagger, Paris; House of the Deadly Hammer, Chara Sands; House of the Deadly Sabre, Tokyo; Formerly: House of the Deadly Hand, Henan
- Leader(s): Shang-Chi; Formerly: Zheng Zu; Zheng Yi; Kingpin; Zheng Bao Yu
- Agent(s): Currently: Sister Dagger; Brother Sabre; Sister Hammer; Brother Staff; Sister Staff; Master Ling; Formerly: Midnight Sun; Death Dealer; Moving Shadow

The Five Weapons Society is a fictional organization appearing in American comic books published by Marvel Comics. The Five Weapons Society was an organization created by the brothers Zheng Yi and Zheng Zu to defend China during the Qing dynasty. After Yi's death, the society became a criminal organization, using names such as the Celestial Order of the Si-Fan and the Celestial Order of the Hai-Dai.

The organization debuted in Special Marvel Edition #15 (December 1973), in the Bronze Age of Comic Books, as the “Celestial Order of Si-Fan”, the name of the organization created by Sax Rohmer in his Fu Manchu novels. After Marvel lost the publication rights to the Rohmer characters, Fu Manchu, the father of Shang-Chi, was retconned into Zheng Zu.

== Publication history ==
In the early 1970s, writer Steve Englehart and artist Jim Starlin approached Marvel Comics to adapt the television series Kung Fu into a comic book, as DC's parent company, Warner Communications, owned the rights to the series. The duo then approached Marvel Comics with the idea to create a kung fu-focused original comic. Editor-in-chief Roy Thomas agreed, but only if they would include the Sax Rohmer's pulp villain Dr. Fu Manchu, as Marvel had previously acquired the comic book rights to the character. Englehart and Starlin developed Shang-Chi, a master of kung fu and a previously unknown son of Dr. Fu Manchu. Though an original character himself, many of Shang-Chi's supporting characters (most notably Fu Manchu, Denis Nayland Smith, Dr. James Petrie, Fah Lo Suee and the Si-Fan) were Rohmer creations. The Si-Fan first appeared in Special Marvel Edition #15 (December 1973), which was later retitled Master of Kung Fu two issues later.

In the Rohmer novels, the Si-Fan were a tong turned international criminal organization that Fu Manchu led as part of his plans for world domination. In the comics, the Si-Fan retained the same role as the novels and were often portrayed as a ninja-like clan similar to the Hand.

After Marvel's license with the Rohmer estate expired, Master of Kung Fu was cancelled in 1983. Despite subsequent issues either mentioning characters from the novels cryptically or phased out entirely, the Si-Fan still kept its original name in its appearances.

In 2010's Secret Avengers #6–10, writer Ed Brubaker sidestepped the entire issue via a storyline where the Shadow Council resurrects a zombified version of Fu Manchu, only to discover that Manchu was only an alias and that Shang-Chi's father real name is Zheng Zu (Chinese: 鄭祖) while the Si-Fan is referred to as the Hai-Dai.

In the 2020 Shang-Chi miniseries, writer Gene Luen Yang made a complete overhaul of the Shang-Chi mythos by introducing the Five Weapons Society, the true name of his father's organization that, was once a heroic secret society that became a criminal organization and that the Si-Fan and Hai-Dai were aliases the Society went through during its history. Dismayed by the orientalist depictions of the organization in older comics, Yang worked to bring an authentic portrayal of Chinese culture with the Five Weapons Society, depicting them as a cult "frozen in [the] time" of the Qing dynasty and cut off from modern China. Yang based the Five Houses of the Society off the five elements of Eastern culture, with: Fire (Deadly Hand), Water (Deadly Dagger), Wood (Deadly Staff), Metal (Deadly Sabre) and Earth (Deadly Hammer). Shang-Chi being the Champion of the House of the Deadly Hand is a reference to The Hands of Shang-Chi, Master of Kung Fu, and The Deadly Hands of Kung Fu series he previously starred in. In a departure of previous stories of Shang-Chi rejecting his father's legacy, Yang ended the miniseries with Shang-Chi taking over his father's organization, vowing to return it to its heroic roots.

== Fictional organization history ==
=== Origins ===
The Five Weapons Society was created during the Qing dynasty to protect China by the Sorcerer Brothers Zheng Zu and Zheng Yi and their five disciples, the Deadly Warriors. Zu based the Deadly Warrior's names and the Society's structure off the Five Sets of Heavenly Weapons of Ta-Lo: One Hammer (Hammer), Two Swords (Sabre), Nine Daggers (Dagger), Three Staffs (Staff) and Ten Rings (Hand).

On one such mission, the Sorcerer Brothers and the Deadly Warriors protected the Tianjin Prefecture from Fin Fang Foom. The Ancient One, a fellow sorcerer and friend, provided the brothers the Eyes of the Dragon, a pair of stones that granted longevity and vigor while requiring the sacrifice of another. By 1860, the brothers had aged decades beyond their natural lifespans through the use of longevity spells and outlived the original Deadly Warriors, but had grown weaker as a result. During the Second Opium War, the Society fought against British forces, but were defeated by Dormammu and the Mindless Ones summoned by the British sorcerer Baron Harkness, resulting in the deaths of the era's Deadly Warriors. Zu attempted to use the Eyes of the Dragon to save the fatally wounded Yi at the cost of his own life, but not wanting to rule the Society alone, Yi reversed the spell, granting Zu immortality and restoring his youth, giving him the power to defeat the combined British forces. Following the death of his brother and the Deadly Warriors, Zu led the Society alone, establishing five houses in their honor. Without his brother's guidance, Zu became increasingly bitter and ruthless. After losing one of the houses during the Boxer Rebellion, Zu renounced his country and followers for their perceived weakness and lied about his brother's death, claiming he killed him for being weak as well and stole his spirit energy to augment his own. Zu subsequently relocated four of the Society's five houses to foreign countries within the Eight-Nation Alliance to monitor those who had fought against China and the Society during the conflict. Only the House of the Deadly Hand would remain in China, which would also serve as his personal retreat and base of operations.

In the following years, each of the five Houses became supplemented with scores of Warriors, with the best ones being named the Champion of their house. Several of Zu's children would be raised in each of the Houses, with five of them each emerging as Champion. Zu turned the Society into a criminal empire, adopting the moniker Fu Manchu and renaming the Society as the Celestial Order of the Si-Fan. Despite the changing times, the Society retained the image it had during the Qing dynasty, with all of its members still wearing clothing of the era well into the 21st century. Members who were raised within the confines of the Society had little to no exposure to modern culture, including Zu's children. By the time of the present day, the Si-Fan had made connections with organizations like Triads in Asia and Tongs in America.

=== Celestial Order of the Si-Fan ===
Fu Manchu's son Shang-Chi was raised from infancy to be the Society's ultimate warrior. During his upbringing, Shang-Chi was unaware of the Si-Fan's true name or goals, nor the fact that he was the designated Champion of the House of the Deadly Hand. After discovering his father's evil nature, Shang-Chi defects from the Si-Fan, sparking a years long conflict with his father's criminal empire. Shang-Chi's half-sister Fah Lo Suee gains control over her own faction of the Si-Fan from their father but fails to co-opt Shang-Chi into her own schemes to usurp their father's criminal empire. At one point, Fu Manchu unites the Si-Fan with various groups like the Dacoits, Thugees, Knights Templar, and Hashashins into a single organization named the Order of the Golden Dawn. The Golden Dawn's attempt to start World War III is thwarted by Shang-Chi and his allies. He became a tong leader using the name Wang Yu-Seng.

After Fu Manchu's apparent death, their organization was divided into factions: Sleeping Dragon Clan (led by Chiang Kai-Dong), Steel Lotus Group (led by Hsien Ming-Ho), Wild Tiger Mob (led by Deng Ling-Xiao) and Coiled Serpent Syndicate (led by Mao Liu-Cho). The Kingpin takes control of his own faction of the Si-Fan in Hong Kong and provides them cybernetics. Shang-Chi joins forces with the X-Men and Elektra against the Kingpin's Si-Fan. Under the name Cursed Lotus, his daughter Fah Lo Suee teamed up with Deng Ling-Xiao and the Wild Tiger Mob and marketed a new drug called Wild Tiger, Despite the Wild Tiger mob being brought down by Shang-Chi, she eludes capture. Shang-Chi never discovers his half-sister's involvement.

Fu Manchu eventually resurfaces and employed Zaran (Zhou Man She) to retrieve a chemical from A.I.M. and later directed him to kill Shang-Chi for him. He sent his dacoits to aid Zaran against Shang-Chi and the Marvel Knights. Although they succeeded in destroying the building that Shang-Chi was in, Zaran failed to slay him. Later retakes control of the Si-Fan but his plot to deploy his Hellfire Weapon is thwarted once again by his son and his allies, at that time it was known as Comte de Saint Germain or Ghost.

=== Celestial Order of the Hai-Dai ===
Sometime after Fu Manchu's next death, Steve Rogers tracks down Shang-Chi after the Shadow Council resurrects Shang-Chi's father and employs the Si-Fan, now called the Celestial Order of the Hai-Dai, to capture Shang-Chi. Shang-Chi discovers with the Secret Avengers his father's real identity as Zheng Zu. Shang-Chi is eventually captured by the Hai-Dai and taken to the Shadow Council and Zu, who plans to sacrifice Shang-Chi with the Eyes of the Dragon to complete his resurrection. The Shadow Council and Zu are thwarted when the Prince of Orphans disrupts the ritual and kills Zu, resulting in his permanent death.

The reveal of Zu's true identity results Fah Lo Suee's real identity, Zheng Bao Yu being revealed as well. Now in full control of the Hai-Dai, Bao Yu resumes her father's long-forgotten experiment of bio-engineering Brood eggs as weapons, which she uses to carry out hits in New York's Chinatown. The plot is uncovered by Misty Knight and Annabelle Riggs of the Fearless Defenders with help from Elsa Bloodstone; the three track Bao Yu and the Hai-Dai assassins and scientists to an underground laboratory. With the help of No-Name of the Brood, the Fearless Defenders defeat the Hai-Dai and destroy the experiments, forcing Bao Yu to teleport away from her lair.

=== Supreme Commander Shang-Chi ===
After Zu's death at the hands of the Prince of Orphans, leadership of the Five Weapons Society passes onto one of his sons, Brother Staff, who shifts the Society's goals to monetary gain, including drug dealing. Dissatisfied with this direction, Zu's daughter Sister Hammer usurps control of the Society from Staff. Despite Zheng Zu's spirit naming Shang-Chi as his successor, Hammer names herself Supreme Commander of the Society. While the Warriors of the Deadly Staff and Hammer pledge their loyalty to her, the remaining House Champions Brother Sabre and Sister Dagger seek out Shang-Chi for him to reclaim his rightful place as the legitimate ruler. The two tell him of the Society's true name and history and his role as the Champion To bolster her forces, Hammer revives her father's experiments with jiangshi, eventually raising an undead army to attack London. With the combined efforts of Shang-Chi, the loyal Society members and Leiko Wu, the jiangshi army was destroyed and Hammer flees from the Society. Shang-Chi is subsequently named Supreme Commander and vows to return the Society to its nobler roots.

As the new Supreme Commander, Shang-Chi works diligently to undo Zheng Zu's evil influence over the Society, including shutting down a rogue drug ring still loyal to his father in New York City. When a Cosmic Cube is up for bid in Macau, Shang-Chi and Brother Sabre attend the auction as representatives of the Society to prevent the Cube from being purchased by the other attending criminal organizations. Due to the disappearance of the original House of the Deadly Hand following Zheng Zu's death, Shang-Chi has a new House of the Deadly Hand built in New York City's Chinatown, which also serves as the main headquarters for the Society. Shang-Chi is also able to convince his exiled mutant half-sister Zheng Zhilan into rejoining the Society as its new Sister Staff. Despite Shang-Chi's efforts to reform the Society, several of his superhero allies became wary of his involvement with his father's criminal empire. After the Cosmic Cube Shang-Chi acquired from Macau and gave to Captain America was revealed to be a fake, the Avengers become convinced that Shang-Chi has embraced his father's evil ways. The Avengers, Spider-Man and Mister Fantastic confront Shang-Chi, leading to a battle with the Society. When it was revealed that Brother Sabre had stolen the Cube without Shang-Chi's knowledge, Shang-Chi hands him to the Avengers and returns the Cube.

Unbeknownst to Shang-Chi, several enemies Shang-Chi made under the reformed Five Weapons Society are recruited by Chieftain Xin, who holds a grudge against Zheng Zu and his bloodline ever since Zu attempted to steal sacred weapons from Ta-Lo to bolster the Society in the past. Believing Shang-Chi to be just as corrupt as his father, Xin dispatches his allies to assassinate his grandson, but are thwarted by the Society. However, Xin resorts to kidnapping his daughter and Shang-Chi's mother Jiang Li. When, Shang-Chi proves impossible to defeat in combat, Xin resorts to creating several taotie to destroy anyone possessing the Zheng lineage, forcing Shang-Chi to rescue Brother Sabre and Sister Hammer from Xin's attacks and invites them back into the Society. The Society builds a gateway connecting the House of the Deadly Hand to Ta-Lo, which Shang-Chi and the House Champions take to rescue Jiang Li and to stop Xin. Jiang Li was able to escape her imprisonment and flees to the House of the Deadly Hand to warn the Society of an attack from Xin's Qilin Riders, who are with taotie masks. The Society then engages in battle with the Riders to defend their headquarters. The Riders are eventually joined by Xin, wearing his own mask and possessing six of the Ten Rings. Shang-Chi and his siblings arrive with the remaining four Rings, but Xin is able to claim them from Shang-Chi and orders his men to attack New York City. Shang-Chi gives in to his dark desires to reclaim the Ten Rings, which unlock their full potential but also give him the appearance and personality of Zheng Zu. Shang-Chi is able to easily defeat Xin and the Qilin Riders with the Ten Rings but nearly executes Xin until his family intervenes, bringing him back to his senses. The Five Weapons Society repairs the damage done to the city and tend to wounded civilians, which reveal their existence and Shang-Chi's leadership to the public but has them lauded them as heroes, repairing Shang-Chi's relationship with the Avengers.

Several Society members disgruntled with Shang-Chi's rule recover Zheng Zu's remains and attempt to use them as part of a ritual to summon a younger version of Zheng Zu from the past to take over the Society. The ritual is thwarted by Shang-Chi and the House Champions but Shang-Chi is temporarily sent back in time to the First Opium War where he encounters younger versions of Zheng Zu and Zheng Yi and that era's Deadly Warriors.

=== Gang War ===
Despite Shang-Chi's assumption of leadership and his subsequent efforts to redirect the organization's objectives, the Five Weapons Society continued to maintain its operational status as a tong within New York City. Although not all tongs are criminal in nature, the Society's long-standing history as an organized crime syndicate nonetheless informed its role and reputation. This context is particularly relevant during the "Gang War" storyline, in which the Society is featured as one of the many criminal factions vying for control following the assassination attempt on Tombstone and the resulting power vacuum in New York's underworld. Due to the close proximities of their territories, Chinatown and Two Bridges, the Society intervenes in the turf war between Mister Negative and Lady Yulan. Despite the Society's victories in the Gang War, their territories are usurped by Madame Masque and Tombstone, along with all of the other territories within New York's criminal underworld.

== Other versions ==
=== Earth-79816 ===
Shang-Chi believes that his Zheng Zu is a benefactor, he is shown to be loyal to Zheng Zu and the Five Weapons Society.

== In other media ==
=== Role-playing games ===
Fu Manchu and the Si-Fan appears in the adventures After Midnight, Night Moves and Night Live for the role-playing game Marvel Super Heroes.

Shang-Chi's profile in the Marvel Multiverse Role-Playing Game is updated and mentions that he is the Supreme Commander of the Five Weapons Society.

=== Films ===
==== Marvel Cinematic Universe ====
In the film Shang-Chi and the Legend of the Ten Rings (2021), Shang-Chi's father is Xu Wenwu, a composed character of Zheng Zu and the Mandarin, he leads the secret organization Ten Rings, which bears similarities to the Five Weapons Society. After Wenwu's death, the Ten Rings are led by his daughter Xu Xialing.
