= The Face of Fu Manchu =

1965 British film by Don Sharp

- Theatrical release poster by Mitchell Hooks
- Directed by: Don Sharp
- Screenplay by: Peter Welbeck
- Based on: Fu Manchu by Sax Rohmer
- Produced by: Harry Alan Towers
- Starring: Christopher Lee; Nigel Green; Joachim Fuchsberger; Karin Dor; Tsai Chin; James Robertson Justice
- Cinematography: Ernest Steward
- Edited by: John Trumper
- Music by: Christopher Whelen
- Production companies: Hallam Productions; Constantin Film
- Distributed by: Anglo-Amalgamated; Warner-Pathé (UK); Constantin Film (West Germany)
- Release date: 6 August 1965
- Running time: 96 minutes
- Countries: United Kingdom; West Germany
- Language: English
- Budget: £150,000 or $700,000
- Box office: $1.3 million

The Face of Fu Manchu is a 1965 thriller film directed by Don Sharp and based on the characters created by Sax Rohmer. It stars Christopher Lee as the eponymous villain, a Chinese criminal mastermind, and Nigel Green as his pursuing rival Nayland Smith, a Scotland Yard detective.

The film was a British-West German co-production, and was the first in a five-part series starring Lee and produced by Harry Alan Towers for Constantin Film, the second of which was The Brides of Fu Manchu released the next year, with the final entry being The Castle of Fu Manchu in 1969. Only the first two were directed by Sharp.

It was shot in Technicolor and Techniscope on location in County Dublin, Ireland. The film has been called Towers' best movie.

== Plot ==
The beheading of Dr Fu Manchu is witnessed in China by his nemesis, Nayland Smith. Back in London, however, it is increasingly apparent to Smith—now assistant commissioner in Scotland Yard— that the international criminal mastermind is still operating. Smith determines that a hypnotized actor took Dr Fu Manchu's place. The villain kidnaps the esteemed Professor Muller, whose research holds the key to realizing an ancient Tibetan legend. A deadly poison created from the seeds of a rare Tibetan flower—the Blackhill poppy—is supposed to carry the secret of eternal life. A pint of this poison is powerful enough to kill every person and animal in London.

Nayland Smith correctly deduces that Professor Muller received his supply of Blackhill poppy seeds from illegal drug trade. When Fu Manchu cut off the drug trade, the poppy seeds could only be acquired from Hanuman, a warehouse owner who is secretly in cahoots with Fu Manchu.

Nayland Smith meets Hanuman in his warehouse to question him on the whereabouts of Professor Muller. Hanuman pulls a gun on Smith, who is able to knock him out and flee.

Smith deliberately ignores Hanuman's secretary, whom he recognizes as Lin Tang, Fu Manchu's daughter and partner-in-crime. Lin Tang recognized Nayland Smith and told Hanuman to kill him.

Hanuman and Lin Tang go to a secret base under the River Thames. There, Lin Tang informs her father that his nemesis is interfering with their plans. Meanwhile, Professor Muller has refused to divulge how to extract the poisonous essence from the seeds. Fu Manchu has his henchmen kidnap the professor's daughter, Maria. After watching the execution-by-drowning of one of Fu Manchu's female servants, Professor Muller reveals that the Grand Lama gave key documents to Professor Gaskel during the Younghusband expedition and are currently locked in a vault in a guarded room of the Museum of Oriental Studies.

Disguised, Lin Tang infiltrates the museum and plants a listening device. Their henchmen enter through the sewers and are killed by Nayland Smith and his allies, who discover that Gaskel has emptied the vault. Lin Tan hears all. She and her father escape, emerging in Gaskel's study where Fu Manchu hypnotizes Professor Gaskel. In Fu Manchu's underground lair, Professor Gaskel and Professor Muller translate the Younghusband papers on stabilising the poisonous essence at room temperature.

Fu Manchu learns that the Essex village of Fleetwick is under freezing temperatures: The seeds' poisonous properties will persist if used there. A radio broadcast to the entire country announces his return, and demands obedience. He kills everyone in Fleetwick, including the soldiers Nayland Smith sent there to protect it, by spraying the poison from a plane onto 3000 people.

Professor Gaskel, his usefulness now over, has been hypnotized into committing suicide.

Nayland Smith and his associates determine the location of Fu Manchu's hideout. They plan to flood it by breaking in through the hidden entrance in Hanuman's warehouse. They confront Fu Manchu and his minions, and a brawl ensues. After the lights go out, Fu Manchu and his followers escape to a Tibetan monastery with Professor Muller while the River Thames hideout is flooded. Nayland Smith and his team escape the underground hideout via an exit that leads to a graveyard.

Nayland Smith and company go to Tibet and find Fu Manchu at a Tibetan monastery receiving Blackhill poppy seeds from the Grand Lama. Professor Muller informs them that Fu Manchu already has all the knowledge and poppy seeds he needs to bring the world to its knees. Nayland Smith reassures Professor Muller by revealing that he has a detonator hidden underneath the poppy seeds in one of Fu Manchu's boxes. Nayland Smith, Professor Muller, and their allies leave the monastery. A frustrated Fu Manchu ponders why Nayland Smith did not take the poppy seeds with him. A few seconds later, Smith's detonator goes off and the monastery grounds burst into an enormous ball of flame.

Nayland Smith is riding horseback with his allies and sees the explosion from afar. The film ends with a medium closeup of Fu Manchu fading in over the explosion, and his voice saying, "The world shall hear from me again... the world shall hear from me again".

== Cast ==
Credits adapted from the booklet of the Powerhouse Films Blu-ray boxset The Fu Manchu Cycle: 1965-1969.

- Christopher Lee as Fu Manchu
- Nigel Green as Nayland Smith
- Joachim Fuchsberger as Carl Jannsen
- Karin Dor as Maria Muller
- James Robertson Justice as Sir Charles
- Howard Marion-Crawford as Dr Petrie
- Tsai Chin as Lin Tang
- Walter Rilla as Professor Muller
- Harry Brogan as Professor Gaskel
- Poulet Tu as Lotus
- Edwin Richfield as Chief Magistrate
- Joe Lynch as Custodian
- Archie O'Sullivan as Chamberlain
- Peter Mossbacher as Hanumon
- Eric Young as Grand Lama
- Deborah DeLacey as Slave Girl
- Jim Norton as Mathius
- Jack O'Reilly as Constable
- Peter Mayock as Soldier
- Kevin Flood as Traffic Policeman
- John Franklyn as Morgue Attendant
- Conor Evans as River Police Officer
- Derek Young as Village Official

Uncredited:

- Peter Diamond as Dacoit
- George Leech as Dacoit
- Malcolm Jones as Executioner
- Dave Lally as Village Boy

== Production ==
=== Development ===
The film was the idea of producer Harry Alan Towers, who said he decided that "the time was ripe for Fu Manchu. It has all the ingredients of Sherlock Holmes plus a touch of the Kaiser's Yellow Peril. I bet more people have heard of Fu Manchu than Mao Tse-Tung. And anyway these days you couldn't have a better nationality for a villain."

Sax Rohmer had died in 1959 and Towers bought the film rights for Fu Manchu off Rohmer's widow for a reported $70,000. Towers called Fu Manchu "the best damn villain ever created." (In 1963 MGM reported it had hired Charles Beamont to write The Mask of Fu Manchu for producer Henry Weinstein but the film was never made.

Towers said his intention from the beginning was to make "four or five of these" but denied the films were made to cash in on the James Bond craze:

No relationship. Action, adventure, open-air, escapism – yes – but nothing to do with Bond-ism – Fu Manchu's atmosphere is a kind of timeless Never Never land. Bond is gimmicky and with-it.

Sax Rohmer's widow said "poor old Ian Fleming pinched Fu Manchu for Dr No and claimed she even asked Fleming to ghost write some new Fu Manchu books but the author declined.

Towers decided to make it a period film (it is set in 1912) because it "adds to the plausibility".

Don Sharp said he was recommended as director by the film's completion guarantor. Harry Alan Towers' previous films had been going over budget and schedule, and the producer had to use a new director; Sharp's name was put forward and the film began an association between Sharp and Towers.

Sharp said "you never know what his [Fu Manchu's] motives are. I mean, he may want to rule the world, blow it up, corner the gold or seduce all the women. The script doesn't say. So we just keep everything moving fast so the audience doesn't have time to think 'but that's impossible' until they get outside."

"There's not much sex in the books," said Towers, "but we've remedied that. We've got damsels in distress, a woman kidnapped, slave girls whipped. It's very kinky." (Towers had been arrested in New York in 1961 for bringing a woman into the country for the purposes of prostitution. He escaped the country on bail.) "You know what it is today with all this sex stuff," reflected Rohmer's widow. "There's none of this in Sax's book. Only exotic ladies."

According to Lee, Mrs Rohmer told him "I exactly resembled the man her husband had seen one night in foggy Limehouse, a tall and imposing Oriental, getting out of a Rolls with an elegant half-caste girl, who had given him the idea for the book."

=== Shooting ===
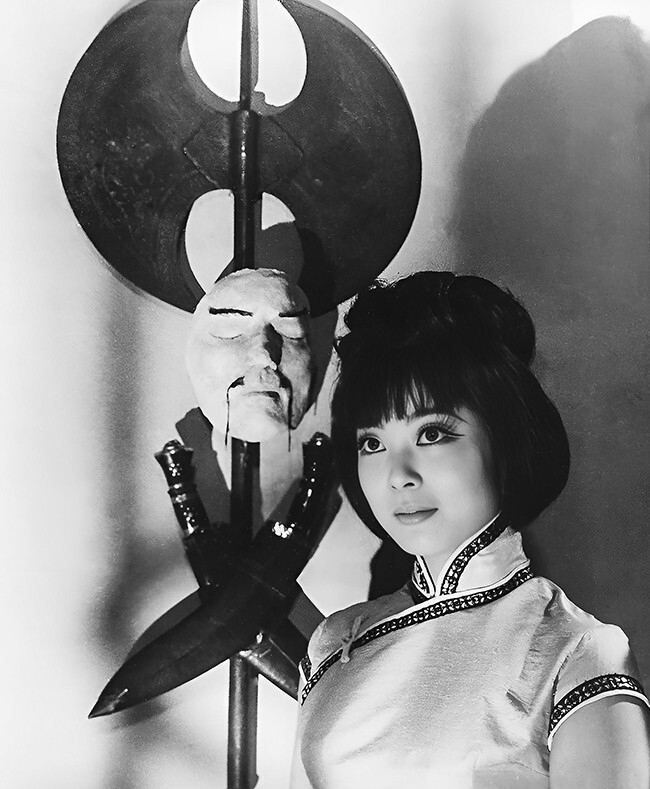
Tsai Chin in a publicity picture of the film

Filming took place between 20 February and 25 March 1965. The film was shot on location in Ireland, with Towers commenting:

It's a good country for location work; the British quota helps; on costs, there is not much difference between making a film here and in Britain – both sets of unions see to that. Ardmore? It seems to be doing alright with the present film – and Ireland will always be attractive as long as filmmakers and their artists are seeking refuge from super tax.

Lee recalled "The conditions were execrable. The weather was bleak and miserable. Everyone on the unit was croaking under the impact of flu. The elderly German actor Walter Rilla almost died. We worked in a number of ramshackle, dilapidated dwellings abandoned by their occupants and the water ran all the time down the walls."

The main location was the deserted Kenure House in Rush, County Dublin. Other scenes were shot in Skerries, Dublin docks and Kilmainham Gaol. Director Don Sharp said Harry Alan Towers had to pay off members of the IRA so they could film at the prison.

In his memoirs, Lee praised the "decisive" direction of Sharp:

I was desperately in need of a sure direction, and he was just the man to provide it. As a rule I believed in approaching a new picture with the idea of the script as no more than a guideline, partly because it will be changed and I'd seen actors who were word-perfect completely floored by the differences, and partly because there must be some room tor good ideas to sprout spontaneously, but with Don there was no uncertainty. He d spent a couple of years on a script and when he called the opening shot he had the whole thing worked out to his own satisfaction. He wanted every word on the page spoken and in the same order.

Lee also recalled the make up for his role was complication. "It took two and a half hours to put on and left me extremely uncomfortable. My features were rendered immobile— I had only my eyes left with which to act. And at that, my eyelids were fixed and unable to blink."

== Soundtrack ==
The British version of the film was scored by Christopher Whelen, while the German release version was scored by Gert Wilden. A tie-in song, "Don't Fool with Fu Manchu" performed by The Rockin' Ramrods, was not heard in the film.

== Release ==
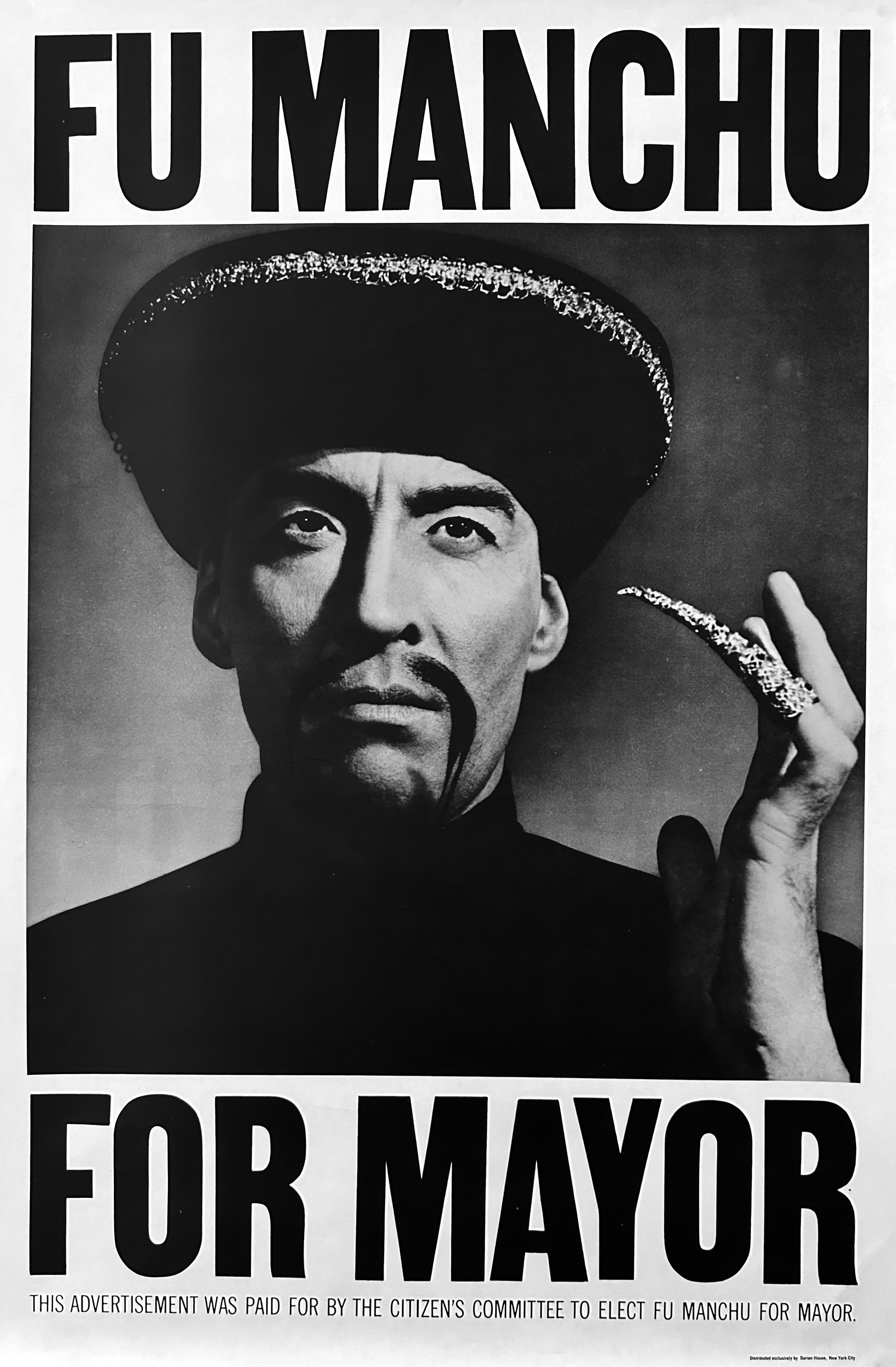
The "Fu Manchu For Mayor" poster that was used to promote the movie in New York

The film was sold to Seven Arts for US release for $200,000.

In order to promote the film in the U.S., "Fu Manchu for Mayor" posters were done up and distributed in New York City during the mayoral election.

== Reception ==
=== Critical ===
The New York Times did not like the film, saying:

The Face of Fu Manchu, back again after all these years, is about as frightening as Whistler's Mother. If this slow, plodding, simple-minded little color melodrama were not so excruciating, it might have been acceptable farce. Christopher Lee, as the old evil one, complete with waxy mustache, looks and sounds like an overgrown Etonite. Fu Manchu, fooey.

Rohmer's widow called the film "really quite good. They didn't stick to the book, but they did it very well. They kept it in the right period and mood, which was clever. I don't like the idea of Fu Manchu being bought up to date."

=== Box office ===
The film was commercially successful enough to result in four sequels. "The first one should have been the last one", Lee wrote in 1983, "because it was the only really good one."

Towers would also make two films based on another Sax Rohmer character, Sumuru.

== Sequels ==
- The Brides of Fu Manchu (1966)
- The Vengeance of Fu Manchu (1967)
- The Blood of Fu Manchu (1968)
- The Castle of Fu Manchu (1969)

== Notes ==
- Lee, Christopher (1999). Tall, dark, and gruesome. Midnight Marquee Press.
