= Zheng Bao Yu =

Marvel Comics fictional villain

Publication information
- Publisher: Marvel Comics
- First appearance: As Fah Lo Suee: Master of Kung Fu #26 (cover-dated March 1975); As Cursed Lotus: Journey into Mystery #514-516 (1997-1998); As Zheng Bao Yu: Fearless Defenders #8 (cover-dated October 2013)
- Created by: Sax Rohmer; Adapted by: Doug Moench and Keith Pollard

In-story information
- Team affiliations: Doom Maidens; Celestial Order of the Hai Dai; Celestial Order of the Si-Fan; Golden Daggers; Oriental Expeditors; MI-6
- Notable aliases: Fah lo Suee; Cursed Lotus
- Abilities: Genius-level intellect Hypnosis; Martial arts expert Longevity; Master sorcerer

Zheng Bao Yu (originally known as Fah Lo Suee) is a supervillain appearing in American comic books published by Marvel Comics. She is the daughter of Zheng Zu and the older half-sister of Shang-Chi.

The character debuted in Master of Kung Fu #26 (cover-dated March 1975) in the Bronze Age of Comic Books, under the name Fah Lo Suee, based on the Sax Rohmer character of the same name. She was created by writer Sax Rohmer, and adapted into Marvel Comics by Doug Moench and Keith Pollard. Due to Marvel losing the rights to Fu Manchu and related characters, her name Fah Lo Suee was changed to Zheng Bao Yu.

== Publication history ==
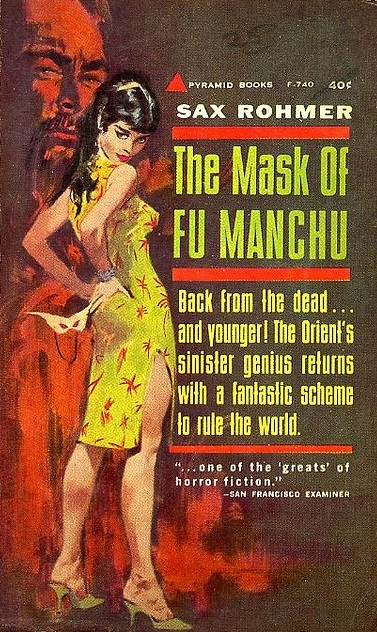
Fah Lo Suee in the cover of The Mask of Fu Manchu by Sax Rohmer. Illustration by Ronnie Lesser, 1962.

The character of Fah lo Suee was created in 1917 by Sax Rohmer as the Lady of the Si-Fan in the novel The Hand of Fu-Manchu (original UK title: The Si-Fan Mysteries). In the novel Daughter of Fu Manchu (1931), she is called Fah lo Suee, a nickname meaning "Sweet Perfume". Fah Lo Suee is a devious mastermind in her own right, frequently plotting to usurp her father's position in the Si-Fan and aiding his enemies both within and outside the organization.

In the early 1970s, writer Steve Englehart and artist Jim Starlin approached DC Comics to adapt the television series Kung Fu into a comic book, as DC's parent company, Warner Communications, owned the rights to the series. DC Comics, however, was not interested in their pitch, believing the popularity of the show and the martial arts genre was short-lived. The duo then approached Marvel Comics with the idea to create a kung fu-focused original comic. Editor-in-chief Roy Thomas agreed, but only if they would include Sax Rohmer's pulp villain Fu Manchu, because Marvel had previously acquired the comic book rights to the character. Englehart and Starlin developed Shang-Chi, a master of kung fu and a previously unknown son of Fu Manchu. At first, only a few characters were adapted from the Fu Manchu series, such as Dr. Petrie and Denis Nayland Smith, with whom Fah lo Suee has a romance in the novels. In Master of Kung Fu #26 (cover-dated March 1975), Doug Moench and Keith Pollard adapted Fah lo Suee for the series. She becomes an ally of Shang-Chi and MI-6. When Marvel's license with the Rohmer estate expired in 1983, Master of Kung Fu was cancelled. Fah lo Suee became the director of MI-6. Despite subsequent issues referring to characters from the novels cryptically or phasing them out entirely, Fah lo Suee reappeared in Journey into Mystery #514–516, (1997-1998) leading a drug cartel in Hong Kong under the name Cursed Lotus. In 2010's Secret Avengers #6–10, writer Ed Brubaker officially sidestepped the entire issue in a storyline in which the Shadow Council resurrects a zombified version of Fu Manchu, only to discover that "Fu Manchu" was only an alias for Zheng Zu, an ancient Chinese sorcerer who discovered the secret to immortality and the Si-Fan is renamed the Hai-Dai. Similarly, Fah Lo Suee was renamed Zheng Bao Yu in 2013's The Fearless Defenders #8, written by Cullen Bunn, where she appears leading the Hai-Dai.

In more recent stories by Gene Luen Yang, there is no mention of Zheng Bao Yu. Yang created other sisters for Shang-Chi. In the miniseries Shang-Chi (2020), Si-Fan and Hai-Dai are names for the Five Weapons Society. Zheng Shi-Hua is Bao Yu's replacement in Shang-Chi's origin story.

== Fictional character biography ==
Born many decades ago as the daughter of the criminal mastermind Fu Manchu, Fah Lo Suee originally followed in her father's footsteps. Eventually, Fah Lo Suee became disillusioned by her father's misguided idealism for world conquest and developed a more pragmatic mindset. After obtaining her own faction of Fu Manchu's Si-Fan assassins, Fah Lo Suee would attempt to sway Shang-Chi into helping her usurp their father from his criminal empire, only to be rebuffed by her heroic half-brother. Fah Lo Suee would eventually lead her own criminal organization, the Oriental Expeditors, who were a front for the Golden Daggers sect. After Shang-Chi and his allies bring down the Golden Daggers, she briefly allies herself with them to help take down Fu Manchu.

After collaborating with British Intelligence, Fah Loh Suee was eventually placed as a director of MI-6. Her endeavors perpetually placed her at odds with Shang-Chi and his fellow MI-6 agents. Years later, she once again became involved in the criminal underworld. Now going by the name the Cursed Lotus, she headed a narcotics empire supplying a highly addictive drug, Wild Tiger, with the Wild Tiger Mob, one of the factions of her father's organization led by Deng Ling-Xiao, acting as a front for her in Hong Kong. Despite the Wild Tiger mob being brought down by Shang-Chi, she eludes capture. Shang-Chi never discovers his half-sister's involvement.

Zheng Bao Yu is recruited by Caroline le Fay, the daughter of Morgana le Fey and Doctor Doom, into Caroline's incarnation of the Doom Maidens. Now in full control of Zheng Zu's Hai Dai assassins (formerly called Si-Fan), she resumes her father's long-forgotten experiment of bio-engineering Brood eggs as weapons. The Brood hatchlings from the eggs are used to carry out hits in New York's Chinatown by the Ghost Boys gang at the behest of Bao Yu. The plot is uncovered by Misty Knight and Annabelle Riggs of the Fearless Defenders with help from Elsa Bloodstone; the three track Bao Yu and her Hai Dai assassins and scientists to an underground laboratory (where Bao Yu reveals her real name to the group). With the help of No-Name of the Brood, the Fearless Defenders defeat the Hai-Dai and destroy the experiments, forcing Bao Yu to teleport away from her lair; she later confronts Caroline for not providing her with enough protection. Bao Yu joins Caroline and the other Doom Maidens for a ritual to grant Caroline the powers she has been craving. The ritual is interrupted by the Fearless Defenders, who defeat Bao Yu and the other Doom Maidens in the subsequent battle, with Frankie Raye siphoning the energy from the ritual, preventing Caroline from completing her transformation. However, Caroline still manages to succeed in the secondary ritual of restoring her mother, Morgana le Fey.

== Powers and abilities ==
Zheng Bao Yu possesses superhuman longevity, due to her consumption of the Elixir Vitae. Much like her father, she is a devious and cunning criminal mastermind and is a genius in most fields of knowledge, including alchemy and sorcery. As with her half-brother and father, she is also an expert hand-to-hand combatant. Bao Yu is also hypnotically seductive: her voice and movements command attention, and her eyes can entrance a man in moments. She has easily manipulated a variety of men into falling in love with her, devoted to serving her wishes. She occasionally uses scented vapors or hypnotic rubies to further enhance her skills.

== In other media ==
=== Role-playing games ===
Fah Lo Suee appears in the adventure Night Moves for the role-playing game Marvel Super Heroes.

=== Marvel Cinematic Universe ===
The Marvel Cinematic Universe features Xu Xialing (portrayed by Meng'er Zhang), a character based on Zheng Bao Yu, Sister Dagger, and Sasha Hammer.

- Xialing appears in Shang-Chi and the Legend of the Ten Rings, where she is portrayed as Shang-Chi's sister who had run away from home to start her own undercity group. She is eventually brought back to her father Wenwu, where it is revealed that she had been prevented from training, forcing her to train in secret. Then she started a fight club called Golden Daggers Club in Macau where she reunited with Shang-Chi. When the Ten Rings attack it to claim Xialing's pendant, she helps to fight them and protect Shang-Chi's friend Katy until Wenwu breaks up the resulting brawl. When in Ta Lo, Xialing helps to fight the Ten Rings and later the minions of the Dweller-in-Darkness. Afterwards, her bond with her brother is renewed. However, she opts to take over the Ten Rings, restructuring it to include female members.
- An alternate universe variant of Xu Xialing appear in What If...?.
