= The Brides of Fu Manchu =

1966 British film by Don Sharp

- Theatrical release poster
- Directed by: Don Sharp
- Screenplay by: Peter Welbeck
- Based on: Fu Manchu by Sax Rohmer
- Produced by: Harry Alan Towers; David Henley
- Starring: Christopher Lee; Douglas Wilmer; Heinz Drache; Marie Versini; Howard Marion-Crawford; Tsai Chin; Rupert Davies; Roger Hanin
- Cinematography: Ernest W. Steward
- Edited by: Allan Morrison
- Music by: Bruce Montgomery
- Production companies: Fu Manchu Films; Constantin Film
- Distributed by: Anglo-Amalgamated; Warner-Pathé (UK); Constantin Film (West Germany)
- Release date: 2 September 1966
- Running time: 93 minutes
- Countries: United Kingdom; West Germany
- Language: English

The Brides of Fu Manchu is a 1966 British/West German Constantin Film co-production adventure crime film based on the fictional Chinese villain Dr. Fu Manchu, created by Sax Rohmer. It was the second film in a series, and was preceded by The Face of Fu Manchu. The Vengeance of Fu Manchu followed in 1967, The Blood of Fu Manchu in 1968, and The Castle of Fu Manchu in 1969. It was produced by Harry Alan Towers for Hallam Productions. Like the first film, it was directed by Don Sharp, and starred Christopher Lee as Fu Manchu. Nigel Green was replaced by Douglas Wilmer as Scotland Yard detective Nayland Smith.

The action takes place mainly in London, where much of the location filming took place.

== Plot ==
In 1924, Dr. Fu Manchu, his army of dacoits and his vicious daughter Lin Tang are kidnapping the daughters of prominent scientists and taking them to his hidden base in the Atlas Mountains, where he demands that their fathers help him to build a device that transmits blast waves through a radio transmitter, which he intends to use to take over the world. He plans to keep (even wed) the girls in question. But Dr. Fu Manchu's archenemy, Nayland Smith of Scotland Yard, is determined not to let that happen.

== Cast ==
Credits adapted from the booklet of the Powerhouse Films Blu-ray boxset The Fu Manchu Cycle: 1965-1969.

- Christopher Lee as Fu Manchu
- Douglas Wilmer as Nayland Smith
- Heinz Drache as Franz Baumer
- Marie Versini as Marie Lentz
- Howard Marion-Crawford as Dr. Petrie
- Tsai Chin as Lin Tang
- Rupert Davies as Jules Merlin
- Kenneth Fortescue as Sergeant Spicer
- Joseph Fürst as Otto Lentz
- Roger Hanin as Inspector Pierre Grimaldi
- Harald Leipnitz as Nikki Sheldon
- Carole Gray as Michel Merlin
- Burt Kwouk as Feng
- Salmaan Peerzada as Abdul
- Eric Young as Control Assistant
- Wendy Gifford as Louise
- Poulet Tu as Lotus
- Sally Sheridan as Shiva
- Denis Holmes as Constable
- Maureen Beck as Nurse Brown
- Michael Chow as Guard
- Kristopher Kum as Wireless Operator
- Tommy Yapp as Dacoit

The Brides of Fu Manchu (all uncredited)

- Ulla Berglin
- Danielle Defrère
- Évelyne Dhéliat
- Yvonne Ekmann
- Anje Langstraat
- Katerina Quest
- Lucille Soong
- Christine Rau
- Gaby Schär

== Production ==
Sharp recalled producer Harry Alan Towers used the film to showcase "young and beautiful actresses". It was shot at Bray Film Studios (UK). Nigel Green was not available to repeat his performance as Nayland Smith so he was replaced by Douglas Wilmer. Sharp recalled filming went "smoothly but already the signs were there that" Towers could make Fu Manchu movies without having to "worry too much because the stories were okay. Well, there was more to making the movies than that."

== Critical response ==
Writing in DVD Talk, film critic Glenn Erickson described the film as a "vaguely 007-inspired thriller," that "Christopher Lee is imposing in false eyelids and a long moustache," and that director Sharp "keeps the action humming."
