= The Fiendish Plot of Dr. Fu Manchu =

1980 film by Peter Sellers, Richard Quine

- Original film poster
- Directed by: Piers Haggard
- Written by: Rudy Dochtermann; Jim Moloney; Peter Sellers
- Produced by: Zev Braun; Leland Nolan
- Starring: Peter Sellers; Helen Mirren; David Tomlinson; Sid Caesar; John Le Mesurier
- Cinematography: Jean Tournier
- Edited by: Claudine Bouché; Russell Lloyd
- Music by: Marc Wilkinson
- Production companies: Orion Pictures; Braun Entertainment Group; Playboy Productions
- Distributed by: Warner Bros. (through Columbia-EMI-Warner Distributors in the UK)
- Release date: 8 August 1980
- Running time: 101 minutes
- Countries: United Kingdom; United States
- Language: English
- Box office: $10.7 million

The Fiendish Plot of Dr. Fu Manchu is a 1980 comedy film, most notable as the final film of Peter Sellers. Based on characters created by Sax Rohmer, the movie stars Sellers in the dual role of Fu Manchu, a megalomaniacal Chinese evil genius, and his nemesis, English gentleman detective Nayland Smith.

Pre-production began with Richard Quine as director. By the time production commenced, Piers Haggard had replaced him. Sellers handled the re-shoots himself. Released two weeks after Sellers' death, the movie was a commercial and critical failure. It was also the final film appearance for David Tomlinson, who retired from acting shortly before its release.

== Plot ==
The film's opening titles announce it is set "possibly around 1933." The story concerns the 168-year-old Fu Manchu, who must duplicate the ingredients to the elixir vitae that extends his life after the original is accidentally destroyed by one of his minions.

When the Star of Leningrad diamond is stolen by a clockwork spider from a Soviet exhibition in Washington D.C., the FBI sends a pair of special agents (agents Pete Williams and Joe Capone) to London, in order to seek the assistance of Scotland Yard as a card from Fu Manchu's organisation, the Si-Fan, has been left at the crime. Sir Roger Avery of the Yard feels this is a job for Fu's nemesis, Sir Denis Nayland Smith, now retired.

Nayland Smith correctly surmises that Fu Manchu will steal the missing diamond's identical twin, held among the Crown Jewels of the United Kingdom in the Tower of London. Smith also predicts that Fu will be thwarted by the tight security (several aged Beefeaters) at the Tower, then will kidnap Queen Mary to gain the jewel. He recruits Alice Rage, a female police constable, to impersonate the Queen and fool Fu's gang. Rage is soon captured by Fu, but the plan backfires somewhat when she falls in love with her captor. She switches sides and willingly helps Fu.

The Crown Jewels are guarded by Sir Nules Thudd, an obese Chinese-cuisine-loving glutton. Thudd has obesity-related health problems, and has been ordered by the doctor to walk around for 5 mi (8.0 km) a day on stilts. He is promised access to Fu's outdoor restaurant of Chinese food, and in return, he helps the Si-Fan steal the diamond. Fu steals the rest of the Crown Jewels as well.

Nayland Smith then uses his flying country house, The Spirit of Wiltshire, to transport himself and his fellow officers all the way to Fu Manchu's mountain base in the Himalayas. Meanwhile, Fu has recreated the elixir vitae, only to find that it has no effect on him – one of the ingredients used was faulty.

Nayland Smith's country house is soon besieged by an army of Si-Fan. Nayland Smith demands an audience with Fu, and is transported to his old enemy, who is in poor health by this point. Nayland Smith reveals that he has hidden the real diamond. Fu offers to return the Crown Jewels in exchange for the diamond. Once Nayland Smith hands over the diamond, Fu has a new elixir vitae prepared for him. Fu becomes young and vibrant again.

Fu willingly hands over the Crown Jewels to Nayland Smith's allies. He also has a diamond identical to the Star of Leningrad handed over to Capone, arguing that the Russians will not see any difference. In a private meeting, Fu expresses his appreciation of Nayland Smith, who has been the only worthy adversary of his life. He offers Nayland Smith part of the elixir vitae, but asks him not to drink it until he returns to London. Fu warns Nayland Smith that his latest fiendish plot will wipe out his enemies.

Nayland Smith rejoins his fellow officers in time to see a rejuvenated Fu Manchu sporting an Elvis Presley-type jumpsuit. Fu rises from the floor, and his cohorts now form a rock band. They sing the song "Rock-a-Fu", as the story ends.

== Cast ==
- Peter Sellers as Fu Manchu / Sir Denis Nayland Smith
- Helen Mirren as Alice Rage
- David Tomlinson as Sir Roger Avery
- Sid Caesar as Joe Capone
- Simon Williams as Robert Townsend
- Steve Franken as Pete Williams
- Stratford Johns as Ismail
- John Le Mesurier as Perkins
- John Sharp as Sir Nules Thudd
- Clive Dunn as Keeper of the Keys, Tower of London
- Clément Harari as Dr. Wretch
- Burt Kwouk as Servant
- Kwan-Young Lee as Tong
- John Tan, Philip Tan, Serge Julien, and Johns Rajohnson as Dacoity
- Katia Tchenko as Tour Guide

Sellers also appears in an uncredited cameo as a Mexican bandito.

== Background ==
Sellers had previously recorded a 1955 Goon Show entitled "The Terrible Revenge of Fred Fu-Manchu" set in 1895. In the film, his Fu insists friends call him "Fred" and that he had once been the groundsman at Eton.

In addition to Sellers, the film features Sid Caesar as FBI agent Joe Capone, David Tomlinson as Scotland Yard Commissioner Sir Roger Avery, Simon Williams as his bumbling nephew and Helen Mirren as Police Constable Alice Rage (Mirren sings the Music Hall standard, "Daddy Wouldn't Buy Me a Bow Wow").

Burt Kwouk, Sellers' co-star in The Pink Panther films with the character of Cato, makes a brief cameo appearance as a Fu Manchu minion who accidentally destroys the elixir vitae, prompting the joke that Fu thinks he looks familiar. John Le Mesurier, who appeared opposite Sellers in the original Pink Panther, Only Two Can Play and The Magic Christian, has a small part in the film as Smith's butler, and Steve Franken, who played the tipsy waiter opposite Sellers in The Party, returns as an FBI agent.

Unlike other Fu Manchu works, the characters of Fu's daughter Fah Lo Suee, and Nayland Smith's friend Dr. Petrie, do not appear in the film.

== Production ==
In 1976, Robert Kaufman was writing the script for Fu Manchu to star Peter Sellers and Michael Caine.

Troubles with the film began during pre-production, when two directors—Richard Quine and John Avildsen—were both fired before the script had been completed. Sellers also expressed dissatisfaction with his own portrayal of Manchu with his declining health often causing delays. Arguments between Sellers and director Piers Haggard led to Haggard's firing at Sellers's instigation with Sellers taking over and his long-time friend David Lodge directing some sequences.

The making of the film was quite tense, with Sellers interfering in practically every aspect of the film's production, despite his worsening health problems. Haggard later recalled:

It was a very disagreeable experience on that film. I was brought in on an off-chance. He [Sellers]'d agreed to do a fairly stock Hollywood comedy thriller, similar to The Pink Panther really, playing a detective and a villain. And he'd fallen out of love with that project and didn’t want to do that script. They said, 'Okay, what do you want to do?' and he said, 'Let me go off and do a bit of rewriting.' So he went off with a Hollywood hack and turned it into a series of Goon Show sketches. The executives were absolutely appalled. They thought, 'Oh my God, we thought he had a picture and now we’ve got a development situation.' I knew one of them, so they said, 'Maybe this guy Haggard could do something with this.' So I got three weeks' work to supervise a rewrite, which we did. We made Peter’s script much more coherent, turned it into something with a bit more of a beginning, middle and end. And they were very pleased with that so I got the gig. But then unfortunately within about two weeks my love affair with Peter Sellers was over but I had to soldier on. I did soldier on but it was no fun, absolutely no fun. Then just towards the end of the shooting he decided, which had been obvious, that either he would go or I would go so they got rid of me. I didn’t have much choice. So I was retired and he directed for the last week or so. It was pretty much a disaster from beginning to end.

== Reception ==
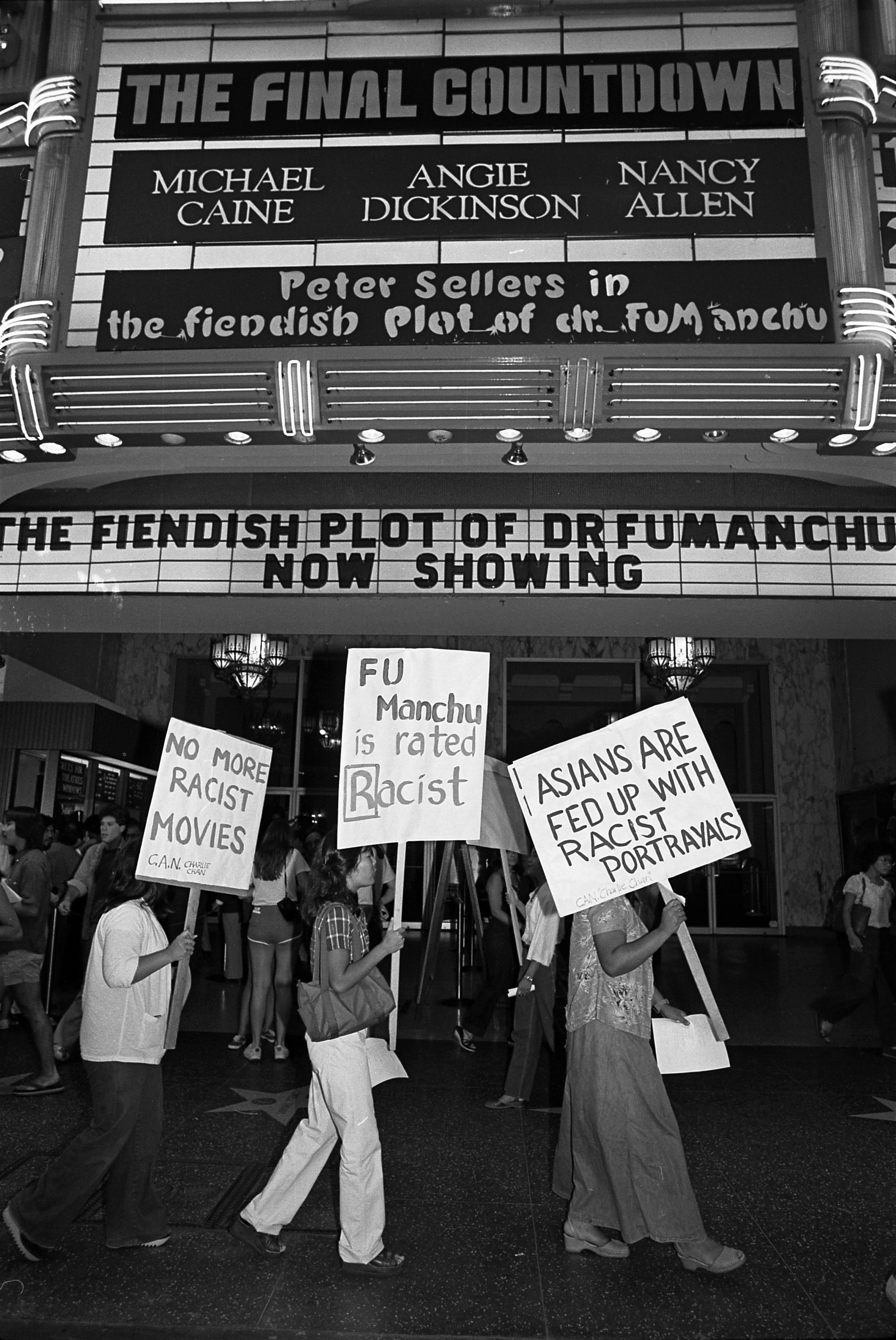
The Coalition of Asians to Nix Charlie Chan members picketing the film at the Hollywood Pacific Theatre in 1980

The Fiendish Plot of Dr. Fu Manchu was overwhelmingly panned by the critics. On Rotten Tomatoes, the film has an aggregated score of 15% based on 2 positive and 11 negative critic reviews.

Roger Ebert of The Chicago Sun-Times gave the film one star out of a possible four, writing that any Sellers movie was bound to have a few laughs "but the story never really involves us [and] the characters aren't all that interesting". Phil Hardy described the film as a "British atrocity". Orange Coast magazine wrote "Peter Sellers' last hurrah isn't nearly as impressive as his recent Being There. Even in the dual roles ... detective and the devious 168-year-old Fu Manchu, he musters only an occasional bright moment. Tom Shales of The Washington Post described the film as "an indefensibly inept comedy", adding that "it is hard to name another good actor who ever made so many bad movies as Sellers, a comedian of great gifts but ferociously faulty judgment. Manchu will take its rightful place alongside such colossally ill-advised washouts as Where Does It Hurt?, The Bobo and The Prisoner of Zenda".

The film has been criticized for contributing to racist Chinese stereotypes, a charge which has followed the Fu Manchu books from their earliest publication.

== Bibliography ==
- Evans, Peter (1980). The Mask Behind the Mask. London: Severn House Publishers. ISBN 978-0-7278-0688-8.
- Sikov, Ed (2002). Mr Strangelove; A Biography of Peter Sellers. London: Sidgwick & Jackson. ISBN 978-0-283-07297-0.
- Walker, Alexander (1981). Peter Sellers. Littlehampton: Littlehampton Book Services. ISBN 978-0-297-77965-0.
