= Zheng Zu =

Marvel Comics supervillain

Publication information
- Publisher: Marvel Comics
- First appearance: Fu Manchu: Special Marvel Edition #15 (cover-dated December 1973); Comte de Saint Germain: Shang-Chi: Master of Kung Fu #1 (cover-dated November 2002); As Zheng Zu: Secret Avengers #8 (cover-dated February 2011)
- Created by: Sax Rohmer; Adapted by: Steve Englehart; Al Milgrom; Jim Starlin

In-story information
- Alter ego: Zheng Zu
- Team affiliations: Si-Fan; Golden Dawn; Hai Dai; Shadow Council; Five Weapons Society
- Partnerships: Death-Dealer
- Notable aliases: Fu Manchu Wang Yu-Seng; Comte de Saint Germain; Ghost Han
- Abilities: Genius-level intellect Hypnosis; Martial arts expert Medical practitioner Longevity; Master sorcerer

Zheng Zu (Chinese: 鄭祖), originally known as Fu Manchu, is a supervillain appearing in American comic books published by Marvel Comics. Based on Sax Rohmer's character of the same name, he is the leader of the Five Weapons Society criminal organization and the father and arch-enemy of Shang-Chi.

The character debuted in Special Marvel Edition #15 (cover-dated December 1973) in the Bronze Age of Comic Books, under the name "Fu Manchu", based on the Sax Rohmer character of the same name and adapted into Marvel Comics by Steve Englehart and Jim Starlin. Due to Marvel losing the rights (Note: The rights belong to the Rohmer estate.) to the Fu Manchu character in 1983, the character was referred to simply as "Shang-Chi's father" and by a number of aliases over the following decades, before his name was changed to "Zheng Zu" in 2010.

Tony Leung Chiu-wai portrays a character partially inspired by Fu Manchu called Xu Wenwu in the Marvel Cinematic Universe film Shang-Chi and the Legend of the Ten Rings (2021).

== Publication history ==
The character of Dr. Fu Manchu was created in 1913 by Sax Rohmer. In the early 1970s, writer Steve Englehart and artist Jim Starlin approached Marvel Comics to adapt the television series Kung Fu into a comic book, as DC's parent company, Warner Communications, owned the rights to the series. The duo then approached Marvel Comics with the idea to create a kung fu-focused original comic. Editor-in-chief Roy Thomas agreed, but only if they would include Sax Rohmer's pulp villain Dr. Fu Manchu, as Marvel had previously acquired the comic book rights to the character. Englehart and Starlin developed Shang-Chi, a master of kung fu and a previously unknown son of Dr. Fu Manchu. After Marvel's license with the Rohmer estate expired, Master of Kung Fu was cancelled in 1983. in some of his modern appearances, mention is made of his villainous father either in cryptic terms or using a variety of new names. In 2010's Secret Avengers #6–10, writer Ed Brubaker officially sidestepped the entire issue via a storyline where the Shadow Council resurrects a zombified version of Dr. Fu Manchu, only to discover that "Dr. Fu Manchu" was only an alias and that Shang-Chi's father real name was Zheng Zu (Chinese: 鄭祖); in this arc, Zheng Zu's organization is called Hai-Dai. Shang-Chi's half sister Fah Lo Suee was later renamed Zheng Bao Yu in 2013's The Fearless Defenders #8, written by Cullen Bunn.

In 2020, Shang-Chi starred in a self-titled five issue miniseries written by American Born Chinese author Gene Luen Yang with art by Dike Ruan and Philip Tan. In the miniseries, it is revealed that Si-Fan and Hai-Dai were names used by the Five Weapons Society. It is said to be among the five sons of Zheng Zu, each one commands a house and from among them, the supreme leader, Shang-Chi, champion of the House of the Deadly Hand, is chosen by the father, but his sister Zheng Shi-Hua, Sister Hammer takes the lead after her father's death, in the miniseries, there is no mention of Zheng Bao Yu, Shi-Hua can be seen as Bao Yu's replacement in Shang-Chi's origin. Shang-Chi starred in a new ongoing series by Yang and Ruan in 2021, with Marcus To replacing Ruan by the 9th issue. Following the release of the Marvel Cinematic Universe film Shang-Chi and the Legend of the Ten Rings (2021), Yang incorporated several concepts introduced in the movie into the Shang-Chi mythos, including the character Jiang Li as Shang-Chi's real mother, who was based on Shang-Chi's mother Ying Li, (Note: The character's name in the film was initially announced as Jiang Li, even used on licensed products, however, it was changed to Ying Li.) retconning Shang-Chi's white American mother and his mixed-race heritage, which, as in the film, came from the heavenly realm Ta-Lo, which was previously introduced by writers Mark Gruenwald, Ralph Macchio and artist Keith Pollard in Thor #310 (1980); and the Ten Rings weapons. Like Wenwu, Zheng Zu invaded Ta-Lo and fell in love with Li, with whom he had two children.

== Fictional character biography ==
Born during the early Qing Dynasty, Zheng Zu gained his education at the Tibetan monastery of Rach where he learned martial arts, arcane knowledge, and every known discipline of science. Becoming highly regarded in his monastery, Zheng Zu was considered part of their brotherhood until the day he left to share his gifts with the world. A powerful sorcerer in his own right, Zu, along with his younger brother Zheng Yi and their five disciples, the Deadly Warriors, formed the Five Weapons Society to protect China.

The Ancient One, a fellow sorcerer and friend, provided the Zheng brothers the Eyes of the Dragon, a pair of stones that granted longevity and vigor while requiring the sacrifice of another. By 1860, the brothers prolonged their natural lifespans through the use of longevity spells and had grown weaker as a result. During the Second Opium War, the Society fought against British forces, but were defeated by Dormammu and the Mindless Ones summoned by the British sorcerer Baron Harkness, resulting in the death of the Deadly Warriors. Zu attempted to use the Eyes of the Dragon to save the fatally wounded Yi at the cost of his own life; not wanting to rule the Society alone, Yi reversed the spell, granting Zu immortality and restoring his youth, giving him the power to defeat the British forces. Following the death of his brother and the Deadly Warriors, Zu led the Society alone, establishing five houses in their honor. Without his brother's guidance, Zu lost his way, becoming increasingly bitter and ruthless.

For the next century while building his criminal empire, Zu would steal the life essences of his blood relatives, including those from numerous offspring he fathered in order to preserve his longevity. Zu would lose possession of the Eyes but created the Elixir Vitae to prolong his longevity. Over time, Zu would use many aliases for himself and the Society, eventually choosing the name "Dr. Fu Manchu" and renaming the Society as the Si-Fan.

Zheng Zu discovered the existence of Ta-Lo and planned to steal the Five Sets of Heavenly Weapons to bolster the Five Weapons Society. Upon arriving at Qilin Island, the gateway between Earth and Ta-Lo, Zu was betrayed and left for dead by pirates under his service. Zu was rescued by Jiang Li of the Qilin Riders, a community of mortals from Ta-Lo tasked by the Chinese gods to protect the realm from outside threats. While being nursed back to health, Zu fell in love with Jiang Li. When Jiang Li's father, Chieftain Xin, discovered Zu's presence on the island, he ordered his daughter to execute the trespasser, but the two fled to the House of the Deadly Hand. When she discovered that Zu led a criminal organization, Jiang Li attempted to leave him but Zu promised to change his evil ways. The two married and had two children: son Shang-Chi and daughter Zheng Shi-Hua. Within the first few years into his marriage, Zheng Zu grew to genuinely love his family. Following an attack by Hydra against the House of the Deadly Hand, Zu became cold and distant towards his family, as he felt that his love for them made him weak, and resumed his plans to infiltrate Ta-Lo. Xin and Jiang Li confronted Zu in his personal tower, where they discovered he had constructed a makeshift portal to Ta-Lo. While Zu fought his wife and father-in-law, Shang-Chi happened upon the scene, just as the portal's connection to Ta-Lo became disconnected and Jiang Li was accidentally pushed through, sending her to the Negative Zone. Zu and Xin blamed each other for Jiang Li's presumed death and each tried convincing Shang-Chi to join them. Shang-Chi sided with his father and threw one of Zu's chemicals at Xin' face, blinding and leaving a scar across his right eye. Xin denounced Shang-Chi to be as evil as his father and fled. Zu subsequently placed a memory spell on Shang-Chi, making him forget the incident.

During their childhood, Shang-Chi and Shi-Hua accidentally discovered one of their father's secret laboratories in his Hunan retreat. As punishment, their father told Shang-Chi that he gave Shi-Hua a merciful death, explaining that the luxury of human bonds was weakness. Zu secretly sent Shi-Hua to the House of the Deadly Hammer in Russia. Shang-Chi would continue to be raised in isolation in his father's Hunan retreat; unbeknownst to Shang-Chi, the Hunan retreat was the House of the Deadly Hand, with Shang-Chi chosen to be its champion.

When Shang-Chi was 19, Zu dispatched Shang-Chi to London to kill Dr. Petrie, who he claimed to be a threat to world peace. Shang-Chi was successful in killing Petrie and was confronted by Denis Nayland Smith, who told Shang-Chi the truth about his father. After meeting with his mother in New York, who confirmed Smith's claims, Shang-Chi fought his way past Zu's bodyguards at his New York base, where he told his father that they were now enemies.

Under the alias of Wang Yu-Seng, Zu plans to kidnap Fah Lo Suee and Shang-Chi to jump-start the Elixir Vitae, which now needs the blood of his own children to return him to full vigor. With the help of the Death-Dealer, Zu captures Shang-Chi and holds him hostage to get his blood, only for Shang-Chi to escape. Zu brought Fah Luo Suee to Honan to have her blood as he was pursued by Shang-Chi. To combat Shang-Chi, Zu unleashes a clone of Shang-Chi, who is killed in batle with the real Shang-Chi. Zu attempts to lap up the clone's blood to save his life, but the fortress is destroyed as Shang-Chi leaves Zu to die. Following Zu's death, Zheng Bao Yu assumes control of the Hai-Dai.

Zheng Zu's bones are extracted from battle between the Secret Avengers and Shadow Council by a gang of disgruntled Society members who attempt to use the remains as part of a ritual to summon a younger version of Zheng Zu to take over the Society. Shang-Chi and his siblings attempt to stop the ritual, but Shang-Chi is accidentally sent back in time to the First Opium War, where he encounters younger versions of Zheng Zu, Zheng Yi, and that era's Deadly Warriors. As a younger man, Zu is shown to be heroic and amiable and befriends Shang-Chi. Zheng Zu and Shang-Chi work together to apprehend a corrupt Constable and part on good terms as Shang-Chi is transported back to the present; Zu remains oblivious to their familial relationship. Shang-Chi and his siblings bury Zu's remains, honoring the man he once was.

== Powers and abilities ==
Zheng Zu is a polymath genius in every field of knowledge. He is a skilled medical practitioner and surgeon and has cultivated diseases and viruses to use against his enemies. He has also mastered unarmed combat, disguise (and can speak in foreign languges without discernible accent), and hypnosis using his gaze. An ancient sorcerer, he is a master in the mystic arts and has discovered the means to immortality.

== Other versions ==
=== Earth-79816 ===
Shang-Chi believes that his Zheng Zu is a benefactor, he is shown to be loyal to Zheng Zu and the Five Weapons Society.

=== Secret Wars (2015) ===
In Secret Wars, Zheng Zu is the long-reigning emperor of the wuxia-inspired K'un-Lun region of Battleworld. In this continuity, his likeness and abilities are based on the Mandarin, and he is known as the Master of The Ten Rings, a martial arts school that uses mystical powers and techniques based on the powers of the Mandarin's 10 rings from the mainstream continuity. He is also the father of Shang-Chi, who is wanted for the murder of Lord Tuan, the master of the Iron Fist school, the main rival of the Ten Rings school. It is later revealed Zu sent his assassin, Red Sai of the Red Hand school, to assassinate Tuan, but she ultimately failed. To spare his lover and her students from the Emperor's wrath, Shang-Chi killed Tuan; Zu had his son implicated and exiled for the murder to cover up his own involvement. Representing the Ten Rings school, Emperor Zu hosts a tournament held every 13 years to decide who the next ruler of K'un-Lun should be, a position he has won for 100 years. When Shang-Chi returns from his exile to represent his own school, the Lowest Caste, Zu allows him to participate, but alters the rules so that Shang-Chi would have to defeat every representative before facing him in the Thirteen Chambers. During their fight, Zu attempts to kill his son with the Spectral Touch technique, only for the move to pass through him, due to Shang-Chi having learned how to become intangible. Shang-Chi proceeds to use nine of the 10 techniques against his father and ultimately defeats him with the Gorgon's Eye, which turns him to stone. With Zu's defeat, Shang-Chi becomes the new emperor of K'un-Lun.

== In other media ==
=== Role-playing games ===
Fu Manchu appears in the adventures Night Moves and Night Live for the role-playing game Marvel Super Heroes.

Shang-Chi's profile in the Marvel Multiverse Role-Playing Game mentions Zheng Zu and the Five Weapons Society.

=== Film ===
Tony Leung Chiu-wai portrays Xu Wenwu in the live-action Marvel Cinematic Universe film Shang-Chi and the Legend of the Ten Rings (2021). A composite character of Fu Manchu and the Mandarin, the character has been previously referenced in the Iron Man trilogy and the short film All Hail the King.

=== Board games ===
In the Secret Wars Volume 2 for Legendary: A Marvel Deck Building Game, there is an adaptation of Battleworld version of Zheng Zu as Emperor of K'un-Lun and the Ten Rings school, the emperor's name is spelled Zheng Zhu.
