= The Blood of Fu Manchu =

1968 film by Jesús Franco

- Theatrical release poster
- Directed by: Jesús Franco
- Screenplay by: Peter Welbeck; Manfred R. Köhler; Jesús Franco
- Based on: Fu Manchu by Sax Rohmer
- Produced by: Harry Alan Towers
- Starring: Christopher Lee; Tsai Chin; Maria Rohm; Howard Marion-Crawford; Richard Greene; Shirley Eaton
- Cinematography: Manuel Merino
- Edited by: Allan Morrison
- Production companies: Ada Films; Terra-Filmkunst; Udastex Films
- Distributed by: Anglo-Amalgamated (United Kingdom); Commonwealth United Entertainment (United States); CEA Distribución (Madrid)
- Release dates: 30 August 1968 (London); 23 March 1969 (United Kingdom); 24 September 1969 (Detroit); 2 March 1970 (Seville)
- Running time: 94 minutes
- Countries: United States; West Germany; Spain
- Language: English

The Blood of Fu Manchu (German: Der Todeskuss des Dr. Fu Man Chu, lit. 'The Death-Kiss of Dr. Fu Manchu', Spanish: Fu-Manchú y el beso de la muerte), also known as Kiss of Death, Kiss and Kill (U.S. title) and Against All Odds (original U.S. video title), is a 1968 British-German-Spanish-US adventure crime film directed by Jesús Franco, based on the fictional Asian villain Dr. Fu Manchu created by Sax Rohmer. It was the fourth film in a series, and was preceded by The Vengeance of Fu Manchu. The Castle of Fu Manchu followed in 1969.

It was produced by Harry Alan Towers for Udastex Films. It stars Christopher Lee as Dr. Fu Manchu, Richard Greene as Scotland Yard detective Nayland Smith, and Howard Marion-Crawford as Dr. Petrie. The film was filmed in Spain and Brazil. Shirley Eaton appears in a scene for which she claimed she was never paid. Apparently, director Jesús Franco inserted some stock footage of her from one of her earlier films, The Girl from Rio (1968), without telling her. She only found out years later that she had been in a Fu Manchu film.

== Plot ==
In his remote jungle hideout, the evil Dr. Fu Manchu, with his sadistic daughter Lin Tang, has discovered a deadly venom in a "lost city" in the Amazonian jungle that affects only men. Women can become carriers of the "kiss of death" by being bitten by venomous snakes. The venom causes blindness and is ultimately followed six weeks later by death. Using mind control, he aims six women at Nayland Smith and other key people with political influence. This prevents them from interfering with his own ambitions: to prepare millions of "doses" and spread them around the world's major cities and capitals in a plan to gain world domination.

== Cast ==
Credits adapted from the booklet of the Powerhouse Films Blu-ray boxset The Fu Manchu Cycle: 1965-1969.

- Christopher Lee as Fu Manchu
- Tsai Chin as Lin Tang
- Maria Rohm as Ursula Wagner
- Richard Greene as Nayland Smith
- Howard Marion-Crawford as Dr. Petrie
- Frances Khan as Carmen
- Isaura de Oliveira as Yuma
- Shirley Eaton as Black Widow
- Götz George as Carl Jansen
- Ricardo Palacios as Sancho Lopez
- Loni von Friedl as Celeste

Uncredited:

- Marcelo Arroita-Jáuregui as the Governor
- Olívia Pineschi as Fu's girl
- Vicente Roca as Governor's secretary
- Francesca Tu as Lotus

== Production ==
In 1965, the first of many adaptations of the works of Sax Rohmer were adapted to film by producer Harry Alan Towers. The first was The Face of Fu Manchu (1965) by director Don Sharp. The film had actor Christopher Lee begin a run of five performances as the villainous mastermind Fu Manchu.

In 1967, director Jesús Franco met producer Harry Alan Towers. The two made nine feature films together during a two-and-a-half-year period. These included three adaptations of works of Rohmer, The Blood of Fu Manchu, The Girl from Rio (1969) and The Castle of Fu Manchu (1970).

Filming began on 30 November 1967 and lasted approximately three weeks.

Various prints list different credited crew members. English and German prints both credit Alan Morrison as the film's editor while German prints also add Waltraut Lindenau as an editor. Spanish prints credit Angel Serrano. On the English prints, the music is credited to Daniel White while the Spanish print credits German composer Gert Wilden.

== Release ==
The Blood of Fu Manchu was released first in central London on 30 August 1968. This was followed by a more general release in the United Kingdom on 23 March 1969.

It was screened in Detroit on 24 September 1969. The first known release in Spain was in Seville on 2 March 1970, followed by screenings on 16 March 1970 in Barcelona and in Madrid on 1 February 1971.

== Critical reception ==
Writing in DVD Talk, film critic Glenn Erickson described the film as "a watchable action film of no great distinction [and] the only appeal comes from some impressive Brazilian locations and an okay cast." He added that the screenplay "is a dawdling snooze [that] is seriously lacking in humor," and that the movie "is thoroughly ruined by Jess Franco's non-direction."
