= Howard Marion-Crawford =

English actor (1914–1969)

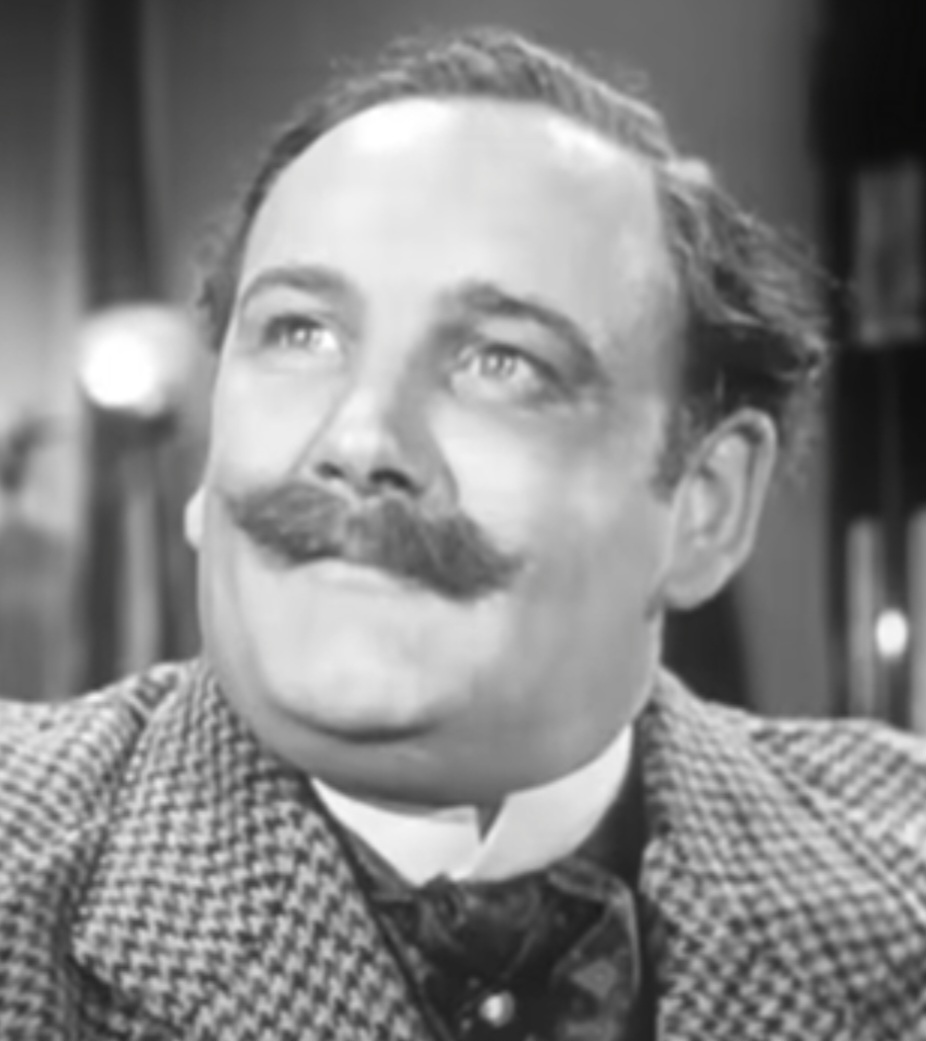
- Crawford in an episode of Sherlock Holmes (1954)
- Born: Howard Francis Marion-Crawford; 17 January 1914; London, England
- Died: 24 November 1969 (aged 55); Chelsea, London, England
- Years active: 1935–1969
- Spouse(s): Jeanne Scott-Gunn (div.); Mary Wimbush (1946–1954)
- Children: 2

Howard Marion-Crawford (17 January 1914 – 24 November 1969), was an English character actor, best known for his portrayal of Dr. Watson in the 1954 television series, Sherlock Holmes.

In 1948, Marion-Crawford had played Holmes in a radio adaptation of "The Adventure of the Speckled Band", making him one of the few actors to portray both Holmes and Watson. He is also known for his portrayal of Dr. Petrie in a series of five low budget Dr. Fu Manchu films in the 1960s, and playing Paul Temple in the BBC Radio serialisations.

== Career ==
Howard Marion-Crawford was born 17 January 1914, the son of Nina Marion-Crawford and Harold F. Marion-Crawford, an officer of the Irish Guards who died on 16 April 1915 during the First World War. After attending Clifton College, Crawford attended RADA and began a career in radio. His first film appearance was in Brown on Resolution (1935). During the Second World War he enlisted in the Irish Guards, his father's old regiment, but soon suffered a major injury to one of his legs that caused him to be invalided out of the service. After he recovered, he enlisted in the Royal Air Force, where he became a navigator, and rose to the rank of sergeant.

He resumed his acting career in both film in The Rake's Progress (1945) and was a regular broadcaster in BBC Radio Drama including playing the fictional detective Paul Temple in several series by Francis Durbridge. Among his film appearances are the character of Cranford in The Man in the White Suit (1951) and a British medical officer in Lawrence of Arabia (1962). One of his last roles was as another military officer, Sir George Brown, in Tony Richardson's The Charge of the Light Brigade (1968).

He often played "blusterers", "old duffers" and upper class military types, appearing as guest performer in television programmes like The Avengers, The Saint, and three roles with Patrick McGoohan in the television series Danger Man: the 1964 episodes "No Marks for Servility" and "Yesterday's Enemies" and the 1965 episode "English Lady Takes Lodgers". In 1956, he starred in "Fallstaff's Fur Coat" on Adventure Theater.

== Personal life ==
Marion-Crawford was married four times. Early in the Second World War, he was married to Jeanne Scott-Gunn, with whom he had a son, Harold Francis Marion-Crawford. In 1946, he married the actress Mary Wimbush, with whom he had another son, Charles.

Plagued by ill health later in life, he died from a mixture of alcohol and sleeping pills in 1969. An inquest recorded accidental death, his doctor stating that "in moments of strife he would go on a drinking bout lasting twenty-four to forty-eight hours".

== Selected filmography ==
- Me and Marlborough (1935) - Minor Role (uncredited)
- The Guv'nor (1935) - Undetermined Role (uncredited)
- Brown on Resolution (1935) - Max
- Music Hath Charms (1935) - (uncredited)
- Secret Agent (1936) - Karl - Lilli's Fiancé (uncredited)
- 13 Men and a Gun (1938) - Kramer
- The Spy in Black (1939) - German Officer in Kieler Hof Hotel (uncredited)
- Night Train to Munich (1940) - SS Officer Checking Passes (uncredited)
- Freedom Radio (1941) - Kummer
- The Rake's Progress (1945) - Coldstream Guardsman (uncredited)
- The Phantom Shot (1947) - Sgt. Clapper
- Man on the Run (1949) - 1st Paratrooper
- The Hasty Heart (1949) - Tommy
- Stage Fright (1950) - 1st Chauffeur (uncredited)
- Mr Drake's Duck (1951) - Maj. Travers
- The Man in the White Suit (1951) - Cranford
- His Excellency (1952) - Tea Shop Proprietor
- London's Country (1952) - Narrator (British Transport Films), ref.no.:2016/1859
- Where's Charley? (1953) - Sir Francis Chesney
- Top of the Form (1953) - Dickson
- Knights of the Round Table (1953) - Simon (uncredited)
- Don't Blame the Stork (1954) - Fluffy Faversham
- West of Zanzibar (1954) - Wood
- The Rainbow Jacket (1954) - Travers
- Five Days (1954) - Cyrus McGowan
- Elizabethan Express (1954) - joint Narrator, with Alan Wheatley, of British Transport Films short
- Othello (1956) - Othello (English version, voice)
- Reach for the Sky (1956) - Woody Woodhall
- War and Peace (1956) - Prince Bolkonsky (voice, uncredited)
- The Silken Affair (1956) - Baggott
- The Man in the Sky (1957) - Ingrams
- Ill Met by Moonlight (1957) - British Port Officer (uncredited)
- Don Quixote (1957) - Sancho Panza (English version, voice, uncredited)
- The Birthday Present (1957) - George Bates
- The Silent Enemy (1958) - Wing Commander
- Gideon's Day (1958) - The Chief
- Next to No Time (1958) - Hobbs
- Virgin Island (US: Our Virgin Island, 1958) - Prescott
- Nowhere to Go (US: Our Virgin Island, 1958) - Mack Cameron (uncredited)
- Model for Murder (1959) - Inspector Duncan
- Life in Danger (1959) - Major Peters
- North West Frontier (1959) - Peter's Contact at Kalapur Station (uncredited)
- Foxhole in Cairo (1960) - British Major
- Carry On Regardless (1961) - Wine-Tasting Organiser
- The Longest Day (1962) - Glider Doctor (uncredited)
- Lawrence of Arabia (1962) - Medical Officer
- Tamahine (1963) - Major Spruce
- Man in the Middle (1963) - Maj. Poole
- The Face of Fu Manchu (1965) - Doctor Petrie
- Secrets of a Windmill Girl (1966) - Richard - Producer
- The Brides of Fu Manchu (1966) - Doctor Petrie
- The Vengeance of Fu Manchu (1967) - Doctor Petrie
- Smashing Time (1967) - Hall Porter (uncredited)
- The Charge of the Light Brigade (1968) - Lt. Gen. Sir George Brown
- The Blood of Fu Manchu (1968) - Doctor Petrie
- The Castle of Fu Manchu (1969) - Doctor Petrie
- Avalanche (1969) - (final film role)
