= Ric Young =

Malaysian actor

- 容榮華
- Born: Wing-Wah Yung; 1944 (age 81–82); Kuala Lumpur, Japanese Malaya (now Malaysia)
- Other name: Eric Young
- Education: Royal Academy of Dramatic Art
- Occupation: Actor

Chinese name
- Traditional Chinese: 里克揚
- Simplified Chinese: 里克扬
Transcriptions
Standard Mandarin
- Hanyu Pinyin: Lǐ Kè Yáng

Birth name
- Traditional Chinese: 容榮華
- Simplified Chinese: 容榮華
Transcriptions
Standard Mandarin
- Hanyu Pinyin: Róng Róng-huá

Eric Wing Wah Yung (Chinese: 容榮華; pinyin: Róng Rónghuá born 1944), better known as Ric Young, is a Malaysian retired actor. He appeared in over 100 films and television programmes from his debut in 1958, mainly in the United Kingdom and later the United States.

Young was a series regular on spy action television series Alias (2001–04), playing Dr. Zhang Lee. He appeared in such films as You Only Live Twice (1967), Indiana Jones and the Temple of Doom (1984), The Last Emperor (1987), Dragon: The Bruce Lee Story (1993), Nixon (1995), Seven Years in Tibet (1997), The Transporter (2002), and American Gangster (2007).

== Early life ==
A Malaysian Chinese, Young was born Wing-Wah Yung (容榮華) in Kuala Lumpur in 1944. He got his start taking part in radio sketches at the age of 12. He trained as an actor at the Royal Academy of Dramatic Art, under a King George VI Coronation Scholarship. He then moved to Los Angeles to study method acting under Shelley Winters and Lee Strasberg.

== Career ==
=== Actor ===
When he moved to the UK in 1958, he was introduced to US theater and film producer Mike Todd, landing him a small part in the film The Inn of the Sixth Happiness. He moved to Italy for five months, where he played roles in movies and television. On his return to the UK, he performed under the name Eric Young, appearing on TV shows in the 1960s and 1970s such as The Saint, The Avengers, Blake's 7, The Tomorrow People, Somerset Maugham Hour, The Champions, Danger Man, The Chinese Puzzle, Are You Being Served? and Room Service.

From 1958 to 1978, he was credited as Eric Young, which he later shortened to Ric Young.

Some of his best-known roles include: Kao Kan in Indiana Jones and the Temple of Doom, Bruce Lee's father in Dragon: The Bruce Lee Story (1993), Mao Zedong in Nixon (1995), General Chang Jing Wu in Seven Years in Tibet (1997), Mr. Kwai in The Transporter (2002) and Henry Lee in The Corruptor (1999). He is one of the few individuals who performed in both the original versions of the TV series The Saint (in 1964), Hawaii Five-O (in 1976) and their reboots in Return of the Saint (in 1978) and Hawaii Five-O (in 2010).

Young teaches acting alongside his other projects.

=== Producer ===
Young has produced two projects, Paranormal Whactivity and the short Oy Vey!.

== Filmography ==
=== Film ===
Year	Title	Role	Notes
1958	The Inn of the Sixth Happiness	Bit part	Uncredited
1958	Rascel marine	Japanese soldier	
1961	The Terror of the Tongs	Confucius	
1961	The Sinister Man	John Choto	
1962	Satan Never Sleeps	Junior Officer	Uncredited
1965	Lord Jim	Malay	
1965	The Face of Fu Manchu	Grand Lama	
1966	Invasion	The Lystrian	
1966	The Brides of Fu Manchu	Control Assistant	
1967	You Only Live Twice	Chinese Agent	Uncredited
1967	Pretty Polly	Lim Kee	
1969	The Chairman	Yin	
1974	Sex Play	Wang Lo	
1983	High Road to China	Kim Su Lee	
1984	Indiana Jones and the Temple of Doom	Kao Kan	
1984	Success Is the Best Revenge	Chinese Waiter	
1987	Ping Pong	Alan Wong	
1987	Dragon Chow	Xiao	
1987	The Last Emperor	Prison Interrogator	
1988	Keys to Freedom	Lieutenant Kwong	
1993	Cyborg 2	Bobby Lin	
1993	Dragon: The Bruce Lee Story	Lee Hoi-chuen	
1995	Nixon	Mao Zedong	
1997	Booty Call	Mr. Chiu	
1997	Seven Years in Tibet	General Chang Jing-wu	
1999	The Corruptor	Henry Lee	
2000	Chain of Command	Ken Fung	
2001	Kiss of the Dragon	'Mr. Big' Sung	
2002	Long Life, Happiness & Prosperity	Bing Lai	
2002	The Transporter	Mr. Kwai	
2004	Mickey	ESPN Reporter	
2007	American Gangster	Khun Sa	
2010	The 41-Year-Old Virgin Who Knocked Up Sarah Marshall and Felt Superbad About It	Kim Jong-il	
2012	Betrayal	Joey	
2012	Getting Back to Zero	Big Boss Man	

=== Television ===
Year	Title	Role	Episode
1959	The Voodoo Factor	The Malayan	The Malayan
1960	Somerset Maugham Hour	Kong	Flotsam and Jetsam
1960	The Odd Man	Chinese Waiter	Episode 3
1960	Danger Man	Ming	The Journey Ends Halfway
1960	Danger Man	Police Lieutenant	The Honeymooners
1961	Danger Man	Mr. Toy	The Actor
1961	The Avengers	Suchong	Kill The King
1961	Ghost Squad	Robert E. Lee	Hong Kong Story
1962	The River Flows East	Chinaman	2 episodes
1962	Man of the World	Chou	The Frontier
1963	Zero One	Jerry	Deadly Angels
1963	Ghost Squad	Barman	East of Mandalay
1963	Espionage	Captain Li	The Dragon Slayer
1964	The Saint	Lo Yung	Jeannine
1966	Out of the Unknown	Munder	The Eye
1968	The Champions	Ho Ling	The Beginning
1968	The Champions	Burmese Police Captain	The Gun-Runners
1969	Strange Report	Sung-Lee	Report 2641: Hostage – If You Won't Learn, Die!
1969	Doctor in the House	Chinese Student	Getting the Bird
1969	W. Somerset Maugham	Ong Chi Seng	The Letter
1970	W. Somerset Maugham	Oakley	The Door of Opportunity
1970	The Troubleshooters	Nivilak	Who Did You Say Inherits the Earth?
1972	Jason King	Airport Barman	Every Picture Tells a Story
1972	Doctor in Charge	First Interpreter	Yellow Fever
1972	The Onedin Line	Johnny Heave-Ho	Fetch and Carry
1972	The Onedin Line	Liu Chan	Race For Power
1974	Bless This House	Si Ann	The Bells Are Ringing
1974	The Tomorrow People	Lee Wan	The Doomsday Men
1974	ITV Playhouse	Mr. Yamada	Love Affair
1974	Microbes and Men	Shiga	The Search for the Magic Bullet
1974	The Chinese Puzzle	China	6 episodes
1975	Are You Being Served?	Mr. Kato	The Hand of Fate
1976	The XYY Man	Li Tshien	The Resolution & The Execution (2 episodes)
1976	Hawaii Five-O	Chinese Travel Agent	Nine Dragons
1977	Crown Court	Sherpa Solo Khombu	An Upward Fall
1978	Gangsters	Double Petal	Double Peril & Enter the White Devil (2 episodes)
1978	The Doombolt Chase	Statesman	Death Beacon
1978	Return of the Saint	Surinit	Assault Force
1978	The Upchat Connection	Tourist	Mystery Tour
1979	Room Service	Tin-Tin	6 episodes
1980	Blake's 7	Ginka	Children of Auron
1980	Spearhead	Sergeant Weng	The Macau Connection
1981	Tenko	Father Lim	2 episodes
1983	Reilly, Ace of Spies	Sergeant	Prelude to War
1984	The Brief	Mr. Sun	No Questions
1988	Noble House	Tsu-Yan	4 episodes
1989	Booker	Japanese Boss	High Rise
1991	Tatort	Chow	Die chinesische Methode
1995	Signs and Wonders	Father Mercy	4 episodes
1997–98	Night Man	Mr. Chang	3 episodes
2001–04	Alias	Dr. Zhang Lee	Recurring role
2005	Commander in Chief	Reporter	Pilot
2010	Hawaii Five-0	General Pak	Po'ipu
