= Fah Lo Suee =

Fictional character from Sax Rohmer novels

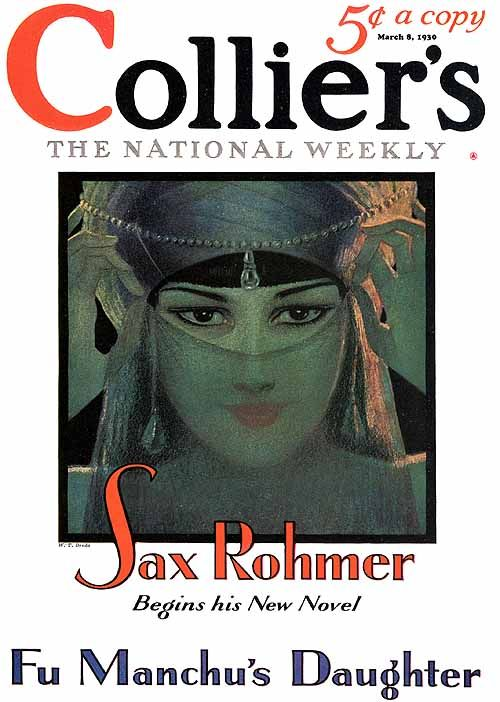
- First appearance: The Hand of Fu-Manchu (1917)
- Created by: Sax Rohmer
- Portrayed by: Anna May Wong; Myrna Loy; Gloria Franklin; Laurette Luez; Tsai Chin

In-universe information
- Full name: unknown
- Aliases: Lady of the Si-Fan; Koreani; Madame Ingomar; Queen Mamaloi; Mrs van Roorden
- Gender: Female
- Occupation: supervillain, assassin, crime boss, antiheroine
- Affiliation: Si-Fan
- Family: Fu Manchu (father)
- Nationality: Chinese Manchu

Fah Lo Suee (Chinese: 花露水; pinyin: Huā Lùshuǐ; Jyutping: faa1 lou6 seoi2) is a character who was introduced in the series of novels about Fu Manchu by the English author Sax Rohmer (1883–1959). She is the daughter of Fu Manchu and an unnamed Russian woman, sometimes shown as an ally, sometimes shown as a rival. The character featured in cinema and comic strips and comic books alongside her father, sometimes using another names, and she has also become an archetype of the Dragon Lady.

== History ==
The character of Fah Lo Suee was created in 1917 by Sax Rohmer as the Lady of the Si-Fan in the novel The Hand of Fu-Manchu (original UK title: The Si-Fan Mysteries). In the novel Daughter of Fu Manchu (1931), she is called Fah Lo Suee, a nickname meaning "Sweet Perfume". Fah Lo Suee, is a devious mastermind in her own right, frequently plotting to usurp her father's position in the Si-Fan and aiding his enemies both within and outside the organization. Her real name is unknown; Fah Lo Suee was a childhood term of endearment. She is introduced anonymously while still a teenager in the third book in the series and plays a larger role in several of the titles of the 1930s and 1940s. She is known for a time as Koreani after being brainwashed by her father, but her memory is later restored. Like her father, she takes on false identities, among them Madame Ingomar, Queen Mamaloi and Mrs van Roorden. She falls in love with her father's rival, Denis Nayland Smith. In cinema, the character was often played by Caucasian actresses such as Myrna Loy and Gloria Franklin in yellowface, as was the case with Fu Manchu himself and Charlie Chan. Two Asian actresses played Fu Manchu's daughter but with different names: Anna May Wong was Princess Ling Moy in Daughter of the Dragon (1931) and Tsai Chin was Lin Tang in the five films: The Face of Fu Manchu (1965), The Brides of Fu Manchu (1966). The Vengeance of Fu Manchu (1967), The Blood of Fu Manchu (1968) and The Castle of Fu Manchu (1969).

== In other media ==
=== Comics ===
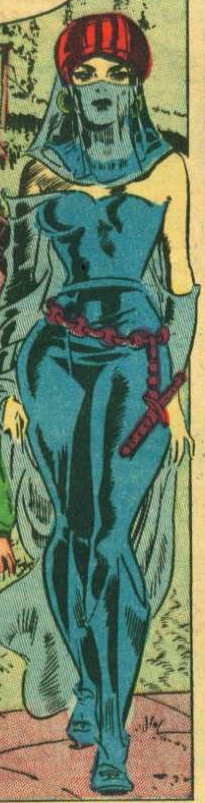
Fah lo Suee in The Mask Of Dr Fu Manchu (1951), art by Wally Wood

Fah lo Suee appears in Avon's one-shot The Mask of Dr. Fu Manchu in 1951 by Wally Wood. In the early 1970s, writer Steve Englehart and artist Jim Starlin approached Marvel Comics to adapt the television series Kung Fu into a comic book, as DC's parent company, Warner Communications, owned the rights to the series. DC Comics, however, was not interested in their pitch, believing the show's and the martial arts genre popularity would phase out quickly. The duo then approached Marvel Comics with the idea to create a kung fu-focused original comic. Editor-in-chief Roy Thomas approved, but only if they would include the Sax Rohmer's pulp villain Dr. Fu Manchu, as Marvel had previously acquired the comic book rights to the character. Englehart and Starlin developed Shang-Chi, a master of kung fu and a previously unknown son of Dr. Fu Manchu. At first, only a few characters were adapted from the Fu Manchu series, such as Dr. Petrie and Denis Nayland Smith, with whom Fah lo Suee has a romance in the novels. In Master of Kung Fu #26 (cover-dated March 1975), Doug Moench and Keith Pollard adapted Fah lo Suee for the series. She becomes an ally of Shang-Chi and MI-6. When Marvel's license with the Rohmer estate expired in 1983, Master of Kung Fu was cancelled. Fah lo Suee became the director of MI-6. Despite subsequent issues either mentioning characters from the novels cryptically or phasing them out entirely, Fah Lo Suee reappeared in Journey into Mystery #514–516, (1997-1998) leading a drug cartel in Hong Kong under the name Cursed Lotus. In 2010's Secret Avengers #6–10, writer Ed Brubaker officially sidestepped the entire issue in a storyline in which the Shadow Council resurrects a zombified version of Dr. Fu Manchu, only to discover that "Dr. Fu Manchu" was only an alias and that Shang-Chi's father was Zheng Zu, an ancient Chinese sorcerer who discovered the secret to immortality, and the Si-Fan is renamed as the Hai-Dai. Similarly, Fah Lo Suee was later renamed Zheng Bao Yu in 2013's The Fearless Defenders #8, written by Cullen Bunn, where she appears leading the Hai-Dai.

=== Films ===
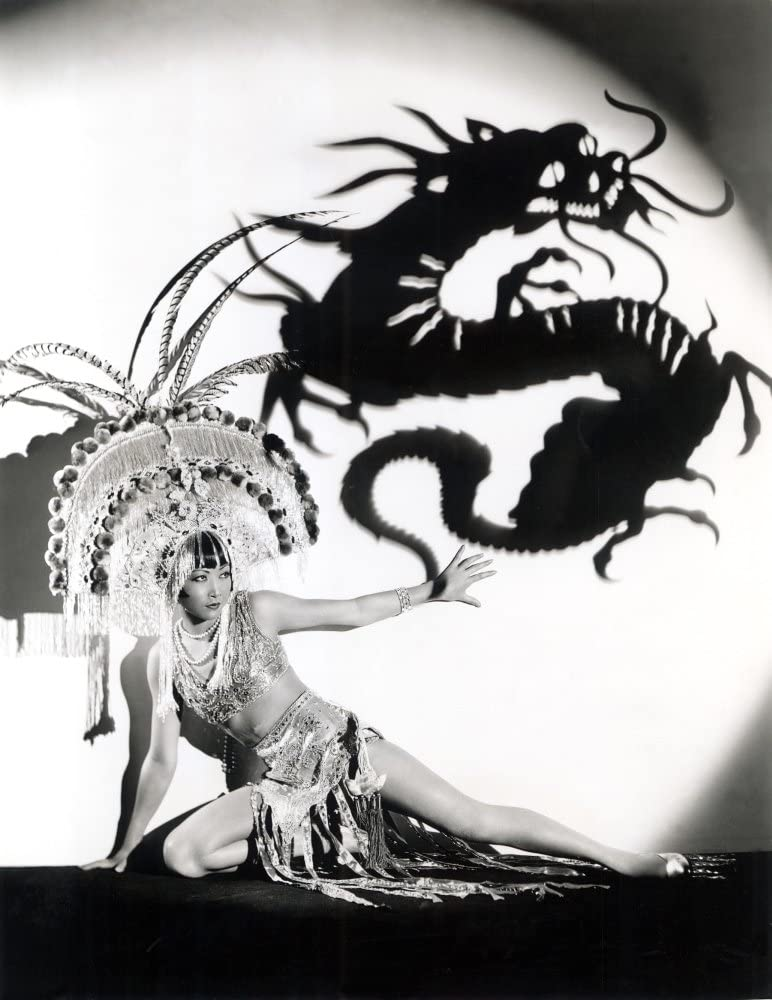
Anna May Wong as Princess Ling Moy

In films she has been portrayed by numerous actresses over the years. Her character is usually renamed in film adaptations because of difficulties with the pronunciation of her name.

- Anna May Wong played Princess Ling Moy in Daughter of the Dragon (1931).
- Myrna Loy portrayed the similarly named Fah Lo See in The Mask of Fu Manchu (1932).
- Gloria Franklin had the role of Fah Lo Suee in Drums of Fu Manchu (1940).
- Laurette Luez played Karamaneh in The Adventures of Dr. Fu Manchu (1956), but the character owed more to Fah Lo Suee than to Rohmer's depiction of Kâramanèh.
- Tsai Chin portrayed Dr Fu Manchu's daughter Lin Tang in the five Christopher Lee films of the 1960s: The Face of Fu Manchu (1965), The Brides of Fu Manchu (1966). The Vengeance of Fu Manchu (1967), The Blood of Fu Manchu (1968), and The Castle of Fu Manchu (1969).

In Shang-Chi and the Legend of the Ten Rings (2021), a character named Xu Xialing (portrayed by Meng'er Zhang) appears. She is partially based on Fah Lo Suee.

=== Role-playing games ===
Fah Lo Suee appears in the adventure Night Moves for the role-playing game Marvel Super Heroes.
