= Night Moves (adventure) =

Role-playing game adventure

- Cover art by Jeff Butler
- Publishers: TSR
- Systems: Marvel Super Heroes

Night Moves is a role-playing game adventure published by TSR in 1990 for the Marvel Super Heroes role-playing game.

== Contents ==
Night Moves is the second of three Marvel Super Heroes adventures in the Gang Wars trilogy that is set in San Francisco's Chinatown. The adventurers see a ghost that sends them by boat to investigate the theft of a crate of statues. The adventurers must also protect Chinatown from gangs, especially the Si Fan assassins and their henchman, the Constrictor, the Beetle and the Blizzard. While shutting down a network of drug dealers, the heroes also have a chance to run into the Silver Samurai. While widening the search, they encounter Thor, and assist him to locate two missing companions, who are being held by the Chemist and his Dreadnaughts. The heroes are themselves captured and witness the resurrection of the evil Fu Manchu. The heroes must attempt to prevent Fu Manchu from joining the Faces of Fear gang.

Although written as a sequel to the first adventure of the Gang Wars series, After Midnight, it can be run as a standalone adventure.

== Publication history ==
After acquiring the license to produce a role-playing game based on the Marvel Comics universe, TSR first published Marvel Super Heroes in 1984, and followed with many adventures. In 1990, TSR published the Gang Wars trilogy of adventures set in San Francisco. The second, MLA2 Night Moves, was written by Anthony Herring, with a cover by Jeff Butler, and was published by TSR, Inc. as a 64-page book, with a large color map, and an outer folder.

The other two adventures in the trilogy are MLA1 After Midnight and MLA3 Night Life.
