= The Castle of Fu Manchu =

1969 film

- German theatrical release poster
- Directed by: Jesús Franco
- Screenplay by: English version: Peter Welbeck; German/Spanish versions: Manfred Barthel
- Spanish dialogue by: Jaime Jesús Balcázar
- Based on: Fu Manchu by Sax Rohmer
- Produced by: Harry Alan Towers; Jaime Jesús Balcázar
- Starring: Christopher Lee; Tsai Chin; Maria Perschy; Howard Marion-Crawford; Richard Greene
- Cinematography: Manuel Merino
- Edited by: John Colville
- Music by: Charles Camilleri; Malcomb Shelby
- Production companies: Balcázar Producciones Cinematográficas; Terra-Filmkunst; Italian International Films; Towers of London (Films)
- Distributed by: MGM-EMI Distributors (UK); Constantin Film (West Germany); Dolores Sostre Sobre (Spain)
- Release dates: 30 May 1969 (West Germany); 24 September 1970 (Kingston, Jamaica); December 1970 (UK); 18 September 1972 (Barcelona)
- Running time: 92 minutes
- Countries: United Kingdom; West Germany; Spain; Italy; Liechtenstein
- Language: English

The Castle of Fu Manchu (German: Die Folterkammer des Dr. Fu Man Chu, lit. 'The Torture Chamber of Dr. Fu Manchu', Spanish: El castillo de Fu-Manchu), released in 1969, is the fifth and final Dr. Fu Manchu film with Christopher Lee portraying the title character. Directed by Jesús Franco, is an English-language co-production among various European countries like Italy, Spain, and West Germany.

The film is also known as Assignment Istanbul.

== Plot ==
Supercriminal Dr. Fu Manchu plots to freeze the world's oceans with a diabolical new device. With his beautiful but evil daughter, Lin Tang, his army of dacoits, and the help of the local crime organization led by Omar Pasha (whom Dr. Fu Manchu double-crosses), Dr. Fu Manchu takes over the governor's castle in Istanbul, which has a massive opium reserve, to control the largest opium port in Anatolia, since the drug is an important ingredient for the fuel for his machine. Dr. Fu Manchu needs the help of an intelligent scientist with an ailing heart whom he has imprisoned. In order to keep the scientist alive, he kidnaps a doctor and his wife to give the scientist a heart transplant from one of his obedient servants. Opposing him from Britain's branch of Interpol are his nemeses, Nayland Smith and Dr. Petrie.

== Cast ==
- Christopher Lee as Fu Manchu
- Tsai Chin as Lin Tang
- Maria Perschy as Dr. Ingrid Koch
- Richard Greene as Nayland Smith
- Howard Marion-Crawford as Dr. Petrie
- Günther Stoll as Dr. Curt Kessler
- Rosalba Neri as Lisa
- José Manuel Martín as Omar Pasha
- Werner Aprelat as Melnik

Uncredited:

- Mike Brendel as Pasha's Gunman
- Jesús Franco as Inspector Hamid
- Herbert Fux as Governor
- Osvaldo Genazzani as Sir Robert
- Burt Kwouk as Feng (archive footage from The Brides of Fu Manchu)
- Gustavo Re as Professor Heracles
- Gene Reyes as Hamid's Aide
- Moisés Augusto Rocha as Fu's Henchman

== Production ==
The film was shot in Istanbul and Barcelona.

== Release ==
The Castle of Fu Manchu was released on May 30, 1969, in West Germany and on September 24, 1970, in Kingston, Jamaica. This was followed by screenings in the United Kingdom in December 1970, Barcelona on September 18, 1972, and Madrid on May 28, 1973, and Seville on July 6, 1974.

Blue Underground released the film on DVD under The Christopher Lee Collection in 2003.

== Reception ==
Film critic Glenn Erickson described the film in DVD Talk as having a "static screenplay" with "decor and detail [that] so abounds that the adequate period feel of the previous films has totally disappeared." It is also noted that "Fu double-crosses everyone he meets, and is so predictably ruthless, it's a wonder why anyone bothers to pay any attention to him," and "there's no sex this time around, and precious little real action, so perhaps it's a compliment to say that the show is more watchable than it has any right to expect."

Tom Johnson author of The Christopher Lee Filmography (2004), said that Lee and Tsai Chin offer some dignified performances, The Castle of Fu Manchu was generally "strictly shoddy" and "perhaps the most badly written and contrived movie Christopher Lee has ever made."

== In popular culture ==
In 1992, The Castle of Fu Manchu was featured in Mystery Science Theater 3000 (Season 3, Episode 23). Towards the end, Joel Robinson comments that Roger Ebert liked the movie; however, in 1993 Ebert stated he had "never seen it."

== See also ==
- A Night to Remember - Titanic sinking scene used for this movie
- Campbell's Kingdom - The dam bursting scene is footage taken from this Dirk Bogarde film. Bogarde and Stanley Baker can be recognized wearing the green checked shirt and the red shirt, respectively.
