= Denis Nayland Smith =

- First appearance: The Zayat Kiss (1912)
- Created by: Sax Rohmer
- Portrayed by: Fred Paul; O. P. Heggie; Lewis Stone; William Royle; Cedric Hardwicke; Lester Matthews; Nigel Green; Douglas Wilmer; Richard Greene; Peter Sellers
- Voiced by: Fred Paul; Hanley Stafford

In-universe information
- Gender: Male
- Occupation: police commissioner
- Affiliation: Indian Imperial Police
- Nationality: British

Denis Nayland Smith is a character created by English author Sax Rohmer as protagonist in a series of novels featuring the villain Fu Manchu.

== History ==
The character of Denis Nayland Smith was created in 1912 by Sax Rohmer, in the short story The Zayat Kiss, narrated by his friend Dr. Petrie. The short story was included in the fix-up novel The Mystery of Dr. Fu-Manchu. In the first three books, Smith serves in the Indian Imperial Police as a police commissioner in Burma who has been granted a roving commission, allowing him to exercise authority over any official group who can help him in his mission.

When Rohmer revived the series in 1931, Smith, who has been knighted for his efforts to defeat Fu Manchu, is an ex-Assistant Commissioner of Scotland Yard.

Nayland Smith had an affair with his rival's daughter, Fah Lo Suee.

== In other media ==
=== Comics ===
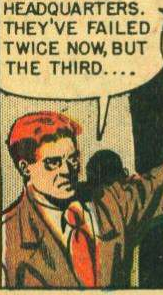
Denis Nayland Smith in The Mask of Dr. Fu Manchu (1951), art by Wally Wood.

Nayland Smith was first brought to newspaper comic strips in a black and white daily comic strip Fu Manchu drawn by Leo O'Mealia (1884–1960) that ran from 1931 to 1933. The strips were adaptations of the first two Dr. Fu Manchu novels and part of the third. Nayland Smith made his first comic book appearance in Detective Comics #17 and continued, as one feature among many in the anthology series, until #28. These were reprints of the earlier Leo O'Mealia strips. In 1943, the serial Drums of Fu Manchu was adapted by Spanish comic artist José Grau Hernández in 1943. Nayland Smith appears in Avon's one-shot The Mask of Dr. Fu Manchu in 1951 by Wally Wood.

In the early 1970s, writer Steve Englehart and artist Jim Starlin approached DC Comics to adapt the television series Kung Fu into a comic book, as DC's parent company, Warner Communications, owned the rights to the series. DC Comics, however, was not interested in their pitch, believing the show's and the martial arts genre popularity would phase out quickly. The duo then approached Marvel Comics with the idea to create a kung fu-focused original comic. Editor-in-chief Roy Thomas agreed, but only if they would include the Sax Rohmer's pulp villain Dr. Fu Manchu, as Marvel had previously acquired the comic book rights to the character. Englehart and Starlin developed Shang-Chi, a master of kung fu and a previously unknown son of Dr. Fu Manchu. In Master of Kung Fu #17 (cover-dated April 1974), Steve Englehart and Jim Starlin adapted the character for the series. After Marvel's license with the Rohmer estate expired, Master of Kung Fu was cancelled in 1983, Smith and Petrie have not appeared in any Marvel properties since the end of the Master of Kung Fu series in 1983.

Sir Denis Nayland Smith and Petrie fought for forty years against Fu Manchu but were ageing. Then Fu Manchu ordered his son Shang-Chi, who believed his father was a noble man dedicated to world peace, to kill Petrie. Shang-Chi obeyed the order though he only killed a replicant. This led Shang-Chi to encounter Nayland Smith who told him the truth about his father. Petrie was found alive and together with Nayland Smith, Shang-Chi, Black Jack Tarr an ex soldier and Clive Reston, a smooth talker, the war continued.

Sir Denis Nayland Smith is one of the few characters from the Marvel Universe to have appeared in an Action Force story. Normally the two are treated as completely separate continuities.

- Sir Denis Nayland Smith's appearance in "Meditations in Red" served to introduce Shang-Chi in preparation for a reprint of his adventures from Master of Kung Fu volume 1 #29 to #31 in Action Force issue #18 to issue #29.
- Sir Denis Nayland Smith was one of a number of characters originally created for the Fu Manchu series of novels by Sax Rohmer. The comic rights to the novels were purchased by Marvel in the 1970s who combined them with their original character of Shang-Chi.

=== Films ===
- Fred Paul in The Mystery of Dr Fu-Manchu (1923) and The Further Mysteries of Dr Fu-Manchu (1924).
- O. P. Heggie in The Mysterious Dr. Fu Manchu (1929) and The Return of Dr. Fu Manchu (1930)
- Lewis Stone in The Mask of Fu Manchu (1932)
- William Royle in Drums of Fu Manchu (1940)
- Nigel Green in The Face of Fu Manchu (1965)
- Douglas Wilmer in The Brides of Fu Manchu (1966) and The Vengeance of Fu Manchu (1967)
- Richard Greene in The Blood of Fu Manchu (1968) and The Castle of Fu Manchu (1969)
- Peter Sellers portrayed both Smith and Fu Manchu in The Fiendish Plot of Dr. Fu Manchu (1980)

=== Television ===
- Cedric Hardwicke in Fu Manchu: The Zayat Kiss (1952)
- Lester Matthews in The Adventures of Dr. Fu Manchu (1956) television series

=== Radio ===
- Hanley Stafford in The Shadow of Fu Manchu (1939–1940).
