= Fearless Defenders =

Marvel comic book series

- Cover of The Fearless Defenders #1 (February 2013). Art by Mark Brooks.

Publication information
- Publisher: Marvel Comics
- Schedule: Monthly
- Format: Ongoing series
- Genre: Superhero
- Publication date: February – December 2013
- No. of issues: 13
- Main character(s): Valkyrior: Valkyrie; Misty Knight; Annabelle Riggs; Danielle Moonstar; Warrior Woman; Clea

Creative team
- Created by: Cullen Bunn; Will Sliney
- Written by: Cullen Bunn
- Artist(s): Will Sliney; Phil Jimenez; Stephanie Hans

The Fearless Defenders was an ongoing comic book series published by Marvel Comics that debuted in February 2013 as part of the company's Marvel NOW! initiative. The series, written by Cullen Bunn with artwork by Will Sliney, centered on the Valkyrior, a team of female superheroes led by Valkyrie and Misty Knight. Despite favorable reviews from critics, the series ended in December 2013 after thirteen issues due to poor sales.

== Publication history ==
In May 2012, writer Cullen Bunn stated that the concept of the series came to him while scripting the fifth or sixth issue of Fear Itself: The Fearless, which also starred Valkyrie. Bunn said he was campaigning for the book following the conclusion of Fear Itself: The Fearless, when an editor pitched the idea of doing it as a Defenders title. However Bunn explained that beyond the name there is "quite little connection" to the Defenders. In November 2012, Marvel Comics teased the announcement of The Fearless Defenders by releasing an image of the word "Fearless" with the creative team of Bunn and artist Will Sliney. A week later, Marvel made the full announcement. Bunn said, "The basic idea of the book is that Valkyrie is choosing a new team of Valkyrior, and she's been asked to choose all these women from the heroes of Midgard (Earth), instead of from Asgard". Bunn also said that Misty Knight co-stars in the series, "They're our co-leads, and the rest of the team will build around them. I think it'll be interesting to see how the two of them see things differently. You've got Misty, who's a very street-level character. And you've got Valkyrie, who's a goddess". Danielle Moonstar was revealed as the third member of team. Bunn said, "She has such a connection to the Valkyrie. She was on the top of my list when I started putting together who I thought would be the core roster".

Hippolyta, who died in The Incredible Hercules #121 (September 2008), returned in issue #2 under the moniker "Warrior Woman" and received an updated look and power set. Editor Ellie Pyle, who worked with artist Phil Jimenez on Hippolyta's design, said, "He [Phil Jimenez] wanted to use a lot of the Greek imagery. We wanted to update her look a little bit. Phil has a background in fashion, so he wanted to bring a bit of that modern aesthetic to her look."

In April 2013, Marvel announced that the series would tie into the Age of Ultron crossover event with issue #4AU (May 2013). In the issue, it is revealed that the series villain, Caroline Le Fey is the daughter of Morgan le Fey and Doctor Doom. Bunn said, "I always knew Caroline would be a descendent of Morgan, but I didn't decide that she would actually be her daughter until a little later down the line. My original plan was to drop clues to her heritage over time... Then Age of Ultron happened, and that changed everything! I wanted the tie-in issue to have impact on the main series, and revealing Caroline's origins seemed to fit the bill." Bunn also said he wrote two versions of Hippolyta's confrontation with her father Ares; the first was darker and less action oriented but decided to go with the second as it better reflected the spirit of the series.

The first story arc of The Fearless Defenders came to a close with issue #6 in July 2013. Bunn said, "The first arc has definitely been very Asgardian. That's just the nature of doing a story about Valkyrie. As we go into the next arc, I take the opportunity to show that there are stories for this team in any number of environments... Issues #7-#12, while they tell a complete story, we're going to do a series of done-in-one stories with those issues. Each of those issues will be pretty good jumping-on points for anybody." Issue #6 also featured the death of Annabelle Riggs, who Newsarama called "one of Marvel's few prominent lesbian characters", which drew a strong reaction from fans. In response Bunn wrote, "the fact that she was a lesbian didn’t even enter the equation for me, except that it was part of what made her who she was — just one part of many" with Pyle adding, "I feel very strongly that her sacrifice was very true to everything we love about her. As to whether the fact that she is a lesbian should have kept us from telling a story in which she died… in this particular case, not having this specific character sacrifice herself would have made for a story in which we were less emotionally invested."

In June 2013, Marvel announced The Fearless Defenders #10 (October 2013) would tie into the Infinity crossover event. Bunn said, "The main Infinity crossover will be in Fearless Defenders #10. They're here on Earth facing the threat of Thanos’ forces trying to raze the city of New York... At the same time though, not only are they going to be dealing with Thanos’ forces, they're going to be dealing with the ever-present Caroline Le Fay who's going to be up to no good during this event and it's all going to center around this new character who'll be surfacing in the issue, a new super-powered individual." Bunn also revealed that The Fearless Defenders #10 will be a dance issue explaining, "I’m not sure how many dance comic books are out there anyway, but definitely not dance super hero comics. I’ve tried to do different things with the book from the beginning and this issue will definitely live up to that ideal."

In October 2013, Bunn stated on Tumblr that the series will end with issue #12 (December 2013). Sales of the series steadily declined since its debut in February 2013 and reached its lowest point in September, selling 15,840 units. In contrast the first issue sold 53,688 units. Bunn said, "We’ll try to wrap up as many story elements as we can", but admitted, "I typically plan for a much longer story. I should know better, because there are no guarantees that the story will make it that long. But I just can’t help it when I’m excited about a book."

== Plot ==
In the North Atlantic Ocean, Misty Knight stops some mercenaries from smuggling ancient Asgardian artifacts, though they manage to get away with their primary target. Misty takes the recovered artifacts to Annabelle Riggs, who is excavating a Viking burial site and inadvertently awakens the dead Vikings with one of the artifacts. Misty battles the Vikings and is soon joined by Valkyrie, who senses the commotion. When the fight is over, Valkyrie agrees to take Annabelle and Misty to Asgardia, to seek council on the matter.

The mercenaries kidnap Danielle Moonstar and bring her to Caroline le Fey, who wants to become a valkyrie like Dani. In Asgardia, the All-Mother explains to Valkyrie, Misty and Annabelle that the dead Vikings signal the return of the Doommaidens; corrupted valkyries, who come to fill the void left by Valkyrie's inability to assemble a new Valkyrior. Hela, aware of the Doommaidens' return, brings Hippolyta from the Underworld to help set things right.

The All-Mother teleports Valkyrie, Misty, Annabelle and Hippolyta to Harrowpoint Island, Washington, where Caroline le Fey has taken Dani Moonstar to use in a ritual to summon the Doommaidens. Once inside Caroline's chamber, the heroes discover that the Doommaidens have already arrived. During the subsequent battle, Annabelle manages to free Dani before the Doommaidens halt their fighting, recognizing Valkyrie as their "sister".

The heroes retreat to Misty's safe house in New York City as the doom maidens give chase. There, Valkyrie has a vision from long ago of herself leading an attack against Odin. Valkyrie then decides to take Dani and Hippolyta and lead the doom maidens away from the city, while Misty and Annabelle call Heroes for Hire for help.

During the Age of Ultron, Wolverine and the Invisible Woman travel back in time and assassinate Ultron's creator, Hank Pym, to prevent Ultron from taking over the world. In the divergent timeline created by Pym's death, Morgan le Fey and her husband Doctor Doom conquer half the planet. Morgan and Doom's daughter, Caroline recruits Hippolyta to seek revenge for abandoning Caroline as a child. In Latveria, Caroline and Hippolyta discover that Doom has died and has been replaced by Ares, Hippolyta's father. Hippolyta defeats Ares and takes back command of the Amazons, who have been subdued by Ares.

Valkyrie, Dani and Hippolyta lead the doom maidens to an Asgardian ruin in Descanso de Deus, Brazil. There, the three are outnumbered and near defeat before Misty and Annabelle arrive with reinforcements. Caroline reveals to Dani that Valkyrie intends to syphon Dani's powers at the ruin. With Dani's powers, Valkyrie transforms into the berserker-like maiden of rage.

Valkyrie, the maiden of rage, destroys the doom maidens and then turns on her allies, while Caroline escapes. After Valkyrie defeats the heroes, she sets her sights on a nearby village. Annabelle follows in pursuit and is able to quell Valkyrie's rage with her love, but Annabelle is killed in the process. Valkyrie returns with Annabelle's body and calls for the formation of a new Defenders, however the heroes rebuke Valkyrie's offer. Meanwhile, Caroline begins searching for new doom maidens amongst the villainesses of Earth.

In Valhalla, Annabelle struggles to adjust to the afterlife, while Valkyrie searches for Clea. After fending off some trolls, Clea agrees to help Valkyrie bring Annabelle back to life in exchange for a sacrifice. Clea transports Annabelle to New York City, where she reunites with Misty and discovers that her lifeforce has been merged with Valkyrie's and she is now Valkyrie's host.

Misty and Annabelle investigate a monster problem in New York's Chinatown and ask Elsa Bloodstone for assistance. They discover that the Ghost Boys gang have been using Brood hatchlings to carry out hits in the neighborhood. Valkyrie, Misty and Elsa track a hatchling to an underground lair, where Hai-Dai ninjas are bio-engineering Brood eggs. The three aided by No-Name of the Brood defeat the Hai-Dai and their master, Zheng Bao Yu. Afterwards, Bao Yu turns to Caroline for protection.

In New York City, the Fearless Defenders attempt to stop the Doom Maidens from awakening the Pandemonium Axles, evil sculpture-like creatures that have remained dormant underground for sometime. Meanwhile, the significant others of each of the Fearless Defenders have invited them to a bar to convince them to disband. The fight reaches the bar and together with their partners, the Fearless Defenders defeat the Doom Maidens and the Pandemonium Axles. However, the women decide to stay together without any assistance from their mates.

During the Infinity event, Ren Kimura, a dancer living in New York City, is exposed to Terrigen Mist, causing the dormant Inhuman genes in her DNA to awaken. Meanwhile, the Wardogs of Thanos comb through the city, exterminating newly formed Inhumans, but are stopped by Caroline and her Doom Maidens, who seek the new Inhumans for their own purposes. Ren is rescued by the Fearless Defenders, but are cornered by the Doom Maidens. When the fight is over, Ren joins the Fearless Defenders as they push through the city and search for Ren's parents.

Hippolyta invites the Fearless Defenders to New Amazonia for some rest and relaxation. There, Hippolyta explains that she has been charged by the Death-Lords to rebuild the ranks of the Amazons in exchange for her resurrection. The following morning, New Amazonia is attacked by Aradnea, Echidna, and Echidna's sea-monsters on orders from Caroline Le Fey. After the monsters are defeated, Caroline reveals that the attack was a test and offers to become the Amazons' queen.

In Los Angeles, Misty recruits Frankie Raye for a mission to put an end to the Doom Maidens once-and-for-all. The Fearless Defenders find the Doom Maidens in the final stages of a ritual to grant Caroline the powers that she has been craving. In the subsequent battle, the Fearless Defenders defeat the Doom Maidens while Frankie siphons the energy from the ritual before Caroline can complete her transformation. However, Caroline still manages to succeed in the secondary ritual of restoring Morgan le Fey.

== Roster ==
Character	Real Name	Joined in	Notes
Valkyrie	Brunnhilde	The Fearless Defenders #1 (February 2013)	Team leader. Is merged with Annabelle Riggs in The Fearless Defenders #7 (July 2013)
Mercedes "Misty" Knight		The Fearless Defenders #1 (February 2013)	Team leader.
Annabelle Riggs		The Fearless Defenders #1 (February 2013)	Killed in The Fearless Defenders #6 (July 2013); Returns and becomes Valkyrie's host in The Fearless Defenders #7 (July 2013)
Danielle Moonstar		The Fearless Defenders #2 (March 2013)	
Warrior Woman	Hippolyta	The Fearless Defenders #3 (April 2013)	
Clea		The Fearless Defenders #7 (July 2013)	
Elsa Bloodstone		The Fearless Defenders #8 (August 2013)	
Ren Kimura		The Fearless Defenders #10 (October 2013)	
Nova	Frankie Raye	The Fearless Defenders #12 (December 2013)	

== Critical reaction ==
Professional reviews
	CBR	Comic Vine	IGN
- Issue: Rating
1	3/5 stars	5/5 stars	9.0/10
2	2.5/5 stars	3/5 stars	7.1/10
3	2.5/5 stars	4/5 stars	7.9/10
4	3/5 stars	4/5 stars	7.9/10
4AU	4/5 stars	—N/a	—N/a
5	2.5/5 stars	3/5 stars	8.5/10
6	3/5 stars	—N/a	—N/a
7	4/5 stars	5/5 stars	9.3
8	—N/a	—N/a	6.9

Doug Zawisza of Comic Book Resources (CBR) gave the first issue three out of five stars writing, "Overall, Fearless Defenders #1 offers a coincidental threat to bring Misty Knight and Valkyrie together, but that threat isn't completely realized for readers to grasp the full level." Sara Lima of Comic Vine gave it five out of five stars writing, "Sexy, smart and strong: if this series is anything like this first issue, then it might just be my new 'must-read.'" Melissa Grey of IGN gave it a 9.0 out of 10 writing, "The ladies of Fearless Defenders are a force to be reckoned with in this stellar first issue." George Marston of Newsarama gave it an 8 out of 10 writing, "With a little bit of Lethal Weapon, a little of The Da Vinci Code, and lots of Marvel charm, there are more than enough hooks to make this book worth your continued attention."

Kelly Thompson of CBR gave issue #2 two-and-a-half stars writing, "So far, Fearless Defenders is filled with potential that can't quite realize itself and while this second issue by Cullen Bunn and Will Sliney is better than the first, it still feels like it needed more time in the oven to cook." Lima of Comic Vine gave it three stars writing, "Overall, this issue was not as solid as the first one. There were moments where the story felt slightly confusing and characters were just abruptly introduced into the story in a way that didn't really make sense." Grey of IGN gave it a 7.1 writing, "The art seems designed to emphasize the distinctly male gaze-oriented sexiness of the characters while the writing focuses on their resourcefulness, tenacity, and courage."

Zawisa of CBR gave issue #3 two-and-a-half stars writing, "Fearless Defenders #3 is a snippet from a longer arc and reads as such, but that doesn't stop it from providing some entertainment and solid character bits for future issues as the team continues to coagulate while Bunn tries to find appropriate voices for each of Valkyrie's new allies". Lima gave it four stars writing, "Bunn has put together an interesting team and this issue is considerably better than issue #2. I for one am definitely looking forward to the continuation of this series." Grey gave it a 7.9 writing, "Cullen Bunn ties together more than a few loose plot threads in The Fearless Defenders #3."

Ryan Lindsay of CBR gave issue #4 three stars writing, "The Fearless Defenders #4 is an entertaining issue chock full of story and solid moments. Bunn packs the pages with dialogue, which can feel bulky at times, but it means he can chock in quite a lot of narrative for one issue." Lima also gave issue #4 four stars writing, "This issue is very balanced: it has everything from mystery to humor and the pacing is really good. Of the issues before it, this is certainly one of the best in the way that it showcases these characters individually whilst continuing to develop a story that is both interesting and entertaining." Grey again gave it a 7.9 writing, "Now that the personalities of the Fearless Defenders are slotting into place and the shady force behind the rise of the Doom Maidens is amping up her villainy, The Fearless Defenders is shaping up to be one of the more unique and enjoyable titles in Marvel's monthly lineup."

Zawisa gave issue #4AU four stars, praising the work of writer Cullen Bunn and artist Phil Jimenez, writing, "The story itself is independent enough to be enjoyable, but connected enough to add value to Age of Ultron. In short, this is what an event tie-in comic book should be like. I just hope [Phil] Jimenez comes back for more soon."

Kelly Thompson of CBR gave issue #5 two-and-a-half stars writing, "While the writing and character work is coming together nicely, "Fearless Defenders" #5 still has serious art problems to work out before this book can be considered a contender." Lima gave it three stars writing, "Although the appearance of so many characters in one book reads awkwardly, some of the dialogue was clever and funny and that at least redeemed the contents of this issue a little bit, at least for me." Grey gave issue it an 8.5 writing, "If you're looking for a book that's unabashedly fun and you're not reading this series... look at your life. Look at your choices."

Meagan Damore of CBR gave issue #6 three stars writing, "For their sixth issue together, Bunn and Sliney provide a middle-of-the-road conclusion that neither wows nor disappoints. With Bunn's knack for character development, however, the book stays solid and maintains its potential."

Zawisa gave issue #7 four stars, praising the work of artist Stephanie Hans, writing, "Fearless Defenders #7 takes what could, and maybe should, have been a breather issue for the characters and readers and emotionally amplifies it. Hans' beautiful artwork is perfect for a story of love and sacrifice. It will be interesting to see what visual approach this title takes next issue and beyond, but for now, this is one of the best-looking issues for this series." Corey Schroeder of Comic Vine gave it five stars writing, "Without going into TOO much detail, I will say that I love that this issue brings back a trope from old Thor comics and applies it to Valkyrie in a way that is far more interesting than even the original was." Grey gave it a 9.3, writing, "There's an energy to the book's visuals that is equal parts elegant and exciting. Bunn and Hans make for a hell of a team and issue #7 proves to be one of the series' best yet."

Grey gave issue #8 a 6.9, writing, "The title's overabundance of characters can sometimes feel like an embarrassment of riches, but this time, it feels more like an obstacle to coherence. Bunn does an impressive job juggling so many faces, old and new, but the story might be better served by slimming down the cast to more manageable proportions."

== Collected editions ==
Title	Material collected	Publication date	ISBN
Fearless Defenders Volume 1: Doom Maidens	Fearless Defenders 1-6	August 27, 2013	978-0785168485
Fearless Defenders Volume 2: The Most Fabulous Fighting Team of All	Fearless Defenders 7-12	February 25, 2014	978-0785168492
