= And Then There Were None (disambiguation) =

And Then There Were None is a 1939 novel by Agatha Christie, originally titled Ten Little Niggers and later also published as Ten Little Indians.

And Then There Were None may also refer to:

== Adaptations of Christie's novel ==
- And Then There Were None (play), a 1943 play by Agatha Christie
- And Then There Were None (1945 film), a film by René Clair
- Ten Little Indians (1965 film), a film by George Pollock
- And Then There Were None (1974 film), a film by Peter Collinson
- And Then There Were None (1987 film), a Soviet film by Stanislav Govorukhin
- Ten Little Indians (1989 film) or And Then There Were None, a film by Harry Alan Towers
- Agatha Christie: And Then There Were None, a 2005 computer game
- And Then There Were None (TV series), a 2015 television series
- And Then There Were None, a 1944 Dundee Repertory Theatre Company adaptation
- And Then There Were None, a 2005 play by Kevin Elyot, directed by Steven Pimlott

== Music ==
- And Then There Were None (band), an American rock band
- "And Then There Were None", a song by Exodus from Bonded by Blood
- "And Then There Were None", two singles by The Enid, 1982 and 1984
- "And Then There Were None", a song from the musical Spring Awakening
- And Then There Were None..., a 2016 album by Church Of Misery

== Other uses ==
- "And Then There Were None" (CSI), an episode of CSI: Crime Scene Investigation
- "...And Then There Were None" (Supernatural), an episode of Supernatural
- And Then There Were None, an episode of Ben 10: Omniverse (Season 5)
- "And Then There Were None", an episode of Gilligan's Island (Season 3)
- ...And Then There Were None, a 1951 science-fiction novella by Eric Frank Russell, adapted for his 1962 novel The Great Explosion
- And Then There Were None, an anti-abortion organisation for ex-clinic workers managed by Abby Johnson
- "and then there were none", a phrase from the 1868 children's rhyme "Ten Little Injuns"
- "And Then There Were None", a short story by Eric Frank Russell
- "And Then There Were (N-One)", a 2017 science fiction novella by Sarah Pinsker

== See also ==
- Ten Little Indians (disambiguation)
- Ten Little Niggers (disambiguation)
