= Ten Little Indians (disambiguation) =

"Ten Little Indians" is a modern children's rhyme.

Ten Little Indians may also refer to:

== Literature and Film ==
- A previous title of And Then There Were None, a 1939 novel by Agatha Christie
  - A previous title of the 1943 play, And Then There Were None, by Agatha Christie adapting her novel
  - Ten Little Indians (1965 film), an adaptation of Christie's novel directed by George Pollock
  - Ten Little Indians (1974 film), or And Then There Were None, an adaptation of Christie's novel, directed by Peter Collinson
  - Ten Little Indians (1989 film), an adaptation of Christie's novel, directed by Alan Birkinshaw
- Ten Little Indians (short story collection), a 2003 collection by Sherman Alexie

== Music ==
- "Ten Little Indians" (The Beach Boys song), 1962
- "Ten Little Indians" (Harry Nilsson song), also covered by The Yardbirds, 1967
- "Ten Little Indians", a song by The Bastard Fairies from Memento Mori
- "Ten Little Indians", a song from the 2008 rock musical Bloody Bloody Andrew Jackson
- "Ten Little Indians", a song by Bill Haley and His Comets released in 1953

== Other uses ==
- "Ten Little Indians" (Davey and Goliath), an episode of the TV series Davey and Goliath
- Ten Little Indians, a 1983 computer game written by Brian Howarth

== See also ==
- "Ten Little Injuns", an 1868 song written by Septimus Winner
- Ten Little Niggers (disambiguation), a variant title of the children's rhyme
- And Then There Were None (disambiguation), other adaptations of Christie
