= Little Indian =

Little Indian may refer to:

- Little Indian, Illinois, an unincorporated community in the US
- Little Indian River (Michigan), US
- Little-endian, a binary encoding schema

== See also ==
- Little-endian, in computing
- Ten Little Indians (disambiguation)
