= Ten Little Niggers =

Ten Little Niggers may refer to:

- "Ten Little Indians", a modern children's rhyme, a major variant of which is "Ten Little Niggers"
- And Then There Were None, a 1939 novel by Agatha Christie which was originally published as Ten Little Niggers and later as Ten Little Indians
  - And Then There Were None (play), a 1943 play by Agatha Christie adapting her novel, performed in the United Kingdom as Ten Little Niggers
  - And Then There Were None (1945 film), released in the UK as Ten Little Niggers
  - Desyat Negrityat (lit. 'Ten Little Negroes', Russian: Десять негритят), 1987 Soviet film adaptation

== See also ==
- And Then There Were None (disambiguation)
- Ten Little Indians (disambiguation)
