= James Friend =

British cinematographer

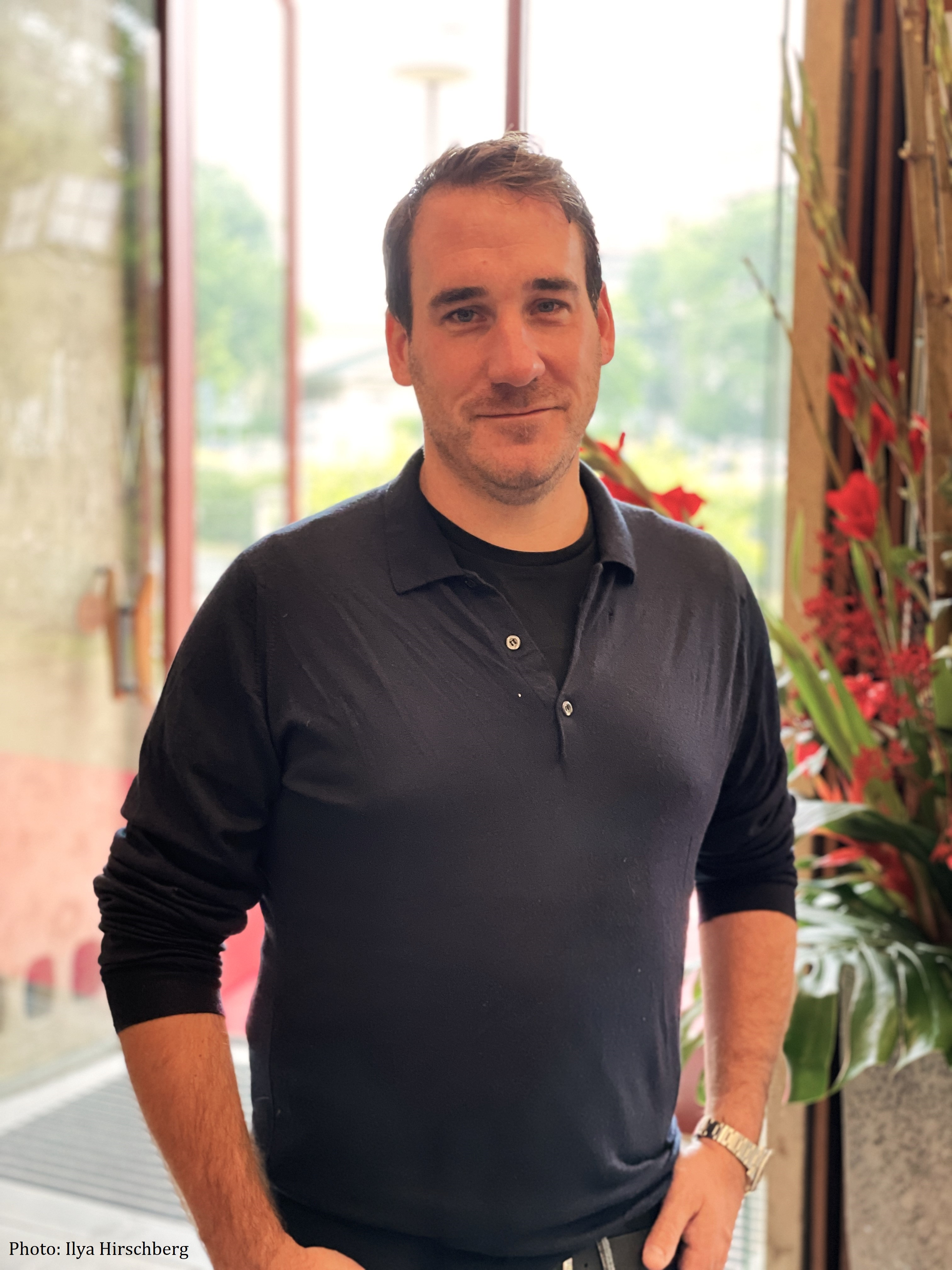
Friend at FilmFest Munich in 2023

James Friend is a British cinematographer.

He won the Academy Award for Best Cinematography on Edward Berger's All Quiet on the Western Front.

== Early life and career ==
Friend grew up in Maidstone, Kent, where he attended Sutton Valence School. He was awarded a Fellowship from the Royal Photographic Society for his film work in 2020.

Friend's television credits include Patrick Melrose and Your Honor, both of which he collaborated on with Berger. Additionally, Friend worked on the 2024 Disney+ series The Acolyte, an installment in the Star Wars franchise.

In 2024, Friend received an Honorary Fellowship from The Royal Photographic Society.

== Filmography ==
=== Feature film ===
Year	Title	Director	Notes
2006	The Man Who Sold the World	Louis Melville	
2009	Umbrage	Drew Cullingham	
2010	Just for the Record	Steven Lawson	
2010	Dead Cert	Steven Lawson	
2010	Stalker	Martin Kemp	
2011	Carmen's Kiss	David Fairman	
2011	Jack Falls	Paul Tanter; Alexander Williams	
2011	Ghosted	Craig Viveiros	
2011	Turnout	Lee Sales	
2011	The Hike	Rupert Bryan	
2011	7 Lives	Paul Wilkins	With Nick Gordon Smith
2012	Truth or Dare	Robert Heath	
2012	Piggy	Kieron Hawkes	
2012	Papadopoulos & Sons	Marcus Markou	
2012	Enzo	Alana O'Neill	Documentary film
2013	The Liability	Craig Viveiros	
2014	Lords of London	Antonio Simoncini	
2014	The Guvnors	Gabe Turner	
2016	Breakdown	Jonnie Malachi	
2022	All Quiet on the Western Front	Edward Berger	
2025	Ballad of a Small Player	Edward Berger	Also credited as associate producer
2027	The Great Beyond †	J. J. Abrams	Post-production
2027	The Lord of the Rings: The Hunt for Gollum †	Andy Serkis	Filming

=== Television ===
Year	Title	Director	Notes
2006	StereoStep	Craig Viveiros	TV short
2008	The Secret World of Sam King	Benjamin Caron	
2015	Lewis	David Drury	Episode "What Lies Tangled" (Part 1 and Part 2)
2015–16	Silent Witness	Ashley Pearce; Patrick Lau; Danny Hiller; Douglas Mackinnon; David Drury	12 episodes
2016	Beowulf: Return to the Shieldlands	Marek Losey	3 episodes
2016	The Musketeers	Udayan Prasad	Episodes "Prisoners of War" and "We Are the Garrison"
2017	Stan Lee's Lucky Man	Marek Losey; Daniel O'Hara	4 episodes
2017	The Late Late Show with James Corden	Glenn Clements	1 episode
2017	Victoria	Daniel O'Hara	Episodes "The King Over the Water" and "The Luxury of Conscience"
2017–18	Strike	Michael Keillor; Kieron Hawkes	3 episodes
2020	Cursed	Zetna Fuentes	Episodes "Nimue" and "Cursed"
2020	Your Honor	Edward Berger	Episodes "Part One", "Part Two" and "Part Three"
2022	Willow	Philippa Lowthorpe	Episodes "Wildwood" and "Prisoners of Skellin"
2024	The Acolyte	Kogonada; Hanelle Culpepper	4 episodes

Miniseries

Year	Title	Director	Notes
2014	Street Fighter: Assassin's Fist	Joey Ansah	Episode "Beginnings"
2016	Rillington Place	Craig Viveiros	
2018	Patrick Melrose	Edward Berger	
2019	MotherFatherSon	Charles Sturridge; James Kent	5 episodes
2019	The War of the Worlds	Craig Viveiros	

== Awards and nominations ==
Year	Award	Category	Title	Result	Ref.
2022	Academy Awards	Best Cinematography	All Quiet on the Western Front	Won	
2022	BAFTA Awards	Best Cinematography	All Quiet on the Western Front	Won	
2017	British Society of Cinematographers	Best Cinematography in a Television Drama	Rillington Place	Nominated	
2018	British Society of Cinematographers	Best Cinematography in a Television Drama	Patrick Melrose	Won	
2021	British Society of Cinematographers	Best Cinematography in a Television Drama	Your Honor	Nominated	
2022	British Society of Cinematographers	Best Cinematography in a Theatrical Feature Film	All Quiet on the Western Front	Won	
2018	Camerimage	First Look Award	Patrick Melrose	Won	
2022	Camerimage	Golden Frog	All Quiet on the Western Front	Nominated	
