= British Society of Cinematographers Award for Best Cinematography in a Television Drama =

BSC Award for Best Cinematography in a Television Drama
- Location: United Kingdom
- Presented by: British Society of Cinematographers
- Currently held by: Jody Lee Lipes for The Listeners (2024); Benedict Spence for Eric (2024)
- Website: https://bscine.com/

The British Society of Cinematographers Award for Best Cinematography in a Television Drama is an award given annually by the British Society of Cinematographers (BSC). It was first given in 2011, with a set of nominees (usually between four and five) being presented ever since.

British cinematographer Gavin Finney is the only person to receive the award more than once, with two wins: in 2013 for The Fear, and in 2015 for Wolf Hall.

In 2024, the category was split into two according to the program's country of origin and television distribution format: UK Terrestrial and International/Streaming.

== Winners and nominees ==
=== 2010s ===
Year	Title	Episode	Recipient(s)	Broadcaster
2011	Stolen		Rob Hardy	BBC One
2011	The Night Watch		David Katznelson	BBC Two
2011	Spiral		Roger Simonsz	Canal+
2012	Blackout		Chris Ross	BBC One
2012	Parade's End		Mike Eley	BBC Two
2012	The Hollow Crown	"Henry IV"	Ben Smithard	BBC Two
2012	Game of Thrones	"Blackwater"	Sam McCurdy	HBO
2012	Titanic		Adam Suschitzky	ITV
2013	The Fear		Gavin Finney	Channel 4
2013	Ripper Street	"What Use Our Work?"	PJ Dillon	BBC One
2013	Top Boy		Christopher Ross	Channel 4
2013	The Borgias	"The Gunpowder Plot"	Paul Sarossy	Showtime
2014	Quirke	"Christine Falls"	Tony Miller	BBC One
2014	Breathless		Tim Palmer	ITV
2014	An Adventure in Time and Space		John Pardue	BBC Two
2014	Legacy		Felix Wiedemann	BBC Two
2014	The Great Train Robbery	"A Robber's Tale"	George Richmond	BBC One
2015	Wolf Hall	"Entirely Beloved"	Gavin Finney	BBC Two
2015	Penny Dreadful	"And They Were Enemies"	PJ Dillon	Sky Atlantic
2015	Jonathan Strange & Mr Norrell	"Jonathan Strange & Mr Norrell"	Stephan Pehrsson	BBC One
2015	Game of Thrones	"Hardhome"	Fabian Wagner	HBO
2016	The Go-Between		Felix Wiedemann	BBC One
2016	Game of Thrones	"The Winds of Winter"	Fabian Wagner	HBO
2016	An Inspector Calls		Martin Fuhrer	BBC One
2016	The Living and the Dead	"Episode 3"	Matt Gray	BBC One
2016	The Dresser		Ben Smithard	BBC Two
2017	Taboo	"Episode 4"	Mark Patten	BBC One
2017	The Crown	"Smoke and Mirrors"	Adriano Goldman	Netflix
2017	The Witness for the Prosecution	"Episode 1"	Felix Wiedemann	BBC One
2017	Rillington Place	"Tim"	James Friend	BBC One
2017	The State	"Episode 3"	Gavin Finney	Channel 4
2018	Patrick Melrose	"Bad News"	James Friend	Sky Atlantic
2018	The Crown	"Beryl"	Adriano Goldman	Netflix
2018	The Crown	"Misadventure"	Stuart Howell	Netflix
2018	A Very English Scandal		Danny Cohen	BBC One
2018	Killing Eve	"I Don't Want to Be Free"	Julian Court	BBC Three
2019	Chernobyl		Jakob Ihre	HBO / Sky Atlantic
2019	Good Omens	"Hard Times"	Gavin Finney	BBC Two
2019	The Handmaid's Tale	"Night"	Colin Watkinson	Hulu
2019	His Dark Materials	"Spies"	Suzie Lavelle	BBC One
2019	The Witcher	"The End's Beginning"	Gavin Struthers	Netflix

=== 2020s ===
Year	Title	Episode	Recipient(s)	Broadcaster
2020	Normal People	"Episode 1"	Suzie Lavelle	BBC Three
2020	The Crown	"Fairytale"	Adriano Goldman	Netflix
2020	The Queen's Gambit	"End Game"	Steven Meizler	Netflix
2020	Devs		Rob Hardy	FX on Hulu
2020	Small Axe	"Mangrove"	Shabier Kirchner	Prime Video / BBC One
2021	Landscapers	"Episode 3"	Erik Alexander Wilson	HBO / Sky Atlantic
2021	Fargo	"East/West"	Dana Gonzales	FX
2021	It's a Sin	"Episode 1"	David Katznelson	Channel 4
2021	The Pursuit of Love	"Episode 1"	Zac Nicholson	BBC One
2021	Your Honor	"Part One"	James Friend	Showtime
2022	The Tourist	"Episode 1"	Ben Wheeler	BBC One
2022	Andor	"One Way Out"	Adriano Goldman	Disney+
2022	House of the Dragon	"The Heirs of the Dragon"	Fabian Wagner	HBO
2022	Pachinko	"Chapter Three"	Florian Hoffmeister	Apple TV+
2022	Slow Horses	"Bad Tradecraft"	Danny Cohen	Apple TV+
2023	Dead Ringers	"One"	Jody Lee Lipes	Prime Video
2023	A Small Light	"What Can Be Saved"	Stuart Howell	National Geographic
2023	Bodies	"You're Already Dead"	Joel Devlin	Netflix
2023	Foundation	"In Seldon's Shadow"	Cathal Watters	Apple TV+
2023	Great Expectations	"Episode 3"	Dan Atherton	BBC One
2024
2024	Best Cinematography in a Television Drama (UK Terrestrial)			
2024	The Listeners	"Episode One"	Jody Lee Lipes	BBC One
2024	Sweetpea	"Sorry For Your Loss"	Nick Morris	Sky Atlantic
2024	Ludwig	"Episode One"	Annika Summerson	BBC One
2024	This Town	"Episode Four"	Ben Wheeler	BBC One
2024	We Are Lady Parts	"Funny Muslim Song"	Diana Olifirova	Channel 4
2024	Best Cinematography in a Television Drama (International/Streaming)			
2024	Eric	"Episode One"	Benedict Spence	Netflix
2024	Disclaimer	"I"	Emmanuel Lubezki, Bruno Delbonnel	Apple TV+
2024	Ripley	"V Lucio"	Robert Elswit	Netflix
2024	Shōgun	"Anjin"	Christopher Ross	FX
2024	Shōgun	"Crimson Sky"	Sam McCurdy	FX

== See also ==
- British Academy Television Craft Award for Best Photography & Lighting: Fiction
- Primetime Emmy Award for Outstanding Cinematography for a Single-Camera Series (One Hour)
- Primetime Emmy Award for Outstanding Cinematography for a Limited or Anthology Series or Movie
