= The House of Usher (1989 film) =

- Directed by: Alan Birkinshaw
- Screenplay by: Michael J. Murray
- Based on: "The Fall of the House of Usher" by Edgar Allan Poe
- Produced by: Harry Alan Towers
- Starring: Oliver Reed; Donald Pleasence; Romy Walthall
- Cinematography: Yossi Wein
- Edited by: Michael J. Duthie
- Music by: Gary Chang; George S. Clinton
- Production company: Breton Film Productions
- Distributed by: 21st Century Film Corporation
- Release date: April 13, 1989
- Running time: 92 minutes
- Countries: United States; United Kingdom; Canada
- Language: English

The House of Usher is a 1989 horror film directed by Alan Birkinshaw and starring Oliver Reed, Donald Pleasence, and Romy Walthall. It is an adaptation of "The Fall of the House of Usher" (1839) by Edgar Allan Poe.

== Story ==
Molly and her fiancé Ryan travel to London to visit his uncle. On the way, Ryan swerves to miss two ghostly children who appear in the road, crashing their car. Molly runs to the estate to get help and walks into a nightmare. Ryan's uncle Roderick wants Molly for himself and has imprisoned his brother Walter in an upstairs room. Walter escapes by murdering the maid and then also murders her daughter before attacking Roderick in an attempt to end the family line. Roderick however, throws Walter from some stairs as the house catches on fire. During their fight, Molly flees and frees Ryan from his drugged stupor inside a sarcophagus, Ryan and Roderick fight as Molly flees the house. The film ends with a replay of the scene of Molly and Ryan lost trying to find his uncle's house: this time Molly suggests going back the way they came.

== Cast ==
- Oliver Reed as Roderick Usher
- Donald Pleasence as Walter Usher
- Romy Walthall as Molly McNulty
- Rufus Swart as Ryan Usher
- Norman Coombes as Clive Derrick
- Anne Stradi as Mrs. Derrick
- Carole Farquhar as Gwen

== Release ==
The film has been released on Blu-ray by Vinegar Syndrome under their Vinegar Syndrome Archives label.
