= And Then There Were None (manga) =

2025 manga series by Aya Nikaido

- Cover of the first manga volume

そして誰もいなくなった (Soshite Dare mo Inakunatta)
- Genre: Mystery
- Created by: Agatha Christie
- Manga
- Written by: Aya Nikaido
- Published by: Hayakawa Publishing
- English publisher: NA: Viz Media
- Imprint: Christie Library
- Magazine: Hayacomic
- Original run: 23 July 2024 – 17 December 2024
- Volumes: 3

And Then There Were None (そして誰もいなくなった, Soshite Dare mo Inakunatta) is a Japanese manga series written and illustrated by Aya Nikaido, an adaptation of the Agatha Christie's murder mystery novel of the same name. One of the first titles of Hayakawa Publishing's Hayacomic website, it was first serialized from July to December 2024 and later released in a three-volume set in February 2025.

== Plot ==
Ten people are invited to a mansion on Soldier Island by a mysterious person known as U. N. Owen. Eventually, each of them dies over time, resulting in the party accusing each other of the murder.

== Publication ==
On 3 July 2024, a manga adaptation of Agatha Christie's novel And Then There Were None was announced as one of the inaugural titles of Hayakawa Publishing's Hayacomic website for adapting science fiction and mystery classics into manga. It was also announced that the illustrator would be Aya Nikaido. A cover illustrator for previous Japanese-language editions of Christie works, Nikaido attended the Tokyo Animation College's character illustration course, but had previously declined several offers to illustrate manga series.

Nikaido based the manga's dramatic suspense on the Japanese concept of ma. Other techniques she used in illustrating the work's story included promoting contrast in scenes and character expressions, alluding to the original's animalistic metaphors, and enhancing visual flow to make scenes harder to skip. Nikaido stated that the idea of an adaptation "broadens perspectives" by allowing comparisons of specific scenes between mediums. Nikaido stated that despite the pressure associated with writing manga, the manga's nature as an adaptation of an "[existing] masterpiece became a source of strength".

The manga's 23 chapters were serialized on Hayacomic from 23 July to 17 December 2024.

By the day after the announcement, the manga had been licensed for sale in six countries. A three-volume set edition of the manga was released by Hayakawa's Christie Library imprint on 26 February 2025. In February 2026, Viz Media licensed the manga for English translation. The first volume was released on 15 September 2026; the date coincided with Christie's 136th birthday.

=== Volumes ===
No.	Original release date	Original ISBN	English release date	English ISBN
1	26 February 2025	978-4151305016	15 September 2026	978-1-9747-6939-1
2	26 February 2025	978-4151305023	19 January 2027	978-1-9747-6995-7
3	26 February 2025	978-4151305030	—	—

== Reception ==
Writing for Anime News Network, Rebecca Silverman and Lauren Orsini rate the manga five out of five stars, while Erica Friedman gave a 4.5 rating. Writing for Booklist, Sara Campbell praised the manga adaptation as "an opportunity for Christie's classic to connect with a new set of fans while longtime Christie enthusiasts will delight in how faithful this adaptation is to the source material", recommending it to libraries with teen demographics. Jamie Canaves of Book Riot named it one of "September’s New Mystery, Thriller, True Crime Books", calling the prospect of an official manga adaptation for the book "super exciting news" and recommending a pre-order of the second volume. Manga Bookshelf named it as a Pick of the Week, with Katherine Dacey remarking "I'm with Sean [Gaffney]: Agatha Christie FTW!".

Hannah Diffey of Screen Rant called it a "striking new interpretation as an authorized manga", remarking that its original premise provided appeal to a broader audience. Friedman called the adaptation "faithful and entertainingly tropey".

Canaves praised the manga's art for doing a "great job of putting you right into the story of guests arriving on an island and having their past bad deeds exposed." Diffey called it "expressive [while] offer[ing] a fresh perspective", and Campbell noted that it perfectly illustrates Soldier Island and character backstories, and that Nikaido managed to make each character unique. Friedman called Nikaido's art "fantastic", citing the British location and cinematic reaction shots, and Silverman praised several of the character designs".
