= The Liability =

- Directed by: Craig Viveiros
- Written by: John Wrathall
- Produced by: Rupert Jermyn; Richard Johns
- Starring: Tim Roth; Talulah Riley; Jack O'Connell; Peter Mullan
- Cinematography: James Friend
- Edited by: Pia Di Ciaula
- Music by: Victoria Wijeratne
- Production companies: Corona Pictures; Starchild Pictures
- Distributed by: Metrodome Distribution
- Release date: 13 May 2013
- Running time: 82 minutes
- Country: United Kingdom
- Language: English

The Liability (also known as The Hitman's Apprentice) is a 2013 British black comedy crime-thriller film directed by Craig Viveiros and written by John Wrathall. The film stars Tim Roth, Talulah Riley, Jack O'Connell and Peter Mullan. The film is about a teenager sent to do a day of driving for his mum's gangster boyfriend, which leads him into the world of crime.

== Plot ==
Young and naive 19-year-old slacker, Adam (Jack O'Connell), lives with his mother Nicky (Kierston Wareing) in the home of her intimidating gangster boyfriend, Peter (Peter Mullan). After Adam wrecks Peter's luxury car, Peter demands Adam work to repay him. He sends Adam to drive for a criminal associate of his. When Peter leaves, Adam looks through Peter's laptop and views footage of Peter sexually assaulting a woman.

The next day, Adam goes on the road with aging hitman, Roy (Tim Roth). After Roy kills a man, Danil, who was living in a camper in the woods, he tries to force Adam to shoot and kill a young woman (Talulah Riley) who witnesses them dismembering the dead body. When he hesitates, she escapes and drive away in their vehicle with the victim's severed hands. Not pleased, Roy uses Adam to pretend to hitchhike and they carjack a camper van from an elderly couple. They call the girl on Adam's phone and agree to pay her for the bag of severed body parts. To accomplish this, Roy robs a diner to get the necessary amount and they get the bag back.

Before the two can switch vehicles and dispose of the evidence, Roy knocks Adam unconscious and prepares to kill him. The girl reappears and runs over Roy with Adam in tow. Retreating to a water pumping station, the girl ties up Adam and interrogates him. She claims her sister was sold in a line of sex trafficking and made her way to an "Englishman". She shows Adam a photo of her sister, revealed to be the woman in video. Roy finds them and confronts the woman, starting to fight with her. Adam manages to free one of his hands and retrieve Roy's fallen gun. Regaining his memory, Adam realises Roy attempted to kill him. Angered by the betrayal, he fires off shots, wounding Roy in the torso as the girl flees. Roy pleads with him and tells Adam he was given orders to kill him as part of "the job" all along, implied that it was because he saw Peter's video.

Adam drives and injured Roy to a church for his daughter's wedding. During the ride, Roy reveals he spared Adam's life because of his innocence and tells him he has a second chance at life as Peter believes he is now dead. Adam later burns the van and destroys the evidence linking them to the Danil's murder. Adam returns home, confronting Peter with the gun and alerting Nicky to his double-crossing ways. During the confrontation, Peter gets the gun, Knocks out Nicky and drags Adam out to the garage. The woman shows up and shoots Peter in revenge for her sister. Peter starts to strangle her until she stabs and kills him.

The woman gets in her car, opens the passenger door and gives an inviting look to a bewildered Adam.

== Cast ==
- Tim Roth as Roy
- Talulah Riley as The Girl
- Jack O'Connell as Adam
- Peter Mullan as Peter
- Kierston Wareing as Nicky
- Christopher Hatherall as Ivan
- Jack McBride as Mr. Hippy
- Jenny Pike as Mrs. Hippy
- Clive Shaw as Sniper
- Andy McAdam as Diner Cashier
- Neil Eddy as Man in Photo
- Steven Charles Stobbs as Shop Keeper
- Simon Manley as Diner Customer
- Jimmy Knights as the Sniper Victim
