= Alan Birkinshaw =

British film director

- Born: 15 June 1944 (age 82); Auckland, New Zealand
- Died: January 4, 2026 (aged 81); Kingston upon Thames, UK
- Occupations: Film director; screenwriter; producer
- Relatives: Fay Weldon (half-sister)

Alan Birkinshaw, FRGS (1944 - 2026) was a British film director, writer, and television and film producer.

The son of two physicians, Birkinshaw always wanted to be an actor, but at 17, having failed his audition at LAMDA, he decided that if he couldn't act it, he'd do it for real. He travelled to Australia, and after a few months working as a jackaroo in the Australian outback, he became a horse breaker and rodeo rider. Returning to England, he joined the camera department of Lew Grade's Associated TeleVision on his 20th birthday. He worked his way up to directing, firstly in television and then via the world of commercials, into television movies and feature films.

== Early career ==
After leaving ATV, Birkinshaw worked as a freelance television cameraman. Such was the demand, he was often working seven days a week – in the television studios during the week and on outside broadcasts at the weekend. He could be working with Billy Fury, Diana Dors and Orson Welles one day, and then go on to cover the Wales - Scotland Football Match at Cardiff the next (that was the weekend of the Aberfan Pit Disaster.) He shot the first faltering steps on dry land of the first Round the World solo yachtsman, Francis Chichester, and recorded the visit of American President Richard Nixon to Downing Street.

At age 22 he directed and produced his first television drama, A Nice Dream While It Lasted, written by his sister, renowned author Fay Weldon. At 24 Birkinshaw was directing television programs for Westward Television and then London Weekend Television, including quiz shows, farming programs, live television news shows and drama.

== 1970s ==
In the early 70's, Birkinshaw directed several promotional films for the Central Office of Information, extolling the virtues of British Steel and other home-grown British products. A safety film was made for the Royal Navy on How to get out of a helicopter when it's crashed into the sea and turned upside down, for which Birkinshaw had to undergo an Aircrew Underwater Escape Training course at the Royal Navy Survival School. A female journalist reviewing the film in Ireland, was driving home after the screening, when she lost control of her car which ended upside down in a fast flowing river. Following the instructions in the film she had just seen, she was able to escape with her life.

Birkinshaw directed a ground-breaking, before-its-time, light entertainment show beamed down to the UK from a circling airplane. This was for a pirate TV station run by the then infamous Ronan O'Rahilly, who began the first-ever pirate radio station, Radio Caroline in the 1960s. Soon after that, he turned to documentaries and commercials and then moved into the world of feature films.

In the mid 1970s, Birkinshaw's production of Alice in Wonderland ran into difficulties when the RSPCA banned him from using live flamingos in the croquet scene. In an interview with ITN, the director of the London Zoo described Birkinshaw as 'barmy'.

One of his early films was Killer's Moon. Killer's Moon was described in the acclaimed "Shepperton Babylon" as the most tasteless movie in the history of the British Cinema. In spite of comments like this, Killer's Moon continues to receive write ups in important film magazines and cinema books, and some 40 years after its first release, is still being sold all over the world, and has since become a cult classic film.

Realising that making a movie was only one element in the chain of bringing back the investment of movie finance, Birkinshaw set up his own distribution company, West World Films - with moderate success. But it was soon back to production and he produced a cinema documentary Once Upon A Chance which followed a young adventurer travelling around the world in less than 48 hours on £50. The premiere of this took place in the ABC Cinema in London's Shaftesbury Avenue.

== 1980s and 1990s ==
In the early 80's, Birkinshaw made another cinema documentary about the Henley Royal Regatta, and a short cinema thriller which he wrote and directed called Dead End. This was followed by several concerts in the Albert Hall, The first, a dramatized concert which Birkinshaw also wrote, featuring Gilbert and Sullivan (played by Peter Cellier as Gilbert and John Rapley as Sullivan) watching their works performed by guest soloists and the Royal Choral Society - The Best of Gilbert and Sullivan., This was followed by An Orchestral Tribute to the Beatles with Joan Collins presenting the 140 piece Royal Philharmonic Orchestra and the Royal Choral Society, in the presence of Queen Elizabeth ll, The Duke of Edinburgh and Paul McCartney. A third concert in the Albert Hall was Not So Silent Night – A Christmas story told in carols. This was in the presence of HRHs Prince and Princess Michael of Kent.

After signing a contract on the back of a napkin in a restaurant on the Champs-Élysées, Birkinshaw was hired to direct an action adventure movie variously called Greed and Invaders of the Lost Gold. This movie was shot in the Philippines and starred Stuart Whitman, Harold Sakata, Edmund Purdom and English actress Glynis Barber. The original screenplay was unworkable and Birkinshaw had to re-write the next day's script overnight, presenting the actors the latest version each day at the breakfast table. Birkinshaw also contributed to two feature films: Don’t Open Till Christmas (using the pseudonym Al McGoohan as writer and additional director), and directed additional action scenes in the Agatha Christie story Ordeal by Innocence, starring Donald Sutherland.

In 1986, Birkinshaw went to India where he directed an award-winning film on the life of Jawaharlal Nehru, entitled But I Have Promises To Keep, which had been commissioned by Rajiv Gandhi and was made for the Government of India via Doordarshan, the national television network of India. The film was supposed to take three months in production, but ended up taking a year and a half. Now residing in an apartment in Saket, a suburb of Delhi, Birkinshaw used his spare time to study ancient Indian civilisations and artefacts, and research into his favourite historical subject, the Indian Mutiny of 1857. Questions were asked in the Lok Sabha, Indian Parliament, as to why an English director had been employed to make a film about Indian's National Hero, and not an Indian director.

Returning from India, Birkinshaw directed several movies from original stories by Agatha Christie and Edgar Allan Poe with stars such as Oliver Reed, Donald Pleasence, Donald Sutherland, Herbert Lom, Brenda Vaccaro and Moira Lister – Ten Little Indians, The House of Usher and Masque of the Red Death.

Birkinshaw also directed the boxing movie Punch starring Donald Sutherland and Swiss actor, Ernst Sigrist, based on a true story of the Swiss champion boxer, Walter Blaser. The boxing sequences were hailed as extraordinary given the time and the budget. There was a certain amount of controversy at the time around Birkinshaw's role as director of Punch, as the movie was a Swiss German French co-production and Birkinshaw is a New Zealand born Britisher.

Punch was followed by more work in Germany where Birkinshaw directed several episodes of the action series Zorc, starring the volatile German actor, Klaus Löwitsch and Michele Marian, and three 90 minute episodes of Die Unbestechliche, starring Maja Maranow and Martin Benrath.

Between his assignments in Germany, Birkinshaw directed several episodes of Space Precinct, at the time the most expensive TV series ever made.

== Recent Activity ==
Making films and documentaries in far flung locations like Cuba, Florida and Singapore was becoming the norm for Birkinshaw, and after directing several documentaries about the making of the famous Unipart Calendar, he realised that there was life other than in movies, and his passion for telling stories took him into the world of sculpture, recreating some of the greatest works by the world's classical sculptors. The Creation of Adam, based on Michelangelo's work in the Sistine Chapel is one, and the story of Alexander the Great's triumphant march into Babylon, original by the famed neo-classical sculptor, Bertel Thorvaldsen, is another.

During his spare time, Birkinshaw made promotional videos of his home town, Kingston upon Thames, on his iPhone, under the production title Laughin' Dog. He also wrote 3 books, 2 for children, “Heidi and the Elephant” and “The Fat Swan”, and an adventure novel entitled “The Road to Malabar” about the hunt for the Peacock Throne, using the pen name, Rayle Mackenzie. (Mackenzie was Birkinshaw's middle name.)

Alan Birkinshaw died on 4 January 2026

== Selected filmography ==
- The Man Who Couldn’t Get Enough (1974)
- Killer's Moon (1978)
- Ordeal by Innocence (1984)
- Don't Open ’Til Christmas (1984)
- But I have Promises To Keep (1985)
- Sweeter Than Wine (1988)
- Ten Little Indians (1989)
- The House of Usher (1989)
- Masque of the Red Death (1989)
- Punch! (1994)
