= The War of the Worlds (British TV series) =

2019 BBC serial

- Genre: Drama; Horror; Science fiction
- Based on: The War of the Worlds by H. G. Wells
- Written by: Peter Harness
- Directed by: Craig Viveiros
- Starring: Eleanor Tomlinson; Rafe Spall; Robert Carlyle; Rupert Graves; Nicholas Le Prevost; Harry Melling; Jonathan Aris
- Composer: Russ Davies
- Country of origin: United Kingdom
- No. of series: 1
- No. of episodes: 3

Production
- Executive producers: Damien Timmer; Preethi Mavahalli; Peter Harness; Craig Viveiros; Tommy Bulfin; Minglu Ma; Jamie Brown
- Producer: Betsan Morris Evans
- Production location: United Kingdom
- Cinematography: James Friend
- Production companies: Mammoth Screen; BBC; Creasun Media; Red Square

Original release
- Network: BBC One
- Release: 17 November – 1 December 2019

The War of the Worlds is a British three-part science fiction drama television series, produced by Mammoth Screen for the BBC and co-produced with Creasun Media and Red Square. The series is an Edwardian period adaptation of H.G. Wells' 1898 science fiction novel of the same name about a Martian invasion, and is the first British television adaptation of the novel. The War of the Worlds premiered in other countries before its UK broadcast on the BBC between 17 November and 1 December 2019.

== Premise ==
In Edwardian England, 1905, journalist George (Rafe Spall) has left his unhappy marriage behind to start a life with his partner Amy (Eleanor Tomlinson), an aspiring researcher, in the town of Woking. There, they befriend Ogilvy (Robert Carlyle), an astronomer and scientist. After a meteorite lands in the woods and proves to be more dangerous than it first appeared, they must fight to survive amid an alien invasion.

== Cast ==
=== Main ===
- Eleanor Tomlinson as Amy
- Rafe Spall as George
- Robert Carlyle as Ogilvy
- Rupert Graves as Frederick
- Nicholas Le Prevost as Chamberlain
- Harry Melling as Artilleryman
- Jonathan Aris as Priest

=== Recurring and guest ===
- Susan Wooldridge as Mrs. Elphinstone
- Charlie De'Ath as Greaves
- Joey Batey as Henderson
- Freya Allan as Mary
- Daniel Cerqueira as Stent
- Aisling Jarrett-Gavin as Lucy
- Woody Norman as George Junior
- Reid Anderson as Stall Holder

== Episodes ==
No.	Episode	Directed by	Written by	Original UK air date	UK viewers (millions)
1	Episode 1	Craig Viveiros	Peter Harness	17 November 2019	6.92
2	Episode 2	Craig Viveiros	Peter Harness	24 November 2019	5.80
3	Episode 3	Craig Viveiros	Peter Harness	1 December 2019	5.49

== Production ==
=== Development ===
The War of the Worlds was first announced in December 2015, with the BBC confirming production of the series in May 2017. The series was produced by Mammoth Screen for the BBC, co-produced with Creasun Media, in association with Red Square.

Writer Peter Harness expanded the role of the narrator's wife from the novel, stating "I think the clearest choice that I made from the start of this project was to give the male character a wife who had strength of character in her own right [...] It was very important to me to make the female character three-dimensional".

The three-part series was directed by Craig Viveiros and produced by Betsan Morris Evans. It was executive produced by Viveiros, Damien Timmer, Preethi Mavahalli and Peter Harness from Mammoth Screen; Tommy Bulfin from the BBC; Minglu Ma from Creasun; and Jamie Brown from Red Square.

The interpretation makes use of time-shifting forwards and backwards in the narrative timeline in order to "upend audience expectations".

=== Filming ===
Filming began in April 2018 in Liverpool. Locations include St George's Plateau, Eldon Grove, Vauxhall (where an abandoned building was used as a London location), Sir Thomas Street, Dale Street, Ainsdale Woods, Delamere Forest, the village of Great Budworth in Cheshire, the Palm House at Sefton Park, and Croxteth Hall. Filming and post-production were completed by May 2019.

== Release ==
=== Marketing ===
The first footage from the BBC drama appeared in July 2018, followed by teaser trailers in January 2019, with the first full trailer for the drama being released in September 2019.

=== Broadcast ===
Originally set to premiere in the UK during Christmas 2018, The War of the Worlds actually premiered in Canada on T+E between 6 and 20 October 2019. It was also broadcast in two parts instead of three on New Zealand's TVNZ 1 between 13 and 20 October 2019. Mammoth Screen announced in September 2019 that the programme was expected to be released in the UK in late 2019; the first episode had its UK premiere on 17 November 2019. The three-episode programme was released weekly in the UK.

ITV Studios Global Entertainment is responsible for the international distribution of The War of the Worlds miniseries. It has been sold to major European countries and African territories.

== Critical reception ==
The War of the Worlds has received mixed reviews from critics. The series holds a 68% approval rating on the review aggregator website Rotten Tomatoes, based on 22 critic reviews. The site's consensus reads, "Respectful, if not exactly riveting, Craig Viveiros' reimagined The War of the Worlds wandering narrative undermines its strong performances".

Rebecca Nicholson of The Guardian gave the drama four stars, deeming it a "solid, reliable adaptation" of the source material which remained "thoroughly and entirely respectful" to the novel after the narrative alterations. She praised the score and the presentation of the "scale of the catastrophe", but criticised the plot's pacing – namely its slow start and use of flash-forwards – stating it had a "lack of urgency". Ed Cumming gave it three stars in The Independent, praising the set design and saying the leads do a "reasonable job" of portraying the relationship between their characters, but complained about its attempts to speak to contemporary political issues, stating, "The real war here is not between humans and aliens, but between a classic tale and the perceived liberal expectations of audiences in 2019".

In The Telegraph, Ed Power criticised it for appearing low-budget and for the relationship between the main characters taking precedence over the invasion, which was "presented almost as an afterthought". In other reviews from the paper, Anita Singh had similar thoughts, describing poor-quality visual effects and a lack of terror compared to the original. She said the characters had "understandably" been fleshed-out, but was critical of the "soppy love story" and of Spall's performance, giving the first two episodes two stars and one star respectively.
