= Herbert Lom =

Czech actor (1917–2012)

- Lom in a 1940s publicity photo
- Born: Herbert Charles Angelo Kuchačevič ze Schluderpacheru; 11 September 1917; Prague, Kingdom of Bohemia, Austria-Hungary
- Died: 27 September 2012 (aged 95); Camden Town, London, England
- Citizenship: United Kingdom (after 1947)
- Occupation: Actor
- Years active: 1937–2004
- Spouses: Dina Schea (m. 1948; div. 1979); Eve Lacik (div. 1990)
- Children: 3

Herbert Charles Angelo Kuchačevič ze Schluderpacheru (11 September 1917 – 27 September 2012), known professionally as Herbert Lom (Czech pronunciation: [ɦɛrbɛrt lom]), was a Czech and British actor with a career spanning over 60 years. His cool demeanour and precise, elegant elocution saw him cast as criminals or suave villains in his younger years, and professional men and nobles as he aged. Highly versatile, he was also known to legions of comedy fans as the beleaguered Chief Inspector Charles Dreyfus in the Pink Panther film series.

Lom's other notable films included The Ladykillers (1955), War and Peace (1956), Spartacus (1960), El Cid (1961), Mysterious Island (also 1961), The Phantom of the Opera (1962) and The Dead Zone (1983). He also originated the role of the King of Siam in the original West End production of The King and I, and starred on the 1960s television drama The Human Jungle.

== Early life and education ==
Lom was born in Prague to Karl Kuchačevič ze Schluderpacheru and Olga Gottlieb. His mother was of Jewish ancestry. His ancestor, Christian Schluderpacher, a burgher of Bozen, was ennobled in 1601. Lom's family were comfortable, but not grandly aristocratic. His grandfather owned property in Prague and the Bohemian Forest, with his income deriving mainly from two restaurants and a guest house. Lom's father, as a younger son, inherited little, supporting his family by variously running a printing business, a car repair shop, and trying to establish himself as an art agent. The family lived at various Prague city quarters: Žižkov before moving to Vysočany, subsequently lived at Vinohrady, then New Town, where Lom attended a famous German grammar school. He studied philosophy for some time at the German University in Prague, but ceased his studies to become an actor.

== Career ==
Lom's film debut was in the Czechoslovak film Žena pod křížem ("Woman Under the Cross", 1937) followed by the Boží mlýny ("Mills of God", 1938). His early film appearances were mainly supporting roles, with the occasional top billing. At this time he also changed his surname to Lom ("quarry" or "breakage" in Czech) because it was the shortest he found in a local telephone directory.

Due to the occupation of Czechoslovakia by Nazi Germany, Poland and Hungary in 1938–39, Lom emigrated to Britain in 1939. He made numerous appearances in British films throughout the 1940s, usually in villainous roles, although he later appeared in comedies as well. Despite his mother's Jewish ancestry, Lom's parents survived to join him in England.

He managed to escape being typecast as a European heavy by securing a diverse range of casting, including as Napoleon Bonaparte in The Young Mr. Pitt (1942), and again in the King Vidor version of War and Peace (1956). He secured a seven-picture Hollywood contract after World War II, but was unable to obtain an American visa for "political reasons". In a rare starring role, Lom played twin trapeze artists in Dual Alibi (1946).

He was naturalised as a British citizen in 1947.

Lom starred as the King of Siam in the original London production of Rodgers and Hammerstein's musical The King and I. Opening at the Drury Lane Theatre on 8 October 1953, it ran for 926 performances. He can be heard on the cast recording. A few years later, he appeared opposite Alec Guinness and Peter Sellers in The Ladykillers (1955); and with Robert Mitchum, Jack Lemmon and Rita Hayworth in Fire Down Below (1957). He went on to more film success in the 1960s with a wide range of parts, including Spartacus (1960); El Cid (1961); Mysterious Island (also 1961), as Captain Nemo; and Hammer Films' remake of The Phantom of the Opera (1962), in which Lom had the leading role, wearing a full-face Phantom mask. "It was wonderful to play such a part," he said, "but I was disappointed with the picture... This version of the famous Gaston Leroux story dragged. The Phantom wasn't given enough to do, but at least I wasn't the villain, for a change. Michael Gough was the villain." Lom co-starred, with Shirley MacLaine and Michael Caine, in Gambit (1966).

During this period, Lom starred in his only regular TV series, the British drama The Human Jungle (1963–64), playing a Harley Street psychiatrist for two series. He starred in another low-budget horror film, the witch-hunting story Mark of the Devil (Hexen bis aufs Blut gequält, 1970), with unusually graphic torture scenes. Cinemas reportedly handed out sick bags at screenings. Lom appeared in other horror films made in both the US and UK, including Asylum, And Now the Screaming Starts!, Murders in the Rue Morgue and The Dead Zone.

Lom was perhaps best known for his portrayal of Chief Inspector Charles Dreyfus, Inspector Clouseau's long-suffering superior, in most of Blake Edwards' Pink Panther films, beginning with the second in the series, A Shot in the Dark (1964). He also appeared in two screen versions of the Agatha Christie novel And Then There Were None—as Dr. Armstrong in the 1975 version, and as General Romensky in the 1989 version.

Lom wrote two historical novels: one on the playwright Christopher Marlowe (Enter a Spy: The Double Life of Christopher Marlowe, 1978), and the other on the French Revolution (Dr Guillotine: The Eccentric Exploits of an Early Scientist, 1992). The film rights to the latter have been purchased, but no film has yet been produced.

== Personal life ==
Lom married Diana Scheu in 1948. They had two children before they divorced after separating between 1961 and 1976. He had a child from a relationship with Brigitta Appleby. He later married Eve Lacik; they divorced in 1990.

=== Death ===
Lom died in his sleep at his home in Camden Town, London, on 27 September 2012, at the age of 95.

== Selected filmography ==
- Žena pod křížem (1937) as Gustav, Hodan's son
- Boží mlýny (1938) as Chasník
- The Young Mr. Pitt (1942) as Napoleon
- Secret Mission (1942) as Medical Officer
- Tomorrow We Live (1943) as Kurtz
- The Dark Tower (1943) as Stephen Torg
- Hotel Reserve (1944) as Andre Roux
- The Seventh Veil (1945) as Dr. Larsen
- Night Boat to Dublin (1946) as Keitel
- Appointment with Crime (1946) as Gregory Lang
- Dual Alibi (1947) as Jules de Lisle / Georges de Lisle
- Snowbound (1948) as Keramikos
- Good-Time Girl (1948) as Max Vine
- Brass Monkey (1948) as Peter Hobart
- Portrait from Life (1948) as Fritz Kottler Hendlmann
- The Lost People (1949) as Guest (uncredited)
- Golden Salamander (1950) as Rankl
- Night and the City (1950) as Kristo
- State Secret (1950) as Karl Theodor
- The Black Rose (1950) as Anthemus
- Cage of Gold (1950) as Rahman
- Hell Is Sold Out (1951) as Dominic Danges
- Two on the Tiles (1951) as Ford
- Mr. Denning Drives North (1952) as Mados
- Whispering Smith Hits London (1952) as Roger Ford
- The Ringer (1952) as Maurice Meister
- The Man Who Watched Trains Go By (1952) as Julius de Koster, Jr.
- The Net (1953) as Dr. Alex Leon
- Rough Shoot (1953) as Sandorski
- The Love Lottery (1954) as André Amico
- Star of India (1954) as Vicomte de Narbonne
- Beautiful Stranger (1954) as Emile Landosh
- The Ladykillers (1955) as Louis
- War and Peace (1956) as Napoleon
- Fire Down Below (1957) as Harbour Master
- Hell Drivers (1957) as Gino Rossi
- Action of the Tiger (1957) as Trifon
- Chase a Crooked Shadow (1958) as Police Commissar Vargas
- I Accuse! (1958) as Major du Paty de Clam
- Intent to Kill (1958) as Juan Menda
- The Roots of Heaven (1958) as Orsini
- Passport to Shame (1958) as Nick Biaggi
- No Trees in the Street (1959) as Wilkie
- The Big Fisherman (1959) as Herod Antipas
- North West Frontier (US: Flame Over India, 1959) as Peter van Leyden
- Third Man on the Mountain (1959) as Emil Saxo
- I Aim at the Stars (1960) as Anton Reger
- Spartacus (1960) as Tigranes Levantus (pirate envoy)
- Mr. Topaze (1961) as Castel Benac
- Mysterious Island (1961) as Captain Nemo
- The Frightened City (1961) as Waldo Zhernikov
- El Cid (1961) as Ben Yusuf
- The Phantom of the Opera (1962) as The Phantom
- Tiara Tahiti (1962) as Chong Sing
- Treasure of Silver Lake (1962) as Colonel Brinkley
- The Horse Without a Head (1963, TV film) as Schiapa
- The Human Jungle (1963–1964, TV series, 26 episodes) as Dr. Roger Corder
- A Shot in the Dark (1964) as Police Commissioner Charles Dreyfus
- Uncle Tom's Cabin (1965) as Simon Legree
- Return from the Ashes (1965) as Dr. Charles Bovard
- Our Man in Marrakesh (1966) as Mr. Casimir
- Gambit (1966) as Ahmad Shahbandar
- The Karate Killers (1967) as Randolph
- Die Nibelungen: Kriemhild's Revenge (1967) as King Etzel (Attila)
- Villa Rides (1968) as General Huerta
- Eve (1968) as Diego
- Assignment to Kill (1968) as Matt Wilson
- 99 Women (1969) as Governor Santos
- Doppelgänger (1969) as Dr Kurt Hassler
- Mark of the Devil (1970) as Lord Cumberland
- Mister Jerico (1970, TV film) as Rosso
- Count Dracula (1970) as Van Helsing
- Dorian Gray (1970) as Henry Wotton
- Murders in the Rue Morgue (1971) as René Marot
- Hawaii Five-O ("Highest Castle, Deepest Grave", 1971, TV) as Mondrago
- Asylum (1972) as Dr. Byron (segment: "Mannikins of Horror")
- Dark Places (1972) as Prescott
- And Now the Screaming Starts! (1973) as Sir Henry Fengriffin
- And Then There Were None (1974) as Dr. Edward Armstrong
- The Return of the Pink Panther (1975) as Chief Inspector Charles Dreyfus
- The Pink Panther Strikes Again (1976) as Former Chief Inspector Charles Dreyfus
- Charleston (1977) as Inspector Watkins
- Revenge of the Pink Panther (1978) as Chief Inspector Charles Dreyfus
- The Lady Vanishes (1979) as Dr. Hartz
- The Man with Bogart's Face (1980) as Mr. Zebra
- Hopscotch (1980) as Yaskov
- Peter and Paul (1981) as Barnabas
- I Have Been Here Before by J. B. Priestley 'Play of the Week', BBC (1982) as Dr Görtler
- Trail of the Pink Panther (1982) as Chief Inspector Charles Dreyfus
- Curse of the Pink Panther (1983) as Chief Inspector Charles Dreyfus
- The Dead Zone (1983) as Dr. Sam Weizak
- Lace (1984, TV miniseries) as Monsieur Chardin
- Memed, My Hawk (1984) as Ali Safa Bey
- King Solomon's Mines (1985) as Colonel Bockner
- Scoop (TV film, 1987) as Mr. Baldwin
- Master of Dragonard Hill (1987) as Le Farge
- Going Bananas (1987) as Captain Mackintosh
- Skeleton Coast (1988) as Elia
- Whoops Apocalypse (1988) as General Mosquera
- River of Death (1989) as Colonel Ricardo Diaz
- Masque of the Red Death (1989) as Ludwig
- Ten Little Indians (1989) as General Romensky
- The Devil's Daughter (1991) as Moebius Kelly
- The Pope Must Die (US: The Pope Must Diet!, 1991) as Vittorio Corelli
- Son of the Pink Panther (1993) as Police Commissioner Charles Dreyfus
- Agatha Christie's Marple, episode "Murder at the Vicarage" (2004), as Augustin Dufosse (final role)

== Voice work ==
- "Nemesis" (2007) in Agatha Christie's Marple series, as Jason Rafiel (voice, uncredited)
