= Ghosted (2011 film) =

2011 film by Craig Viveiros

- Film poster
- Directed by: Craig Viveiros
- Starring: John Lynch; David Schofield
- Cinematography: James Friend
- Release date: 24 June 2011
- Running time: 102 minutes
- Country: United Kingdom
- Language: English

Ghosted is a 2011 British drama film directed by Craig Viveiros.

== Cast ==
- John Lynch as Jack
- David Schofield as Donner
- Martin Compston as Paul
- Craig Parkinson as Clay
- Art Malik as Ahmed
- Amanda Abbington as Tracy
- Hugh Quarshie as Ade
- Neil Maskell as Nathan
