= Masque of the Red Death (1989 Alan Birkinshaw film) =

1989 film directed by Alan Birkinshaw

- Directed by: Alan Birkinshaw
- Screenplay by: Michael J. Murray
- Based on: The Masque of the Red Death; 1842 story by Edgar Allan Poe
- Produced by: Avi Lerner; Harry Alan Towers
- Starring: Frank Stallone; Brenda Vaccaro; Herbert Lom
- Cinematography: Yossi Wein
- Edited by: Jason Krasucki
- Music by: Kobi Recht
- Production company: 21st Century Film Corporation
- Distributed by: 21st Century Film Corporation
- Release date: November 9, 1989
- Running time: 94 minutes
- Language: English

The Masque of the Red Death was a 1989 film directed by Alan Birkinshaw, starring Frank Stallone, Brenda Vaccaro and Herbert Lom, produced by Avi Lerner and Harry Alan Towers for Menahem Golan's 21st Century Film Corporation, from a script by Michael J. Murray. It was one of two otherwise unrelated films with the same title released that year.

The film is a slasher movie set in the 1980s, with little to do with Poe's work other than being set at a costume party themed after Poe's short story of the same name, and a reference to "The Pit and the Pendulum". In Touchstones of Gothic Horror, David Huckvale states that the film may have been influenced by the short story "Duke of Portland" by Auguste de Villiers de L'Isle-Adam.

== Cast ==
- Frank Stallone as Duke
- Brenda Vaccaro as Elaina Hart
- Herbert Lom as Ludwig
- Michelle McBride as Rebecca Stephens
- Christine Lunde as Colette (credited as Christine Lundé)
- Christobel d'Ortez as Dr. Karen
- Simon Poland as Max
- Foziah Davidson as Kitra
- Lindsay Reardon as Dallon
