= Craig Viveiros =

British-Portuguese film and television director

- Viveiros setting up the immersive production of Nothing in 2024
- Occupations: Film and television director, screenwriter, producer and visual artist
- Known for: And Then There Were None, Rillington Place, The War of the Worlds, Breathtaking
- Website: www.craigviveiros.com

Craig Viveiros is a British-Portuguese film and television director, screenwriter, producer and visual artist. His work includes the BBC dramas And Then There Were None, Rillington Place and The War of the Worlds, the BBC America series The Watch, the ITV thriller Angela Black and the ITV medical drama Breathtaking.

His feature-film debut, Ghosted, which he wrote, directed and produced, had its world premiere at the Edinburgh International Film Festival in 2011. It was subsequently selected for the main competition at the Torino Film Festival, where Martin Compston won Best Actor for his performance in the film.

Alongside his film and television career, Viveiros has also worked in theatre, performance and installation art through the multidisciplinary project 5iveFs.

== Career ==
=== Early career and film ===
Viveiros began his career working in camera and lighting departments before moving into directing short films and commercials.

He wrote, produced and directed his feature-film debut, the prison drama Ghosted (2011), starring John Lynch, Martin Compston, David Schofield, Craig Parkinson and Art Malik. The film had its world premiere at the Edinburgh International Film Festival and later competed at the Torino Film Festival, where Compston received the festival's Best Actor award.

Viveiros subsequently directed the crime thriller The Liability (2012), starring Tim Roth, Jack O'Connell, Peter Mullan and Talulah Riley. The film was selected for the Torino 30 international feature competition at the 2012 Torino Film Festival.

=== Television ===
In 2015, Viveiros directed all three episodes of the BBC One adaptation of Agatha Christie's And Then There Were None, starring Charles Dance, Sam Neill, Aidan Turner, Toby Stephens, Miranda Richardson, Anna Maxwell Martin and Maeve Dermody.

The three-part adaptation was a ratings success for BBC One. Its opening episode attracted approximately six million viewers on Boxing Day in the UK.

The production also received positive critical attention for its dark and cinematic treatment of Christie's novel. The Times described it as "the best Christie adaptation yet made for television". The Irish Independent singled out Viveiros's "assured and stylish direction" and compared the production's quality to that of a three-hour cinema film. RogerEbert.com similarly praised Viveiros's "assured direction", while The Independent described the adaptation as "smart" and "sharp", its conclusion as "riveting", and the production as "hugely atmospheric".

For his work on the series, Viveiros was nominated for Director - Drama at the 2016 Royal Television Society Craft & Design Awards.

Viveiros subsequently directed all three episodes of the BBC One drama Rillington Place (2016), based on the crimes of John Christie and starring Tim Roth, Samantha Morton, Nico Mirallegro and Jodie Comer.

The production received two nominations at the 2017 British Academy Television Craft Awards. Cinematographer James Friend won Photography & Lighting: Fiction, while Pat Campbell was nominated for Production Design. Friend's cinematography on Rillington Place also received a British Society of Cinematographers nomination, and the series was nominated for the Satellite Award for Best Miniseries.

In 2017, Viveiros worked again with Tim Roth, directing the Tin Star episode "Fortunate Boy".

He later directed all three episodes of the BBC's adaptation of H. G. Wells's The War of the Worlds, starring Rafe Spall, Eleanor Tomlinson, Rupert Graves and Robert Carlyle. Viveiros also served as an executive producer on the production.

Viveiros subsequently worked as a director and executive producer on BBC America's The Watch, a television series inspired by characters from Terry Pratchett's Discworld novels.

In 2021, he directed all six episodes of the ITV and Spectrum Originals psychological thriller Angela Black, starring Joanne Froggatt, Michiel Huisman and Samuel Adewunmi. He also served as an executive producer on the series.

=== Breathtaking ===
In 2024, Viveiros directed all three episodes of Breathtaking, an ITV medical drama based on physician Rachel Clarke's memoir about the experiences of NHS staff during the COVID-19 pandemic in the United Kingdom. The series was written by Clarke, Jed Mercurio and Prasanna Puwanarajah and starred Joanne Froggatt as hospital consultant Abbey Henderson.

Viveiros developed an immersive, observational approach to the production. Scenes were frequently staged in extended moving-camera sequences, with parts of the hospital environment operating continuously around the actors. Viveiros described his intention as creating a fluid, real-time approach in which the camera could move throughout a 360-degree environment rather than relying on conventional marks and coverage.

The series received strong critical reviews. The Standard described it as "compulsory viewing". The Independent specifically praised Viveiros's direction, writing that his use of long moving-camera sequences lifted the drama above familiar medical-drama conventions and immersed viewers in the hospital environment. The newspaper later included Breathtaking among its best television programmes of 2024.

In 2025, Breathtaking was nominated in the Limited Series and Single Drama category at the Royal Television Society Programme Awards. Production designer Ashleigh Jeffers was also nominated for Production Design at the 2025 British Academy Television Craft Awards.

== Theatre, performance and installation art ==
Alongside his film and television work, Viveiros founded 5iveFs, a collaborative project working across film, theatre, music, performance and visual art.

In March 2024, Viveiros directed a new production of Lulu Raczka's play Nothing at Galeria Zé dos Bois in Lisbon. Presented by 5iveFs, the production featured Helena Caldeira, Samuel Adewunmi, Edgar Morais, David J. Amado, Paul Tracey, Chelsea Sheets and Sofi Pashkual, with music by British electronic musician Batu.

Later in 2024, Viveiros created AXIS, an immersive film and performance installation presented through 5iveFs at Mirari in Lisbon. The work combined filmed performance, projection, sculpture and electronic music, and included performances by Richard Dormer, Lara Rossi, Helena Caldeira and Edgar Morais, with a soundscape by Al Wootton.

== Selected filmography ==
Year	Title	Medium	Role
2011	Ghosted	Film	Writer, director and producer
2012	The Liability	Film	Director
2013	Endeavour	Television	Director, episode "Rocket"
2014-2015	Silent Witness	Television	Director, four episodes
2015	X Company	Television	Director, two episodes
2015	And Then There Were None	Television miniseries	Director, three episodes
2016	Rillington Place	Television miniseries	Director, three episodes
2017	Tin Star	Television	Director, episode "Fortunate Boy"
2019	The War of the Worlds	Television miniseries	Director and executive producer, three episodes
2021	The Watch	Television	Director and executive producer
2021	Angela Black	Television	Director and executive producer, six episodes
2024	Breathtaking	Television miniseries	Director, three episodes

=== Theatre and installation ===
Year	Title	Type	Role
2024	Nothing	Theatre	Director - 5iveFs / Galeria Zé dos Bois, Lisbon
2024	AXIS	Film/performance installation	Creator, writer, director and producer
