= And Then There Were None (TV series) =

2015 British television series

- Title card
- Genre: Mystery; Drama; Thriller
- Based on: And Then There Were None by Agatha Christie
- Written by: Sarah Phelps
- Directed by: Craig Viveiros
- Starring: Douglas Booth; Charles Dance; Maeve Dermody; Burn Gorman; Anna Maxwell Martin; Sam Neill; Miranda Richardson; Toby Stephens; Noah Taylor; Aidan Turner
- Composer: Stuart Earl
- Country of origin: United Kingdom
- Original language: English
- No. of episodes: 3

Production
- Executive producers: Mathew Pritchard; Hilary Strong; Karen Thrussell; Damien Timmer; Matthew Read; Sarah Phelps
- Producer: Abi Bach
- Cinematography: John Pardue
- Running time: 180 minutes
- Production companies: Mammoth Screen; Agatha Christie Productions; Acorn Productions; A&E Networks

Original release
- Network: BBC One; BBC One HD
- Release: 26 December – 28 December 2015

And Then There Were None is a 2015 mystery thriller television series that was first broadcast on BBC One from 26 to 28 December 2015. The three-part programme was adapted by Sarah Phelps and directed by Craig Viveiros and is based on Agatha Christie's 1939 novel of the same name. The series features an ensemble cast, including Douglas Booth, Charles Dance, Maeve Dermody, Burn Gorman, Anna Maxwell Martin, Sam Neill, Miranda Richardson, Toby Stephens, Noah Taylor, and Aidan Turner. The programme follows a group of strangers who are invited to an isolated island where they are murdered one by one for their past crimes.

The drama, debuting to 6 million viewers, received critical acclaim with many praising the writing, performances, and cinematography. It also scored high ratings.

== Synopsis ==
In late August 1939, eight individuals previously unknown to each other arrive on Soldier Island, a fictional, isolated island situated off the coast of Devon, England. They have been invited under various pretexts by a "Mr and Mrs Owen".

Upon arrival at the island’s house, the guests discover that their hosts are absent, and they are welcomed by the recently hired caretakers, Thomas and Ethel Rogers. At dinner, the guests observe a table centrepiece comprising ten stylised Art Deco figurines, apparently representing ten soldiers.

After the meal, a gramophone recording is played and an anonymous voice accuses each person present of having committed a murder. Soon afterwards, one of the guests dies from poisoning, followed by a series of further deaths. Each murder mirrors a line from a rhyme displayed in the bedrooms; and with every death, a figurine is removed from the centrepiece.

== Cast ==
=== Main ===
- Douglas Booth as Anthony James Marston, a socialite charged with killing two children by reckless driving.
- Charles Dance as Justice Lawrence John Wargrave, a judge charged with sentencing an innocent man to death.
- Maeve Dermody as Vera Elizabeth Claythorne, a former governess charged with intentionally allowing her ward to drown.
- Burn Gorman as Detective Sergeant William Henry Blore, a police officer charged with murdering a suspect in his custody.
- Anna Maxwell Martin as Ethel Rogers, a cook charged with allowing her husband to murder their former employer.
- Sam Neill as General John Gordon MacArthur, an army general charged with murdering his wife's lover.
- Miranda Richardson as Emily Caroline Brent, a religious spinster charged with causing the suicide of her former maid.
- Toby Stephens as Doctor Edward George Armstrong, a surgeon charged with killing a patient by being drunk during surgery.
- Noah Taylor as Thomas Rogers, a butler charged with murdering his and his wife's former employer.
- Aidan Turner as Philip Lombard, a mercenary charged with murdering 21 African men.

=== Featured in flashbacks ===
- Harley Gallacher as Cyril Ogilvie-Hamilton
- Catherine Bailey as Olivia Ogilvie-Hamilton
- Rob Heaps as Hugo Hamilton
- Paul Chahidi as Isaac Morris
- Charlie Russell as Audrey
- Christopher Hatherall as Fred Narracott
- Richard Hansell as The Recording Artist
- Joseph Prowen as Edward Seton
- Ben Deery as Henry Richmond
- Margot Edwards as Miss Brady
- Celia Henebury as Leslie MacArthur
- Tom Clegg as Landor
- Daisy Waterstone as Beatrice

== Production ==
=== Conception ===
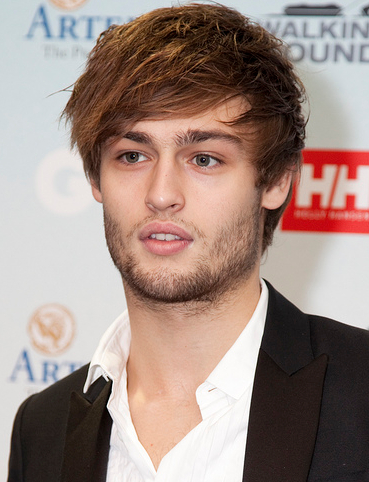
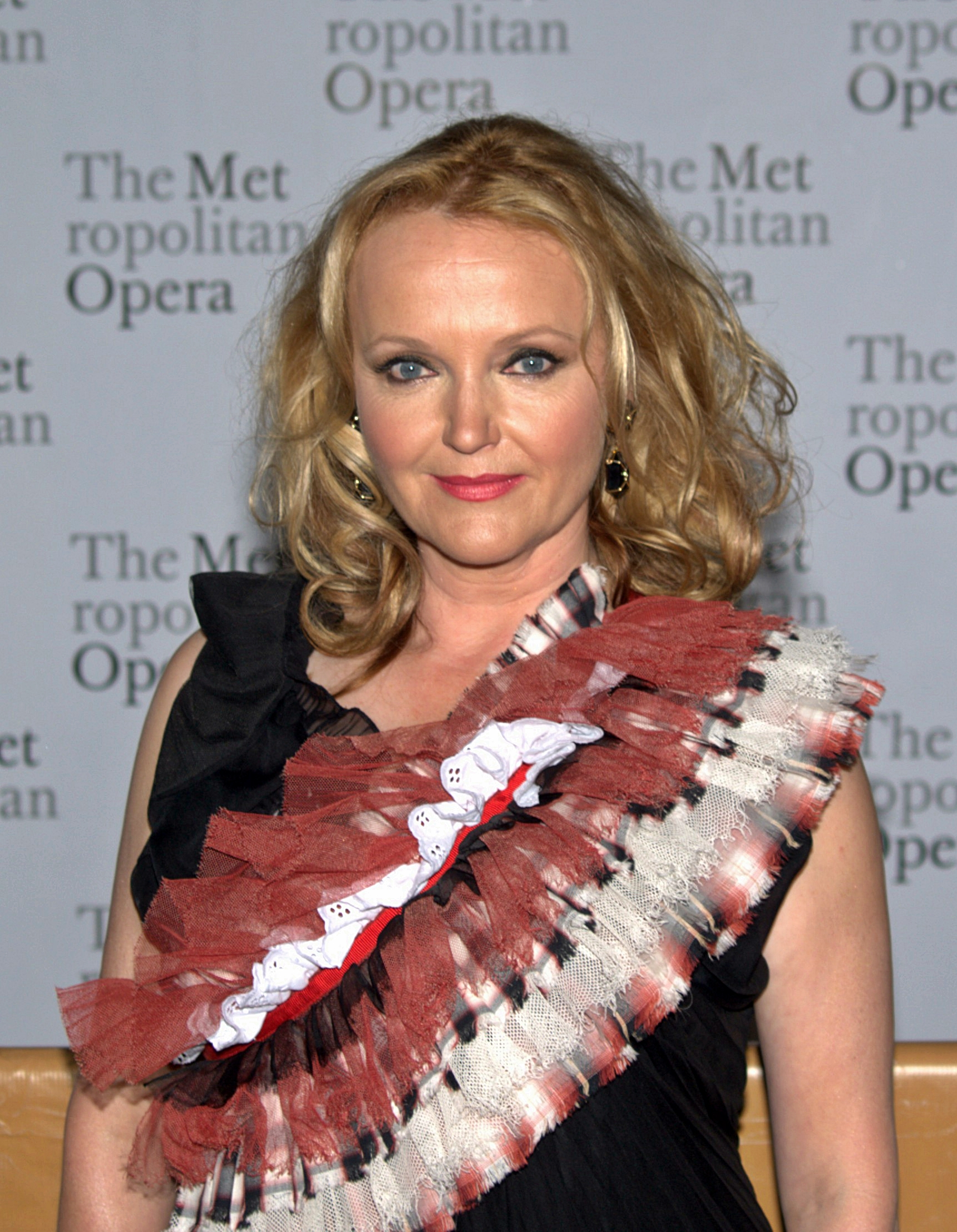
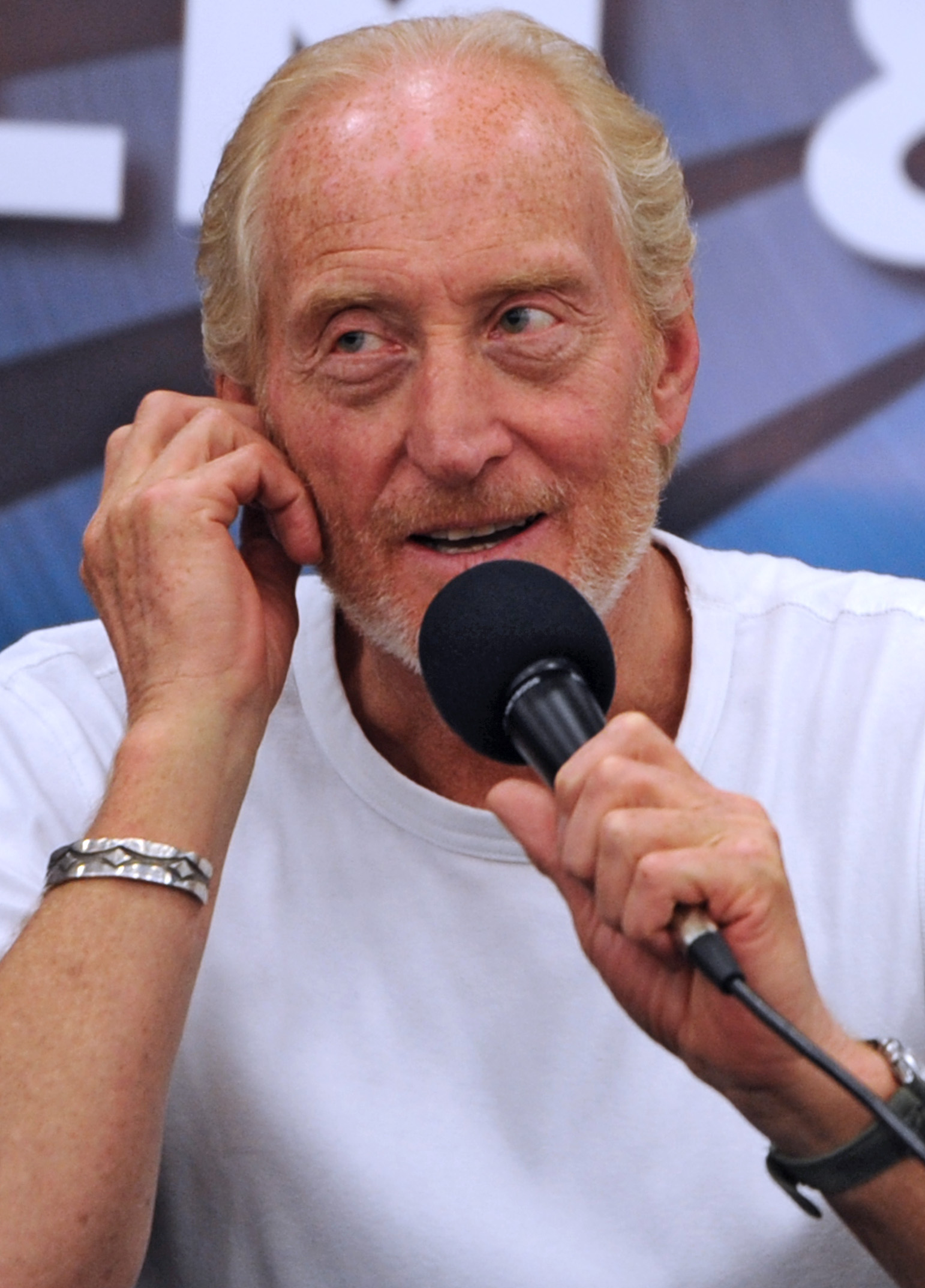
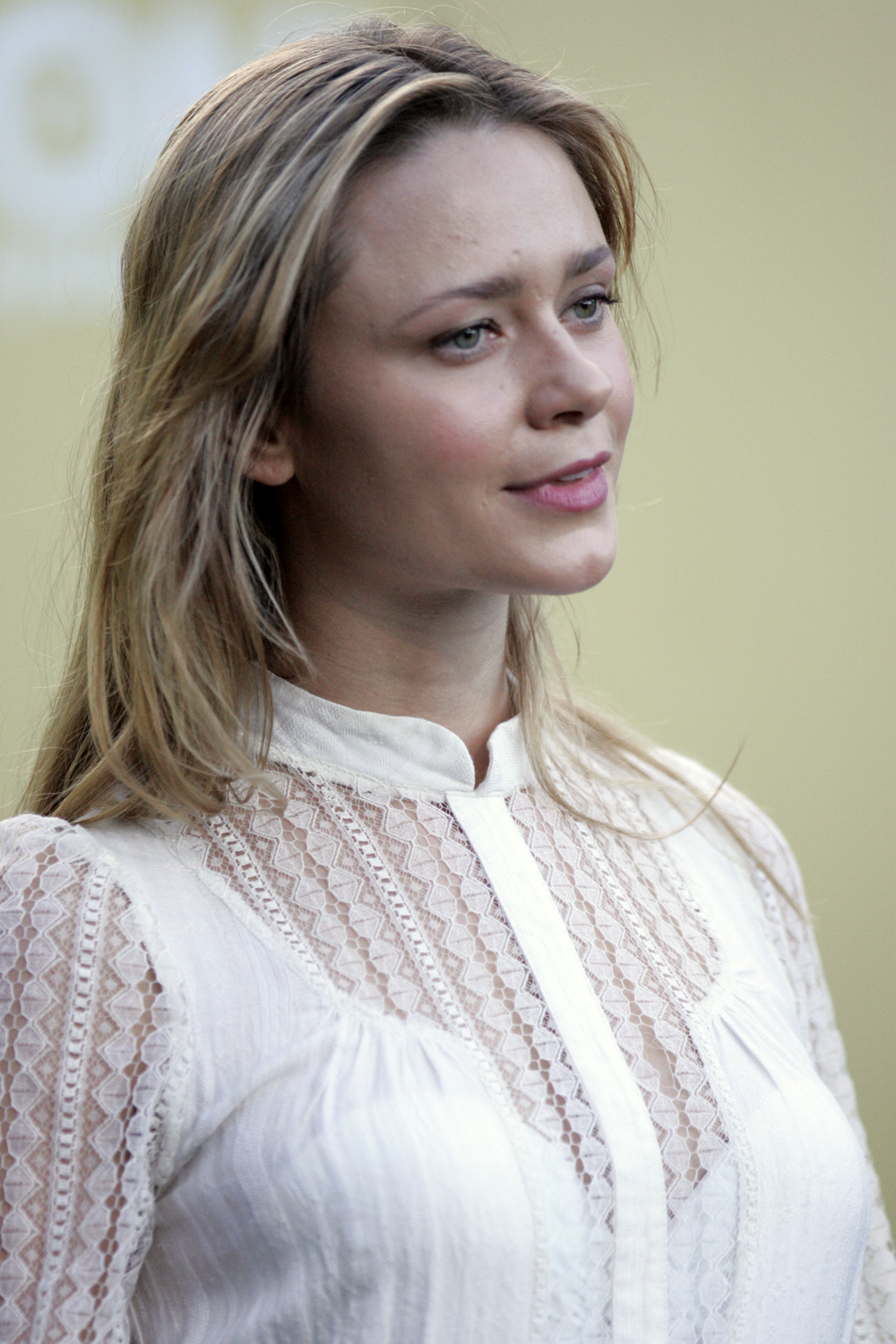
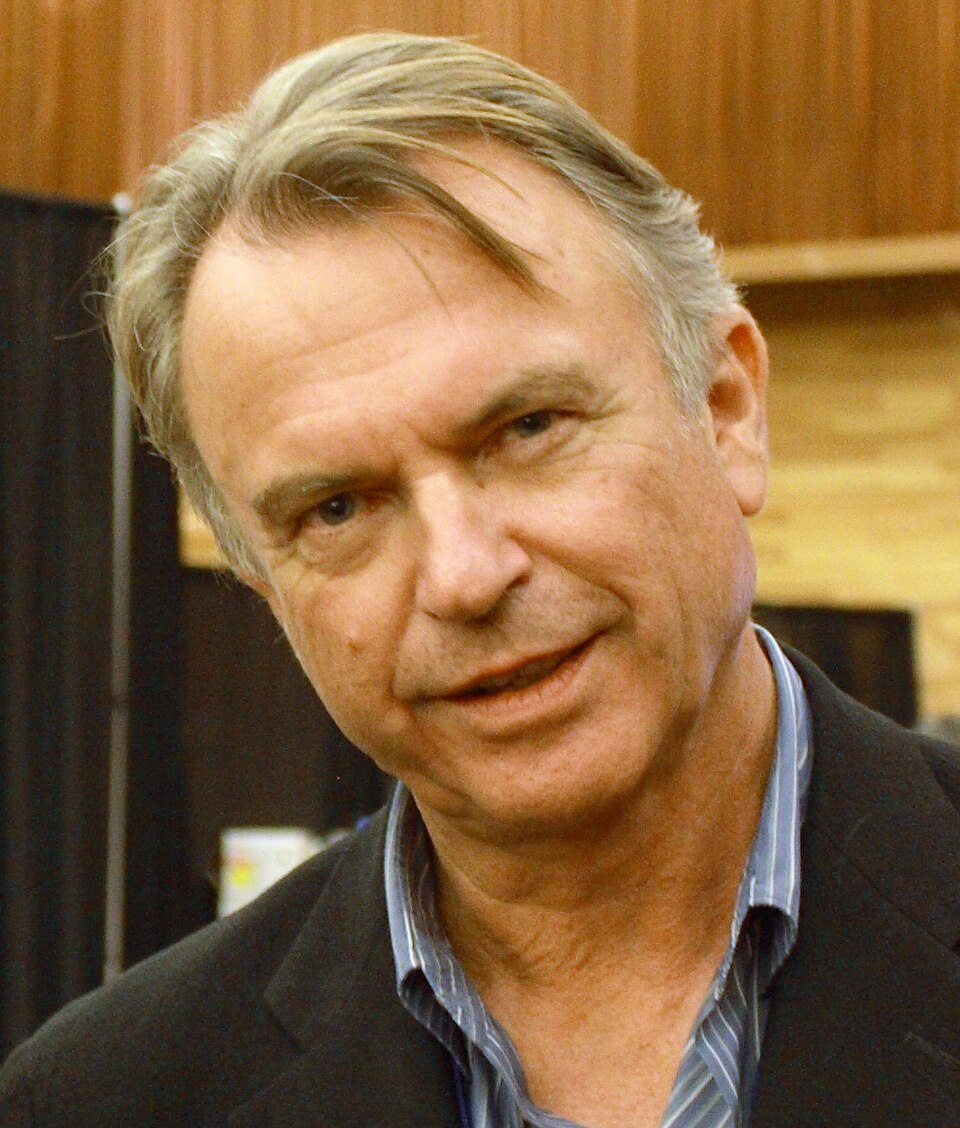
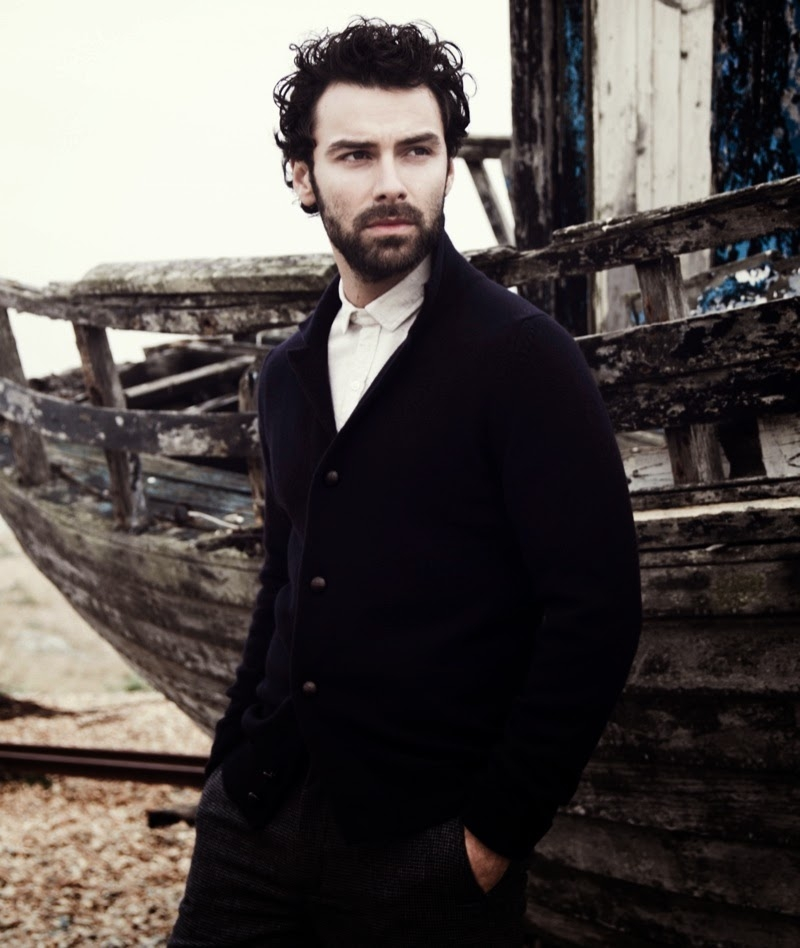
(From top to bottom, left to right), Douglas Booth, Miranda Richardson, Charles Dance, Maeve Dermody, Sam Neill and Aidan Turner.

And Then There Were None was commissioned by Ben Stephenson and Charlotte Moore for the BBC to mark the 125th anniversary of Agatha Christie's birth. The adaptation was produced by Mammoth Screen in partnership with Agatha Christie Productions.

Writer Sarah Phelps told the BBC that she was shocked by the starkness and brutality of the novel. Comparing the novel to Christie's other work, she stated, "Within the Marple and Poirot stories somebody is there to unravel the mystery, and that gives you a sense of safety and security, of predicting what is going to happen next... In this book that doesn't happen – no one is going to come to save you, absolutely nobody is coming to help or rescue or interpret."

=== Casting ===
Maeve Dermody was cast two days before the read through of the script and was in Myanmar at the time. She flew to the UK to begin work with a dialect coach and read the book in the first two weeks of filming.

=== Filming ===
Filming began in July 2015. Cornwall was used for many of the harbour and beach scenes, including Holywell Bay, Kynance Cove, and Mullion Cove. Harefield House in Hillingdon, outside London, served as the location for the island mansion. Production designer Sophie Beccher decorated the house in the style of 1930s designers like Syrie Maugham and Elsie de Wolfe. The below stairs and kitchen scenes were shot at Wrotham Park in Hertfordshire. Railway scenes were filmed at the South Devon Railway between Totnes and Buckfastleigh.

== Episodes ==
No.	Title	Directed by	Written by	Original release date	UK viewers (millions)
1	"Episode 1"	Craig Viveiros	Sarah Phelps	26 December 2015	9.56 (Note: 28 day data)
In August 1939, eight strangers arrive at Soldier Island having ostensibly been invited by old friends or by the Island's owners, Mr and Mrs Owen. There is no host to greet them but there are domestic staff, Mr and Mrs Rogers. The guests find a copy of a rhyme, "Ten Little Soldier Boys", in each of their rooms and ten jade figurines on the table. Eight guests deny the accusations made against them, but Lombard and Marston do not. Marston dies shortly afterwards from cyanide-laced gin in a similar manner to that of the first little soldier. The next morning, Mrs Rogers is found dead in her bed, matching the second verse of the rhyme. Two of the soldiers in the dining room have disappeared.
2	"Episode 2"	Craig Viveiros	Sarah Phelps	27 December 2015	8.45
The apparent poisoning of both victims casts suspicion on Dr Armstrong, whose medical bag is searched without anything suspicious being found. As a hunt for the mysterious Mr Owen is conducted on the island, the stories behind the accusations begin to come to light: Lombard admits that he killed 21 Africans for diamonds; Emily Brent recounts the fateful past of her former maid, Beatrice Taylor; and General MacArthur is crippled with guilt over having killed his subordinate, his wife's lover Henry Richmond. After the General is found with his head smashed in by a telescope, the remaining seven realize that whoever left the mysterious message intends to kill them all, according to the verses of the rhyme. Judge Wargrave suggests that the killer must be one of them. Mr Rogers is found dead after being attacked with an axe; and Emily Brent is found fatally stabbed in the neck. The five survivors band together to search the house.
3	"Episode 3"	Craig Viveiros	Sarah Phelps	28 December 2015	8.33
Judge Wargrave is found with a gunshot wound to the head, dressed to match the Chancery verse of the rhyme, and is declared dead by Dr Armstrong. The remaining four engage in a bacchanal with alcohol and drugs, and Vera Claythorne and Lombard have sex. During the night, Dr Armstrong leaves the house and disappears, leading the others to believe that he must be the killer. Blore is found fatally stabbed in a hallway, his body partly covered with a bearskin rug. When Dr Armstrong's corpse is washed ashore, Claythorne concludes that the killer must be Lombard, the last person remaining. She grabs his gun and shoots him dead. Deliriously remembering her own culpability in persuading her young ward to swim, then leaving him to drown, she returns to her room where she finds a noose waiting. In a trance, Claythorne starts to hang herself. At this point, Judge Wargrave reappears, alive, and reveals that his own death had been staged with the help of the credulous Dr Armstrong. Wargrave, who is terminally ill, had devised a scheme to administer justice to those who had escaped punishment. He explains that he will shoot himself in the manner described by the rhyme. Claythorne tries to bargain with him but he pulls the chair out from under her. Wargrave returns to the dining room, where he has set the table for two. He loads the revolver and shoots himself. The revolver recoils to land at the other table setting, creating the illusion of another person having carried out the shooting.

== Reception ==
And Then There Were None received critical acclaim and was a ratings success for the BBC, with the first episode netting over 6 million viewers and becoming the second most watched programme on Boxing Day. Each of the two subsequent episodes netted over 5 million viewers.

On review aggregator Rotten Tomatoes, And Then There Were None has an approval rating of 86% based on 13 reviews, with an average rating of 7.5/10. The site's critics' consensus reads: "Dark yet dashingly executed, And Then There Were None offers a brazenly misanthropic look at human nature."

Ben Dowell of the Radio Times gave a positive review. Jasper Reese for The Daily Telegraph gave the first episode 4 out of 5 stars, calling it a "pitch-black psychological thriller as teasing murder mystery" and "spiffingly watchable".

Reviewing the first episode, UK daily newspaper The Guardian's Sam Wollaston noted, "[...] it also manages to be loyal, not just in plot but in spirit as well. I think the queen of crime would approve. I certainly do. Mass murder rarely gets as fun as this." Reviewing the final episode for The Daily Telegraph, Tim Martin gave it 4 out of 5 stars, calling it a "class act", and praising the adaptation for highlighting the darkness of Christie's novel, which he claimed no previous adaptation had attempted.

== Subsequent series ==
And Then There Were None was the first in a series of Christie adaptations scripted by Sarah Phelps for the BBC. The further instalments consisted of: The Witness for the Prosecution (2016), Ordeal by Innocence (2018), The ABC Murders (2018) and The Pale Horse (2020).

== See also ==
- And Then There Were None (disambiguation)
