= Ayton Whitaker =

- Birth name: Ayton Richardson Whitaker
- Born: May 26, 1916 Maidenhead, Berkshire, England
- Died: August 1999 (aged 82–83)
- Allegiance: United Kingdom
- Branch: Royal Air Force
- Conflicts: Second World War

Ayton Richardson Whitaker (26 May 1916 – August 1999) was a British producer and director of radio, film and television for the BBC.

== Life ==
Whitaker was born 26 May 1916, in Maidenhead, Berkshire. During the Second World War he was an officer in the Royal Air Force, being captured and spending time as a Prisoner of War in Stalag Luft III.

== Work ==
From 1945 he was a producer for radio programmes on the BBC Home Service and the Light Programme. These included Mrs Dale's Diary and Dick Barton Special Agent. From 1953 he also began producing television drama. In 1956 he adapted and produced Blithe Spirit by Noël Coward for the radio, but from then on concentrated on producing and directing for television.

He was involved in the creation of the Doctor Who series.
