= Rillington Place =

2016 BBC television miniseries

- Genre: Biographical; Crime drama
- Written by: Ed Whitmore; Tracey Malon
- Directed by: Craig Viveiros
- Starring: Tim Roth; Samantha Morton; Nico Mirallegro; Jodie Comer
- Country of origin: United Kingdom
- Original language: English
- No. of series: 1
- No. of episodes: 3

Production
- Executive producers: Phillippa Giles; Hilary Salmon; Elizabeth Kilgarriff
- Producer: Sharon Bloom
- Production locations: London, England; Glasgow, Scotland; Paisley, Scotland; Dumbarton, Scotland
- Cinematography: James Friend
- Editor: Sam White
- Running time: 58 minutes
- Production companies: BBC; Bandit Television

Original release
- Network: BBC One
- Release: 29 November – 13 December 2016

Rillington Place is a three-part biographical crime drama about the real life case of serial killer John Christie, and the subsequent wrongful execution of Timothy Evans. It premiered on 29 November 2016 on BBC One.

== Premise ==
The miniseries revolves around the home life of John Christie and his wife, Ethel, as he commits a string of murders during the 1940s and early 1950s. Each of the three episodes tells the story as seen from the respective point of view of the three main characters: Ethel Christie, Timothy Evans and John Christie.

== Cast ==
- Tim Roth as John Christie
- Samantha Morton as Ethel Christie
- Nico Mirallegro as Timothy Evans
- Jodie Comer as Beryl Evans

== Production ==
As Rillington Place no longer exists (it was demolished in the early 1970s) the interiors of 10 Rillington Place were recreated at BBC Scotland’s Dumbarton Studios near Glasgow, whilst the exteriors of the street were shot on a set created in a parking lot at the same studio, though the exterior set of Rillington Place is scaled down with just eight houses recreated, (four on one side of the street and four on the other).

Other locations across Scotland were used to represent London. The Bo'ness and Kinneil Railway for the railway station and train, New Street in Paisley, West Princes Street and West Street in Glasgow, representing the link between Rillington Place and the rest of Ladbroke Grove in London. Filming also made use of the Western Baths Club. The Ballantine Castings Factory in Bo'ness was used for the bombed-out section of the factory at the end of Rillington Place.

== Broadcast ==
On 29 November 2016, the first episode premiered on BBC One. Internationally, the series premiered on BBC First on 8 February 2017.

== Reception ==
The series got largely positive reviews from critics, who applauded the performances and the storytelling. Lucy Mangan of The Guardian remarked, "The sheer menace of the thing is extraordinary. The interiors are tiny, dark, oppressive. The script is minimal, elliptical... Obviously it is a tale that has been told many times before. But the limning of the manipulation, the entrapment, the complicity without blame, the forced compromises, and the black misery spreading from one man’s evil has surely rarely been better done." Sally Newall in The Independent praised Roth, Morton and the direction. However, it also attracted mixed reactions from some viewers who complained about the "mumbling" and the "inaudible dialogue" of the actors.

Following the second episode on 6 December, Sarah Doran of RadioTimes.com noted that several viewers had been confused by Mirallegro's use of two different accents while portraying Evans, as the actor switched between Cockney and Welsh accents. However, writers Ed Whitmore and Tracey Malon told the website this had been deliberate, since it was a trait adopted by Evans himself in an attempt to fit into his surroundings: "Tim moved to London from Wales around the age of 11, his half-sister told us he was very keen to fit in and soon adopted a London 'barrow-boy' accent, but that he could slip back into his childhood accent when around members of his Welsh family. Nico [Mirallegro] wanted to reflect Tim's malleability and that desire to fit in by using different accents according to who he was talking to."
