= And Then There Were None =

1939 mystery novel by Agatha Christie

- Cover of first US edition (1940)
- Author: Agatha Christie
- Original title: Ten Little Niggers
- Language: English
- Genre: Mystery; crime; psychological thriller
- Publisher: Collins Crime Club
- Publication date: 6 November 1939
- Publication place: United Kingdom
- Pages: 272
- Website: And Then There Were None

And Then There Were None is a 1939 mystery novel by the English writer Agatha Christie. It is the world's best-selling mystery novel and one of the best-selling books of all time, with more than 100 million copies sold by 2007. It has been adapted for film, television, radio, theatre, and other media more often than any other of Christie's works. In 2015, it was named the "World's Favourite Christie" in a global vote organised by the author's estate.

The story takes place on an isolated island off the coast of Devon. Ten individuals are accused of past crimes and are killed one by one according to the lines of a popular rhyme. Christie described the book as the most difficult of her novels to write because of the complexity of the plot and its solution, and regarded it as a better piece of craftsmanship than anything else she had written.

The novel received largely positive reviews on first publication, with critics praising the ingenuity of its plot, and it has since been frequently named among the greatest crime novels ever written. In 1990 the Crime Writers' Association ranked it nineteenth on its list of the best crime novels, and in 1995 the Mystery Writers of America placed it tenth on a comparable list.

The book was first published in the United Kingdom by Collins Crime Club in 1939 as Ten Little Niggers, after an 1869 minstrel song that forms the central element of the plot. It appeared in the UK under that title until 1985. The first American edition, published in 1940, was called And Then There Were None from the start, as the original was considered unacceptably racially loaded in the United States; the book was also issued there as Ten Little Indians between 1964 and 1986. Later editions in both countries revised the text and the rhyme to remove the original racial language, and the novel is now published in English only as And Then There Were None.

== Plot ==
Eight people are invited to a small, isolated island off the Devon coast. They are met by the butler and housekeeper, Thomas and Ethel Rogers, who explain that their hosts, Mr and Mrs U.N. Owen, have not yet arrived. A framed copy of an old rhyme hangs in every guest's room, and on the dining room table sit ten figurines. Acting on written instructions, Mr Rogers puts on a gramophone record, which accuses each person present of being culpable for a death. The group realise that none of them know the Owens. Anthony Marston finishes his drink and promptly dies from cyanide poisoning.

Next morning, Mrs Rogers is found dead in her bed. Suspecting their unknown host, some of the guests search the island, but find nobody else. After General MacArthur dies from a blow to the head, the guests conclude that one of the seven remaining persons must be responsible. The following day, Mr Rogers is found dead at the woodpile, having been attacked with an axe, and Emily Brent is found dead in the drawing room, having been sedated and then injected with potassium cyanide. The guests realise that one figurine in the dining room is being removed after each death, and that the manner of the deaths corresponds with the wording of the rhyme.

Mr Justice Wargrave, a recently retired judge, suggests that all drugs and firearms should be secured, and that everyone should submit to a search. Philip Lombard's gun cannot be found. Vera Claythorne goes up to her room and screams when she finds seaweed hanging from the ceiling. Most of the remaining guests rush upstairs; when they return they find Wargrave in his chair, wearing what looks like a judicial wig and scarlet robes. Dr Armstrong pronounces him dead from a gunshot wound to the forehead. That night, Lombard's gun is returned, William Blore sees someone leaving the house, and Armstrong mysteriously disappears.

After breakfast next morning, Vera, Lombard, and Blore go out. When Blore returns for food, he is killed by a bear-shaped marble clock that falls from Vera's window sill. Vera and Lombard find Armstrong's drowned body washed up on the beach; it seems as though they are the only two left alive. Vera distracts Lombard, then grabs his gun and shoots and kills him. She returns to her room, and finds that a noose and chair have been set up. Her mind wandering, and believing that her former love is watching, she hangs herself in accordance with the last line of the rhyme.

Scotland Yard officials arrive to find ten bodies. They discover that a sleazy agent named Isaac Morris had purchased the island and made the arrangements on behalf of an unknown buyer; he had subsequently died from an overdose of barbiturates. From the victims' diaries, the police reconstruct the first six deaths. They deduce that neither Armstrong, Lombard, nor Vera could have been the last person alive, as objects had been moved after their deaths, and they consider Blore's death unlikely to have been suicide. It seems no one else was on the island during this time, leaving the police mystified.

A message in a bottle is recovered from the sea, containing a written confession by Wargrave. It explains that from an early age he had a strong sense of justice but also a lust to kill, contradictory traits that led him to become a judge. He derived satisfaction from sentencing criminals to death, but increasingly yearned to actually commit murder. Inspired by a conversation about murders which could never be proven, he located ten individuals who had caused someone's death but not faced justice. He lured nine of them onto the island, hiring Morris to make the arrangements then tricking him into overdosing. Posing as one of the guests, Wargrave killed the others one by one. He persuaded the gullible Dr Armstrong to help him fake his own death as part of a fictitious scheme to uncover the killer. After all the others were dead, Wargrave shot himself, making sure that his true death matched his staged death recorded in the guests' diaries, leaving "ten dead bodies and an unsolved problem".

== Principal characters ==
- Edward George Armstrong – a Harley Street doctor
- William Henry Blore – a former police inspector, now a private investigator
- Emily Caroline Brent – an elderly, pious spinster
- Vera Elizabeth Claythorne – a sports mistress at a girls' school and former governess
- Philip Lombard – a soldier of fortune
- John Gordon Macarthur – a retired World War I general
- Anthony James Marston – a wealthy and irresponsible young man
- Ethel Rogers – the cook and housekeeper, and Thomas Rogers's wife
- Thomas Rogers – the butler and Ethel Rogers's husband
- Lawrence John Wargrave (Mr Justice Wargrave) – a retired criminal judge

== Original rhyme ==
The plot is structured around the ten lines of the rhyme "Ten Little Niggers", a popular 1869 minstrel song written for the Christy's Minstrels by the British songwriter Frank Green. Green had modelled his lyrics on an American comic song "Ten Little Indians" [or Injuns] by Septimus Winner that had been published the year before. In later editions of the novel, the characters of the rhyme are replaced by "Ten Little Indians" or "Ten Little Soldier Boys".

This is the rhyme as published in a British 2008 edition:

Ten little soldier boys went out to dine; One choked his little self and then there were nine.
Nine little soldier boys sat up very late; One overslept himself and then there were eight.
Eight little soldier boys travelling in Devon; One said he'd stay there and then there were seven.
Seven little soldier boys chopping up sticks; One chopped himself in halves and then there were six.
Six little soldier boys playing with a hive; A bumblebee stung one and then there were five.
Five little soldier boys going in for law; One got in Chancery and then there were four.
Four little soldier boys going out to sea; A red herring swallowed one and then there were three.
Three little soldier boys walking in the zoo; A big bear hugged one and then there were two.
Two little soldier boys sitting in the sun; One got frizzled up and then there was one.
One little soldier boy left all alone; He went out and hanged himself and then there were none.

Each of the ten main characters is killed on the island in a manner that reflects one of the lines of the rhyme. An additional victim, Isaac Morris, dies on the mainland outside of the main storyline.

=== Correspondence between the rhyme and the deaths ===
Modes of death of the victims vs the wording of the rhyme
No.	Character	Accusation	Mode of death	Rhyme
–	Isaac Morris	Sold illegal drugs to a woman who became an addict and later died by suicide	Tricked into taking a lethal drug overdose to combat his imagined ailments	N/A
1	Anthony James Marston	Struck and killed two young children while recklessly speeding	Drinks a glass of cyanide-laced whisky	... one choked his little self and then there were nine.
2	Mrs Ethel Rogers	Withheld an employer's medicine in order to cause her death and collect an inheritance	Dies in her sleep after drinking brandy spiked with an overdose of chloral hydrate	... one overslept himself and then there were eight.
3	General John Gordon MacArthur	Sent his wife's lover, an officer under his command, on an unsurvivable mission	Killed by a blow to the head, after concluding that he would never leave the island	... one said he'd stay there and then there were seven.
4	Thomas Rogers	Withheld an employer's medicine in order to cause her death and collect an inheritance	Struck in the head with an axe	... one chopped himself in halves and then there were six.
5	Emily Caroline Brent	Dismissed her teenage maid for becoming pregnant out of wedlock, thus causing the maid to drown herself	Injected with cyanide after being sedated with chloral-laced coffee; bumblebee buzzing nearby	... a bumblebee stung one and then there were five.
6	Lawrence John Wargrave (Mr Justice Wargrave)	Influenced a jury to deliver a guilty verdict against a man thought to be innocent, then sentenced him to death	Shot in the head, dressed as a judge	... one got in Chancery and then there were four.
7	Dr Edward George Armstrong	Operated on a patient while drunk, resulting in her death	Drowns after being pushed off a cliff into the sea, during a secret meeting with the person who is actually the killer	... a red herring swallowed one and then there were three.
8	William Henry Blore	Gave perjured evidence in court, resulting in an innocent man being convicted and sentenced to life in prison, where he died a year later	Head crushed by a marble clock shaped like a bear	... a big bear hugged one and then there were two.
9	Philip Lombard	As a soldier of fortune, stole food from a group of East African tribesmen he was working with, then left them to die	Shot by Vera on the beach with his own revolver	... one got frizzled up and then there was one.
10	Vera Elizabeth Claythorne	As a governess, allowed her young charge to drown so that his uncle could inherit the family estate and marry her	Hangs herself	... he went out and hanged himself and then there were none.

== Reception ==
And Then There Were None received largely positive reviews on publication. Writing for The Times Literary Supplement in November 1939, Maurice Percy Ashley observed that although the novel contained little actual detection, it had no shortage of murders; he found the regular succession of deaths somewhat monotonous, better suited to a serialised newspaper story than a full-length novel, but praised the ingenuity of the central problem of naming the murderer: "It will be an extremely astute reader who guesses correctly." In The Observer, Maurice Richardson declined to draw comparisons with Roger Ackroyd but called the novel "one of the very best, most genuinely bewildering Christies yet written"; he praised its storytelling and characterisation as among her finest and considered the plot, though highly artificial, to be neat, cunningly constructed and free of the misleading red herrings that he felt sometimes marred her work.

Reviewing the first American edition in The New York Times Book Review in 1940, Isaac Anderson wrote that readers would find the events following the gramophone recording impossible to believe yet impossible to stop reading. He called the novel utterly fascinating and the most baffling mystery Christie had yet written — unmatched in his memory for sheer puzzlement — and concluded that, however far-fetched, the story was just plausible enough to have happened. A reviewer in the Toronto Daily Star similarly compared the novel close to Christie's The Murder of Roger Ackroyd, well above her recent work, and rated her unrivalled for ingenious plotting and surprise endings. Later critics continued to regard the novel highly. In 1990, Robert Barnard described it as a suspenseful and menacing blend of detective story and thriller, in which the closed setting and accumulating deaths are taken to their logical extreme while skilfully avoiding absurdity and reader disbelief; he called it probably the best known of Christie's novels and deservedly among the most popular.

And Then There Were None is Christie's best-selling novel, with more than 100 million copies sold as of 2007; it is also the world's best-selling mystery and one of the best-selling books of all time. Publications International lists the novel as the seventh best-selling title of all time.

The novel has frequently been cited among the greatest crime novels ever written. In 1990, the Crime Writers' Association ranked it 19th on its list of The Top 100 Crime Novels of All Time. In 1995, the Mystery Writers of America placed it 10th on a similar list. In 2015, a worldwide poll organised by the author's estate named it the “World's Favourite Christie”. Entertainment Weekly later included the novel in its list of “Nine Great Christie Novels”.

In her autobiography, Christie recalled that she had taken on the book precisely because its premise was so difficult: "Ten people had to die without it becoming ridiculous or the murderer being obvious." After a great deal of planning she was satisfied with the result, which she described as clear and baffling yet logically explicable — so much so that it required an epilogue to resolve. Although the book was well received, she wrote that she herself took the greatest satisfaction from it, knowing better than any critic how difficult it had been; while not claiming it as her favourite or her best, she regarded it as "a better piece of craftsmanship than anything else" she had written.

== Publication ==
The story was serialised in 23 parts in the Daily Express from 6 June to 1 July 1939, with illustrations by "Prescott", the first instalment having an illustration of Burgh Island in Devon which inspired the setting. The novel was first published in the United Kingdom by Collins Crime Club on 6 November 1939 under the title Ten Little Niggers.

The first American edition, published by Dodd, Mead and Company in January 1940, used the title And Then There Were None. The novel was also serialised in the United States in the Saturday Evening Post in seven instalments between May and July 1939, with illustrations by Henry Raleigh.

=== Title and associated language ===
Cover of first UK 1939 edition, with the original title

On first publication in the UK, the novel’s title, the rhyme, the island name, and descriptions of the ten figurines all used the word "Nigger". Later editions continued to use the original title until 1985, when a reprint of the 1963 Fontana Paperback finally adopted And Then There Were None as the standard UK title. The original title persisted in a few later printings: the collected Greenway edition of 1977 and a 1980 Australian omnibus both retained Ten Little Niggers and—aside from continuing reprints of the 1963 Fontana paperback—were among the last English-language editions to use it.

For its first American publication, the book was retitled And Then There Were None as the original wording was considered unacceptably racially loaded in the United States. All references to the original title and associated language were removed (apart from one mention of the phrase "nigger in the woodpile"), and were replaced with “Indian” or, later, “Soldier”. Between 1964 and 1986 the book was published by Pocket Books of New York as Ten Little Indians.

Critics and scholars have discussed the racial language of the novel and its subsequent retitling. Sadie Stein, commenting in 2016 on the BBC mini-series And Then There Were None, noted that "even in 1939, this title was considered too offensive for American publication", and wrote that in general "Christie's work is not known for its racial sensitivity, and by modern standards her oeuvre is rife with casual Orientalism." Literary critic Alison Light argued that the original British title, Ten Little Niggers, and the setting on “Nigger Island” (renamed “Indian Island” and “Soldier Island” in subsequent editions) "could be relied upon automatically to conjure up a thrilling 'otherness', a place where revelations about the 'dark side' of the English would be appropriate." Light suggested that Christie’s use of racialised imagery reflected broader anxieties embedded in British popular culture between the wars; unlike novels such as Heart of Darkness which place menace abroad, Christie's is domestic and private, treating racial fear as something instilled "as early as the nursery" and tied, uncomfortably, to the reader's own enjoyment. Speaking of the "widely known" 1945 film, Stein added that "we're merely faced with fantastic amounts of violence, and a rhyme so macabre and distressing one doesn't hear it now outside of the Agatha Christie context." She felt that the original title of the novel in the UK, seen now, "jars, viscerally".

During the late twentieth and early twenty-first centuries, many foreign-language editions were similarly retitled to remove racial terminology. The estate of Agatha Christie now publishes the novel in English only under the title And Then There Were None.

=== Editions in English ===
The following editions mark a change of title or text:

- Christie, Agatha (November 1939). Ten Little Niggers. London: Collins Crime Club. OCLC 152375426. Hardback, 256 pp. First edition.
- Christie, Agatha (January 1940). And Then There Were None. New York: Dodd, Mead. OCLC 1824276. Hardback, 264 pp. First US edition.
- Christie, Agatha (1963). Ten Little Niggers. London: Fontana. OCLC 12503435. Paperback, 190 pp. The 1985 reprint was the first UK publication of the novel under the title And Then There Were None.
- Christie, Agatha (1964). Ten Little Indians. New York: Pocket Books. OCLC 29462459. First publication of the novel as Ten Little Indians.
- Christie, Agatha (1986). Ten Little Indians. New York: Pocket Books. ISBN 0-671-55222-8. Last publication of the novel under the title Ten Little Indians.

Several other reprints appeared in the intervening years under titles already in use. (Note: Further English-language reprints, under titles already established and without textual change: Christie, Agatha (1944). And Then There Were None. New York: Pocket Books. Paperback, 173 pp. (Pocket number 261).; Christie, Agatha (1947). Ten Little Niggers. London: Pan Books. Paperback, 190 pp. (Pan number 4).; Christie, Agatha (1958). Ten Little Niggers. London: Penguin Books. Paperback, 201 pp. (Penguin number 1256).; Christie, Agatha (1964). And Then There Were None. New York: Washington Square Press. Paperback, teacher's edition.)

=== Foreign-language editions ===
Many early translations retained versions of the original British title, often using local terms that at the time were considered closer in meaning to negro or negrito than to the English racial slur.

From the late twentieth century onward, numerous publishers retitled the novel to remove racial terminology. German editions changed from Zehn kleine Negerlein to Und dann gab's keines mehr in 2003 following public controversy over a stage adaptation. (Note: From Zehn kleine Negerlein to Und dann gab's keines mehr) Similar retitlings later occurred in Dutch, (Note: From Tien kleine negertjes to En toen waren er nog maar...) Swedish, (Note: From Tio små negerpojkar to Och så var de bara en) Brazilian Portuguese, (Note: From O Caso dos Dez Negrinhos to E Não Sobrou Nenhum) Polish, (Note: From Dziesięciu Murzynków to I nie było już nikogo) French, (Note: From Dix petits nègres to Ils étaient dix) Hungarian, (Note: From Tíz kicsi néger to Mert többen nincsenek) and Turkish (Note: From On Küçük Zenci to On Kişiydiler) editions. In 1999, the Slovak National Theatre changed the title of a stage adaptation mid-run. (Note: From Desať malých černoškov to A napokon nezostal už nik)

Some languages adopted alternative titles unrelated to the English versions. European Portuguese editions have appeared both as Convite Para a Morte (“Invitation to Death”) and As Dez Figuras Negras (“The Ten Black Figures”), while the 1940 Finnish translation initially used a title equivalent to And Then There Were None (Eikä yksikään pelastunut, "No one was saved"), before being renamed Kymmenen pientä neekeripoikaa ("Ten little negro boys") in 1968, eventually reverting to the previous title in 2003.

Some recent editions in languages including Spanish, Greek, Serbian, Bulgarian, Romanian, and Russian have continued to use variants of the original Ten Little ... title. The 1987 Soviet film adaptation Desyat Negrityat likewise retained a direct equivalent of the original title. The estate of Agatha Christie now promotes the novel internationally under the English title And Then There Were None, and newer translations increasingly adopt local equivalents of that title.

== Possible inspirations ==
The 1930 novel The Invisible Host by Gwen Bristow and Bruce Manning has a plot that strongly matches that of Christie's later novel, including a recorded voice announcing to the guests that their sins will be visited upon them by death. The Invisible Host was adapted as the 1930 Broadway play The Ninth Guest by Owen Davis, which itself was adapted as the 1934 film The Ninth Guest. There is no evidence Christie saw either the play (which had a brief run on Broadway) or the film.

The 1933 K.B.S. Productions Sherlock Holmes film A Study in Scarlet follows a strikingly similar plot; the victims are tormented by slips of paper inspired by the same poem used in Christie's novel. One says "Six Little Black Boys | Playing With a Hive | A Bumble-Bee Stung One | And Then There Were Five." As in Christie's book, the killer turns out to be one of the "victims" who had appeared to be dead. The film retained no plot points from Arthur Conan Doyle's original story of the same name. The author of the movie's screenplay, Robert Florey, "doubted that [Christie] had seen A Study in Scarlet, but he regarded it as a compliment if it had helped inspire her".

== Adaptations ==
And Then There Were None has had more adaptations than any other work by Agatha Christie. Christie herself changed the bleak ending to a more palatable one for theatre audiences when she adapted the novel for the stage in 1943. Many adaptations incorporate changes to the story, such as using Christie's alternative ending from her stage play or changing the setting to locations other than an island.

=== Film ===
There have been numerous film adaptations of the novel:

- And Then There Were None (1945), an American film by René Clair
- Ten Little Indians (1965), a British film directed by George Pollock and produced by Harry Alan Towers. Set in a mountain retreat in Austria.
- Gumnaam (1965, translation: Unknown or Anonymous), an Indian suspense thriller. This loose, uncredited Hindi film adaptation added the characteristic "Bollywood" elements of comedy, music and dance to Christie's plot.
- Nadu Iravil (1970, translation: In the middle of the night), a Tamil adaptation directed by S. Balachander
- And Then There Were None (1974), the first English-language colour version, directed by Peter Collinson and produced by Harry Alan Towers. Based on a screenplay by Towers (writing as "Peter Welbeck"), who co-wrote the screenplay for the 1965 film. Set at a grand hotel in the Iranian desert.
- Desyat' Negrityat (1987, Десять негритят, translation: Ten Little Negroes) a Russian adaptation produced/directed by Stanislav Govorukhin. The film concludes with the grim finale from Agatha Christie's original novel, rather than the upbeat ending from the 1943 stage version that most other adaptations chose to follow.
- Ten Little Indians, a 1989 British version, produced by Harry Alan Towers and directed by Alan Birkinshaw, set on safari in the African savannah
- Aatagara, a 2015 Indian Kannada-language adaptation directed by K. M. Chaitanya. The action takes place during a reality show.

=== Radio ===
The BBC broadcast Ten Little Niggers (1947), adapted by Ayton Whitaker, first aired as a Monday Matinee on the BBC Home Service on 27 December 1947 and as Saturday Night Theatre on the BBC Light Programme on 29 December.

On 13 November 2010, as part of its Saturday Play series, BBC Radio 4 broadcast a 90-minute adaptation written by Joy Wilkinson. The production was directed by Mary Peate and featured Geoffrey Whitehead as Mr Justice Wargrave, Lyndsey Marshal as Vera Claythorne, Alex Wyndham as Philip Lombard, John Rowe as Dr Armstrong, and Joanna Monro as Emily Brent.

=== Stage ===
There are two primary versions of And Then There Were None performed on stage, one with an ending faithful to the novel and the other with a happy ending twist. Both were performed while Christie was alive and with her input or blessing. At least one other prominent re-imagining has been produced.

==== The original stage play ====
And Then There Were None which premiered in 1943, is Christie's own adaptation of the story for the stage. She and the producers agreed that audiences might not flock to a tale with such a grim ending as the novel, nor would it work well dramatically as there would be no one left to tell the story. Christie reworked the ending for Lombard and Vera to be innocent of the crimes of which they were accused, survive, and fall in love with each other. Some of the names were also changed, e.g., General MacArthur became General McKenzie in both the New York and London productions. By 1943, General Douglas MacArthur was playing a prominent role in the Pacific Theatre of World War II, which may explain the change of the character's name.

==== With the original ending ====
In 1944, Dundee Repertory Theatre Company was given permission to restore the original ending of the novel. The company first performed a stage adaptation of the novel in August 1944 under the UK title of the novel, Ten Little Niggers, with Christie credited as the dramatist. It was the first performance in repertory theatre. It was staged again in 1965.

==== 2005 adaptation ====
On 14 October 2005, a new more-gruesome version of the story, written by Kevin Elyot and directed by Steven Pimlott, opened at the Gielgud Theatre in London under the title And Then There Were None. For this version, Elyot returned to the original ending of the novel. During at least one of the preview performances, when one of the characters is poisoned, an actor began "projectile vomiting ... and hit the front row," although this was toned down later in the adaptation's run. Tara Fitzgerald starred as Vera, Graham Crowden as the General, and Anthony Howell as Lombard.

=== Television ===
Three British TV adaptations have been broadcast: the first by the BBC in 1949, and the second by ITV in 1959 (both under Christie's original title); the third appeared on BBC One in 2015 as And Then There Were None.

An American TV movie by Paul Bogart aired on NBC in 1959. In 2010, American animated TV series Family Guy adapted the story as "And Then There Were Fewer".

There have been many foreign-language TV adaptations:

- A Portuguese-language version for Brazilian television, broadcast 16 February 1957, titled O Caso dos Dez Negrinhos
- O Caso dos Dez Negrinhos, a 1963 episode of the Brazilian anthology series Grande Teatro Tupi
- A West German television production, Zehn kleine Negerlein, which aired in 1969
- Dix petits nègres, a 1970 episode of the French anthology series Au théâtre ce soir
- Achra Abid Zghar (1974, translation: Ten Little Slaves), a Télé Liban TV series directed by Jean Fayyad, adapted for television by Latifeh Moultaka
- Deka Mikroi Negroi, a 1978 episode of the Greek anthology series To theatro tis Defteras
- A free Spanish adaptation made by RTVE in 2011 as the two-parter The mystery of the ten strangers for the second season of Los misterios de Laura (part 1 and part 2)
- Achra Abid Zghar (2014, translation: Ten Little Slaves), an MTV Lebanon television production
- And Then There Were None, a 2015 BBC mini series adapted by Sarah Phelps and directed by Craig Viveiros.
- Soshite daremo inakunatta (そして誰もいなくなった), a two-part Japanese-language adaptation by Shukei Nagasaka (長坂秀佳, Nagasaka Shukei) set in modern times, aired 25 and 26 March 2017 on TV Asahi in Japan. It was directed by Seiji Izumi and adapted for television by Hideka Nagasaka.
- Ils étaient dix, a French six-part miniseries produced by M6 and aired in 2020, set on a tropical island in present time

=== Other media ===
The novel was the inspiration for several video games. For the Apple II, Online Systems released Mystery House in 1980. On the PC, The Adventure Company released Agatha Christie: And Then There Were None in 2005, the first in a series of PC games based on Christie novels. In February 2008, it was ported to the Wii console.

And Then There Were None was released by HarperCollins as a graphic novel adaptation on 30 April 2009, adapted by François Rivière and illustrated by Frank Leclercq.

In 2014, Peká Editorial released a board game based on the book, Diez Negritos ("Ten Little Negroes"), created by Judit Hurtado and Fernando Chavarría, and illustrated by Esperanza Peinado.

The 2014 live action comedy-crime and murder mystery TV web series Ten Little Roosters, produced by American company Rooster Teeth, is largely inspired by And Then There Were None.

A manga adaptation illustrated by Aya Nikaido was serialized on Hayakawa Publishing's Hayacomic website from July 23 to December 17, 2024, with its chapters collected in three volumes. The manga was licensed for English publication by Viz Media in 2026.
