= British Society of Cinematographers =

Learned society based in the UK

- Founded: 1949
- Headquarters: Pinewood Studios, England
- Location: United Kingdom
- Members: 256
- Key people: Oliver Stapleton BSC, President
- Website: bscine.com

The British Society of Cinematographers (abbreviated BSC) is an organisation formed in 1949 by Bert Easey (23 August 1901 – 28 February 1973), the then head of the Denham and Pinewood studio camera departments, to represent British cinematographers in the British film industry.

The stated objectives at the formation of the BSC were:

- To promote and encourage the pursuit of the highest standards in the craft of Motion Picture Photography.
- To further the applications by others of the highest standards in the craft of Motion Picture Photography and to encourage original and outstanding work.
- To co-operate with all whose aims and interests are wholly or in part related to those of the society.
- To provide facilities for social intercourse between the members and arrange lectures, debates and meetings calculated to further the objects of the Society.

There were originally 55 members. Currently, there are 256 full, honorary and associate members. For a British cinematographer, membership of the BSC is an affirmation of the high standard of their craft. The members of the British Society of Cinematographers are entitled to use BSC as postnominals in motion picture and television credits.

== Notable members ==
BSC members have won 22 Academy Awards over the last 95 years. Below is a list of some of their most notable members.

- Jack Cardiff OBE BSC – first cinematographer to be awarded an honorary Academy Award.
- Robert Krasker BSC – cinematographer of Henry V (1944), Brief Encounter (1945), Odd Man Out (1947),The Third Man (1949), Romeo and Juliet (1954), Trapeze (1956), El Cid (1961), Billy Budd (1962) and The Fall of the Roman Empire (1964), winning the Best Cinematography, Black-and-white Academy Award in 1951 for The Third Man.
- Geoffrey Unsworth OBE BSC – cinematographer of Cabaret (1972) and Tess (1979).
- Oswald Morris OBE BSC – cinematographer of Oliver! (1968) and Fiddler on the Roof (1971).
- Freddie Young OBE BSC – David Lean's cinematographer, who shot Lawrence of Arabia (1962), Doctor Zhivago (1965) and Ryan's Daughter (1970).
- David Watkin BSC – Academy Award-winner for Out of Africa (1985).
- Freddie Francis BSC – cinematographer of The Elephant Man (1980) and Glory (1989).
- Billy Williams OBE BSC – cinematographer of Women in Love (1969), On Golden Pond (1981) and Gandhi (1982).
- Gilbert Taylor BSC – cinematographer of Star Wars (1977).
- Ted Moore BSC – cinematographer of the James Bond films Dr. No (1962), From Russia with Love (1963), Goldfinger (1964), Thunderball (1965) and Live and Let Die (1973).
- Sir Roger Deakins CBE ASC BSC – cinematographer of The Shawshank Redemption (1994), Fargo (1996), The Assassination of Jesse James by the Coward Robert Ford (2007), Skyfall (2012) and Blade Runner 2049 (2017).

== Governance ==
The current president of the British Society of Cinematographers is Oliver Stapleton BSC. The BSC Board of Governors is made up 18 Full Members and a co-opted member from the Associate Membership. The 2025–226 Board of Governors are:

- Oliver Stapleton BSC – President
- Laurie Rose BSC – Vice-President
- Stephen Murphy BSC ISC – Vice-President
- Oliver Stapleton BSC – Vice-President
- Stuart Bentley BSC
- Balazs Bolygo BSC
- John Daly BSC
- Adriano Goldman ASC BSC ABC
- Catherine Goldschmidt ASC BSC
- Baz Irvine BSC ISC
- Benjamin Kračun BSC
- Dale Elena McCready BSC NZCS
- Zac Nicolson BSC
- Mattias Nyberg BSC
- Tim Palmer BSC
- Jake Polonsky BSC
- Kate Reid BSC
- Fabian Wagner ASC BSC
- Chris Plevin ACO – Co-opted Associate Member Representative

The BSC employs four members of staff. Mary Egan serves as General Manager, Helen Maclean runs the BSC Office, Duncan Bruce servers as Membership Engagement and Social Media and Frances Russell serves as Archivist.

== Award categories ==
=== Film ===
- Best Cinematography in a Theatrical Feature Film

=== Television ===
- Best Cinematography in a Television Drama (UK Terrestrial)
- Best Cinematography in a Television Drama (International/Streaming)
- Best Cinematography in a Music Video

=== Other ===
- Lifetime Achievement Award
- BSC Bert Easey Technical Award
- Special Achievement Award
- BSC ARRI John Alcott Memorial Award
- BSC Cinematography In A Short Film (BSC Club)
- BSC Cinematography In A Short Film (Postgraduate Student)
- BSC Cinematography In A Short Film (Undergraduate Student)
- The Operators Award - Feature Film (presented with the Association of Camera Operators and the Guild of British Camera Technicians.
- The Operators Award - TV Drama (presented with the Association of Camera Operators and the Guild of British Camera Technicians.

== In popular culture ==
In the 1981 film The Great Muppet Caper, Kermit and Fozzie comment on the opening credits as they appear. When the name of the film's cinematographer Oswald Morris with his post-nominal letters appears, Fozzie asks, "What does B.S.C. stand for?", to which Kermit perplexedly replies, "I don't know."

== See also ==
- American Society of Cinematographers
- Australian Cinematographers Society
- Canadian Society of Cinematographers
- Japanese Society of Cinematographers
