= Ten Little Indians (1989 film) =

1989 film by Alan Birkinshaw

- Theatrical release poster
- Directed by: Alan Birkinshaw
- Screenplay by: Jackson Hunsicker; Gerry O'Hara
- Based on: 1939 play and novel And Then There Were None; Agatha Christie
- Produced by: Harry Alan Towers
- Starring: Donald Pleasence; Brenda Vaccaro; Frank Stallone; Sarah Maur Thorp; Herbert Lom; Warren Berlinger; Yehuda Elfroni; Moira Lister
- Cinematography: Arthur Lavis
- Edited by: Penelope Shaw
- Music by: George S. Clinton
- Distributed by: Cannon Films
- Release date: November 1989 (U.S.)
- Running time: 98 minutes
- Country: United Kingdom
- Language: English
- Box office: $59,405

Ten Little Indians is a 1989 mystery film directed by Alan Birkinshaw. The fourth English-language screen adaptation of Agatha Christie's 1939 novel And Then There Were None, it was the third version to be produced by Harry Alan Towers, following his 1965 and 1974 adaptations.

The opening credits state that this film is based on Christie's 1943 stage adaptation and make no mention of the novel itself, perhaps because the film's climax is taken almost verbatim from the stage script. (Note: Most other film adaptations, while still using an upbeat finale, have significantly toned down the action-packed climax Christie used in the play.) This version also introduced a lesbian affair. Herbert Lom, who plays the General here, previously starred in the 1974 version as Dr. Armstrong.

As of December 2013, this production has been released on VHS and laserdisc. A German DVD release (including the English version) became available in 2015. It was released on Blu-ray by Kino Lorber on 30 June 2020. As of 2021, the movie is now available on Amazon Prime.

== Plot ==
A group of ten disparate people, strangers to each other, have all been summoned by a mysterious host named Mr. Owen to travel to Africa and join him on a safari he is hosting. Philip Lombard guides the entourage with the aid of local natives through the jungle.

Things turn ominous: First their native guides abandon them, then cut the bridge line (their only way in and out of camp). As a result, the eight guests, plus a married couple, the Rodgers, find themselves isolated in their hunting camp. In addition, their host, Mr. Owen, is absent. Following their dinner, by means of a gramophone recording, an inhuman voice accuses each person of a murder that they had caused, for which they had escaped justice.

Marston dies first, choking to death after drinking a poisoned martini. His death mimics the first verse of the English nursery rhyme 'Ten Little Indians'. One of the ten Indian dolls that adorn the dining table is found with its head snapped off. In the morning, Rodgers' wife Ethel Mae is found dead in her bed (possibly from an overdose), fulfilling the second line of the rhyme. Suspicion arises that they are being picked off by a dangerous lunatic. As four of the men set off with rifles to hunt down Mr. Owen, General Romensky is pushed off a cliff and dies. The guests realize that "Mr. Owen" may be one of them. It is discovered the radio has been sabotaged and all the ammunition are blanks.

Rodgers dies next with an axe buried in his head. Marion Marshall dies with a hypodermic syringe filled with poison. This puts suspicion on Dr. Werner. Lombard manages to repair the radio and makes contact with the outside; a spotter plane will be sent the next morning. At night, the terrified remaining guests admit to their guilt. A storm arrives and Wargrave dies, shot in the head. Dr. Werner dies with his throat slit. Blore barricades himself in his tent, only to be found dead the morning after, stabbed in the chest.

By now, only Lombard and Vera are left, and Vera turns on Lombard with his gun. He lunges at her and she shoots him. She returns to the common tent where Wargrave, alive, is waiting, wearing his judicial robes and wig, with a noose prepared for her to fulfil the last verse of the rhyme. He forces Vera at gunpoint into the noose and explains how Dr. Werner helped him fake his own death so he would be free to spy on the rest of the party: the "red herring" from the rhyme. He then killed Dr. Werner. Wargrave explains that after being diagnosed with a terminal illness, he planned the safari – his own 'private, big game hunt'. He wanted to commit murder on a grand scale and execute justice to those 'who had escaped their hangman'. He pulls the chair out from under Vera and watches her struggle in glee as he drinks poisoned wine to kill himself as well. He dies and Lombard re-appears, alive, only grazed by the bullet Vera shot, and rescues her. They leave together as the rescue plane arrives.

== Cast and characters ==
- Donald Pleasence as Justice Lawrence Wargrave. Accused of having sentenced an innocent man, Edward Seton, to death by hanging.
- Frank Stallone as Captain Philip Lombard. Accused of being responsible for the deaths of 21 men, members of an East Indian tribe.
- Sarah Maur Thorp as Vera Claythorne. Accused of being responsible for the drowning of her young charge, Cyril Ogilvie Hamilton.
- Brenda Vaccaro as Marion Marshall. Accused of being responsible for the death of a fellow actress and lover, Miss Beatrice Taylor.
- Herbert Lom as General Brancko Romensky. Accused of having intentionally sent his wife's lover, Heinrich Domaratsky, one of his junior officers, on a suicide mission during World War I.
- Warren Berlinger as William Henry Blore. Accused of having given false testimony that sent an innocent man named Stephen Joseph Landor to prison, where he eventually died.
- Yehuda Efroni as Dr. Hans Joachim Werner. Accused of operating on a woman named Ursula Margaret Lismann while under the influence of alcohol, inadvertently leading to her death.
- Paul L. Smith as Elmo Rodgers. Accused of the murder of his wealthy, invalid employer, Miss Jennifer Brady.
- Moira Lister as Ethel Mae Rodgers. Accused of assisting her husband in murdering their wealthy, invalid employer, Miss Jennifer Brady.
- Neil McCarthy as Anthony James Marston. Accused of having run over a young couple named John and Lucy Combes while driving under the influence of alcohol.
