= And Then There Were None (1974 film) =

1974 British film by Peter Collinson

- A poster using the US title: Ten Little Indians
- Directed by: Peter Collinson
- Screenplay by: Harry Alan Towers (as "Peter Welbeck"); Uncredited: Enrique Llovet
- Based on: And Then There Were None; 1939 novel by Agatha Christie
- Produced by: Harry Alan Towers
- Starring: Richard Attenborough; Oliver Reed; Herbert Lom; Stéphane Audran; Elke Sommer; Gert Fröbe; Charles Aznavour; Naser Malek Motiei
- Cinematography: Fernando Arribas
- Edited by: John Trumper; Gabrielle Reinecke; Mike Crowley
- Music by: Bruno Nicolai
- Production companies: Corona Filmproduktion; Talía Films; COMECI
- Distributed by: Variety Distribution
- Release date: 1974
- Running time: 98 min.
- Countries: Italy; West Germany; France; Spain; United Kingdom; Iran
- Language: English

And Then There Were None (U.S. title: Ten Little Indians; also known as E Poi Non Rimase Nessuno, Ein Unbekannter rechnet ab, Diez negritos, Dix petits nègres) is a 1974 mystery film and an adaptation of Agatha Christie's best-selling 1939 mystery novel of the same name. The film was directed by Peter Collinson and produced by Harry Alan Towers. This was the fourth of five versions of Christie's novel to be adapted to the screen and the second from producer Harry Alan Towers. Two film adaptations were previously released (a 1945 version by René Clair and Towers' 1965 adaptation Ten Little Indians). An American made-for-television version was broadcast in 1959. Towers produced a third version in 1989.

== Plot ==
A group of ten people, strangers to one another, arrive at a hotel deep in the Iranian desert, located adjacent to the ruins of Persepolis, 200 miles from civilization. The guests quickly discover that their host is mysteriously absent. He calls himself U.N. Owen ("unknown") and is someone none of them knows. At dinner, they notice a display of figurines: the Ten Little Indians, representing a section of the doggerel in each of their suites. Via a tape recording, their host accuses each of them of being responsible for the deaths of certain people and of having escaped justice.

While they are still initially gathered together, singer Michel Raven falls down dead, his drink having been poisoned. Then, during the night, the housekeeper/cook, Elsa Martino, goes missing and is found strangled against a pillar. A general search of the hotel is initiated by General Salve, who splits everyone into pairs. Not long after everyone separates, Salve is stabbed to death in the hotel's catacombs. The search reveals there is no one else alive in the hotel except the seven of them, so they conclude the killer must be one of them.

The next morning, Elsa's husband, the butler Martino, attempts to escape through the desert and dies of heat exhaustion, his survival kit having been sabotaged. The actress Ilona reveals her past to the others, including the cause of her husband's suicide. Later, she is found dead, bitten by a venomous snake. The power and lights in the hotel suddenly go out, leaving the five remaining guests in darkness. Judge Cannon convinces them to reveal the nature of the crimes of which they stand accused. Before Vera offers her own explanation, she leaves the others in the darkness to get her coat. She screams, and the others run to find her. Judge Cannon is found dead in his bedroom, shot in the head.

Because Vera refuses to confess to her guilt, as the other four have, Dr. Armstrong becomes suspicious of Vera and has her locked in her room. Hugh goes to Vera's room during the night and gives her his gun. Vera tells him that her sister committed the murder she is accused of, and Vera covered for her. Her sister killed herself afterwards. Hugh reveals that he is in fact Charles Morley and that the real Hugh Lombard was his best friend, who also committed suicide after the crime of which he was accused. Charles found Hugh's invitation among his belongings while clearing them after his death, and took his friend's place, hoping to learn what caused Hugh to take his life.

The next morning, Dr. Armstrong is nowhere to be found. A search of the ruins leads to Blore being pushed off a ledge to his death. Vera and Charles assume Armstrong is the killer, but then find his corpse in the ruins and that he has been dead for hours. Thinking they are now the only two remaining, one of them must be the killer. Vera shoots Charles.

Vera returns to the hotel, where she finds all the furniture covered in sheets again, except for a chair with a noose above. She finds Judge Cannon very much alive. He reveals that he tricked Dr. Armstrong into helping him fake his "death". He explains his desire to seek perfect justice and perform his duty as an executioner of the guilty. Cannon tries to convince Vera to hang herself, to avoid spending the rest of her life in jail, since the authorities will assume she is the obvious murderer, as the only remaining guest alive. Cannon drinks poison, only to see Charles appear, alive. Having assumed that Vera had shot and killed Charles, Cannon chokes on the poison. With Cannon dead, Vera and Charles are picked up by a helicopter as the tape recording replays over the end credits.

== Cast ==
- Charles Aznavour as Michel Raven, entertainer. Accused of having run over two people in Paris while driving under the influence of alcohol.
- Stéphane Audran as Ilona Morgan, actress. Accused of having been responsible for the death of her husband "in a most cold-blooded and ruthless manner."
- Elke Sommer as Vera Clyde, secretary. Accused of having fatally poisoned her sister's fiancé.
- Gert Fröbe as Wilhelm Blore, police official. Accused of committing perjury to frame an innocent man, who subsequently died in prison.
- Herbert Lom as Edward Armstrong, doctor. Accused of having operated on a woman while drunk, causing her death.
- Oliver Reed as Hugh Lombard/Charles Morley, businessman. Accused of murdering the young woman who was to bear his child out of wedlock.
- Richard Attenborough as Arthur Cannon, judge. Accused of having sentenced an innocent man to death by hanging.
- Maria Rohm as Elsa Martino, servant. Accused of helping her husband cause the death of their wealthy, invalid employer.
- Alberto de Mendoza as Otto Martino, servant. Accused of causing the death of his wealthy, invalid employer after tricking her into including him and his wife in her will.
- Adolfo Celi as André Salvé, military general. Accused of having been responsible for the deaths of five men who were under his command.
- Orson Welles as "U.N. Owen" – the Voice on the Tape.
- Naser Malek Motiei as Policeman (uncredited)

== Production ==
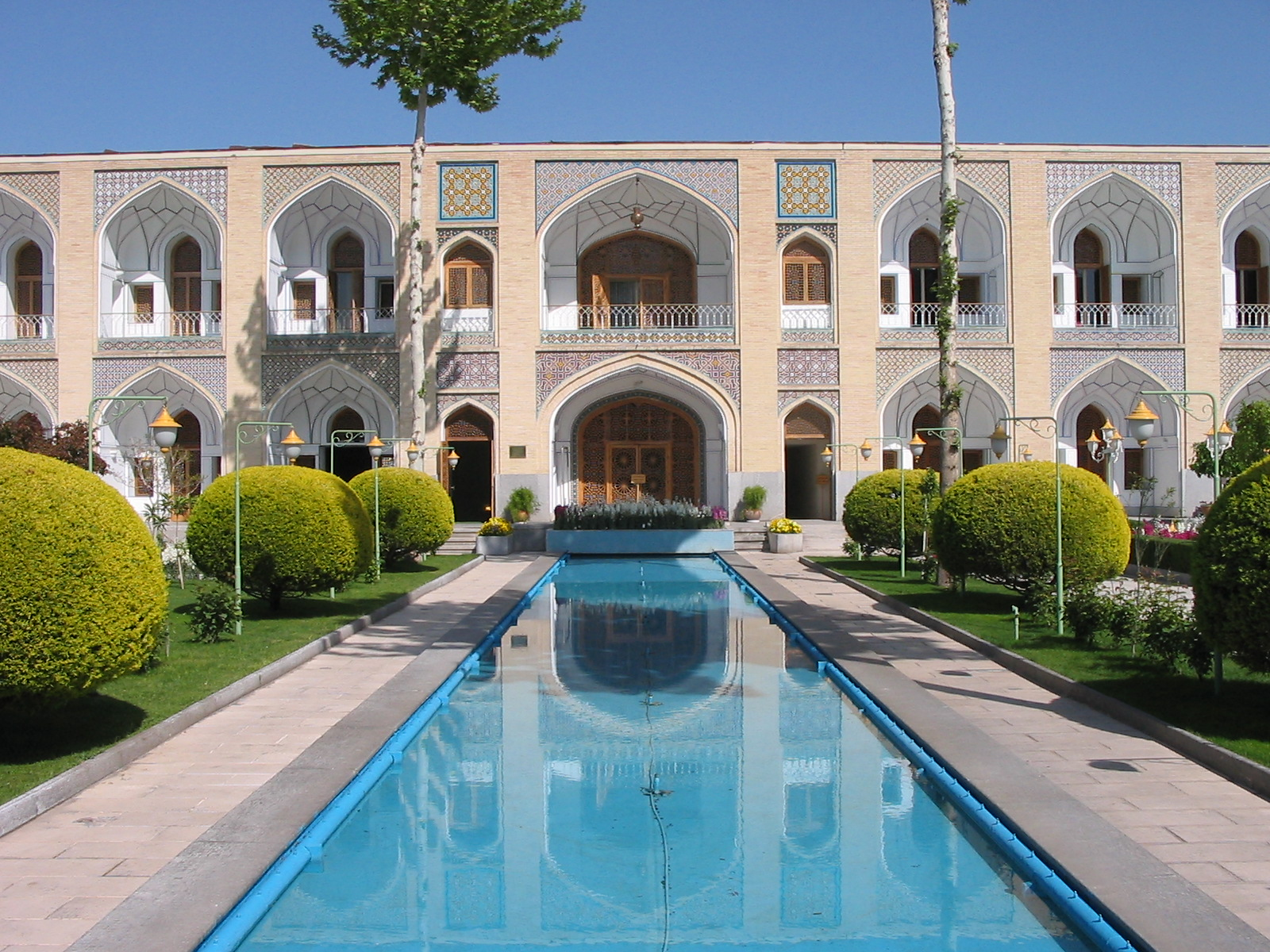
Courtyard of the Abbasi Hotel, as seen in the film

=== Writing ===
The 1974 film reuses the script of the 1965 version, even calling Oliver Reed's character "Hugh" instead of "Phillip," which was the character's name in the novel and play. It is set in an abandoned hotel in the Iranian desert.

=== Casting ===
Herbert Lom, who plays Dr. Armstrong in this film, also starred in the 1989 version, as the General (played by Adolfo Celi in this version).

=== Filming ===
Much of the film was shot on location in pre-revolution Iran. It is set at a massive, fictional hotel in the desert, adjacent to the ruins of Persepolis.

Interior scenes were filmed at the Shah Abbas Hotel in Isfahan. The nearby Shah Mosque served as the hotel's exterior and main entrance. Wide shots of the hotel, next to the ruins, are effects shots combining photography of the mosque and the ruins. Portions of the film were shot within the ruins of Persepolis, and the famous terrace of the Ālī Qāpū palace, in Isfahan, is made to appear to be part of the ruins. The Bam Citadel was used as a location for Martino's death in the desert. Desert exteriors were filmed in Almería in Andalucía, Spain.

=== Versions ===
The European cut of the film featured a pre-credit sequence that showed the guests arriving by plane before boarding a helicopter to be transported to the hotel. However, this prologue was cut from the US release.

== Release ==
The film was an international co-production, with numerous titles worldwide in various languages. It had multiple titles even in English-speaking markets. It was released as And Then There Were None in the UK by EMI Films and in Australia by BEF Films. It was released as Ten Little Indians in the US by Avco Embassy Pictures.

== Reception ==
The Monthly Film Bulletin wrote: "And Then There Were None is the third movie adaptation of Agatha Christie's variously titled novel of retribution on an island off the Devon coast. ... This multi-national adaptation, however, dilutes the original by transplanting the action to an unspecified locale, substituting an unrelated cast of jet-set characters, adding a happy end and, worst of all, neglecting the victims' relationships in favour of lingering shots of Iranian ruins, while the somnolent cast wanders about the Shah Abbas hotel in Isfahan (a huge gold and mosaic affair which could have hidden a dozen Mr. Owen's). The staging of the murders – which are awaited without visible concern – reaches its nadir when Oliver Reed desperately belabours the patently rubber snake which has just bitten Stéphane Audran; the film's opportunism is most evident when Aznavour sits down to the piano, minutes before being poisoned, for a quick after-dinner rendition of 'Dance in the Old-Fashioned Way'."

In 2018, Jeffrey Kauffman of Blu-ray.com praised the film as "a rather stylish outing", enjoying how the camerawork had "a variety of unusual framings that subliminally [increase] anxiety." Although he wrote that he could not "outright" recommend the film, he was "entertained enough", appreciating how "the Iranian location gives it a bit of an exotic flavour, and the cast has some good performances."
