= The Mask of Fu Manchu =

1932 film

- Trolley card advertisement
- Directed by: Charles Brabin
- Screenplay by: Irene Kuhn; Edgar Allan Woolf; John Willard
- Based on: The Mask of Fu Manchu by Sax Rohmer
- Starring: Boris Karloff; Lewis Stone; Karen Morley; Charles Starrett; Myrna Loy; Jean Hersholt
- Cinematography: Tony Gaudio
- Edited by: Ben Lewis
- Production companies: Metro-Goldwyn-Mayer; Cosmopolitan Productions
- Distributed by: Metro-Goldwyn-Mayer Distributing Corp.
- Release date: 4 November 1932
- Running time: 68 minutes
- Country: United States
- Language: English

The Mask of Fu Manchu is a 1932 American pre-Code film directed by Charles Brabin. Written by Irene Kuhn, Edgar Allan Woolf and John Willard, it was based on the 1932 novel of the same name by Sax Rohmer. The film, featuring Boris Karloff as Fu Manchu and Myrna Loy as his daughter, revolves around Fu Manchu's quest for the golden sword and mask of Genghis Khan. Lewis Stone played his nemesis.

The film was made following Metro-Goldwyn-Mayer's box office failure of Freaks (1932). Karloff, who was fresh off his role in Frankenstein (1931) for Universal, found the film did not have a completed script and was given his lines during and after his daily preparation in the makeup chair. Following a difficult production, it was a financial success for the studio despite generally negative reviews. On the film's theatrical re-release in 1972, the Japanese American Citizens League requested that the film be removed from circulation due to its negative portrayal of Asian people.

== Plot summary ==
Sir Denis Nayland Smith of the British Secret Service warns Egyptologist Sir Lionel Barton that he must beat Fu Manchu in the race to find the tomb of Genghis Khan. Fu Manchu intends to use Khan's sword and mask to proclaim himself the reincarnation of the legendary conqueror and inflame the peoples of Asia and the Middle East into a war to wipe out the "white race". Barton is kidnapped soon afterward and taken to Fu Manchu, who tries bribing his captive for the tomb's location, even offering his own daughter, Fah Lo See. When that fails, Barton suffers the "torture of the bell" (lying underneath a gigantic, constantly ringing bell) in an unsuccessful attempt to get him to reveal the location of the tomb.

Barton's daughter Sheila insists on taking her father's place on the expedition, as she knows where the tomb is. She finds the tomb and its treasures with the help of her fiancé Terrence "Terry" Granville and his associates, Dr. Von Berg and McLeod. Smith joins them soon afterward.

McLeod is killed by one of Fu Manchu's men during a robbery attempt, after McLeod kills one of Fu Manchu's men. An emissary offers to trade Barton for the priceless artifacts. Despite Terry's misgivings, Sheila persuades him to take the relics to Fu Manchu without Smith's knowledge. However, when Fu Manchu tests the sword he determines that it is a fake (Smith had switched them). Terry is whipped under the supervision of Fah Lo See, who is attracted to him. Meanwhile, Fu Manchu has Barton's severed hand delivered to Sheila. When Smith tries to rescue Terry, he is taken captive as well.

Terry is injected with a serum that makes him temporarily obedient to Fu Manchu and released. He tells Sheila and Von Berg that Smith wants them to bring the sword and mask to him. Sheila senses something is wrong, but Von Berg digs up the real relics and they follow Terry into a trap. Captured by Fu Manchu, the party is sentenced to death or enslavement, but not before Sheila manages to bring Terry back to his senses. Sheila is to become a human sacrifice, Smith is to be lowered into a crocodile pit, and Von Berg placed between two sets of metal spikes inching toward each other. Terry is prepared for another dose of the serum, which will make him a permanent slave of Fu Manchu's daughter. However, Smith manages to free himself, Terry and Von Berg. Using one of Fu Manchu's own weapons—a death ray that shoots an electric current—the men incapacitate the archvillain as he raises the sword to execute Sheila. When Fu Manchu drops the sword, Terry picks it up and hacks him to death. While Terry frees Sheila and carries her away, Smith and Von Berg incinerate Fu Manchu's followers using the same weapon. Safely aboard a ship bound for England, Smith tosses the sword over the side so that the world will be safe from any future Fu Manchu.

== Cast ==
- Boris Karloff as Dr. Fu Manchu
- Lewis Stone as Sir Denis Nayland Smith
- Karen Morley as Sheila Barton
- Charles Starrett as Terrence Granville
- Myrna Loy as Fah Lo See
- Jean Hersholt as Dr. Von Berg
- Lawrence Grant as Sir Lionel Barton
- David Torrence as McLeod

== Production ==
=== Background ===
After witnessing a man he believed to be the head of a dope-smuggling gang in London's Chinatown area, author Sax Rohmer used his memory of the event for his first novel, The Insidious Dr. Fu Manchu (1913). The author then wrote several novels featuring the character for the next forty years, with his final novel being Emperor Fu Manchu published in 1959. Prior to the release of The Mask of Fu Manchu film, the character was adapted to the screen in the British serial The Mystery of Dr. Fu Manchu (1923) and later with Warner Oland portraying the character in The Mysterious Dr. Fu Manchu (1929) and The Return of Dr. Fu Manchu (1930) for Paramount Pictures.

Rohmer's work in 1932 included a serial entitled The Mask of Fu Manchu that was published in Colliers magazine from May 7 to July 23, 1932. Metro-Goldwyn-Mayer contracted out actor Boris Karloff, who had just completed work at the studio for The Old Dark House. For the director, MGM chose Charles Vidor in what would be his directorial debut.

As the production start date was approaching, MGM still had no script for the film. Karloff recalled that he requested a script about a week before starting and stated he was met with roars of laughter at the idea of there being a completed script. On August 1, 1932, film producer Hunt — began dictating the storyline and plot elements such as torture scenes that Irene Kuhn, Edgar Allan Woolf, and John Willard would collaborate on over the next two and a half months. Woolf was a contract writer who would contribute to MGM films like Freaks (1932) and Willard was the author of the play The Cat and the Canary.

=== Filming ===
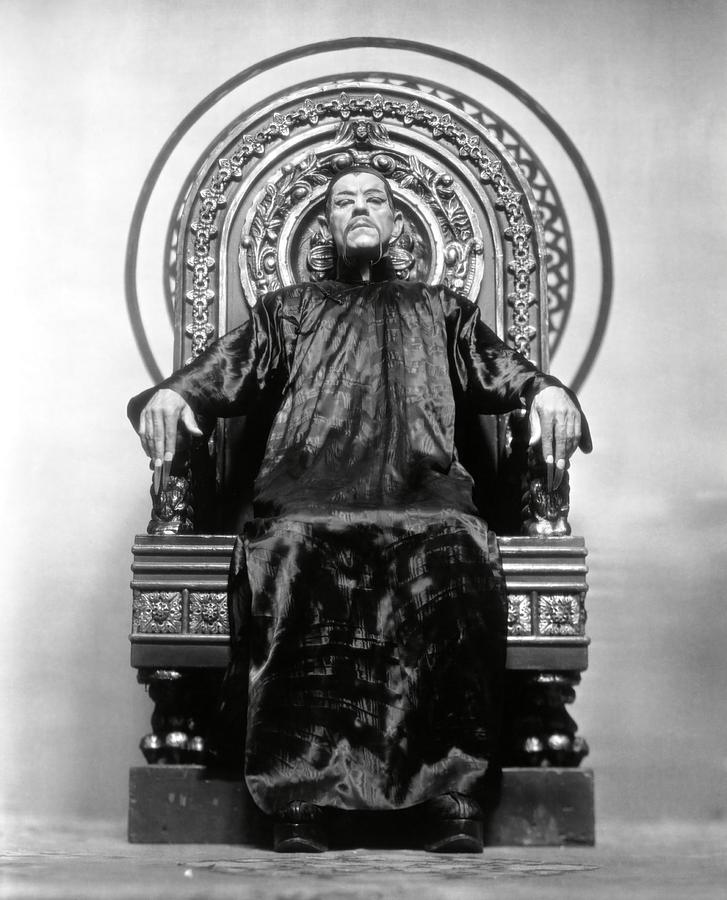
Boris Karloff as Fu Manchu in a promotional photo for The Mask of Fu Manchu (1932).

Filming of The Mask of Fu Manchu began at MGM Studios in Culver City, California, on August 6, 1932. Karloff had to be in his makeup chair for two and a half hours to receive his Fu Manchu makeup from Cecil Holland. Karloff recalled that the makeup was "extremely bad" and that while in the chair he received four sheets of paper that would become the opening shot of the film. After completing makeup, he would receive new papers written in pidgin English, leading Karloff to proclaim that "Some scenes were written in beautiful Oxford English, others were written in - God knows what!" Myrna Loy, who played Fah Lo See, Fu Manchu's daughter, described herself as being "tossed" into the film by the studio and that she told one of the producers "I can't do this... I've done a lot of terrible things in film, but this girl's a sadistic nymphomaniac." Loy continued, stating that she and Karloff "brought some feeling and humor to those comic book characters. Boris was a fine actor, a professional who never condescended to his often unworthy material."

In the middle of August, MGM staff began viewing the film rushes of The Mask of Fu Manchu and feared they would have another financial failure like Freaks on their schedule, and film production was shut down. Director Vidor was fired with most, if not all, of the footage he shot removed from the finished film. He was replaced with Charles Brabin. As production was beginning, MGM had to deal with other issues associated with the death of producer Paul Bern. Stromberg only returned to dictate ideas for The Mask of Fu Manchu, on September 9. On September 19, Stromberg dictated "God forgive us for shooting what we have." Retakes and new scenes extended on for the next month, with filming ending on October 21. The final cost was $327,627.26.

== Release ==
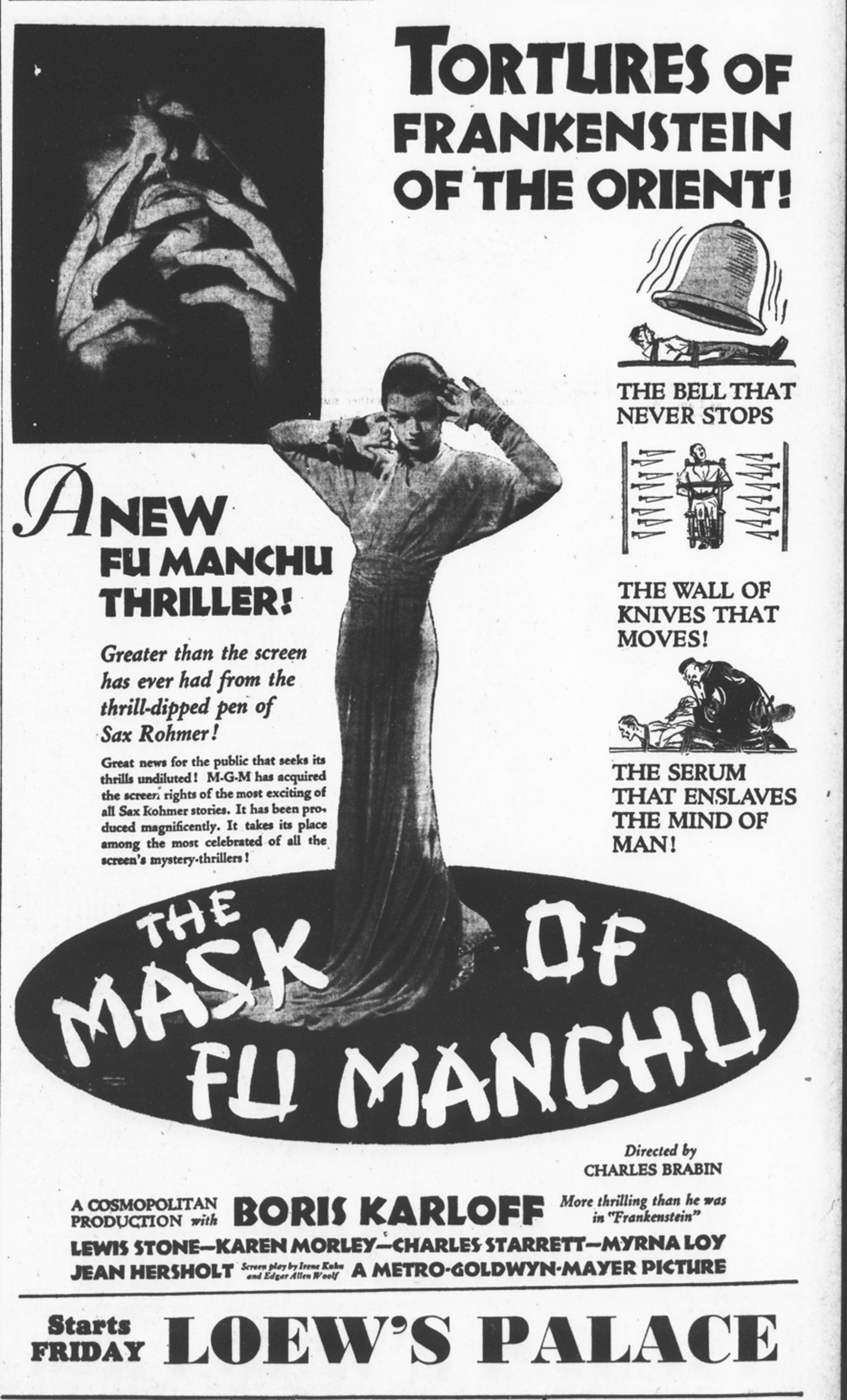
Advertisement from 1932

The Mask of Fu Manchu was shown theatrically as early as November 4, 1932. It had its New York City premiere at the Capitol Theatre on December 2, 1932. The film cost a total of $338,000 and had worldwide rentals of $625,000. It had a profit of $62,000.

MGM would re-release The Mask of Fu Manchu in 1972 as a triple feature with Dr. Jekyll and Mr. Hyde (1931) and Mark of the Vampire (1935). The same year, MGM received a letter from the Japanese American Citizens League to remove the film from their catalogue, stating that "Fu Manchu is an ugly, evil homosexual with five-inch fingernails while his daughter is a sadistic sex fiend." MGM did not respond to these complaints during this period. The Mask of Fu Manchu was not released on home video in the 1980s, with MGM/United Artists stating that their releases of films like Freaks, Mark of the Vampire and The Devil-Doll did such poor business that there was no market prospects for The Mask of Fu Manchu. It was released in 1992 with about one minute and five seconds removed, predominantly of Karloff's dialogue scenes such as "Yes, this is only the beginning! I will wipe out your whole accursed white race!" and "Would you all have maidens like this for your wives? Then conquer and breed! Kill the white man and take his women!" The later DVD releases of the film have restored these scenes.

The film was announced for release on Blu-ray by the Warner Archive Collection in April 2024.

== Reception ==
From contemporary reviews, The American Magazine proclaimed the film as "a chilling, thrilling hour of hair-raising entertainment" while Britain's Film Weekly praised it as a "blood-and-thunder thriller of nightmare dimensions." Film historian Gregory William Mank stated that most critics were aghast at the film. Variety proclaimed that "this time they should have let the doctor rest in peace", finding Morley miscast, Karloff was still performing as Frankenstein's monster, while Myrna Loy was "playing stock".

In The BFI Companion to Crime, the authors described the film as "the most elaborate film featuring the character", attributing this to the casting of Karloff and Loy, while finding the plot "disjointed, even by penny-dreadful standards. Mask of Fu Manchu is not the definitive, nor even the best, Fu Manchu film, but it is the most delirious." Kim Newman writing for Empire found Karloff "camply compelling" and that the film's plot "gets lost amid a procession of bizarre, perverse incident."

== Legacy ==
Karloff returned to Universal following his work on the film to begin work on The Mummy (1932). Karloff reflected on the film later, declaring that "It was shambles, it really was–it was simply ridiculous."

The character of Fu Manchu would be seen in films in various incarnations. This included radio dramas such as The Shadow of Fu Manchu, film serials such as Drums of Fu Manchu, a Spanish production El Otro Fu Manchu, television with The Adventures of Dr. Fu Manchu (1956), and other feature films starring Christopher Lee as Fu Manchu, starting with The Face of Fu Manchu (1965).

The film is recognized by American Film Institute in these lists:

- 2003: AFI's 100 Years...100 Heroes & Villains:
  - Dr. Fu Manchu – Nominated Villain

== See also ==
- Boris Karloff filmography
- Pre-Code Hollywood
