= List of works by Sax Rohmer =

Sax Rohmer bibliography
- Novels↙: 42
- Collections↙: 9
- Plays↙: 4
- Music↙: 7
- Non-fiction↙: 3

Sax Rohmer (pseudonym of Arthur Henry "Sarsfield" Ward; 1883–1959) was a British writer of songs sketches, plays and stories. Born in Birmingham to Irish immigrant parents, the family moved to London in about 1886, where Rohmer was schooled. His formal education finished in 1901, following the death of his alcoholic mother. After attempting careers in the civil service, as well as the banking, journalism and gas industries, Rohmer began writing comic songs, monologues and sketches for music hall performers, including Little Tich and George Robey. Rohmer's first book was Pause!, a series of sketches conceived by Robey and written by Rohmer, which was published anonymously in 1910; his second book was the ghost-written biography of Little Tich, published with Tich's real name, Harry Relph.

In 1913 The Mystery of Dr. Fu-Manchu was published, a novel that introduced Dr. Fu Manchu, described by Rohmer as "the yellow peril incarnate in one man". The book brought the author popularity and wealth; in total he wrote 13 Fu Manchu books during his lifetime and, although he killed the character off more than once, public pressure always demanded his return. Fu Manchu is the character with which Rohmer "remains most strongly identified" and was described by Rohmer's biographer Will Murray as one of the literary characters that "has achieved universal acceptance and popularity which will not be forgotten", along with Sherlock Holmes, Tarzan and Dracula. From 1951 onwards, Rohmer published five novels with Sumuru as the central antagonist; she was a female counterpart of Fu Manchu and her novels, too, were both popular and successful.

Rohmer contracted the Asian flu in 1958 and died the following year after related complications. His best-known character has outlived him through numerous film, radio and television interpretations.

== Songs and monologues ==
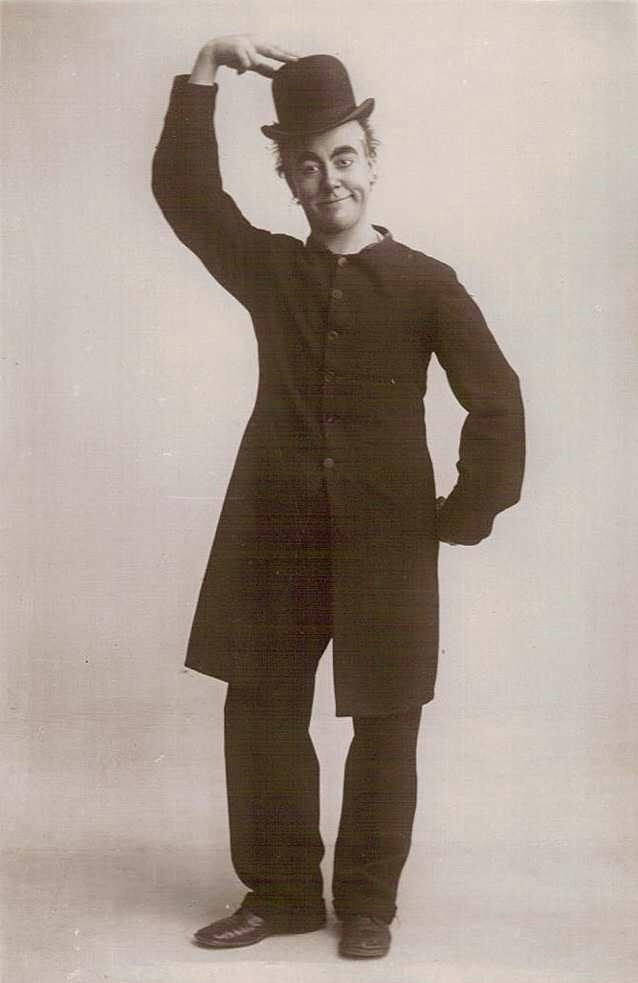
George Robey, for whom Rohmer wrote songs and sketches

Songs and musical monologues by Rohmer
Title	Year of first publication	First edition publisher	Notes	Ref.
"Bang went the Chance of a Lifetime!"	1908	Francis, Day and Hunter, London		
"Tom Took Tickets for Two"	1909	Francis, Day and Hunter, London		
"I've Been Looking for You for Years, and Years and Years"	1909	Francis, Day and Hunter, London	Written and composed by R. Noel, Rohmer & T. W. Thurban	
"The Camels' Parade : A Desert Arabesque"	1910	Ascherberg, Hopwood & Crew, London	Later arranged for military band by M. Retford.	
"Aboo Tabah"	1910	None listed	Written by Rohmer and T. W. Thurban	
"The Pigtail of Li Fang Fu"	1919	Reynolds & Co, London	Musical monologue; written and composed by Rohmer. Transcription for piano arranged by T. W. Thurban	
"Orange Blossoms: A Chinese Tale"	1921	Reynolds & Co, London	Musical monologue	

== Non-fiction ==
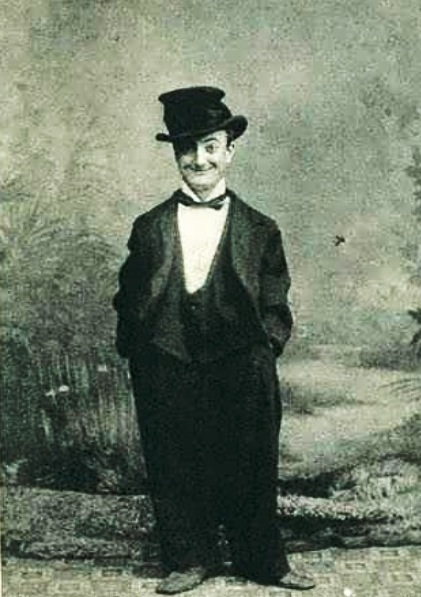
Little Tich, whose biography Rohmer ghost wrote

Non-fiction works by Rohmer
Title	Year of first publication	First edition publisher	Category	Notes	Ref.
Pause!	1910	Greening (London)	Stories and essays	Published anonymously; some material co-conceived with George Robey	
Little Tich: A Book of Travels and Wanderings	1911	Greening (London)	Anecdotes and sketches	Ghostwriter collaborator on autobiography of Little Tich, published under Tich's name only	
The Romance of Sorcery	1914	Methuen Publishing, London	Occult history	A history of the occult and its main practitioners	
Apologia Alchymiae	1925	John M. Watkins, London	Occult	A re-statement of Alchemy by Richard Watson Councell, M.D. with a preface by Sax Rohmer	

== Novels and short story collections ==
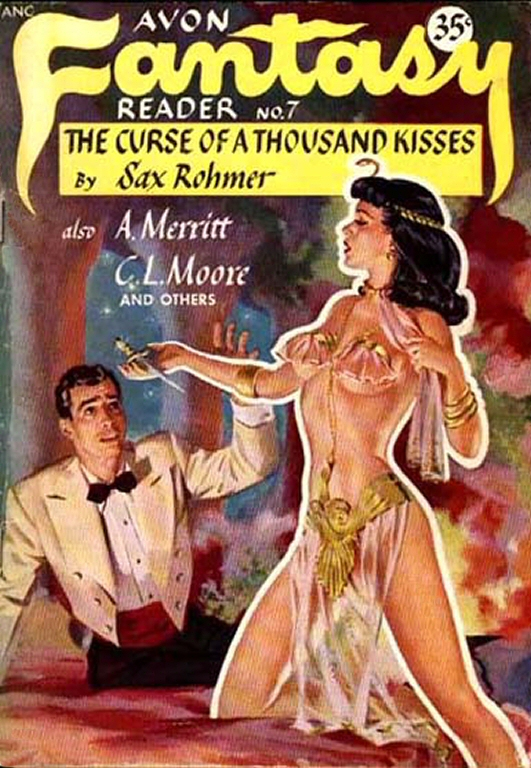
"The Curse of a Thousand Kisses", a short story published in one of Sax Rohmer's collections, was later republished in a 1948 issue of Avon Fantasy Reader.

"A tall, dignified Chinese, wearing a fur-collared overcoat and a fur cap, alighted and walked in ... For a mere instant while the light flooded out from the opened door, I had seen the face of the man in the fur cap, and in that instant my imaginary monster came to life ... I knew that I had seen Dr Fu-Manchu! His face was the living embodiment of Satan".

— Rohmer, describing the moment of inspiration for Fu Manchu.

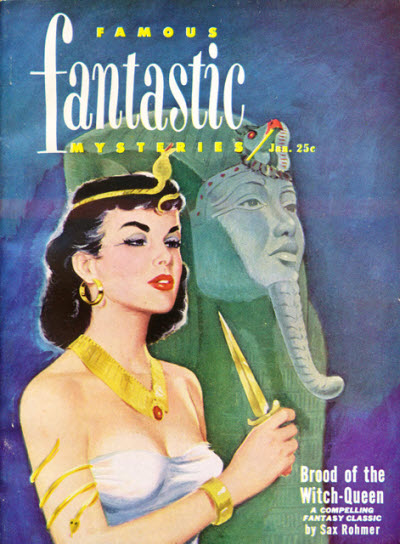
Brood of the Witch-Queen was reprinted in the January 1951 issue of Famous Fantastic Mysteries

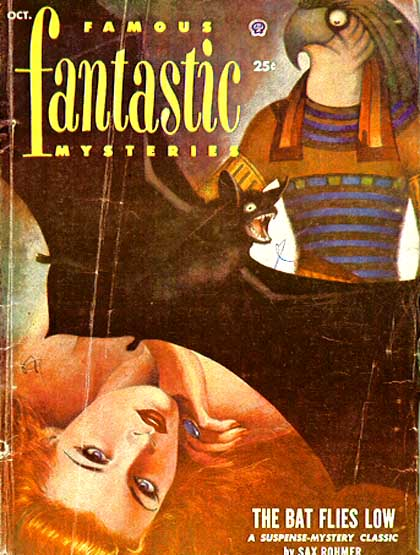
The Bat Flies Low, one of the few Rohmer novels never issued in a paperback edition, was reprinted in the January 1951 issue of Famous Fantastic Mysteries

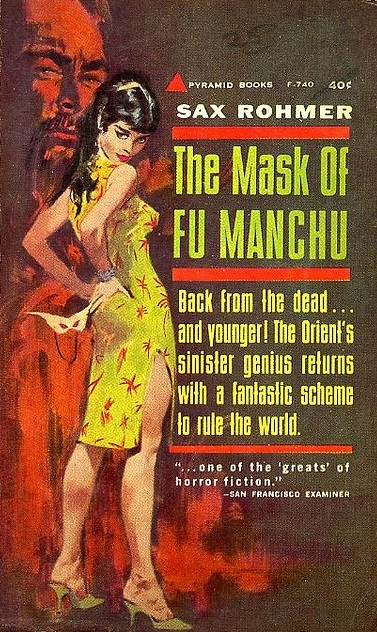
Cover of "The Mask of Fu Manchu" by Sax Rohmer. Illustration by Ronnie Lesser, 1962.

Novels and story collections by Rohmer
Title	Year of first publication	First edition publisher	Notes	Ref.
The Mystery of Dr. Fu-Manchu	1913	Methuen Publishing, London	In later editions the hyphen was dropped from Fu Manchu's name and the book's title. Published in the U.S. as The Insidious Dr. Fu-Manchu.	
The Sins of Séverac Bablon	1914	Cassell, London		
The Yellow Claw	1915	McBride, New York	Published in the UK by Methuen Publishing, London (1915)	
The Devil Doctor	1916	Methuen Publishing, London	also published as The Return of Dr Fu-Manchu	
The Exploits of Captain O'Hagan	1916	Jarrold Publishing, London	Short story collection	
The Si-Fan Mysteries	1917	Methuen Publishing, London	also published as The Hand of Fu-Manchu	
Brood of the Witch-Queen	1918	Pearson, London		
Tales of Secret Egypt	1918	Methuen Publishing, London	Short story collection	
The Orchard of Tears	1918	Methuen Publishing, London		
The Quest of the Sacred Slipper	1919	Pearson, London		
Dope: A Story of Chinatown and the Drug Traffic	1919	Cassell, London		
The Golden Scorpion	1919	Methuen Publishing, London		
The Dream Detective, Being Some Account of the Methods of Moris Klaw	1920	Jarrold Publishing, London	Short story collection	
The Green Eyes of Bâst	1920	Cassell, London		
The Haunting of Low Fennel	1920	Pearson, London	Short story collection	
Bat-Wing	1921	Cassell, London		
Fire-Tongue	1921	Cassell, London		
Tales of Chinatown	1922	Cassell, London	Short story collection	
Grey Face	1924	Cassell, London		
Yellow Shadows	1925	Cassell, London		
Moon of Madness	1927	Doubleday, Page, Garden City, NY	Published in the UK by Cassell, London (1927)	
She Who Sleeps	1928	Doubleday, Doran, Garden City, NY	Published in the UK by Cassell, London (1928)	
The Emperor of America	1929	Doubleday, Doran, Garden City, NY	Published in the UK by Cassell, London (1929)	
The Day the World Ended	1930	Doubleday, Doran, Garden City, NY	Published in the UK by Cassell, London (1930)	
Daughter of Fu Manchu	1931	Doubleday, Doran, Garden City, NY	Published in the UK by Cassell, London (1931)	
Yu'an Hee See Laughs	1932	Doubleday, Doran, Garden City, NY	Published in the UK by Cassell, London (1932)	
Tales of East and West	1932	Cassell, London	Short story collection	
The Mask of Fu Manchu	1932	Doubleday, Doran, Garden City, NY	Published in the UK by Cassell, London (1933)	
Fu Manchu's Bride	1933	Doubleday, Doran, Garden City, NY	Published in the UK as The Bride of Fu Manchu, Cassell, London (1933)	
The Trail of Fu Manchu	1934	Doubleday, Garden City, NY	Published in the UK by Cassell, London (1934)	
The Bat Flies Low	1935	Doubleday, Doran, Garden City, NY	Published in the UK by Cassell, London (1935)	
President Fu Manchu	1936	Doubleday, Doran, Garden City, NY	Published in the UK by Cassell, London (1936)	
White Velvet	1936	Doubleday, Doran, Garden City, NY	Published in the UK by Cassell, London (1936)	
Salute to Bazarada and Other Stories	1939	Cassell, London	Short story collection	
The Drums of Fu Manchu	1939	Doubleday, Garden City, NY	Published in the UK by Cassell, London (1939)	
The Island of Fu Manchu	1941	Doubleday, New York	Published in the UK by Cassell, London (1941)	
Seven Sins	1943	McBride, New York	Published in the UK by Cassell, London (1944)	
Egyptian Nights	1944	Hale, London	Short story collection	
Shadow of Fu Manchu	1948	Doubleday, Doran, New York	Published in the UK by Jenkins, London (1949)	
Hangover House	1949	Random House, New York	Published in the UK by Jenkins, London (1950)	
Nude in Mink	1950	Fawcett Books, New York	Published in the UK as The Sins of Sumuru, by Jenkins, London (1950)	
Wulfheim	1950	Jarrold Publishing, London	Published under the pseudonym Michael Furey	
Sumuru	1951	Fawcett Books, New York	Published in the UK as The Slaves of Sumuru, by Jenkins, London (1952)	
The Fire Goddess	1952	Fawcett Books, New York	Published in the UK as Virgin in Flames, by Jenkins, London (1953)	
The Moon is Red	1954	Jenkins, London		
Return of Sumuru	1954	Fawcett Books, New York	Published in the UK as Sand and Satin, by Jenkins, London (1955)	
Sinister Madonna	1956	Jenkins, London		
Re-Enter Fu Manchu	1957	Fawcett Books, New York	Published in the UK as Re-Enter Dr. Fu Manchu, by Jenkins, London (1957)	
Emperor Fu Manchu	1959	Jenkins, London		
The Secret of Holm Peel and Other Strange Stories	1970	Ace Books, New York	Published posthumously; short story collection	
The Wrath of Fu Manchu and Other Stories	1973	Stacey, London	Published posthumously; short story collection	

== Series ==
=== Dr. Fu Manchu ===
There are 13 novels, 4 short stories, and an unpublished play about Dr. Fu Manchu and his nemesis, Denis Nayland Smith.

1. The Mystery of Dr. Fu-Manchu (The Insidious Dr. Fu Manchu) (1913)
2. The Devil Doctor (The Return of Dr. Fu-Manchu) (1916)
3. The Si-Fan Mysteries (The Hand of Fu-Manchu) (1917)
4. The Daughter of Fu Manchu (1931)
5. The Mask of Fu Manchu (1932)
6. The Bride of Fu Manchu (1933)
7. The Trail of Fu Manchu (1934)
8. President Fu Manchu (1936)
9. The Drums of Fu Manchu (1939)
10. The Island of Fu Manchu (1941)
11. The Shadow of Fu Manchu (1948)
12. "The Wrath of Fu Manchu" (1952)
13. Re-Enter Dr. Fu Manchu (July 1957)
14. "The Eyes of Fu Manchu" (October 1957)
15. "The Word of Fu Manchu" (1958)
16. "The Mind of Fu Manchu" (February 1959)
17. Emperor Fu Manchu (October 1959)

==== Denis Nayland Smith ====
There are 3 short stories featuring Denis Nayland Smith in which Dr. Fu Manchu does not appear

1. "The Blue Monkey" in The Haunting of Low Fennel (1920) (The identities of Nayland Smith and Dr. Petrie are strongly hinted, though not explicitly stated in this story.)
2. "The Mark of the Monkey" (Brittania & Eve, April 1931)
3. "The Turkish Yataghan" (Colliers's, January 1932)

==== Gaston Max ====
There are 4 novels featuring the Parisian detective, Gaston Max.

1. The Yellow Claw (1915)
2. The Golden Scorpion (1919) - related to Fu Manchu series by the Si-Fan organisation and Fo-Hi. Fu Manchu makes an unnamed appearance in an only official crossover
3. The Day the World Ended (1930)
4. Seven Sins (1943)

==== Unpublished Play ====
- Fu Manchu: A Chinese Melodrama (1919) - co-authored with Willard Mack

==== Authorised Continuations by Cay Van Ash ====
The 2 novels are the only continuations by the late author who knew Rohmer personally, was his friend, and co-wrote Rohmer's biography with his widow, Elizabeth in 1972. They take place between the third and the fourth novels.

1. Ten Years Beyond Baker Street (1984)
2. The Fires of Fu Manchu (1987)

=== Sumuru ===
1. Nude in Mink (The Sins of Sumuru) (1950)
2. The Slaves of Sumuru (1951)
3. Virgin in Flames (The Fire Goddess) (1952)
4. Sand and Satin (The Return of Sumuru) (1954)
5. Sinister Madonna (1956)

John Robert Colombo compiled the Sumuru Omnibus in 2011.

=== Red Kerry ===
1. Dope: A Story of Chinatown and the Drug Traffic (1919)
2. "The Daughter of Huang Chow" in Tales of Chinatown (1922)
3. "Kerry's Kid" in Tales of Chinatown (1922)
4. Yellow Shadows (1925)

=== Paul Harley ===
1. Bat-Wing (1921)
2. Fire-Tongue (1921)
3. "The House of the Golden Joss" in Tales of Chinatown (1922)
4. "The Man with the Shaven Skull" in Tales of Chinatown (1922)

=== The Crime Magnet ===
There are 15 short stories and a novel featuring Major Bernard de Treville, better known as the Crime Magnet, collected in The Complete Cases of the Crime Magnet

1. "The Black and White Bag" September 11 and 12, 1937.
2. "The Broken Ikon" September 18 and 19, 1937.
3. "An Egyptian Romance" September 25 and 26, 1937.
4. "The Five Musketeers" December 31, 1937 and January 2, 1938.
5. "Count D'Ambra's Widow" January 8, 1938.
6. "The Persian Portfolio" January 15 and 16, 1938.
7. "Cinderella's Slipper" February 26 and 27, 1938.
8. "The Dutch Cheese" 18 June 1938
9. The Panama Plot (10 September-1 October 1938) - 4 parts
10. "The Mystery of the Panelled Room" July 29 and 30, 1939.
11. "Exit the Princess" August 5 and 6, 1939.
12. "The Mystic Turban" August 12 and 13, 1939.
13. "The Elusive Jackdaw" August 19 and 20, 1939.
14. "The Oversized Trunk" October 21, 1944.
15. "The Stolen Peach-Stone" November 18, 1944. A rewritten version of "The Green Scarab" (written 1935, published posthumously June 1966 in Edgar Wallace Mystery Magazine)
16. "The Secret of the Ruins" May 13, 1945

=== Bimbashi Baruk ===
There are 10 short stories featuring this Egyptian major, collected in Bimbashi Baruk of Egypt (Egyptian Nights) (1944)

1. "Mystery Strikes at Ragstaff Hill" (Collier's, May 31, 1941 as "A Heart in Her Hands")
2. "The Bimbashi Meets Up with A 14" (Collier's, August 23, 1941 as "Pool-o'-the-Moon"')
3. "Murder Strikes in Lychgate" (Collier's, April 11, 1941 as "Four and Twenty Cobblers")
4. "The Laughing Buddha Finds a Purchaser" (Collier's, February 21, 1942 as "Laughing Buddha")
5. "Warning from Rose of the Desert"
6. "Lotus Yuan Loses Her Vanity Case" (Collier's, September 19, 1942 as "Blue Anemones")
7. "The Scarab of Lapis Lazuli" (Collier's November 7, 1942 as "Serpent Wind")
8. "Vengeance at the Lily Pool" (Collier's, February 13, 1942 as "The Man Who Killed Blackbirds")
9. "Adventure in the Libyan Desert"
10. "Pool-o'-the-Moon Sees Bimbashi Baruk"

=== Moris Klaw ===
There are 10 short stories featuring this detective and ghost-breaking hero, collected in The Dream Detective (1920)

1. "Case of the Tragedies in the Greek Room" (The New Magazine, April 1913)
2. "Case of the Potsherd of Anubis" (The New Magazine, May 1913)
3. "Case of the Crusader's Ax" (The New Magazine, June 1913)
4. "Case of the Ivory Statue" (The New Magazine, July 1913)
5. "Case of the Blue Rajah" (The New Magazine, August 1913)
6. "Case of the Whispering Poplars" (The New Magazine, September 1913)
7. "Case of the Chord in G" (The New Magazine, October 1913)
8. "Case of the Headless Mummies" (The New Magazine, November 1913)
9. "Case of the Haunting Of Grange" (The New Magazine, December 1913)
10. "Case of the Veil of Isis" (The New Magazine, January 1914)

== Plays ==
Plays by Rohmer
Title	First performance	Notes	Ref.
Round in Fifty	6 March 1922	by Rohmer and Julian & Lauri Wylie; first performed at the Cardiff Empire, Cardiff	
The Eye of Siva	8 August 1923	First performed at the New Theatre, London. Revived: Scala Theatre, 16 January 1933	
Fu Manchu: A Chinese Melodrama	22 August 1927	by Rohmer and Willard Mack; originally written for Broadway in 1919, but not performed until Grand Opera House, Cincinnati, OH. Produced and directed by Stuart Walker	
Secret Egypt	4 August 1928	First performed at the Q Theatre, London	
The Nightingale	15 July 1947	by Rohmer and Michael Martin Harvey; first performed at the Prince's Theatre, London	

== Sources ==
- Bickers, Robert (2004). "Ward, Arthur Henry [Arthur Sarsfield Ward; pseud. Sax Rohmer]". Oxford Dictionary of National Biography (online ed.). Oxford University Press. doi:10.1093/ref:odnb/39472. (Subscription, Wikipedia Library access or UK public library membership required.)
- Lofts, W.O.G.; Adley, D.J. (June 1990). "Sax Rohmer: Creator of 'Dr. Fu Manchu'". The Book and Magazine Collector (75). Diamond Publishing Group.
- Murray, Will (1988). "Sax Rohmer (Arthur Henry Sarsfield Ward)". In Benstock, Bernard; Staley, Thomas (eds.). British Mystery Writers, 1860–1919. Detroit: Gale Research. ISBN 978-0-8103-1748-2.
- Van Ash, Cay; Sax Rohmer, Elizabeth (1972). Master of Villainy: A Biography of Sax Rohmer. Tom Stacey. UPC 978-0-85468-299-7.
