= Dope (novel) =

Sax Rohmer novel

Dope is a 1919 novel by Sax Rohmer set in the Limehouse area of London. It is not a Fu Manchu novel, and concerns itself with opium and cocaine. It is based on the story of Billie Carleton, a young English actress whose scandalous lifestyle ended with her death from a drug overdose in 1918.

== Adaptations ==
The novel was adapted into comics by Trina Robbins between 1981 and 1983 in Eclipse Magazine and Eclipse Monthly. IDW Publishing published a collected edition of this work in 2017, with a postface by Jon B. Cooke.

== See also ==
- List of works by Sax Rohmer
