= The Shadow of Fu Manchu =

Radio drama

The Shadow of Fu Manchu is an adventure radio drama adapted from the first nine Fu Manchu novels by Sax Rohmer. The syndicated series aired from 1939 to 1940 in 15-minute installments.

== Characters and story ==
Fu Manchu (Harold Huber) was a diabolical criminal mastermind. British official Nayland Smith (Hanley Stafford), assisted by Dr. Petrie (Gale Gordon), set out to stop Fu Manchu at any cost. In Radio Crime Fighters (2002), Jim Cox wrote:

The plots of Rohmer's insidious figure and Smith and Petrie's attempts to thwart the archenemy formed a repetitive theme in the storyline. A stunningly exotic Karamaneh became the slave girl of the evil doctor; an objective of the combatants was to secure her release. The series, though brief, is memorable, and focused on one of the most effective villains to surface in adolescent radio.
