= Killer Shark =

1950 film by Budd Boetticher

- Film poster
- Directed by: Oscar Boetticher
- Screenplay by: Charles Lang
- Produced by: Ace Herman; Roddy McDowall; Lindsley Parsons
- Starring: Roddy McDowall; Laurette Luez; Roland Winters
- Cinematography: William A. Sickner
- Edited by: Leonard W. Herman
- Music by: Edward J. Kay
- Production company: Monogram Pictures
- Distributed by: Monogram Pictures
- Release date: March 19, 1950 (USA)
- Running time: 76 minutes
- Country: United States
- Language: English

Killer Shark is a 1950 American B movie directed by Budd Boetticher and starring Roddy McDowall, Laurette Luez and Roland Winters. Charles Lang scripted the film and also appears in it.

== Plot summary ==
Ted White joins his estranged father Jeffrey aboard his shark-hunting boat. When Jeffrey and one of the crew are attacked and injured by a shark, Ted assembles a makeshift crew that proves to be disloyal, attempting to take control of the boat and kill Ted. As they approach the shore, Ted is drugged, and while he is unconscious, the catch is taken from the ship by the crew's accomplice. With the help of his father's crew, they confront the thieves, retrieve the illicit money and save Jeffrey's ship.

== Cast ==
- Roddy McDowall as Ted White
- Laurette Luez as Maria
- Roland Winters as Jeffrey White
- Edward Norris as Ramon, a crewman
- Rick Vallin as Joe, a crewman
- Douglas Fowley as Louie Bracado
- Nacho Galindo as Maestro, the cook
- Ralf Harolde as Slattery
- Dick Moore as Jonesy
- Ted Hecht as Gano, a crewman
- Charles Lang as Mack McCann
- Robert Espinoza as Pinon, the boy
- John Sebastian as Tony, a crewman (as Julio Sebastian)
- Tom Coleman as a seaman
- Julian Rivero as the Doctor
- George Slocum as Capt. Hansen
- Frank Sully as Patrick, the bartender
- Ken Terrell as Barroom Tough in Black

== Production ==
Budd Boetticher later recalled: "[The film] was a small picture with Roddy McDowall as the star, and I just loved him. He always had his mother and father with him on the set, but he was just about to have his 21st birthday. So we went out on location on purpose, so that he could get out from underneath their jurisdiction and see some girls here and there. So we made the picture in Baja, California, and Roddy was no virgin after that."
