= Laurette Luez =

American actress (1928–1999)

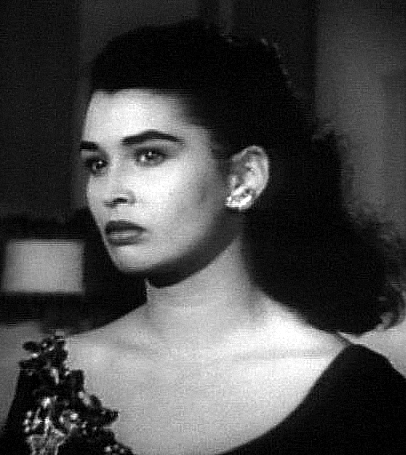
- Laurette Luez in D.O.A. (1950)
- Born: Loretta Mary Luiz; August 19, 1928; Honolulu, Hawaii, U.S.
- Died: September 12, 1999 (aged 71); Milton, Florida, U.S.
- Occupations: Actor, commercial model
- Years active: 1944–1964
- Spouse(s): Robert Creel (1956–1983; divorced); 2 children Edward A. Harrison (1950–1951, annulment); Gregg C. Tallas (1950–1950; divorced); Philip Sudano (1947–1948; divorced); 1 child

Laurette Luez (born Loretta Mary Luiz; August 19, 1928 – September 12, 1999) was an American supporting actress and successful commercial model who appeared in films and on television during a 20-year career. She was a widely known Hollywood celebrity during the 1950s, owing much to publicity about her social life. She is best known for her supporting role as photographic model Marla Rakubian in Rudolph Maté's 1950 film noir D.O.A..

== Early life ==
Luez was born in Honolulu, Hawaii, the second of three children to Frank and Francesca Luiz (née Clancy), vaudeville singers and dancers who performed traditional Hawaiian and Spanish music. Luez's father was from Hawaii and had Portuguese ancestry. Her mother was Australian, the daughter of an actor. Luez first showed up on stage doing a hula dance at age three. In July 1935 the family left Honolulu on the SS Mariposa to settle in Los Angeles. That same year, six-year-old Loretta performed for Sultan Ibrahim of Johor, who was known as one of the wealthiest men in the world at that time.

== Hollywood career ==
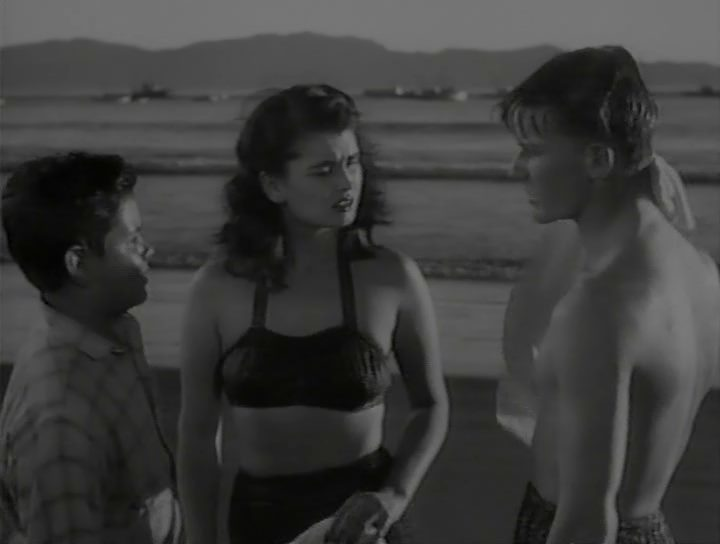
Dick Moore, Laurette Luez and Roddy McDowell in Killer Shark (1950)

About working with Errol Flynn, Luez said:

Errol and I play our love scenes through the window and do not kiss. But we took stills embracing each other. They asked me if I enjoyed working that way with Errol and I told them it was very, very disturbing, to say the least.

In 1949, she participated in a later famous Life magazine photo layout, in which she posed with other up-and-coming actresses, Marilyn Monroe, Lois Maxwell, Cathy Downs, Suzanne Dalbert, Enrica Soma and Jane Nigh.

From that time forward she was cast mostly in exotic, sexy character roles in films and television. In 1953, she appeared in Siren of Bagdad as a dancing slave girl. The following year, she played a small role in the Bowery Boys film Jungle Gents, opposite Huntz Hall's character "Sach" (her one line was "Kiss, kiss, kiss").

In 1956, she appeared in another exotic slave-girl role as Karamaneh in the syndicated TV series The Adventures of Dr. Fu Manchu. She also was a regular on The Donald O'Connor Show (1954–1955).

Luez left the film industry in 1965.

== Marriages ==
- Actor Philip Sudano (August 16, 1947, Los Angeles, California; divorced 1948), with whom she had her first son, Alexander Eden.
- Greek director Gregg Tallas (1950, Las Vegas, Nevada; the marriage lasted three months, from June to September 1950); at the time Tallas said he hoped to open a production company in Greece featuring Luez as his star.
- Real estate investor Edward A. Harrison (October 30, 1951, "secretly" in Tijuana, Mexico; annulled early 1952). Luez claimed Harrison had not divorced his former wife and also said he threatened both her life and film career.
- Robert Creel (1956; divorced 1983), with whom she had two children, a son, Craig T. (born September 14, 1962, Los Angeles) and a daughter, Claudette M. (born May 1, 1968, Los Angeles).

== Last years ==
By 1990 Luez was living in the Los Feliz district of Los Angeles with her sister Lei, along with a nephew. Luez died on September 12, 1999, in Milton, Florida, aged 71, from undisclosed causes.

== Filmography ==
Year	Title	Role	Notes
1944	The Story of Dr. Wassell	Pretty Javanese Girl	Uncredited
1946	Anna and the King of Siam	Wife of King	Uncredited
1948	Unfaithfully Yours	Lannie - Hatcheck Girl	Uncredited
1949	D.O.A.	Marla Rakubian	
1950	Killer Shark	Maria	
1950	Love That Brute	Moll	Uncredited
1950	Prehistoric Women	Tigri	
1950	Kim	Laluli	
1952	African Treasure	Lita Sebastian	
1953	Siren of Bagdad	Orena	
1953	Paris Model	Lisa	
1954	Valley of the Kings	Native Girl	Uncredited
1954	Jungle Gents	Anatta	
1954	The Adventures of Hajji Baba	Meriam	Uncredited
1956	The Adventures of Fu Manchu	Karamaneh	
1961	Man-Trap	Mexican Woman	Uncredited
1961	Flower Drum Song	TV Mexican Girl	Uncredited
1963	The Ballad of a Gunfighter	Felina	
