= The Adventures of Dr. Fu Manchu =

American syndicated TV adventure series (1956)

- Also known as: The Adventures of Fu Manchu
- Genre: Adventure
- Directed by: Franklin Adreon; William Witney
- Starring: Glen Gordon; Lester Matthews; Clark Howat
- Country of origin: United States
- Original language: English
- No. of seasons: 1
- No. of episodes: 13

Production
- Production company: Hollywood Television Service

Original release
- Network: Syndication
- Release: September 3 – November 26, 1956

The Adventures of Dr. Fu Manchu is a syndicated American television series that aired in 1956. The show was produced by Hollywood Television Service, a subsidiary of Republic Pictures.

== Cast and characters ==
- Glen Gordon as Dr. Fu Manchu
- Lester Matthews as Sir Denis Nayland Smith
- Clark Howat as Dr. John Petrie
- Carla Balenda as Nurse Betty Leonard
- Laurette Luez as Karamaneh
- John George as Kolb.

== Production ==
=== Development ===
Early in the 1950s, an NBC pilot starring John Carradine and Cedric Hardwicke was made, but the sponsors were disappointed in the scripts, and the TV series never materialized.

In 1955, Republic Pictures paid US$4 million to Sax Rohmer and announced they would film 78 episodes, but only 13 were made following a protracted court battle over the rights between Rohmer and the producers.

=== Details ===
Each episode would start off with Dr. Fu Manchu and Nayland Smith playing a game of chess with the narrator telling us, "Black and white. Life and death. Good and evil. Two sides of a chess game. Two forces of the universe, one magnificent, the other sinister. It is said the devil plays for men's souls. So does Dr. Fu Manchu, Satan himself, evil incarnate." At the end of each episode, after Nayland Smith and Dr. Petrie had foiled Dr. Fu Manchu's latest fiendish scheme, Dr. Fu Manchu would be seen breaking a black chess piece as the closing credits rolled.

The series was directed by noted serial director Franklin Adreon, as well as by William Witney. Unlike the Sherlock Holmes/Dr. Watson type relationship of the films, the series featured Smith as a law enforcement official and Petrie as a staff member of the Surgeon General.

The series was similar in some ways to a serial, but each episode ended in a resolution rather than a cliffhanger. Republic sent out a film crew to Hong Kong to shoot background footage and supplied stock footage from its library of films.

== Episodes ==
No.	Title	Original release date
1	"The Prisoner of Dr. Fu Manchu"	September 3, 1956
2	"The Golden God of Dr. Fu Manchu"	September 10, 1956
3	"The Secret of Fu Manchu"	September 17, 1956
4	"The Vengeance of Dr. Fu Manchu"	September 24, 1956
5	"Dr. Fu Manchu, Incorporated"	October 1, 1956
6	"The Plague of Dr. Fu Manchu"	October 8, 1956
7	"The Slave of Dr. Fu Manchu"	October 15, 1956
8	"Dr. Fu Manchu's Raid"	October 22, 1956
9	"The Death Ships of Dr. Fu Manchu"	October 29, 1956
10	"The Counterfeiters of Dr. Fu Manchu"	November 5, 1956
11	"The Master Plan of Dr. Fu Manchu"	November 12, 1956
12	"The Satellites of Dr. Fu Manchu"	November 19, 1956
13	"The Assassins of Dr. Fu Manchu"	November 26, 1956

== Feature films ==
Several of the episodes were put together into feature films that were released in Germany.
