= Jungle Gents =

1954 film by Edward Bernds

- Directed by: Edward Bernds
- Written by: Edward Bernds; Elwood Ullman
- Produced by: Ben Schwalb
- Starring: Leo Gorcey; Huntz Hall; David Gorcey; Bernard Gorcey
- Cinematography: Harry Neumann
- Edited by: Sam Fields
- Music by: Marlin Skiles
- Production company: Allied Artists Pictures
- Distributed by: Allied Artists Pictures
- Release date: September 5, 1954
- Running time: 64 minutes
- Country: United States
- Language: English

Jungle Gents is a 1954 American comedy film directed by Edward Bernds and starring The Bowery Boys. The film was released on September 5, 1954 by Allied Artists and is the thirty-fifth film in the series and the film debut of Clint Walker in an uncredited appearance at the end of the film.

== Plot ==
Sach obtains the ability to smell diamonds after he starts taking medication for a sinus infection. He and the boys go off to Africa in search of wealth, with Grimshaw as their guide. A gang of thieves comes along and tries to steal any diamonds that they may find. They capture the boys and insist they help the thieves find diamonds. The boys are unwilling to help so they try to get Sach to catch a cold so he cannot smell any diamonds. Unfortunately the thieves enlist a witch doctor to cure Sach. A native jungle girl, Anatta, who only wants a "kiss, kiss, kiss" from Sach, comes along and rescues them.

== Cast ==
=== The Bowery Boys ===
- Leo Gorcey as Terrance Aloysius 'Slip' Mahoney
- Huntz Hall as Horace Debussy 'Sach' Jones
- David Gorcey as Chuck Anderson (Credited as David Condon)
- Bennie Bartlett as Butch Williams

=== Remaining cast ===
- Bernard Gorcey as Louie Dumbrowski
- Patrick O'Moore as Grimshaw
- Rudolph Anders as Dr. Goebel
- Laurette Luez as Anatta
- Clint Walker (as Anatta's mate)
- Emory Parnell as Police Capt. Daly

== Production ==
The jungle sets are the same ones used for the 1949-1955 film series starring Bomba, the Jungle Boy.

== Home media ==
Warner Archives released the film on made-to-order DVD in the United States as part of "The Bowery Boys, Volume Four" on August 26, 2014.

Preceded by The Bowery Boys Meet the Monsters; 1954	'The Bowery Boys' movies 1946-1958	Succeeded by Bowery to Bagdad; 1955
