= The Ballad of a Gunfighter =

- Directed by: Bill Ward
- Screenplay by: Bill Ward
- Produced by: Bill Ward
- Starring: Marty Robbins
- Music by: Marty Robbins
- Distributed by: Parade Pictures
- Release date: August 21, 1963 (San Angelo, Texas premiere)
- Running time: 83 minutes
- Country: United States
- Language: English

The Ballad of a Gunfighter is a 1963 Western film starring Marty Robbins. The film has two characters from Robbins' western ballads – Felina from El Paso, and Secora from San Angelo. The movie is set in 1800s San Angelo, Texas and premiered in that city on August 21, 1963.

== Plot ==
As an orchestra plays the melody of El Paso Marty rides his white horse over rugged terrain. He sees a group of men waiting along the road, goes past them, and comes to a rocky outcrop beside the road. A stagecoach comes by, Marty jumps onto the roof of the vehicle and has the driver throw a strongbox onto the ground. Marty jumps off the stagecoach and the stagecoach continues down the road. He whistles for his horse, shoots the lock off the strong box, gathers up sacks of gold, mounts his horse and rides away. The men he saw along the road chase after Marty, but he eludes them.

Marty rides into the town of San Angelo, Texas and a small boy named Miguelito rushes up to him and offers to tend to his tired horse. He dismounts and, when Miguelito is looking at his horse, Marty tosses a sack onto the street, and tells the boy that someone must have lost some money, and Miguelito should take it to the Padre, to give to the poor.

Marty goes into the cantina run by Felina. He buys drinks for everyone, and tells Felina he has gifts for all the girls who work there. One of the workers is Secora. Alan McCord, a crooked businessman, tells Marty he wants to join forces with him, since Marty was born in the area, and knows the terrain. Marty refuses the offer.

Later on Marty is out riding and sees Secora driving a buckboard, so he rides besides her. When they reach the river Secora begins undressing to go swimming, but Marty stops her, and tells her she should be ashamed for removing clothing in front of a man. Secora says men have taken advantage of her since she was a girl, and she is no lady.

Marty goes to see the Padre, and asks him to speak to Secora. The Padre says she comes to the church throughout the week to pray, and then he tells Marty that stealing is always wrong.

The local lawman, Sam, tells Alan that Marty got to the gold before Alan's men could steal it. Alan says the townspeople like Marty, and would hate anyone who kills him. Marty brings more presents for the girls at the cantina, and Secora is given a swimming garment with a knee-length skirt. Marty and Secora are seen swimming together, while she wears her swimming outfit. Marty proposes to her, but she feels she can't marry because of her past.

Secora tells Felina she no longer wants to live or work at the cantina, and Felina helps her get a job as a waitress at the hotel. As soon as Secora is no longer at the cantina Alan becomes interested in her, and asks Felina to talk to Secora for him. Felina tells Secora that when she worked at a cantina in El Paso an outlaw fell in love with her, but he was jealous, killed another man, and then he was killed.

Lawman Sam tells Alan that the governor will grant amnesty to anyone who joins the rangers, so Alan joins so he can be a lawman. Marty proposes to Secora a second time, but she refuses, so he says he will leave the area. The Padre tells Secora that Marty needs someone to love him.

Alan asks Secora to marry him and she agrees to do so. Then she changes her mind, and sends a man to find Marty and tell him to come back to San Angelo. He will know when and where to meet her. Secora tells Alan she won't marry him, and Alan says that Marty will be killed unless she and Alan marry.

Marty rides into town as the song San Angelo is sung in the background. What happens follows the story told in the song lyrics. Marty knows that there are gunmen waiting to kill him. Secora and Alan are both in an office room together, and Alan is watching her constantly. Marty dismounts and looks around. Secora runs out of the room and rushes to Marty's side. Alan comes out into the street, shoots Secora, and she falls to the ground. Marty draws his gun and shoots Alan until he runs out of bullets. Alan's men shoot Marty, and he falls beside Secora, who has just enough strength left to reach out and place her hand on top of Marty's hand before she dies.

Townspeople come out and stand around those who have died. The Padre and Miguelito are both distressed, but then the Padre sees that Marty's and Secora's hands are touching, and that causes him to smile.

== Cast ==
- Marty Robbins as Marty Robbins
- Traveler as Marty's White Horse
- Joyce Redd as Secora
- Bob Barron as Alan McCord
- Nestor Paiva as Padre
- Michael Davis as Miguelito
- Laurette Luez as Felina
- Jack Carney as Sam

== Production ==
Stuntman and horse trainer Bill Ward wanted to make his own film. He owned a trained white horse named Traveler, who had been a stunt double for Silver on The Lone Ranger television series. Ward gave Traveler second billing on The Ballad of a Gunfighter, which was the last film the horse was in.

The film was made near Kanab, Utah.
