= Glen Gordon =

American actor

Glen Charles Gordon (March 13, 1914 – September 16, 1977) was an American actor. Among other roles, Gordon played the role of Fu Manchu in the 1956 television series The Adventures of Dr. Fu Manchu.

He also starred in the S3E15 1961 episode of Gene Barry's TV Western series Bat Masterson, playing and wronged and revenge seeking former military corporal in "The Court Marshall of Major Mars".
