= Clark Howat =

American actor (1918–2009)

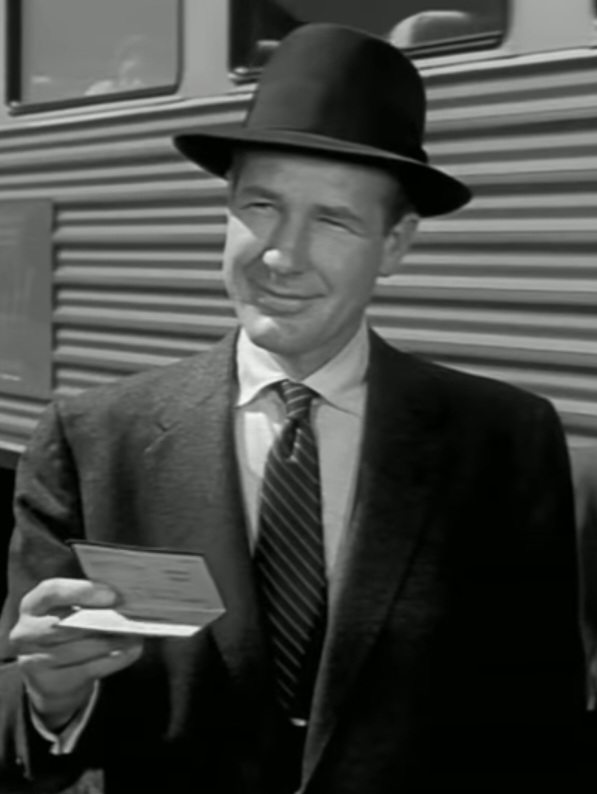
- Howat in Suddenly (1954)
- Born: John Clark Howat; January 22, 1918; Calaveras County, California, U.S.
- Died: October 30, 2009 (aged 91); Arroyo Grande, California, U.S.
- Occupation: Actor
- Spouse: Muriel Mansell (m. 1949)

John Clark Howat (January 22, 1918 – October 30, 2009) was an American film and television actor.

== Life and career ==
Howat was born in Calaveras County, California. He began his career in 1947, appearing in the Broadway play The Wanhope Building, playing the roles of the "Interviewer" and "Pilot".

Howat began his film career in July 1947, playing the role of the "Patron in Macy's Lunchroom" in the film Miracle on 34th Street. His early film career was mostly uncredited and co-starring roles.

His later credits include The Doctor and the Girl, Customs Agent, Airport, My Blue Heaven and California Passage, among others.

He began appearing on television in 1952, appearing in Beulah, playing the role of "Pete Bradley". In 1956, Howat played the main role of "Dr. Jack (John) Petrie" in the short-lived sitcom television series The Adventures of Dr. Fu Manchu. He also appeared in Dragnet, Leave It to Beaver, Highway Patrol, Alfred Hitchcock Presents, Navy Log, Tales of Wells Fargo, Bat Masterson and The Millionaire. He also wrote the episode "Walk a Crooked Line" for the crime drama television series The Detectives, in 1962.

Howat also starred or co-starred in other films: Billy Jack, playing the role of "Sheriff Cole", The Hitch-Hiker, playing the role of the "Government Agent", The Giant Claw, playing the role of "Maj. Bergen" and The High Powered Rifle, playing the role of "George Merkle".

In 1985, Howat retired, last appearing in the television series T.J. Hooker.

== Death ==
Howat died in October 2009 in Arroyo Grande, California, at the age of 91.

== Filmography ==
=== Film ===
Year	Title	Role	Notes
1947	Miracle on 34th Street	Patron in Macy's Lunchroom	Uncredited
1949	The Doctor and the Girl	Shelby, Intern	Uncredited
1950	Chain Lightning	Captain	Uncredited
1950	Women from Headquarters	Stephens	Uncredited
1950	Customs Agent	Agent Roy Phillips	Uncredited
1950	Once a Thief	Police Detective	Uncredited
1950	Kiss Tomorrow Goodbye	Intern	Uncredited
1950	My Blue Heaven	Studio Man	Uncredited
1950	California Passage	Croupier	Uncredited
1950	Gambling House	Nick	Uncredited
1951	Missing Women	Prison Desk Officer	Uncredited
1951	Only the Valiant	Lieutenant Underwood	Uncredited
1951	Fighting Coast Guard	Coast Guard Academy Cadet Upper-Classman	Uncredited
1951	Lost Continent	Naval Captain	Uncredited
1951	Saturday's Hero	Reporter	Uncredited
1951	All That I Have	Dr. George Wagnell	
1951	F.B.I. Girl	Whitey	Uncredited
1951	The Valparaiso Story		
1952	The Sniper	Police Photographer	Uncredited
1952	Steel Town	Al Lyon	Uncredited
1952	The Fabulous Senorita	Davis	Uncredited
1952	Paula	Intern Attendant	Uncredited
1952	Red Ball Express	Military Police Captain	Uncredited
1952	Rainbow 'Round My Shoulder	Disc Jockey	deleted scene (footage)
1952	It Grows on Trees	Man Examining Ledger	Uncredited
1952	Androcles and the Lion	Officer	Uncredited
1953	The Hitch-Hiker	Government Agent	
1953	Split Second	Lieutenant at Control Station	Uncredited
1953	The 49th Man	Sands	Uncredited
1953	City That Never Sleeps	Patrolman	Uncredited
1953	The Glass Web	Bob Warren	
1954	Security Risk		Uncredited
1954	Suddenly	Haggerty	
1955	Battle Cry	Marine Colonel	Uncredited
1955	The Eternal Sea	Thomas – Medical Officer	Uncredited
1955	Illegal	George Graves	
1956	The Houston Story	Police Detective Talbot	Uncredited
1956	The Man in the Gray Flannel Suit	Soldier	Uncredited
1956	Earth vs. the Flying Saucers	Sergeant Nash	Uncredited
1957	Mister Cory	Card Player	Uncredited
1957	The Giant Claw	Major Bergen	
1958	No Time for Sergeants	Lieutenant	Uncredited
1960	The High Powered Rifle	George Merkle	
1961	A Fever in the Blood	Airline Official	Uncredited
1963	Twilight of Honor	Reporter	Uncredited
1968	Prescription: Murder	Doctor	Uncredited
1970	Airport	Bert Weatherby	
1971	Billy Jack	Sheriff Cole	
1976	Eat My Dust!	George Poole Sr.	
1983	Money to Burn	Henderson	
1994	Running Hot	Judge	

=== Television ===
Year	Title	Role	Notes
1952	Beulah	Pete Bradley	Episode: "The New Arrival"
1952	Space Patrol	Manson	Episode: "Emergency Flight to Mercury"
1952	Racket Squad	Van Hayton	Episode: "One More Dream"
1952	The Unexpected	Gregory	Episode: "The Doctor Prescribes"
1952	Boston Blackie	Lang / Hanlon	2 episodes
1953	Chevron Theatre		Episode: "Death of a Smart Aleck"
1953	The Pepsi-Cola Playhouse		Episode: "Wait for Me Downstairs"
1953	The Revlon Mirror Theater	Episode: "Dreams Never Lie"	
1953	Adventures of Superman	Professor Roberts' Assistant	Episode: "Panic in the Sky"
1953–1954	The Ford Television Theatre	Paul Andre	2 episodes
1953–1955	Your Favorite Story		4 episodes
1954	Mr. and Mrs. North	David Ennis	Episode: " The Quick and the Deadly"
1954	Meet Mr. McNutley	Episode: "The Tree"	
1954	Waterfront	Lloyd Allen	Episode: "Oil Island"
1954–1955	Public Defender	Gene Aiken / Prosecutor / Operator	3 episodes
1954–1955	The Mickey Rooney Show	Commentator / Horton / Harvey Flanders	3 episodes
1954–1956	The Lineup	Policeman / Goldsworthy – Hotel Manager	2 episodes
1955	Science Fiction Theatre	Captain Boyce	Episode: "Y..O..R..D."
1955	Treasury Men in Action	Dalton / Lieutenant Campbell	2 episodes
1955	The Man Behind the Badge	Hospital Doctor / Briefing Captain	2 episodes
1955	Highway Patrol	Hank – Officer 1730	Episode: "Desert Town"
1955	Death Valley Days	'Murph' Murphy / Greg Lewis	2 episodes
1955–1956	Cavalcade of America	Skinner / Mr. Cronin	2 episodes
1955–1956	TV Reader's Digest	Hal Britton	2 episodes
1955–1956	The 20th Century-Fox Hour	Farley / Herbert Shreve	2 episodes
1955–1957	Navy Log	Doctor / Chaplain	2 episodes
1955–1959	The Millionaire	Carl P. Grant / Mr. Clark	2 episodes
1955–1960	The Life and Legend of Wyatt Earp	Mayor Jim Hope / Perkins	2 episodes, Uncredited
1956	Telephone Time	Commander Hall	Episode: "Boarders Away"
1956	Combat Sergeant	Ritchie	Episode: "Flight to Eternity"
1956	Lux Video Theatre	David	Episode: "Only Yesterday"
1956	Crossroads	Joe Logan	Episode: "Ringside Padre"
1956	The Adventures of Dr. Fu Manchu	Dr. John Petrie	13 episodes
1956–1958	Studio 57	Porter	2 episodes
1956–1961	General Electric Theater	Orderly / Milkman / Lieutenant Harper / Detective	6 episodes
1957	Cheyenne	Morgan	Episode: "War Party"
1957	West Point	Captain Dudley	2 episodes
1957	Alfred Hitchcock Presents	Jim, a Bar Patron	Season 2 Episode 31: "The Night the World Ended"
1957	Fury	Henderson	Episode: "Fire Prevention Week"
1957	Broken Arrow	Secretary Thrale	Episode: "Smoke Signal"
1957–1958	Suspicion	Police Lieutenant Benson / Vern Lister	2 episodes
1957–1958	M Squad	Police Lab Officer Halligan / Plainclothesman in Courthouse	2 episodes
1957–1958	Harbor Command	Police Dispatcher	17 episodes
1957–1959	The Loretta Young Show	Mark Wilcox / Sam Price / Linden / Harry Correll / Conners	5 episodes
1957–1965	Perry Mason	Police Sergeant Grant / Lieutenant Colonel Fremont / Tower Man / Team Doctor / Policeman	6 episodes
1958	Tales of Wells Fargo	Mace Kimball	Episode: "Special Delivery"
1958	Panic!	Deputy Sheriff	Episode: "Stranded"
1958	Flight		2 episodes
1958	Tales of the Texas Rangers	Burt Wilson	Episode: "The Steel Trap"
1958	The Texan	Tom	Episode: "The Widow of Paradise"
1958	The Restless Gun	Arthur Stuart	Episode: "Multiply One Boy"
1958	Special Agent 7	Agent Ralph Blaine	2 episodes
1959	Alcoa Presents: One Step Beyond	Jim Hennessey	Episode: "Emergency Only"
1959	Bat Masterson	Murdoch	Episode: "River Boat"
1959	The Thin Man	Dave Jessup	Episode: "Cold Cargo"
1959	Markham	Frank Evans	Episode: "Incident in Bel Air"
1959	Men into Space	Major Gordon Briggs	Episode: "Edge of Eternity"
1959–1960	77 Sunset Strip	Sergeant Davis / Lieutenant Hirsch	2 episodes
1959–1960	Sea Hunt	Clark / Claude / USCG Captain Sellers	3 episodes
1959–1960	Bourbon Street Beat	Detective Lieutenant / Jeff Tolliver	2 episodes
1959–1961	Bronco	Poker Player / Sheriff Penrose	2 episodes
1960	The Untouchables	Policeman Mason	Episode: "Syndicate Sanctuary", Uncredited
1960	Johnny Midnight	Federal Agent No. 1	Episode: "A Token of Love"
1960	Wagon Train	Aaron Oliver	Episode: "The Jose Morales Story"
1960	The Roaring 20's	Dr. 'Mac' Merritt	Episode: "Vendetta on Bleecker Street"
1960	Lock Up	Dr. William Stanhope	Episode: "Society Doctor"
1960	The Jim Backus Show	Policeman	Episode: "Crime a la Carte"
1960–1961	Coronado 9	Sergeant / Bundy	2 episodes
1960–1963	Leave It to Beaver	Uncle Dave / Mr. Barnes	2 episodes
1961	The Case of the Dangerous Robin		Episode: "Brink of Disaster"
1962	Follow the Sun	Doctor	Episode: "Ghost Story", Uncredited
1962	87th Precinct	The Operator	Episode: "The Pigeon"
1962	Dr. Kildare	Outspoken Reporter	Episode: "The Search", Uncredited
1962	The Detectives	Dick Young	Episode: "Walk a Crooked Line"
1962	The Eleventh Hour	John Elwood	Episode: "The Blues My Babe Gave to Me"
1963	Arrest and Trial	Mr. Crane	Episode: "The Witnesses"
1964	The Man from U.N.C.L.E.	Ambassador	Episode: "The Dove Affair"
1964–1965	The Rogues	P.R. Man / Peter Stewart	2 episodes
1966	A Man Called Shenandoah	Doctor	Episode: "End of a Legend", Uncredited
1966	Run for Your Life	2nd Homicide Man	Episode: "Night Train from Chicago"
1966	The Lucy Show	Army Lieutenant	Episode: "Lucy Gets Caught Up in the Draft"
1967	Lassie	Ed	Episode: "The Eighth Life of Henry IV"
1967	Judd, for the Defense	Dr. Paul Kleefeld	Episode: "To Love and Stand Mute"
1967–1969	Dragnet	Lieutenant John Bigham / Captain Henry O. Mack / Lieutenant Roger Mairs / Lieutenant Bongard / Inspector Hagan / Captain Vern Hoy / Captain Al Trembly / Captain Nelson / Captain Frankel / Captain Brooks / Lieutenant Bob Helder / Captain Ron Frankle / Captain Mack / Captain Lambert / Captain Shannon	21 episodes
1968	Green Acres	Man from CBS	Episode: "The Rutabaga Story"
1969–1974	Marcus Welby, M.D.	Mr. Ross / Harold Riggs	2 episodes
1971	The Bold Ones: The New Doctors	2nd Reporter	Episode: "A Matter of Priorities"
1971	Vanished	Commander Fyfield	TV Mini Series
1971	Adam-12	Harold Johnson	Episode: "Day Watch"
1971–1972	O'Hara, U.S. Treasury	Doug Miller / Dan 'Rusty' Gates	2 episodes
1973	The F.B.I.	Mr. Silvestri	Episode: "The Rap Taker"
1973	The New Perry Mason	Private Investigator Coverly	Episode: "The Case of the Murdered Murderer"
1974	Hawkins	Accountant	Episode: "Murder in the Slave Trade"
1974–1975	Police Story	Man in Bar / Man / Judge Kinsolving	3 episodes
1975	Mobile One	Captain Graves	Episode: "The Bank Job"
1977	Barnaby Jones	Minister	Episode: "Duet for Danger"
1977	Never Con a Killer	The Commissioner	TV movie
1977	The Rockford Files	Mr. Rankin	Episode: "The Mayor's Committee from Deer Lick Falls"
1978	Project U.F.O.	Administrator – Houston	Episode: "Sighting 4003: The Fremont Incident"
1983	Dynasty	Justice	Episode: "Tender Comrades"
1985	Hotel	Bailiff	Episode: "Obsessions"
1985	T.J. Hooker	Chief Condon	Episode: "The Assassin"
1985	1st & Ten	Senator Bowman	Episode: "Not Quite Mr. Right", (final appearance)
