= Fu Manchu =

Fictional villain based on Asian stereotypes

Dr. Fu Manchu
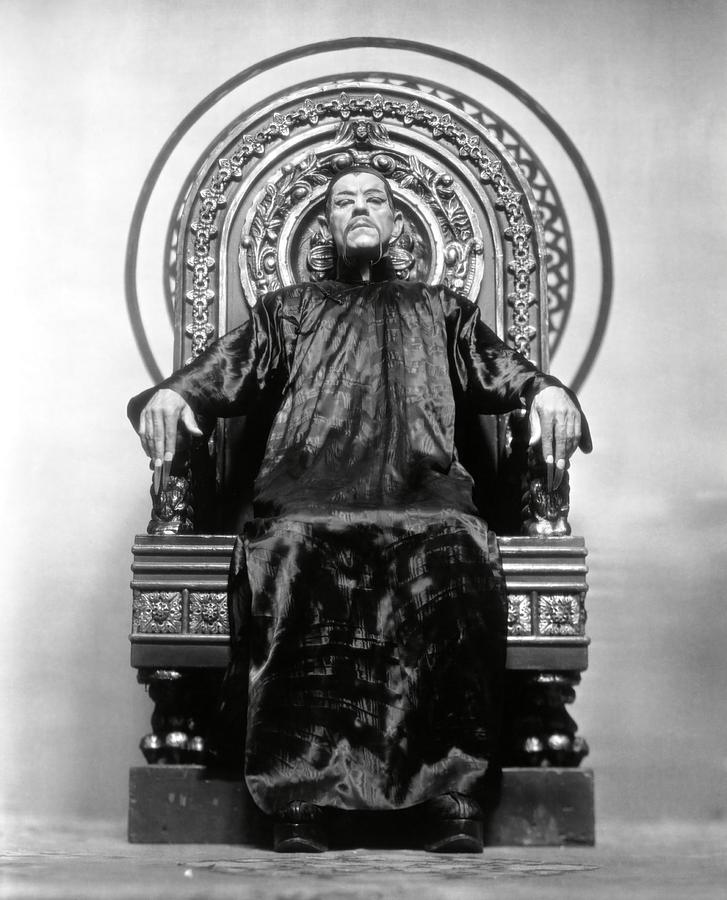
- Boris Karloff as Fu Manchu in the 1932 film The Mask of Fu Manchu
- First appearance: "The Zayat Kiss" (1912)
- Last appearance: Emperor Fu Manchu (1959)
- Created by: Sax Rohmer
- Portrayed by: Harry Agar Lyons; Warner Oland; Boris Karloff; Lou Marcelle; Henry Brandon; John Carradine; Glen Gordon; Christopher Lee; Peter Sellers; Nicolas Cage
- Voiced by: Arthur Hughes; John C. Daly; Harold Huber; Frank Cochrane

In-universe information
- Gender: Male
- Title: Doctor
- Occupation: Mad scientist, supervillain, assassin, crime boss
- Affiliation: Si-Fan
- Family: Fah Lo Suee (daughter)
- Nationality: Chinese Manchu

Dr. Fu Manchu (Chinese: 傅滿洲/福滿洲; pinyin: Fú Mǎnzhōu) is a supervillain who was introduced in a series of novels by the English author Sax Rohmer beginning shortly before World War I and continuing for another forty years. The character featured in cinema, television, radio, comic strips and comic books for over 100 years, and he has also become an archetype of the evil criminal genius and mad scientist, while lending his name to the Fu Manchu moustache. The character has been portrayed by actors including Boris Karloff, Christopher Lee, and Peter Sellers.

== Background and publication ==
According to his own account, Sax Rohmer decided to start the Dr. Fu Manchu series after his Ouija board spelled out C-H-I-N-A-M-A-N when he asked what would make his fortune. Clive Bloom argues that the portrait of Fu Manchu was based on the popular music hall magician Chung Ling Soo, "a white man in costume who had shaved off his Victorian moustache and donned a Mandarin costume and pigtail". As for Rohmer's theories concerning "Eastern devilry" and "the unemotional cruelty of the Chinese", he sought to give them intellectual credentials by referring to the travel writing of Bayard Taylor. Taylor was a would-be ethnographer who, though unversed in Chinese language and culture, used the pseudo-science of physiognomy to find in the Chinese race "deeps on deeps of depravity so shocking and horrible, that their character cannot even be hinted". Rohmer's protagonists treat him as an authority.

Fu Manchu first appeared in Rohmer's short story "The Zayat Kiss" (1912). It and nine further stories were later collected into the 1913 novel The Mystery of Dr. Fu-Manchu. Two more series were collected into The Devil Doctor (1916) and The Si-Fan Mysteries (1917), before the character entered a 14-year absence. Following 1931's The Daughter of Fu-Manchu, Rohmer wrote nine more Fu Manchu novels before his death in 1959. Four previously published stories were posthumously collected into The Wrath of Fu-Manchu (1973). In total, Rohmer wrote 14 novels concerning the character. The image of "Orientals" invading Western nations became the foundation of Rohmer's commercial success, being able to sell 20 million copies in his lifetime.

== Characters ==
=== Dr. Fu Manchu ===
Imagine a person, tall, lean and feline, high-shouldered, with a brow like Shakespeare and a face like Satan, ...Invest him with all the cruel cunning of an entire Eastern race, accumulated in one giant intellect, with all the resources of science past and present ...Imagine that awful being, and you have a mental picture of Dr. Fu-Manchu, the Yellow Peril incarnate in one man.

— The Insidious Dr. Fu-Manchu

Supervillain Dr. Fu Manchu's murderous plots are marked by the extensive use of arcane methods; he disdains guns or explosives, preferring dacoits, thugs and members of other secret societies as his agents (usually armed with knives) or using "pythons and cobras ... fungi and my tiny allies, the bacilli ... my black spiders" and other peculiar animals or natural chemical weapons. He has a great respect for the truth (in fact, his word is his bond), and uses torture and other gruesome tactics to dispose of his enemies.

Dr. Fu Manchu is described as a mysterious villain because he seldom appears on the scene. He always sends his minions to commit crimes for him. In the novel The Insidious Dr. Fu-Manchu, he sends a beautiful young girl to the crime scene to see that the victim is dead. He also sends a dacoit to attack Sir Denis Nayland Smith and Dr. Petrie.

In the novel Fu Manchu's Bride (1933), Dr. Fu Manchu claims to hold doctorates from four Western universities, while in Emperor Fu Manchu (1959), he states that he attended Heidelberg University, the Sorbonne and the University of Edinburgh. (In the film The Mask of Fu Manchu, however, he states proudly that "I am a doctor of philosophy from Edinburgh, a doctor of law from Christ's College, a doctor of medicine from Harvard. My friends, out of courtesy, call me 'Doctor'".)

According to Cay Van Ash, Rohmer's biographer and former assistant who became the first author to continue the series after Rohmer's death, "Fu Manchu" was a title of honor, which referred to "the warlike Manchu". Van Ash speculates that Dr. Fu Manchu was a member of the imperial family of China who backed the losing side in the Boxer Rebellion. In the early books (1913–1917), Dr. Fu Manchu is an agent of a Chinese tong, known as the Si-Fan, and acts as the mastermind behind a wave of assassinations targeting Westerners living in China. In the later books (1931–1959), he has gained control of the Si-Fan, which has been changed from a mere Chinese tong into an international criminal organization under his leadership. In addition to attempting to take over the world and restore China to its former glory (Dr. Fu Manchu's main goals right from the beginning), the Si-Fan now also tries to eliminate fascist dictators and halt the spread of communism around the globe, for its leader's own selfish reasons. Dr. Fu Manchu knows that both fascism and communism present major obstacles to his plans for world domination. The Si-Fan is largely funded through criminal activities, particularly the drug trade and human trafficking. Dr. Fu Manchu has extended his already considerable lifespan by use of the elixir of life, a formula that he has spent decades trying to perfect.

=== Sir Denis Nayland Smith and Dr. Petrie ===
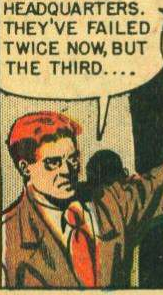
Denis Nayland Smith in The Mask of Dr. Fu Manchu (1951), art by Wally Wood

Opposing Dr. Fu Manchu in the stories are Sir Denis Nayland Smith and, in the first three books, Dr. Petrie. Petrie narrates the first three novels. (The later novels are narrated by various other characters allied with Smith right up to the end of the series.) Smith carries on the fight, combating Dr. Fu Manchu more by sheer luck and dogged determination than intellectual brilliance except in extremis. Smith and Dr. Fu Manchu share a grudging respect for one another, as each believes that a man must keep his word, even to an enemy.

In the first three books, Smith serves in the Indian Imperial Police as a police commissioner in Burma who has been granted a roving commission, allowing him to exercise authority over any group who can help him in his mission. When Rohmer revived the series in 1931, Smith, who has been knighted for his efforts to defeat Fu Manchu, is an ex-Assistant Commissioner of Scotland Yard. He later accepts a position with MI6. Several books have him placed on special assignment with the FBI.

=== Kâramanèh ===
Many there are, I doubt not, who will regard the Eastern girl with horror. I ask their forgiveness in that I regarded her quite differently. No man having seen her could have condemned her unheard. Many, having looked into her lovely eyes, had they found there what I found, must have forgiven her almost any crime.

— The Insidious Dr. Fu-Manchu

Prominent among Dr. Fu Manchu's agents is the "seductively lovely" Kâramanèh. Her real name is unknown. She was sold to the Si-Fan by Egyptian slave traders while she was still a child. Kâramanèh falls in love with Dr. Petrie, the narrator of the first three books in the series, and rescues Petrie and Nayland Smith many times. Eventually the couple are united and she wins her freedom. They marry and have a daughter, Fleurette, who figures in two later novels, Fu Manchu's Bride (1933) and its sequel, The Trail of Fu Manchu (1934). Lin Carter later created a son for Dr. Petrie and Kâramanèh.

=== Fah Lo Suee ===
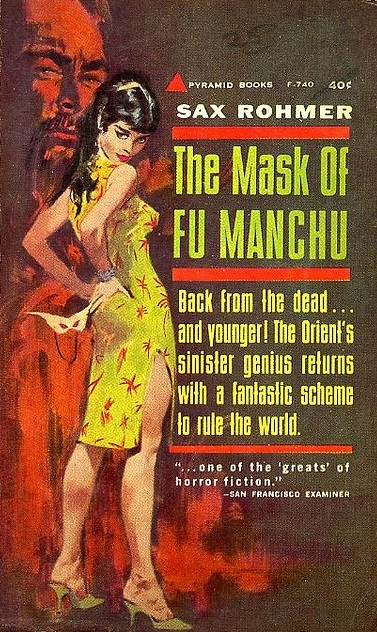
Fah Lo Suee on the cover of The Mask of Fu Manchu by Sax Rohmer. Illustration by Ronnie Lesser, 1962

Dr. Fu Manchu's daughter, Fah Lo Suee, is a devious mastermind in her own right, frequently plotting to usurp her father's position in the Si-Fan and aiding his enemies both within and outside the organization. Her real name is unknown; Fah Lo Suee was a childhood term of endearment. She is introduced anonymously while still a teenager in the third book in the series and plays a larger role in several of the titles of the 1930s and 1940s. She is known for a time as Koreani after being brainwashed by her father, but her memory is later restored. Like her father, she takes on false identities, among them Madame Ingomar, Queen Mamaloi and Mrs van Roorden. In films she has been portrayed by numerous actresses over the years. Her character is usually renamed in film adaptations because of difficulties with the pronunciation of her name. Anna May Wong played Ling Moy in Daughter of the Dragon (1931). Myrna Loy portrayed the character (as Fah Lo See) in The Mask of Fu Manchu (1932). Gloria Franklin had the role of Fah Lo Suee in Drums of Fu Manchu (1940). Laurette Luez played Karamaneh in The Adventures of Dr. Fu Manchu (1956), but the character owed more to Fah Lo Suee than to Rohmer's depiction of Kâramanèh. Tsai Chin portrayed Dr. Fu Manchu's daughter Lin Tang in the five Christopher Lee films of the 1960s.

== Books ==
=== Sax Rohmer ===
- The Mystery of Dr. Fu-Manchu (1913) (U.S. title: The Insidious Dr. Fu-Manchu)
- The Devil Doctor (1916) (U.S. title: The Return of Dr. Fu-Manchu)
- The Si-Fan Mysteries (1917) (U.S. title: The Hand of Fu-Manchu)
- Daughter of Fu Manchu (1931) (original title Fu Manchu's Daughter)
- The Mask of Fu Manchu (1932)
- The Bride of Fu Manchu (1933) (U.S. title: Fu Manchu's Bride)
- The Trail of Fu Manchu (1934)
- President Fu Manchu (1936)
- The Drums of Fu Manchu (1939)
- The Island of Fu Manchu (1941)
- Shadow of Fu Manchu (1948)
- Re-Enter Dr. Fu Manchu (1957) (U.S. title: Re-Enter Fu Manchu)
- Emperor Fu Manchu (1959), Rohmer's last novel published before his death
- The Wrath of Fu Manchu (1973), a posthumously-published collection. This contained the title novella (1952), and the short stories "The Eyes of Fu Manchu" (1957), "The Word of Fu Manchu" (1958), and "The Mind of Fu Manchu" (1959).

=== Continuations by other authors ===
==== Cay Van Ash ====
- Ten Years Beyond Baker Street (1984), the first of two authorised continuation novels by Cay Van Ash, Sax Rohmer's former assistant and biographer; set in early 1914, it sees Dr. Fu Manchu come into conflict with Sherlock Holmes.
- The Fires of Fu Manchu (1987), the second authorized continuation novel by Cay Van Ash; it is set in 1917, and documents Smith and Petrie's encounter with Dr. Fu Manchu during the First World War, culminating in Smith's knighthood.
- A third continuation novel, The Seal of Fu Manchu, was underway when Van Ash died in 1994 and it is believed to be lost.

==== Other authors ====
- The Terror of Fu Manchu (2009), the first of three authorised continuation novels by William Patrick Maynard; it expands on the continuity established in Van Ash's books and sees Dr. Petrie teaming with both Nayland Smith and a Rohmer character from outside the series, Gaston Max, in an adventure set on the eve of the First World War
- The Destiny of Fu Manchu (2012), the second authorised continuation novel by William Patrick Maynard, set between Rohmer's The Drums of Fu Manchu and The Island of Fu Manchu on the eve of the Second World War; it follows the continuity established in Maynard's first novel
- The Triumph of Fu Manchu (announced), the third authorised continuation novel by William Patrick Maynard, set between Rohmer's The Trail of Fu Manchu and President Fu Manchu
- The League of Dragons by George Alec Effinger, an unpublished and unauthorised novel, narrated by Conan Doyle's character Reginald Musgrave, involving a young Sherlock Holmes matching wits with Dr. Fu Manchu in the 19th century, of which two chapters have been published in the anthologies Sherlock Holmes in Orbit (1995) and My Sherlock Holmes (2003)

==== Other appearances ====
- "Sex Slaves of the Dragon Tong" and "Part of the Game", a pair of related short stories by F. Paul Wilson in his collection Aftershocks and Others: 19 Oddities (2009), feature anonymous appearances by Fu Manchu and characters from the comic strip Little Orphan Annie
- Several stories in August Derleth's detective series Solar Pons, in which he appears as "the Doctor"; Derleth's successor, Basil Copper, also made use of the character.
- Kurt Vonnegut's Slapstick (1976), in which he is the Chinese ambassador
- The Destroyer #83, Skull Duggery (1976), in which It is revealed that Chiun, the Master of Sinanju has worked for the Devil Doctor, as have previous generations of Masters.
- Kim Newman's Anno Dracula (1992), in which he appears as the leader of the Si Fan and chief crime lord of London, referred to as "The Lord of Strange Deaths".
- Ben Aaronovitch's series Rivers of London, in which Fu Manchu is a charlatan and con man rather than a supervillain, a Canadian married to a Chinese wife and only pretending to be Chinese himself; the grand criminal schemes attributed to him are mere myths concocted either by himself or by the sensationalist press and publicity-seeking police officers, the latter partly motivated by anti-Chinese prejudice.

== Actors ==
Actors who have played Dr. Fu Manchu:

- Harry Agar Lyons in The Mystery of Dr. Fu-Manchu (1923) and The Further Mysteries of Dr. Fu-Manchu (1924)
- Warner Oland in The Mysterious Dr. Fu Manchu (1929), The Return of Dr. Fu Manchu (1930), Paramount on Parade (1930), and Daughter of the Dragon (1931)
- Boris Karloff in The Mask of Fu Manchu (1932)
- Lou Marcelle in The Shadow of Fu Manchu (1939–1940)
- Henry Brandon in Drums of Fu Manchu (1940)
- John Carradine in Fu Manchu: The Zayat Kiss (1952)
- Glen Gordon in The Adventures of Dr. Fu Manchu (1956)
- Christopher Lee in The Face of Fu Manchu (1965), The Brides of Fu Manchu (1966), The Vengeance of Fu Manchu (1967), The Blood of Fu Manchu (1968), and The Castle of Fu Manchu (1969)
- Peter Sellers in The Fiendish Plot of Dr. Fu Manchu (1980)
- Nicolas Cage in Grindhouse (2007)

Actors who have played Dr. Petrie:

- H. Humberston Wright in The Mystery of Dr. Fu-Manchu (1923) and The Further Mysteries of Dr. Fu-Manchu (1924)
- Neil Hamilton in The Mysterious Dr. Fu Manchu (1929) and The Return of Dr. Fu Manchu (1930)
- Holmes Herbert in Daughter of the Dragon (1931)
- Gale Gordon in The Shadow of Fu Manchu (1939–1940)
- Olaf Hytten in Drums of Fu Manchu (1940)
- John Newland in Fu Manchu: The Zayat Kiss (1952)
- Clark Howat in The Adventures of Dr. Fu Manchu (1956)
- Howard Marion-Crawford in The Face of Fu Manchu (1965), The Brides of Fu Manchu (1966), The Vengeance of Fu Manchu (1967), The Blood of Fu Manchu (1968) and The Castle of Fu Manchu (1969)

Actors who have played Sir Denis Nayland Smith

== Cultural impact ==
The style of facial hair associated with Fu Manchu in film adaptations has become known as the Fu Manchu moustache. The "Fu Manchu" moustache is defined in the Oxford English Dictionary as a "long, narrow moustache whose ends taper and droop down to the chin", although Rohmer's writings described the character as wearing no such adornment.

Before the creation of Fu Manchu, Chinese people were often portrayed in Western media as victims. Fu Manchu indicated a new phase in which Chinese people were portrayed as perpetrators of crime and threats to Western society as a whole. Rohmer's villain is presented as the kingpin of a plot by the "yellow races" threatening the existence of "the entire white race", and his narrator opines, "No white man, I honestly believe, appreciates the unemotional cruelty of the Chinese."

The character of Dr. Fu Manchu became, for many, a stereotype embodying the "Yellow Peril". For others, Fu Manchu became the most notorious personification of Western views of the Chinese, and became the model for other villains in contemporary "Yellow Peril" thrillers: these villains often had characteristics consistent with xenophobic and racist stereotypes which coincided with a significant increase in Chinese emigration to Western countries.

After the Second World War, the stereotype inspired by Fu Manchu increasingly became a subject of satire. Fred Fu Manchu, a "famous Chinese bamboo saxophonist", was a recurring character on The Goon Show, a 1950s British radio comedy programme. He was featured in the episode "The Terrible Revenge of Fred Fu Manchu" in 1955 (announced as "Fred Fu Manchu and his Bamboo Saxophone"), and made minor appearances in other episodes (including "China Story", "The Siege of Fort Night", and in "The Lost Emperor" as "Doctor Fred Fu Manchu, Oriental tattooist"). The character was created and performed by the comedian Spike Milligan, who used it to mock the racist attitudes which had led to the creation of the character. The character was also parodied in a later radio comedy, Round the Horne, as Dr. Chu En Ginsberg MA (failed), portrayed by Kenneth Williams.

Dr. Fu Manchu was parodied as the fiendish Dr. Wu in the action-comedy film Black Dynamite (2009), in which the executor of an evil plan against African Americans is an insidious, moustache-sporting kung fu master.

Science historian Fred Cooper and colleagues draws a parallel between narratives that COVID-19 was created by China, and the machinations of Fu Manchu, who is "expert in the deadly application of animal and biological agents" and who has been depicted on US television shows as threatening the West with lethal diseases.

== In other media ==
=== Film ===
Dr. Fu Manchu first appeared on the big screen in the British silent film series The Mystery of Dr. Fu Manchu (1923) starring Harry Agar Lyons, a series of 15 short feature films, each running around 20 minutes. Lyons returned to the role in The Further Mysteries of Dr. Fu Manchu (1924), which comprised eight additional short feature films.

Dr. Fu Manchu made his American film debut in Paramount Pictures' early talkie The Mysterious Dr. Fu Manchu (1929) starring Warner Oland, soon to be known for his portrayal of Charlie Chan. Oland repeated the role in The Return of Dr. Fu Manchu (1930) and Daughter of the Dragon (1931) as well as in the short film Murder Will Out (part of the omnibus film Paramount on Parade) in which Dr. Fu Manchu confronts both Philo Vance and Sherlock Holmes.

The most controversial incarnation of the character was MGM's The Mask of Fu Manchu (1932) starring Boris Karloff and Myrna Loy. At the time of its first release the film was considered racist and offensive by representatives of the Nationalist government. The film was suppressed for many years, but has been released on DVD uncut.

Dr. Fu Manchu returned to the serial format in Republic Pictures' Drums of Fu Manchu (1940), a 15-episode serial considered to be one of the best the studio ever made. It was later edited and released as a feature film in 1943.

Other than an obscure, unauthorized Spanish spoof El Otro Fu Manchu (1946), the Devil Doctor was absent from the big screen for 25 years, until producer Harry Alan Towers began a series starring Christopher Lee in 1965. Towers and Lee made five Fu Manchu films: The Face of Fu Manchu (1965), The Brides of Fu Manchu (1966), The Vengeance of Fu Manchu (1967), The Blood of Fu Manchu (1968), and The Castle of Fu Manchu (1969).

The character's last authorised film appearance was in the Peter Sellers spoof The Fiendish Plot of Dr. Fu Manchu (1980), with Sellers featured as both Dr. Fu Manchu and Nayland Smith. The film bore little resemblance to any earlier film or the original books. Fu Manchu claims he was known as "Fred" at public school, a reference to the character in "The Terrible Revenge of Fred Fu Manchu", a 1955 episode of The Goon Show which had co-starred Sellers.

Jesús Franco, who directed The Blood of Fu Manchu and The Castle of Fu Manchu, also directed The Girl from Rio, the second of three Harry Alan Towers films based on Rohmer's Fu Manchu-like female character Sumuru. He later directed an unauthorized 1986 Spanish film featuring Dr. Fu Manchu's daughter, Esclavas del Crimen.

In the film Grindhouse (2007), Nicolas Cage makes an uncredited comedic cameo appearance as Dr. Fu Manchu during the "trailer" for the fake film Werewolf Women of the SS, directed by Rob Zombie.

A composite character of Fu Manchu and the Mandarin, named Xu Wenwu, appears in Marvel Cinematic Universe: Phase Four film Shang-Chi and the Legend of the Ten Rings, portrayed by Tony Leung Chiu-wai. The character was previously referenced in the Iron Man trilogy and All Hail the King. Xialing, Wenwu's daughter and Shang-Chi's sister, was partially inspired by Fah Lo Suee.

=== Television ===
A half-hour pilot was produced in 1952 for NBC's consideration starring Cedric Hardwicke as Sir Denis Nayland Smith, John Carradine as Dr. Fu Manchu, and Reed Hadley as Dr. John Petrie. NBC turned it down without broadcasting it, but it has been screened at special events.

The television arm of Republic Pictures produced a 13-episode syndicated series, The Adventures of Dr. Fu Manchu (1956), starring Glen Gordon as Dr. Fu Manchu, Lester Matthews as Sir Denis Nayland Smith, and Clark Howat as Dr. John Petrie. The title sequence depicted Smith and Dr. Fu Manchu in a game of chess as the announcer stated that "the devil is said to play for men's souls. So does Dr. Fu Manchu, evil incarnate." At the conclusion of each episode, after Nayland Smith and Petrie had foiled Dr. Fu Manchu's latest fiendish scheme, Dr. Fu Manchu would be seen breaking a black chess piece in a fit of frustration (black king's bishop, always the same scene, repeated) just before the closing credits rolled. It was directed by Franklin Adreon, as well as William Witney. Dr. Fu Manchu was never allowed to succeed in this TV series. Unlike the Holmes/Watson type relationship of the films, the series featured Smith as a law enforcement officer and Petrie as a staff member for the Surgeon-General. Though Republic had planned to film 78 episodes for the series, a dispute with Sax Rohmer ended the series after only 13 episodes were produced.

=== Music ===
- American stoner rock band Fu Manchu was formed in Southern California in 1985.
- Desmond Dekker had a 1969 reggae song titled "Fu Man Chu".
- The Sparks song "Moustache" from the 1982 album Angst in My Pants includes a lyric "My Fu Manchu was real fine".
- The Rockin' Ramrods had a 1965 song based on the film The Face of Fu Manchu, "Don't Fool with Fu Manchu".
- Quebec rock singer Robert Charlebois included an epic three-part song titled "Fu Man Chu" on his 1972 album Charlebois.
- Russian hardbass artist XS Project has a 2016 song named "Fu Manchu".
- American country music singer Tim McGraw published a song called "Live Like You Were Dying". The song references Dr. Fu Manchu in the lyric "I went two point seven seconds on a bull named Fu Manchu".
- American country music singer Travis Tritt published a song called "It's a Great Day to Be Alive". Dr. Fu Manchu's famous moustache is referenced in the lyric "Might even grow me a Fu Manchu".
- Japanese electronic music band Yellow Magic Orchestra published a song called "La Femme Chinoise", in which they reference the supervillain: "Fu Manchu and Susie Que and the girls of the floating world".
- American rock musician Black Francis released a song entitled "Fu Manchu" on his 1993 solo album Frank Black, which references both the style of moustache as well as the character after which it was named.
- British band The Kinks song 'The Village Green Preservation Society', released in 1968, includes a reference to Fu Manchu in the lyric "Help save Fu Manchu, Moriarty and Dracula".

=== Radio ===
Dr. Fu Manchu's earliest radio appearances were on The Collier Hour 1927–1931 on the Blue Network. This was a radio program designed to promote Collier's magazine and presented weekly dramatizations of the current issue's stories and serials. Dr. Fu Manchu was voiced by Arthur Hughes. A self-titled show on CBS followed in 1932–33. John C. Daly, and later Harold Huber, played Dr. Fu Manchu. In 2010, Fu Manchu's connections with the University of Edinburgh where he supposedly obtained a doctorate were investigated in a mockumentary by Miles Jupp for BBC Radio 4. Additionally, there were "pirate" broadcasts from the continent into Britain, from Radio Luxembourg and Radio Lyons in 1936 through 1937. Frank Cochrane voiced Dr. Fu Manchu. The BBC produced a competing radio play, The Peculiar Case at the Poppy Club written by Rohmer and broadcast in December 1938. In 1939, The Shadow of Fu Manchu aired in the United States as a thrice-weekly serial dramatizing the first nine novels.

=== Comic strips ===
Dr. Fu Manchu was first brought to newspaper comic strips in a black and white daily comic strip drawn by Leo O'Mealia (1884–1960) that ran from 1931 to 1933. The strips were adaptations of the first two Dr. Fu Manchu novels and part of the third. Unlike most other illustrators, O'Mealia drew Dr. Fu Manchu as a clean-shaven man with an abnormally large cranium. The strips were copyrighted by "Sax Rohmer and The Bell Syndicate, Inc." Two of the Dr. Fu Manchu comic strip storylines were reprinted in the 1989 book Fu Manchu: Two Complete Adventures. In 1940, the Chicago Tribune published an adaptation of Drums of Fu Manchu, at first it was a photo comics, but later it was illustrated by a unicredit artist.

Between 1962 and 1973, the French newspaper Le Parisien Libéré published a comic strip by Juliette Benzoni (script) and Robert Bressy (art).

=== Comic books ===
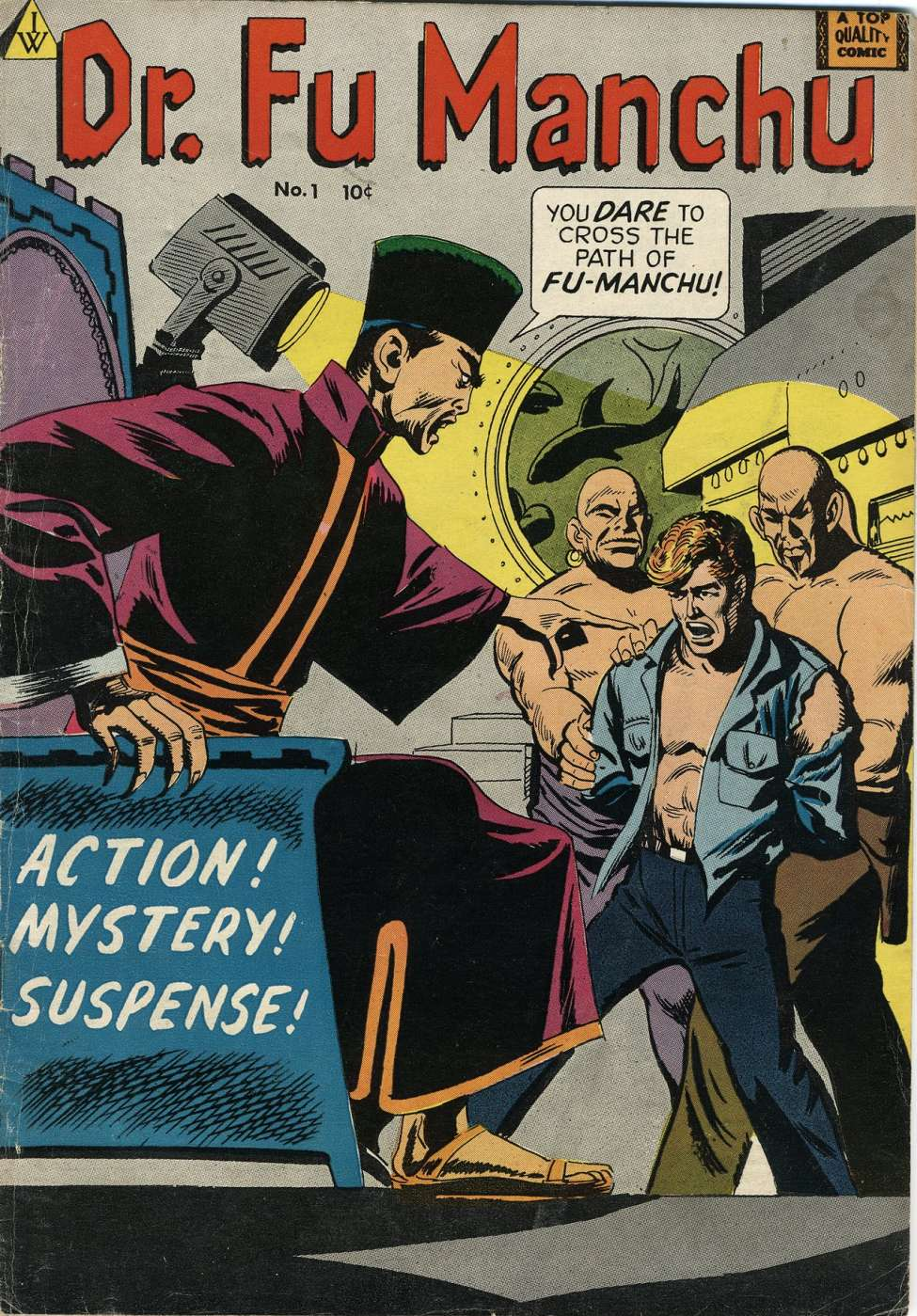
I. W. Publications' Dr. Fu Manchu (1958), reprinting material from Avon Comics, cover art by Carl Burgos

- Dr. Fu Manchu made his first comic book appearance in Detective Comics #17 and continued, as one feature among many in the anthology series, until #28. These were reprints of the earlier Leo O'Mealia strips. In 1943, the serial Drums of Fu Manchu was adapted by Spanish comic artist José Grau Hernández in 1943. Original Dr. Fu Manchu stories in comics had to wait for Avon's one-shot The Mask of Dr. Fu Manchu in 1951 by Wally Wood. Fleetway published an adaptation of The Island of Fu Manchu in 1956 through their "pocket library" title Super Detective Library #9.
- In the 1970s, Dr. Fu Manchu appeared as the father of the superhero Shang-Chi in the Marvel Comics series Master of Kung Fu. However, Marvel cancelled the book in 1983 and issues over licensing the character and concepts from the novels (such as his daughter Fah Lo Suee and adversaries Sir Denis Nayland Smith and Dr. Petrie) have hampered Marvel's ability to both collect the series in trade paperback format and reference Dr. Fu Manchu as Shang-Chi's father. As such, the character is either never mentioned by name, or by an alias (such as "Mr. Han"). In Secret Avengers #6–10, writer Ed Brubaker officially sidestepped the entire issue via a storyline where the Shadow Council resurrect a zombified version of Dr. Fu Manchu, only to discover that "Dr. Fu Manchu" was only an alias; that Shang-Chi's father was really Zheng Zu, an ancient Chinese sorcerer who discovered the secret to immortality. Later, Fah Lo Suee was renamed Zheng Bao Yu.
- Dr. Fu Manchu appears as an antagonist in Alan Moore's The League of Extraordinary Gentlemen. Simply called "the Doctor", he is the first to steal the Cavorite that the League is sent to retrieve. He is apparently killed in the climactic battle with Professor Moriarty.
- Fu Manchu makes a cameo appearance in an issue of the Team Fortress 2 web comics. In the comics, Fu Manchu is a spy and one of nine mercenaries hired at some point in the 1850s by twins Redmond and Blutarch Mann to fight in the "Gravel War", a conflict about the lands in New Mexico owned by the brothers.

=== Role-playing games ===
Fu Manchu appears in the adventures Night Moves and Night Live for the role-playing game Marvel Super Heroes.

== Accusations of racism ==
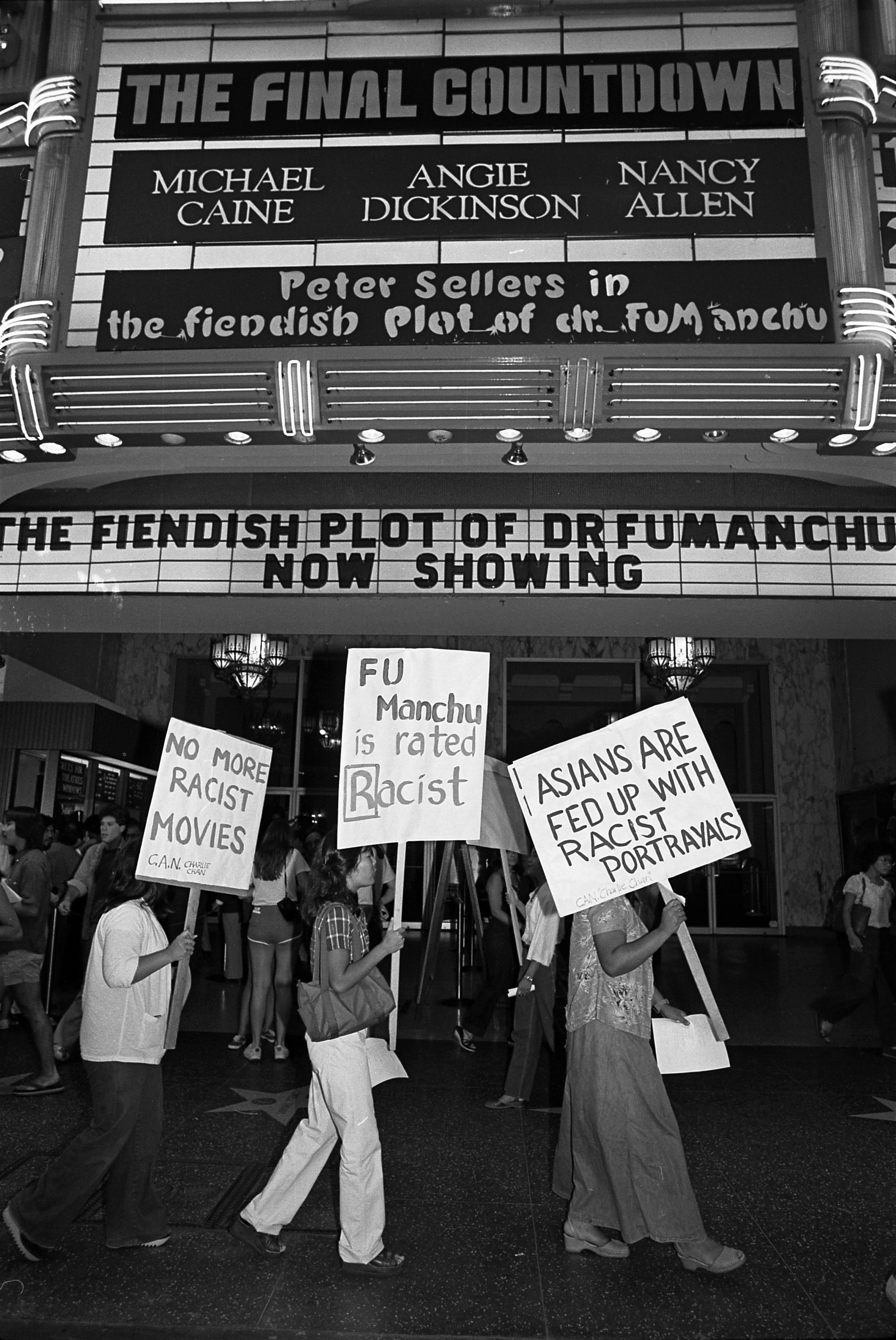
The Coalition of Asians to Nix Charlie Chan members picketing the film The Fiendish Plot of Dr. Fu Manchu (1980) at the Hollywood Pacific Theatre

The stories of Dr. Fu Manchu, both in print and on screen, have sparked accusations of racism and orientalism, from his fiendish design to his nonsensical Chinese name. After the release of Metro-Goldwyn-Mayer's film adaptation of The Mask of Fu Manchu (1932), which featured the Chinese villain telling his followers that they must "kill the white man and take his women", the Chinese Embassy in Washington, DC, issued a formal complaint against the film.

Following the release of Republic Pictures' serial adaptation of Drums of Fu Manchu (1940) the U.S. State Department requested that the studio make no further films about the character, as China was an ally against Japan during the Second World War. Likewise, Rohmer's publisher, Doubleday, refused to publish additions to the best-selling series for the duration of the Second World War once the United States entered the conflict. BBC Radio and Broadway investors subsequently rejected Rohmer's proposals for an original Fu Manchu radio serial and stage show during the 1940s.

The re-release of The Mask of Fu Manchu in 1972 was met with protests from the Japanese American Citizens League, which stated that "the movie was offensive and demeaning to Asian Americans". CBS Television decided to cancel a showing of The Vengeance of Fu Manchu. Los Angeles TV station KTLA shared similar sentiments, but ultimately decided to run The Brides of Fu Manchu with the disclaimer: "This feature is presented as fictional entertainment and is not intended to reflect adversely on any race, creed or national origin."

Rohmer responded to charges that his work demonized Asians in Master of Villainy, a biography co-written by his widow:

Of course, not the whole Chinese population of Limehouse was criminal. But it contained a large number of persons who had left their own country for the most urgent of reasons. These people knew no way of making a living other than the criminal activities that had made China too hot for them. They brought their crimes with them.

It was Rohmer's contention that he based Dr. Fu Manchu and other "Yellow Peril" mysteries on real Chinese criminals he met as a newspaper reporter covering Limehouse.

In May 2013, General Motors cancelled an advertisement after complaints that a phrase it contained, "the land of Fu Manchu", which was intended to refer to China, was offensive.

Characterizing Dr. Fu Manchu as an overtly racist creation has been criticized in the book Lord of Strange Deaths: The Fiendish World of Sax Rohmer. In a review of the book in The Independent, Dr. Fu Manchu is contextualised: "These magnificently absurd books, glowing with a crazed exoticism, are really far less polar, less black and white, less white and yellow, than they first seem."

== See also ==
- Anti-Chinese sentiment in the United States
- David Bamberg
- Dr. No
- The Deadly Hands of Kung Fu
- Ming the Merciless
- Mandarin
- Ra's al Ghul
- Sinophobia
- Stereotypes of East Asians in the United States
