= Cay Van Ash =

English writer

Cay Van Ash (born in Sussex, England in 1918; died in Paris, France in April 1994) was a Professor of English Literature at Waseda University in Japan and a writer.

In 1935, the 17-year-old pedalled his bicycle to interview his literary hero Sax Rohmer. The two struck up a friendship. Van Ash lived with the Rohmers for 15 months, while Rohmer taught him the mechanics of writing. He was employed as Rohmer's secretary for a number of years before moving to Japan in the 1950s. They continued to correspond until Rohmer's death in 1959.

In 1971, Rohmer's widow Elizabeth contacted Van Ash to help her complete a biography of her husband, Master of Villainy, which was published the following year.

Whilst teaching in Japan, Van Ash was licensed by the Rohmer estate to write a continuation Fu Manchu novel, Ten Years Beyond Baker Street (1984). Set in April 1914 in Sussex, it featured Dr. Petrie calling Sherlock Holmes out of retirement after Nayland Smith is abducted. A second novel, The Fires of Fu Manchu, set during the First World War, followed in 1987. A third novel, The Seal of Fu Manchu, was announced in 1988. At the time of his death in 1994, Van Ash and his wife were living in Paris where he was researching the novel's setting. The manuscript was unfinished at the time of his death and is now believed lost.

Van Ash taught at Waseda University from 1961 until his death.
