= Brood of the Witch-Queen =

1918 novel by Sax Rohmer

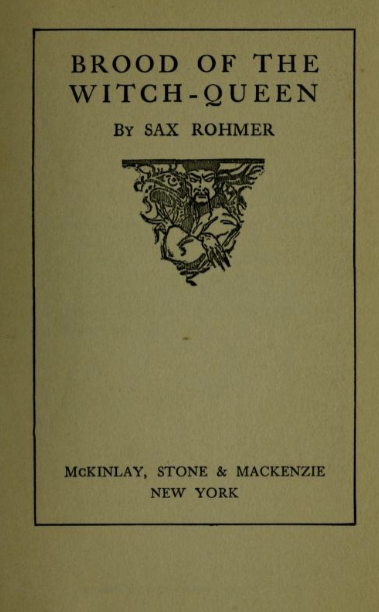
- Title page for Brood of the Witch-Queen (1924)
- Author: Sax Rohmer
- Language: English
- Genre: Horror
- Publication date: 1918

Brood of the Witch Queen is a 1918 supernatural horror novel by Arthur Henry Sarsfield Ward, known better by his pseudonym, Sax Rohmer.

The story deals with Robert Cairn and his suspicions of Antony Ferrara (the adopted son of an old friend and colleague of Robert's father, Dr Bruce Cairn) concerning infernal magic and supernatural influence.

== Plot ==
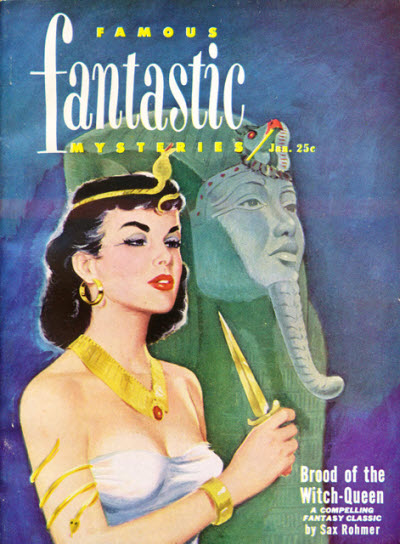
Brood of the Witch-Queen was reprinted in the January 1951 issue of Famous Fantastic Mysteries

The novel begins with the strange murder of Sir Michael Ferrara. A horrifying series of events follows, leading to a woman being used against her will to prey on her husband and then abducted and killed inside a secret chamber in an old Egyptian pyramid.

Only after a series of adventures and investigation is Antony Ferrara made powerless by Dr Bruce Cairn destroying the source of his control — the famed Book of Thoth — upon which Ferrara is no longer able to control the elemental he has summoned. Ferrara is found as a burned corpse the day after.

== Reception ==
H.P. Lovecraft compared the novel to Bram Stoker's Dracula, alongside Richard Marsh's The Beetle or Gerald Biss' The Door of the Unreal in his essay Supernatural Horror in Literature. Les Daniels identified the book as being probably Rohmer's best novel, noting that it lacked the pseudo-scientific explanations usually employed by the author and concluding that "Rohmer's occult lore was never as well employed as in this tale... and he never equalled the claustrophobic chills of the scenes in the bowels of a pyramid".
