= The Mystery of Dr. Fu-Manchu =

1913 novel by Sax Rohmer

The Mystery of Dr Fu-Manchu
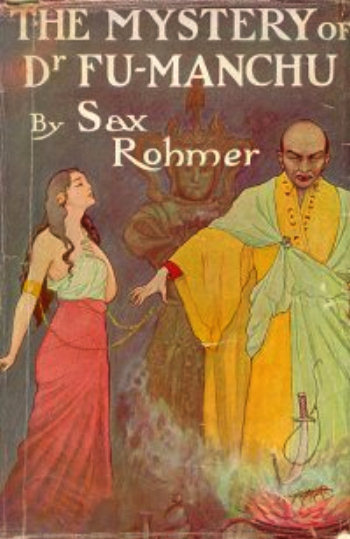
- Cover of the first edition
- Author: Sax Rohmer
- Language: English
- Series: Fu Manchu No. 1
- Genre: Crime fiction
- Publisher: Methuen
- Publication date: 1913
- Publication place: United Kingdom
- Media type: Print (hardcover)
- Pages: 308 pp.
- OCLC: 15344285

The Mystery of Dr Fu-Manchu (1913) is the first novel in the Dr Fu Manchu (sometimes "Fu-Manchu") series by Sax Rohmer. It collates various short stories that were published the preceding year. The novel was also published in the US under the title The Insidious Dr Fu-Manchu and was adapted into the film The Mysterious Dr. Fu Manchu.

== Plot summary ==
Dr Petrie is surprised by a late night visitor, "a tall, lean ... square cut ... sun baked" man who turns out to be his good friend (ex-Assistant Commissioner Sir Denis) Nayland Smith of Burma, formerly of Scotland Yard, who has come directly from Burma. We then learn that various men associated with India are the target of assassination by the Chinese master criminal Dr Fu Manchu, who seems to have been active in Burma (as distinct from India), in places such as Rangoon, Prome, Moulmein and the "Upper Irrawaddy" and who comes to England with dacoits and thugs.

Fu Manchu is pursued from the opium dens of the East End of London to various country estates. We learn that Dr Fu Manchu is a leading member not of "old China", the Mandarin class of the Manchu dynasty, or "young China", a new generation of "youthful and unbalanced reformers" with "western polish" – but a "Third Party". Nayland Smith is outwitted several times by Fu Manchu and thus he reflects more the narrow escapes of the later Bulldog Drummond rather than the "logical" superior approach of the earlier Sherlock Holmes.

Fu Manchu is a master poisoner and chemist, a cunning member of the Yellow Peril, "the greatest genius which the powers of evil have put on the earth for centuries", though his mission is not exactly clear at this stage. He appears to be trying to capture and take back to China the best engineers of Europe for some larger criminal purpose.

By the end of the book, Fu Manchu's slave girl Karamaneh, a beautiful Arab woman, apparently now in love with Dr Petrie, and her brother Aziz are freed from Fu Manchu's captivity, and Inspector Weymouth, driven mad by an injection of serum from Fu Manchu, is restored to sanity by Fu Manchu, who appears to have escaped from a fire which destroys the house that he had previously entered.
