= Sax Rohmer =

English novelist (1883–1959)

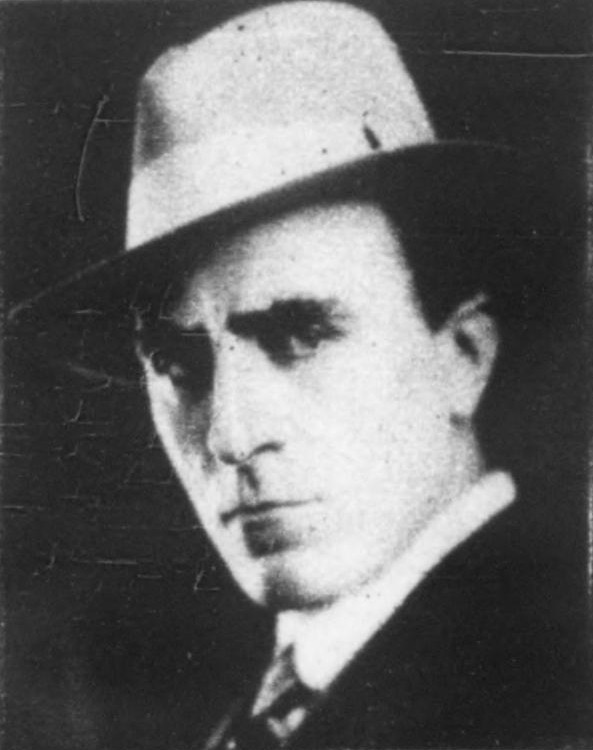
- Rohmer around 1929
- Born: Arthur Henry Ward; 15 February 1883; Birmingham, England
- Died: 1 June 1959 (aged 76); London, England
- Occupation: Novelist
- Writing career
- Pen name: Sax Rohmer, Michael Furey, Arthur Sarsfield Ward

Arthur Henry "Sarsfield" Ward (15 February 1883 – 1 June 1959), better known as Sax Rohmer, was an English novelist. He is best remembered for his series of novels featuring the master criminal Fu Manchu.

== Life and work ==
Born in Birmingham to working class Irish parents William Ward (c. 1850–1932), a clerk, and Margaret Mary (née Furey; c. 1850–1901), Arthur Ward initially pursued a career as a civil servant before concentrating on writing full-time. He worked as a poet, songwriter and comedy sketch writer for music hall performers before creating the Sax Rohmer persona and pursuing a career writing fiction.

Like his contemporaries Algernon Blackwood and Arthur Machen, Rohmer claimed membership to one of the factions of the Hermetic Order of the Golden Dawn. Rohmer also claimed ties to the Rosicrucians, but the validity of his claims has been questioned. His doctor and family friend Dr. Richard Watson Councell may have been his only legitimate connection to such organisations.

His first published work was issued in 1903, when the short story "The Mysterious Mummy" was sold to Pearson's Weekly. Rohmer's main literary influences seem to have been Edgar Allan Poe, Arthur Conan Doyle and M. P. Shiel. He gradually transitioned from writing for music hall performers to concentrating on short stories and serials for magazine publication. In 1909 he married Rose Elizabeth Knox.

He published his first book Pause! anonymously in 1910.

In 1934, Sax Rohmer moved into a newly refurbished house, Little Gatton in Gatton Road, Reigate, Surrey, where he lived until 1946.

After World War II, Rohmer and his wife moved to New York, only returning to London shortly before his death. He died in 1959 at the age of 76, due to an outbreak of Asian flu.

== The Fu Manchu series ==
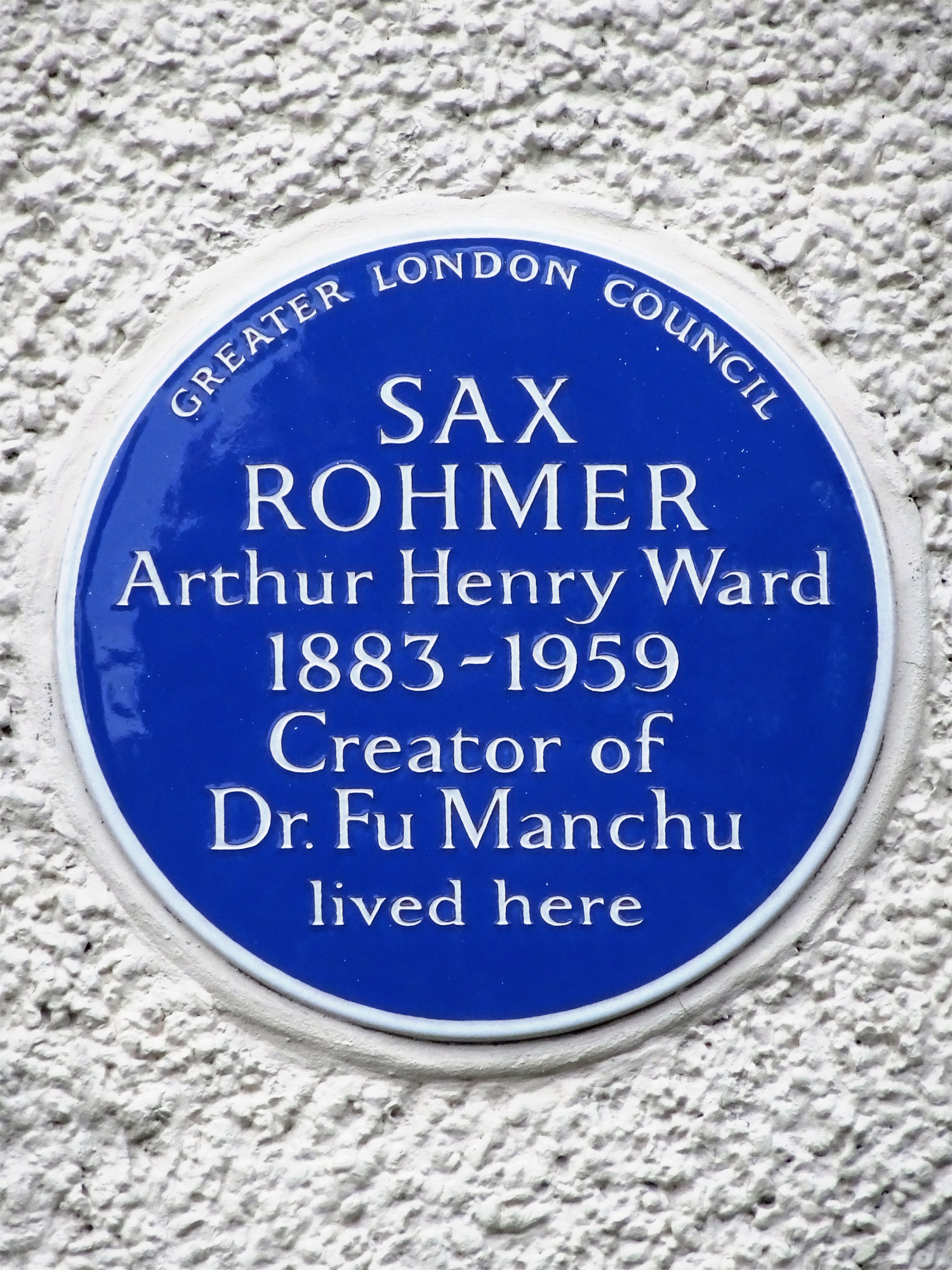
Blue plaque at 51 Herne Hill, Herne Hill, London

After penning Little Tich in 1911 (as ghostwriter for the music hall entertainer of the same name) he wrote the first Fu Manchu novel, The Mystery of Dr. Fu-Manchu, first published in a serialisation from October 1912 to June 1913. It was an immediate success, with its story of Denis Nayland Smith and Dr. Petrie facing the supposed worldwide conspiracy of the "Yellow Peril". The Fu Manchu stories, together with his more conventional detective series characters — Paul Harley, Gaston Max, Red Kerry, Morris Klaw (an occult detective), and the Crime Magnet — made Rohmer one of the most successful and financially well-off authors of the 1920s and 1930s.

Rohmer believed that conditions for launching a Chinese villain were ideal because the Boxer Rebellion had "started off rumors of a Yellow Peril which had not yet died down.

The first three Fu Manchu books were published in the four years between 1913 and 1917; but it was not until 1931 (some 14 years after the third book in the series) that Rohmer returned to the series with Daughter of Fu Manchu. The reason for the long interval was that Rohmer wanted to be rid of the series after The Si-Fan Mysteries. The first three books had been successfully filmed by Stoll in the twenties as a pair of serials.

Rohmer's first effort at reviving the Fu Manchu property was ultimately reworked as The Emperor of America. The original intent had been for the head of the organisation to be Fu Manchu's daughter. He kept Head Centre as a female criminal mastermind to combat Drake Roscoe, but was very unhappy with the book both as it started and in its finished form. He would later return to Drake Roscoe and his female supervillain for the Sumuru series. In the meantime, he tried again to focus his energies on what was first titled Fu Manchu's Daughter for Collier's in 1930, but with an older (now knighted) Denis Nayland Smith as the protagonist once more. The results were infinitely better and jump-started the series in the process.

In the 28 years from 1931 to 1959, Rohmer added a further 10 books to the Fu Manchu series, meaning the series totals 13 books in all (not counting the posthumous short story collection The Wrath of Fu Manchu and Other Stories). The Fu Manchu series was criticised by the Chinese government and Chinese communities in the U.S. for what was perceived as negative ethnic stereotyping. Sociologist Virginia Berridge has stated that Rohmer created a false image of London's Chinese community as crime-ridden, further claiming that the Limehouse Chinese were one of the most law-abiding of London's ethnic minorities. Critic Jack Adrian has written: "Rohmer's own racism was careless and casual, a mere symptom of his times". Colin Watson commented: "So vehement and repetitive were Sax Rohmer's references to Asiatic plotting against 'white' civilisation that they cannot be explained simply as the frills of melodramatic narration."

== Other work ==
Rohmer became a friend of escapologist Harry Houdini, who wrote to him in praise of Rohmer's The Romance of Sorcery. Rohmer based his mystery-solving magician character Bazarada on Houdini.

The Orchard of Tears is an odd book in the context of Sax Rohmer's other work. There are no Oriental villains or exotic locations; rather, there are gentle rabbits and lambs in pastoral settings and a great deal of philosophical musing. As much as he enjoyed Fu Manchu—and the notoriety and income the character provided—Rohmer had other interests and a markedly serious side. The departure from his expected subject matter is plainly signalled by the book's dedication: "To the slaves of the pomegranate, sons of Adam and daughters of Eve, who drink at the fountain of life, this chalice is offered as a loving-cup".

In The Quest of the Sacred Slipper (1919) terror comes to Britain when a self-centred archaeologist unearths one of Islam's holiest relics—the sacred slipper of the prophet Mohammed. Until it is returned to its rightful people, the implacable Hassan of Aleppo vows his reign of death and destruction shall not cease. Behind these inhuman outrages is a secret group of fanatics. Not even the best men of Scotland Yard seem able to apprehend them.

Tales of Chinatown (1922) is a collection of 10 short stories published in hardcover by Cassell in 1922 and Doubleday, Page and Company in 1922. All of the stories first appeared in magazine format. This collection includes a story that is considered to be one of his best and also has been anthologised many times; "Tcheriapin". The story "The Hand of the Mandarin Quong" was rewritten for this book; first published as "Hand of the White Sheikh", Rohmer changed the setting to a Chinatown background and published it as "The Mystery of the Shriveled Hand"; the title was then changed again for this collection.

Rohmer also wrote several novels of supernatural horror, including Brood of the Witch-Queen, described by Adrian as "Rohmer's masterpiece". Rohmer was very poor at managing his wealth, however, and made several disastrous business decisions that hampered him throughout his career.

His final success came with a 1946–1949 BBC Light Programme radio series that led to a series of 1950s novels featuring a female variation on Fu Manchu, Sumuru. The Sumuru series consists of five books. Two films featuring the character played by Shirley Eaton were also produced by Harry Alan Towers, as was a 2003 British–South African–German film, Sumuru.

Rohmer also wrote numerous short stories; "The Master of Hollow Grange" (1920) is a homage to M. R. James' story "Lost Hearts", featuring a mad scientist who preys on children.

Rohmer's work was banned in Nazi Germany, causing Rohmer to complain that he could not understand such censorship, stating "my stories are not inimical to Nazi ideals".

His wife, Rose Elizabeth (Knox) Ward (1886–1979), published her own mystery novel, Bianca in Black, in 1958 under the pen name Elizabeth Sax Rohmer. Some editions of the book mistakenly credit her as Rohmer's daughter. She and Cay Van Ash (1918–1994), her husband's former assistant, wrote a biography of the author, Master of Villainy: A Biography of Sax Rohmer, published in 1972.

== Works ==
For Rohmer's bibliography, see his full list of work.

Related works:

- Bianca in Black by Elizabeth Sax Rohmer, 1958
- Master of Villainy: A Biography of Sax Rohmer by Elizabeth Sax Rohmer and Cay Van Ash with Robert Briney, 1972
- Ten Years Beyond Baker Street: Sherlock Holmes Matches Wits with the Diabolical Dr. Fu Manchu by Cay Van Ash, 1984. Authorised by the literary estates of Sir Arthur Conan Doyle and Sax Rohmer.
- The Fires of Fu Manchu by Cay Van Ash, 1987. Authorised by the Sax Rohmer literary estate.
- The Terror of Fu Manchu by William Patrick Maynard, 2009. Authorised by the Rohmer estate.
- The Destiny of Fu Manchu by William Patrick Maynard, 2012. Authorised by the Rohmer estate.
- The Triumph of Fu Manchu by William Patrick Maynard (announced). Authorised by the Rohmer estate.

A note on texts: U.S. editions of the Sumuru books (Gold Medal/Fawcett paperbacks) have texts which were frequently corrupted.
