= Cookstrip =

Recipe in infographic format, invented by Len Deighton

Cookstrips are recipes drawn as black and white graphics with short instructions. They were invented by Len Deighton while studying at the Royal College of Art in the 1950s. Deighton, a keen cook, originally drew the cookstrips as instructions to himself in order to keep his expensive cookbooks from becoming dirty in his kitchen.

I'm very messy, and didn't want to take them into the kitchen. So I wrote out the recipes on paper, and it was easier for me to draw three eggs than write "three eggs". So I drew three eggs, then put in an arrow. For me it was a natural way to work.

Deighton's cookstrips were seen by fellow student Raymond Hawkey, who suggested that with the addition of a grid to increase legibility they could be a regular newspaper feature. Although the cookstrips were originally planned for the Daily Express they found a more permanent home as a weekly feature in The Observer. The first cookstrip, "Cooking Beef: Part 1", appeared in The Observer on March 18, 1962, eight months before the release of Deighton's debut novel, The IPCRESS File.

Len Deighton's Action Cookbook, which expanded these cookstrips into a full-length book was published in March 1965, timed to coincide with the release of the film of The Ipcress File starring Michael Caine. Deighton chose the menu for the movie's press lunch and everyone was presented with a copy of the book. In the movie, Caine's character, Harry Palmer, is seen cracking eggs with one hand while behind him Deighton's cookstrips are pinned to the kitchen wall. The hands cracking the eggs on film actually belonged to Deighton.

With the success of Len Deighton's Action Cookbook, a second book Où Est Le Garlic was published in October 1965. But by that time, Deighton was becoming fully committed to his fiction writing and the last cookstrip appeared in The Observer on 7 August 1966.

Starting in the 2010s, Deighton and his son Alex began creating a new series of cookstrips in the Observer Food Monthly.
