= The Ipcress File =

The Ipcress File may refer to:

- The IPCRESS File, spy novel by Len Deighton (1962)
- The Ipcress File (film), British spy film by Sidney J. Furie (1965)
- The Ipcress File (TV series), British spy thriller television series by James Watkins (2022)
