= Billion-Dollar Brain =

1966 novel by Len Deighton

- cover of the first edition
- Author: Len Deighton
- Language: English
- Genre: Science fiction, spy novel
- Publisher: Jonathan Cape
- Publication date: 1966
- Publication place: United Kingdom
- Media type: Print (Hardback)
- Pages: 412
- ISBN: 0-09-985710-3
- Preceded by: Funeral in Berlin
- Followed by: An Expensive Place to Die

Billion-Dollar Brain is a 1966 Cold War spy novel by Len Deighton. It was the fourth to feature an unnamed secret agent working for the British WOOC(P) intelligence agency. It follows The IPCRESS File (1962), Horse Under Water (1963), and Funeral in Berlin (1964). As in most of Deighton's novels, the plot of Billion Dollar Brain (1967) is intricate, with many dead ends.

== Plot ==
The unnamed protagonist is ordered to Helsinki by Dawlish, his boss, to suppress a newspaper article, potentially embarrassing to the U.K. government, about to be published by a Finnish journalist. He finds the journalist murdered and coincidentally meets a young woman who attempts to recruit him into the British Intelligence. This woman, Signe Laine, is both romantically connected to and working for the protagonist's old American friend Harvey Newbegin (who also appeared in Funeral in Berlin). Newbegin in turn attempts to recruit him into a private intelligence outfit, whose network is operated by 'The Brain', a billion dollar super-computer owned by eccentric Texan billionaire General Midwinter.

Midwinter is using his agency and private army to start an uprising in Latvia, at the time a part of the USSR, to end Communism in the Eastern bloc and tip the balance of the Cold War in favour of the West. After discovering this and also the fact that a package Newbegin wants delivered from England to Finland contains virus-contaminated eggs, stolen from a British research institute, the protagonist treks from Finland through Riga, Leningrad, New York City, Texas and back to London. He infiltrates Midwinter's organization, braving unforgiving environments, violence and shifting loyalties, eventually to return to the Baltic to stop the virus from falling into the hands of the Soviets and the madman billionaire and protect British reputations in the process.

== Film adaptation ==
The novel was filmed as Billion Dollar Brain in 1967, the third instalment of the Harry Palmer series of films based on Deighton's novels, featuring Michael Caine; it was a commercial flop.
