= Colonel Ross =

Fictional character

Guy Doleman as Ross in The Ipcress File (1965)

Colonel H. L. Ross is a fictional character from the series of novels by Len Deighton, variously described as the "Secret File" or "Unnamed hero" novels. His first names for his initials "H. L." are not revealed.

Ross is a senior officer in British military intelligence running a War Office security department from his office off Whitehall in central London. The character is introduced in The IPCRESS File, leading efforts to recover missing scientists and ultimately expose a traitor in British intelligence.

Ross is portrayed by Guy Doleman in the 1960s "Harry Palmer" films The Ipcress File, Funeral in Berlin and Billion Dollar Brain.

== Character ==
Ross is an old-school, establishment, British Army colonel. The novel's unnamed hero describes him as a "regular officer; that is to say he didn't drink gin after 7.30 P.M. or hit ladies without first removing his hat," with "the complexion of a Hovis loaf." He recruits Harry Palmer for military intelligence, with the threat of imprisonment if he refuses. Ross is a former military man with an air of social and educational superiority, which contrasts with Palmer's working-class background.

A straight talker who deploys understatement, subterfuge, and blackmail to achieve his goals, he is not above resorting to threats. "He was a quiet intellect happy to work within the strict departmental limitations imposed upon him" and according to some, "Ross was Military Intelligence". The unnamed hero suggests that "hitting platform five at Waterloo with rose-bud in the buttonhole and umbrella at the high port was Ross's beginning to a day of rubber stamp and carbon paper action."

He is happily married with one son, and lives in a large house and grounds in the London suburbs.

== Film portrayal ==
The Ipcress File (1965) shows Ross to be fond of his London Club and to enjoy feeding the birds. He keeps a packet of bird seed in a jar on his desk to feed pigeons from the window of his office overlooking Trafalgar Square. Later, he is seen feeding ducks in St James's Park. Ross claims to possess a "sense of humour". He tells Palmer that his B-107 personnel file "makes awful reading" and concludes that "you just love the army, don't you?"

In Funeral in Berlin (1966), Ross is shown to be a keen gardener, briefing Palmer while tackling a large thistle patch in his sprawling garden. "I like weeds," he tells Palmer rather pointedly. "You have to keep the flowers out, defend the strong against the weak. A garden should be like a country lane, a place you can walk in. Not with flower beds laid out like a cemetery."

In Billion Dollar Brain (1967), Ross tells Palmer, "I want you back in MI5". This is inconsistent with the two previous films, and the books, where it is mentioned that Ross' department is in the War Office and part of the Army, not a civilian department under the Home Office. The novels make it clear that 'Harry' has not and does not work for MI5, and that department is referred to euphemistically as "The Friends".
