= An Expensive Place to Die =

Espionage novel by Len Deighton

- First edition (UK)
- Author: Len Deighton
- Cover artist: Raymond Hawkey
- Language: English
- Publisher: Jonathan Cape (UK); Putnam (US)
- Publication date: 1967
- Publication place: United Kingdom
- Media type: Print
- Pages: 254
- Preceded by: Billion-Dollar Brain

An Expensive Place to Die is a 1967 novel by Len Deighton. It is set initially in Paris and takes its title from an Oscar Wilde quotation about the said city. ("Dying in Paris is a terribly expensive business for a foreigner.") The action concerns the shady dealing and possible expensive pimping of one Monsieur Datt against a background of espionage. This is the fifth novel in the "unnamed hero" series, but unlike the previous ones, it includes chapters and sections in the third person.

== Plot ==
The unnamed protagonist, a British intelligence officer, is told to leak to the Chinese information about the effectiveness of nuclear weapons, to bolster their deterrent effect. M Datt, posing as a psychologist, believes he is working for the Chinese by accumulating compromising film of the sexual activities of various influential people. The Chinese have no interest in the films and the narrator does a deal with the French security services to bring together the Chinese agent Kuang with the American nuclear scientist Hudson in a farmhouse in northern France, to communicate the information. He then escorts Kuang to a pirate radio station ship moored in international waters off Ostend and returns to the harbour, where Datt, trying to flee, is shot by a Belgian paratrooper. A sub-plot concerns Datt's illegitimate daughter Maria, who had been married to the French policeman Loiseau and had also fallen for the narrator. She protects the narrator when he is given a truth drug by Datt and then drives an ambulance containing the films to Ostend. Despite having caused her father Datt's death, at the narrator's suggestion she is let go.
