= Len Deighton =

British author (1929–2026)

- Deighton in 2009
- Born: Leonard Cyril Deighton; 18 February 1929; Marylebone, London, England
- Died: 15 March 2026 (aged 97); Guernsey, Channel Islands
- Education: Royal College of Art
- Occupations: Writer; illustrator
- Spouses: Shirley Thompson (m. 1960; div. 1976) Ysabele de Ranitz (m. 1980)
- Children: 2

Leonard Cyril Deighton (/ˈdeɪtən/ DAY-tən; 18 February 1929 – 15 March 2026) was a British author. His publications included cookery books and works on history, but he was best known for his spy novels.

After completing his national service in the Royal Air Force, Deighton attended the Saint Martin's School of Art and the Royal College of Art in London; he graduated from the latter in 1955. He had several jobs before becoming a book and magazine illustrator and designed the cover for the first UK edition of Jack Kerouac's 1957 work On the Road. He also worked for a period in an advertising agency. During an extended holiday in France he wrote his first novel, The IPCRESS File, which was published in 1962 and was a critical and commercial success. He wrote several spy novels featuring the same central character, an unnamed, cynical and tough working-class intelligence officer. Between 1962 and 1966 Deighton was the food correspondent for The Observer and drew cookstrips—black-and-white graphic recipes with a limited number of words. A selection of these was collected and published in 1965 as Len Deighton's Action Cook Book, the first of five cookery books he wrote. Other topics of non-fiction include military history.

Many of Deighton's books were best-sellers and he has been favourably compared both to his contemporary John le Carré and his literary antecedents W. Somerset Maugham, Eric Ambler, Ian Fleming and Graham Greene. Deighton's fictional work is marked by complex narrative structures, extensive research and an air of verisimilitude.

Several of Deighton's works were adapted for film and radio. Films include The Ipcress File (1965), Funeral in Berlin (1966), Billion Dollar Brain (1967) and Spy Story (1976). In 1988 Granada Television produced the miniseries Game, Set and Match based on his trilogy of the same name, and in 1995 BBC Radio 4 broadcast a real-time dramatisation of his 1970 novel Bomber.

== Biography ==
=== Early life and early career: 1929–1961 ===
Leonard Cyril Deighton was born in Marylebone, London, on 18 February 1929. His birth was in the infirmary of a workhouse as the local hospital was full. His father was the chauffeur and mechanic for Campbell Dodgson, the Keeper of Prints and Drawings at the British Museum; Deighton's mother was a part-time cook. At the time the family lived in Gloucester Place Mews near Baker Street. Deighton loved to say he "grew up in a house with 15 servants", adding that his parents were two of them. In 1940, during the Second World War, the eleven-year-old Deighton witnessed the arrest of Anna Wolkoff, a British subject of Russian descent for whom his mother cooked; Wolkoff was detained as a Nazi spy and charged with stealing correspondence between Winston Churchill and Franklin D. Roosevelt. (Note: In November 1940 Wolkoff was found guilty of breaching the Official Secrets Act 1911 and sentenced to ten years in prison.) Deighton said that observing her arrest was "a major factor in my decision to write a spy story at my first attempt at fiction".

Deighton was educated at St Marylebone Grammar and William Ellis schools, but was moved to an emergency school for part of the Second World War. (Note: Emergency schools were those set up during the Second World War to cope with the influx of children evacuated out of cities, and the conscription of teachers into the armed forces.) After leaving school Deighton worked as a railway clerk before being conscripted for national service at the age of 17, which he completed with the Royal Air Force (RAF). While in the RAF he was trained as a photographer, often recording crime scenes with the Special Investigation Branch (SIB) of the military police as part of his duties. During his work with the SIB he learned to fly and became an experienced scuba diver.

After two-and-a-half years with the RAF, Deighton received a demobilisation grant, enabling him to study at Saint Martin's School of Art where he won a scholarship to the Royal College of Art; he graduated from the college in 1955. While studying he held a temporary job in 1951 as a pastry chef at the Royal Festival Hall. He worked as a flight attendant for British Overseas Airways Corporation (BOAC) between 1956 and 1957 before becoming a professional illustrator. Much of his work as an illustrator was in advertising—he worked for agencies in New York and London—but he also illustrated magazines and more than 200 book covers, including for the first UK edition of Jack Kerouac's 1957 work On the Road.

=== Writing career: 1961–2026 ===
Cookstrip for boeuf bourguignon

While he was working at the Royal Festival Hall, Deighton would make sketches to remember some of the steps he took preparing dishes. He developed the idea into the concept of the "cookstrip", a full recipe within a cartoon-style illustration. (Note: Several of the strips are pinned up in the background of the film set of Harry Palmer's kitchen in The Ipcress File.) Following the publication of one of Deighton's cookstrips in the Daily Express in 1961, The Observer commissioned him to provide a weekly series for its own magazine, which he did between March 1962 and August 1966. He later explained:

I was buying expensive cookbooks. I'm very messy, and didn't want to take them into the kitchen. So I wrote out the recipes on paper, and it was easier for me to draw three eggs than write 'three eggs'. So I drew three eggs, then put in an arrow. For me it was a natural way to work.

In 1962 Deighton's first novel, The IPCRESS File, was published; it had been written in 1960 while he was staying in the Dordogne, south west France. The book was soon a commercial success and was a best-seller in the UK, France and the US, selling more than 2.5 million copies in three years. The story—written as a first-person narrative—introduced a working-class protagonist, cynical and tough. Deighton did not want to invent a name for the character and later explained "Some people felt that a contrivance, but I kept putting off inventing a name for him until I got to the end of the book and realised I could finish the book without giving him a name". (Note: The character appears in several of Deighton's works: The IPCRESS File (1962); Horse Under Water (1963); Funeral in Berlin (1964); Billion-Dollar Brain (1966); An Expensive Place to Die (1967); Spy Story (1972); Yesterday's Spy (1975); Twinkle, Twinkle, Little Spy (1976))

In 2017 Deighton described how he did not consider the character an anti-hero, but "a romantic, incorruptible figure in the mould of Philip Marlowe". Deighton described the inspiration of using a working-class spy among the Oxbridge-educated members of the Establishment as coming from his time at the advertising agency, when he was the only member of the company's board not to have been educated at Eton. He said "The IPCRESS File is about spies on the surface, but it's also really about a grammar school boy among public school boys and the difficulties he faces." (Note: The British grammar school is a state-funded institution which can select its own pupils based on academic ability. There are no fees for attending. A public school is a fee-paying institution, associated with the ruling class and upper echelons of banking, business and industry.)

Deighton published two further novels with his unnamed protagonist—Horse Under Water (1963) and Funeral in Berlin (1964). Funeral in Berlin stayed on The New York Times best-seller list for twenty weeks and sold more than forty thousand copies in hardback in 1965. He published two cookbooks in 1965, Len Deighton's Action Cook Book (a collection of his cookstrips from The Observer) and Où est le garlic (Where is the garlic), a collection of French recipes. (Note: Deighton has written five cookery books: Len Deighton's Action Cook Book (1965) OCLC 30271545; Où est le garlic (Where is the garlic; 1965) OCLC 1112522953; Basic French Cooking (1979) OCLC 473056466; ABC of French Food (1989) OCLC 1145799233; Basic French Cookery Course (1990) OCLC 803775071; In January 2015 Deighton created twelve new cookstrips which were printed monthly in the Observer Food Magazine.) They also sold well, making Deighton a best-selling author in two genres. Two further novels in the spy series followed—Billion-Dollar Brain (1966) and An Expensive Place to Die (1967)—after which he published his first historical non-fiction work, The Assassination of President Kennedy (1967), co-written with Michael Rand and Howard Loxton. During 1967 he also edited and contributed to Len Deighton's London Dossier, a work that described itself as "a real London guidebook". The book suggested the Rowton Houses owned by Rowton Hotels Ltd were doss-houses for the homeless. (Note: A "doss-house" ("flophouse" in American English) is a cheap lodging hostel where the homeless or those on very low incomes can stay overnight.) He and the publishers Jonathan Cape were sued for libel; they apologised, withdrew the suggestions made in the book by amending the claim in unsold editions and paid substantial damages.

In September 1967 he wrote an article in The Sunday Times Magazine about Operation Snowdrop, an SAS attack on Benghazi during the Second World War. Deighton wrote that the raid "suffered a lack of security" because David Stirling, the leader of the raid, "had insisted upon talking about the raid during two social gatherings at the British Embassy in Cairo although warned not to do so". Stirling sued Deighton and Times Newspapers for libel the following year as the implication was that his indiscretion had endangered the lives of his men. Stirling explained in court that one of the social gatherings was a dinner with Winston Churchill, Field Marshal Jan Smuts, General Sir Alan Brooke, General Sir Claude Auchinleck and General Harold Alexander; the second occasion was a private conversation with Churchill. Deighton and Times Newspapers apologised, published a correction and paid damages.

During the mid-1960s Deighton wrote for Playboy as a travel correspondent, and he provided a piece on the boom in spy fiction; An Expensive Place to Die was serialised in the magazine in 1967. In 1968 Deighton was the producer of the film Only When I Larf, which was based on his novel of the same name. He was the writer and co-producer of Oh! What a Lovely War in 1969, but did not enjoy the process of making films, and had his name removed from the film's credits. In 1970 Deighton wrote Bomber, a fictional account of an RAF Bomber Command raid that goes wrong. To produce the novel he used an IBM MT/ST, and it is possible that this was the first novel to be written using a word processor. Deighton was interviewed on Desert Island Discs in June 1976 by Roy Plomley. (Note: Deighton's choices on Desert Island Discs were Ludwig van Beethoven, "Für Elise"; Louis Armstrong & His All-Stars, "Stars Fell on Alabama"; Johnny Cash, "There Ain't No Easy Run"; Gwendoline Brogden, "I'll Make a Man of You"; Maurice Ravel, La valse; Wolfgang Amadeus Mozart, "Piano Concerto No. 11"; and Neil Diamond, "Cracklin' Rosie". His book choice was The Art of Modern French Cooking; his luxury choice was a darkroom.)

Deighton wrote Fighter: The True Story of the Battle of Britain, published in 1977, after being advised to do so by the historian A. J. P. Taylor. The book was well received by readers and reviewers, although the inclusion of interviews with German participants led to criticism from some. Taylor wrote the introduction for the book, describing it as a "brilliant analysis"; Albert Speer, once the Minister of Armaments for Adolf Hitler, thought it "an excellent, most thorough examination".

Fighter was followed in 1978 by another novel, SS-GB, the idea for which came from Ray Hawkey, Deighton's friend from art school and the designer of the covers of several of his books. While the two were discussing what would have happened if the Germans had won the Second World War, Hawkey asked Deighton if he thought there could be an alternative history novel. Blitzkrieg, Deighton's 1979 history of the rise of the Nazis and the fall of France, has a foreword written by General Walther Nehring, Chief of Staff to General Heinz Guderian. His last history book is Blood, Tears and Folly: An Objective Look at World War II (1993), which examined the events of the war up until 1942. Reviewing for The Times, Henry Stanhope considers the work "extremely readable", although he questions the structure of the book which focuses on different theatres of war, rather than using a purely chronological history. This approach, Stanhope considers, "presents a less complete picture to the reader". The historian Allan R. Millett considers that the book would have been improved by wider research into the Russian, Japanese and American aspects of the war.

Beginning in 1983 Deighton wrote three connected trilogies: Berlin Game (1983), Mexico Set (1984) and London Match (1985); Spy Hook (1988), Spy Line (1989) and Spy Sinker (1990); and Faith (1994), Hope (1995) and Charity (1996). Winter, a companion novel dealing with the lives of a German family from 1899 to 1945, which also provides an historical background to several of the characters from the trilogies, was published in 1987. The trilogies are centred on Bernard Samson, a tough, cynical and disrespectful MI6 intelligence officer.

=== Personal life ===
Deighton married the illustrator Shirley Thompson in 1960; the couple were divorced in 1976, having lived apart for more than five years. He left Britain in 1969, and lived abroad from then on, including in Ireland, Austria, France, the US and Portugal. He lived for a while in Blackrock, County Louth, where in February 1980 he married Ysabele née de Ranitz, the daughter of a Dutch diplomat. The couple had two sons.

Deighton did not like giving interviews, and these were rare throughout his life; he also avoided appearing at literary festivals. He said that he did not enjoy being a writer and that "The best thing about writing books is being at a party and telling some pretty girl you write books, the worst thing is sitting at a typewriter and actually writing the book." After completing Faith, Hope and Charity in 1996, he decided to take a year off writing; at the end of the period, he decided that writing was "a mug's game" that he did not miss and did not have to do. By 2016 Deighton had retired from writing.

Deighton died at his home in Guernsey on 15 March 2026, aged 97.

== Works ==
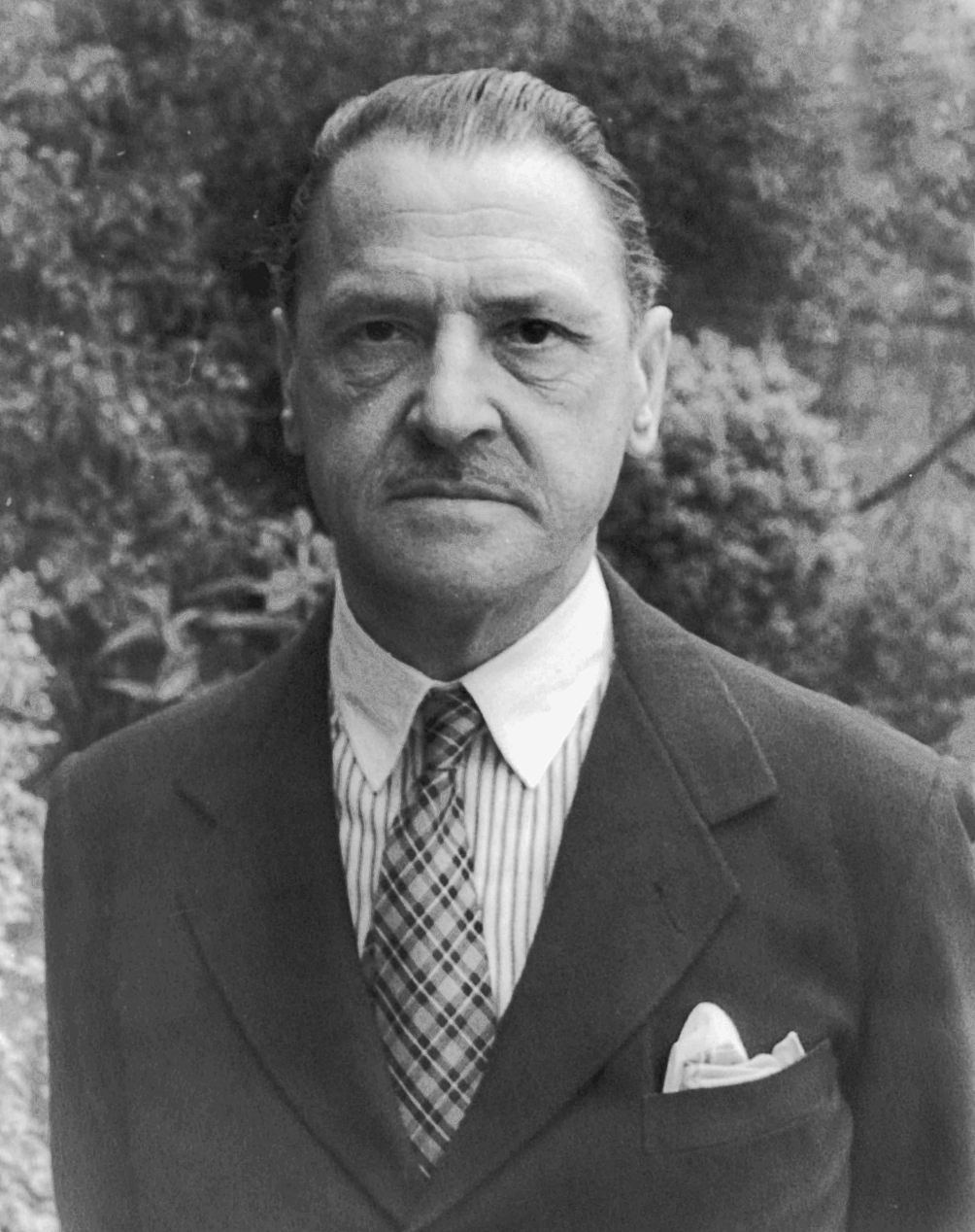
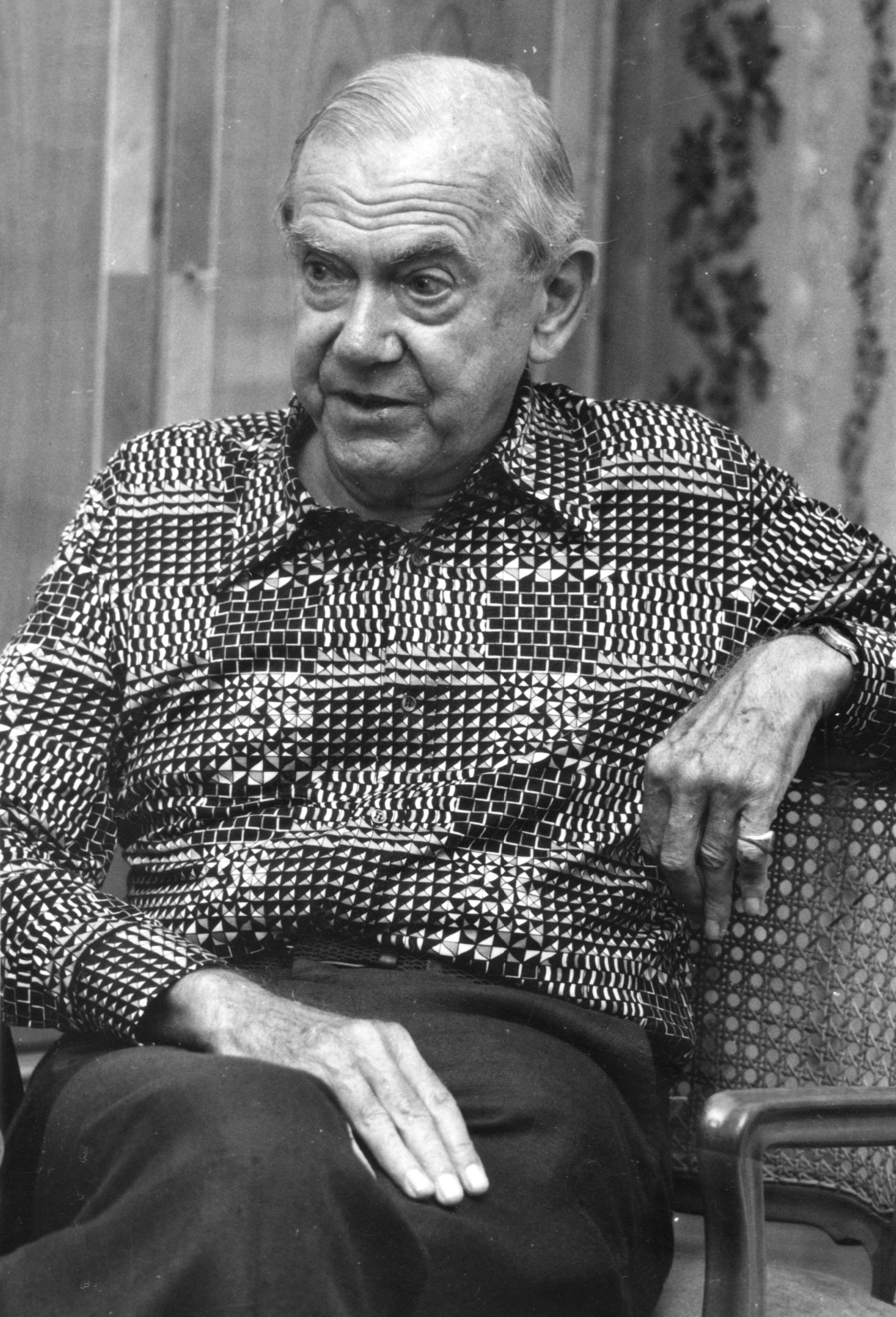
Deighton follows in the same literary tradition of British espionage writers as W. Somerset Maugham (left) and Graham Greene (right).

According to the Gale Contemporary Novelists monographs, Deighton and fellow author John le Carré follow in the same literary tradition of British espionage writers as W. Somerset Maugham, Eric Ambler and Graham Greene. Deighton provides an "energetic style" and his fictional work is marked by a complex narrative structure, according to Gale. Deighton extensively researched the background and technical aspects of his storylines, and enjoyed this side of producing work; in 1976 he said "I like the research better than I like writing books". The literary analyst Gina Macdonald observes that the technical aspect of Deighton's work can overshadow the plots and characterisation in the novel when Deighton provides too much detail in a short passage, leading to what she calls "banal conversations, stilted and unconvincing". Deighton was elected to the Detection Club in 1969 and their work Howdunit, published in 2020, was dedicated to him.

=== Novels ===
According to the film and media historian Alan Burton, The IPCRESS File—along with le Carré's 1963 novel The Spy Who Came in from the Cold—"changed the nature of British spy fiction" as it brought in "a more insolent, disillusioned and cynical style to the espionage story". The novel used appendices and footnotes which, according to Burton, gave verisimilitude to the work. (Note: The appendices for The IPCRESS File include the costs of Indian marijuana in 1962, the use of HM Prison Wormwood Scrubs as the headquarters of British Intelligence during the Second World War and cocktail recipes of drinks in the book. Some references include details of how the characters were involved in activities associated with the topics described.) The academic George Grella considers Deighton's novels to be "stylish, witty [and] well-crafted", and that they provide "a convincingly detailed picture of the world of espionage while carefully examining the ethics and morality of that world". Deighton has expressed his admiration for the police procedural, which he considers has an authentic feel, and approaches his fiction writing as a "spy procedural". Burton considers The IPCRESS File to be "a marker of a new trend in mature, realistic espionage fiction".

The IPCRESS File appeared in bookshops at the same time as the James Bond film Dr. No. Deighton acknowledged that his career had benefited from the enormous popularity of Bond, although he denied any similarity between his and Ian Fleming's books except being about spies. The academic Clive Bloom considers that after Funeral in Berlin was published in 1964, Deighton "established a place for himself ... in the front rank of the spy genre, along with Graham Greene, Ian Fleming and John le Carré". Deighton's later works were less oblique than the earlier ones, and had, according to Bloom, "more subtlety and deeper characterization". Oliver Buckton, the professor of literature, also considers Deighton to be in the forefront of post-war spy writers. The crime writer and poet Julian Symons writes that "[t]he constant crackle of his dialogue makes Deighton a kind of poet of the spy story".

Grella considers Deighton to be "the angry young man of the espionage novel", with the central characters of his main novels—the unnamed protagonist from the IPCRESS series and Bernard Samson from the nine novels in which he appears—both working-class, cynical and streetwise, in contrast to the upper-class and ineffective senior members of the intelligence service in their respective novels. His working-class heroes also stand in contrast to Fleming's Eton- and Fettes-educated smooth, upper-class character James Bond.

=== Adaptations ===
Several of Deighton's novels have been adapted as films, which include The Ipcress File (1965), Funeral in Berlin (1966), Billion Dollar Brain (1967) and Spy Story (1976). All feature the books' unnamed character, but he was given the full name "Harry Palmer" for the films; either the actor Michael Caine—who played Palmer in the films—or the producer for two of the three films, Harry Saltzman, came up with the name. Two television films also featured Palmer: Bullet to Beijing (1995) and Midnight in Saint Petersburg (1996); they were not based on Deighton's stories. All the films except Spy Story feature Caine as Palmer. Deighton's hands were used in The Ipcress File in place of Caine's for a scene in which Palmer breaks eggs into a bowl and whisks them. In March 2022 The Ipcress File, a television adaptation of Deighton's novel, was broadcast on UK television. Joe Cole was Palmer; Lucy Boynton and Tom Hollander also appeared in major roles.

Berlin Game, Mexico Set and London Match, the first trilogy of his Bernard Samson novel series, were made into Game, Set and Match, a thirteen-part television series by Granada Television in 1988. Although Quentin Tarantino expressed interest in adapting the trilogy, the project did not materialise. The nine Samson novels were in pre-production with Clerkenwell Films in 2013, with a script by Simon Beaufoy.

In 2017 the BBC adapted Deighton's novel SS-GB for a five-part miniseries, broadcast in one-hour episodes; Sam Riley played the lead role of Detective Superintendent Douglas Archer. In 1995 BBC Radio 4 broadcast a real-time dramatisation of Bomber. The drama was in four broadcasts, each of two hours, from 2:30 pm to midnight, threaded through the station's schedule of news and current affairs.

=== Legacy and influence ===
Deighton's work has been acknowledged by the thriller writer Jeremy Duns as being an influence on his own work. In Letters from Burma, the politician Aung San Suu Kyi mentions reading Deighton's books while under house arrest. Suu Kyi wrote that she was passionate about Arthur Conan Doyle's tales of Sherlock Holmes and the spy novels of le Carré and Deighton. When asked by Christie's about his love for Indian art and how he started his collection, the writer V. S. Naipaul credited Deighton. "I met Len Deighton, the thriller writer, at dinner many years ago. He demonstrated to me that Indian art could really be approachable. I bought from ... Maggs because of Len Deighton pushing me onto [them] as being a very fair dealer, saying that they do not charge you much more than they should. That's a marvellous thing to be told".

Deighton's 1970 novel Bomber was listed in Anthony Burgess's 1984 work Ninety-nine Novels as one of the 99 best novels in English since 1939. Bomber, the third album of the rock group Motörhead, was named after the novel, as the band's singer, Lemmy, was reading it at the time they were recording the album.

== Notes and references ==
=== Sources ===
==== Books ====
- Barrett, Oliver Boyd; Herrera, David; Baumann, James A. (2011). Hollywood and the CIA: Cinema, Defense and Subversion. London: Routledge. ISBN 978-1-136-80676-6.
- Bloom, Clive, ed. (1995). Modern Crime and Suspense Writers. New York: Chelsea House. ISBN 978-0-5852-2979-9.
- Buckton, Oliver (2012). "Len Deighton". In Parini, Jay (ed.). British Writers. Supplement XVIII. Detroit, MI: Gale. pp. 55–72. ISBN 978-1-4144-8026-8.
- Burton, Alan (2016). Historical Dictionary of British Spy Fiction. London: Rowman & Littlefield. ISBN 978-1-4422-5587-6.
- Burton, Alan (2018). Looking-Glass Wars: Spies on British Screens since 1960. Wilmington, DE: Vernon Press. ISBN 978-1-62273-290-6.
- Caine, Michael (2012). What's It All About?. London: Random House. ISBN 978-1-4481-3648-3.
- Deighton, Len (1964) [1962]. The IPCRESS File. London: Panther. OCLC 154157529.
- Deighton, Len (1982). Blitzkrieg: From the Rise of Hitler to the Fall of Dunkirk. New York: Ballantine Books. ISBN 978-0-7126-7428-7.
- Edwards, Martin, ed. (2020). Howdunit! A Masterclass in Crime Writing by Members of the Detection Club. London: Collins Crime Club. ISBN 978-0-0083-8013-7.
- Gosden, Peter H. J. H. (2013). Education in the Second World War: A Study in Policy and Administration. London: Routledge. ISBN 978-0-4154-3220-7.
- Grella, George (1988). "Len Deighton". In Reilly, John M. (ed.). Twentieth Century Crime & Mystery Writers. London: Macmillan. ISBN 978-1-349-81366-7.
- Hines, Claire (2018). The Playboy and James Bond: 007, Ian Fleming and Playboy magazine. Manchester: Manchester University Press. ISBN 978-1-5261-1616-1.
- Krueger, Christine L. (2014). Encyclopedia of British Writers: 19th and 20th Centuries. New York: Infobase Publishing. ISBN 978-1-4381-0870-4.
- Macdonald, Gina (1992). "Len Deighton". Concise Dictionary of British Literary Biography. Detroit, MI: Gale Research. pp. 35–55. ISBN 978-0-8103-7988-6.
- Masters, Anthony (1987). Literary Agents: The Novelist as Spy. London: Basil Blackwell. ISBN 978-0-6311-4979-8.
- Milward-Oliver, Edward (1987). The Len Deighton Companion. London: Grafton. ISBN 978-0-586-07000-0.
- Rose, Lionel (1988). Rogues and Vagabonds: Vagrant Underworld in Britain, 1815–1985. London: Routledge. ISBN 978-0-4150-0275-2.
- Sampson, Anthony (1982). The Changing Anatomy of Britain. New York: Random House. ISBN 978-0-3945-3143-4.
- Symons, Julian (1985). Bloody Murder: From the Detective Story to the Crime Novel. New York: Viking. ISBN 978-0-6708-0096-4.
- Taylor, A. J. P. (1994). Introduction. Fighter: The True Story of the Battle of Britain. By Deighton, Len. New York: Harper Paperbacks. ISBN 978-0-0610-0802-3.
- Woods, Brett F. (2008). Neutral Ground: A Political History of Espionage Fiction. New York: Algora Publishing. ISBN 978-0-87586-533-1.

==== Broadcast media ====
- Deighton, Len (19 June 1976). Desert Island Discs (Radio programme). BBC.
- "The Deighton File". The Author Archive Collection. 26 May 2009.

==== Journals and magazines ====
- Baker, Brian (2012). "'You're Quite a Gourmet, Aren't You, Palmer?' Masculinity and Food in the Spy Fiction of Len Deighton". The Yearbook of English Studies. 42: 30–48. doi:10.5699/yearenglstud.42.2012.0030. ISSN 0306-2473. JSTOR 10.5699/yearenglstud.42.2012.0030. S2CID 190558061.
- "BBC Radio 4, 18 February 1995". Radio Times. No. 3709. 18 February 1995. Archived from the original on 28 October 2023.
- "Books". The Bookseller (3838): 80. 1979. ISSN 0006-7539.
- Brown, Geoffrey (February 1987). "The Thrillers and Spy Novels of Len Deighton". The Book and Magazine Collector (35). Diamond Publishing Group. ISSN 0952-8601.
- Burton, Alan (January 2013). "Mind Bending, Mental Seduction and Menticide: Brainwashing in British Spy Dramas of the 1960s". Journal of British Cinema and Television. 10 (1): 27–48. doi:10.3366/jbctv.2013.0120.
- Deighton, Len (May 1966). "Why Does My Art Go Boom?". Playboy. pp. 103, 182–184.
- "In England Now". The Lancet. 272 (6983): 1351–1352. 29 June 1957. ISSN 0140-6736.
- Jackson, Crispin; Gwilliam, Graham (March 1999). "Len Deighton: The Master Thriller Writer Turns Seventy". The Book and Magazine Collector (180). Diamond Publishing Group.
- Mason, Howard (Spring 2025). "A woman agent in the male world of the Cold War spy novel : the case of Len Deighton's Fiona Samson". Clues : a journal of detection. 43 (1): 60–72.
- Millett, Allan R. (March 1995). "Blood, Tears and Folly: An Objective Look at World War II". The Journal of American History. 81 (4): 1807–1808. doi:10.2307/2081821. JSTOR 2081821.

==== News media ====
- "Back to prayer for Suu Kyi". Capital News. 12 August 2009.
- Barnard, Peter (18 February 1995). "Flying back in real time". The Times. p. 24 (section 2).
- Bateman, Michael (6 April 1997). "A kitchen thriller". The Independent.
- Bird, David (26 November 1976). "Notes on people". The New York Times. p. 39.
- Burgess, Anthony (5 February 1984). "Modern novels; The 99 best". The New York Times. Section 7; Page 1.
- Campbell, Christy (21 June 1992). "Spies With class". The Sunday Telegraph. p. 101.
- Child, Ben (14 August 2009). "Tarantino mulls Deighton spy film to rival Bond". The Guardian.
- Dawson Scott, Robert (4 January 2006a). "Len Deighton: The spy and I". The Independent. p. 43.
- Dawson Scott, Robert (7 January 2006b). "A class act, not a class warrior". The Times. (subscription required)
- Didcock, Barry (31 May 2009). "Tributes to the lives and times of two great talents". Sunday Herald. p. 17.
- Duns, Jeremy (19 February 2009). "Jeremy Duns pays tribute to novelist Len Deighton". The Guardian.
- Egan, Barry (17 September 2018). "Declan Lynch on his childhood and why 'alcoholic' is more of a stigma than words like 'depression'". Irish Independent.
- Grimes, William (17 March 2026). "Len Deighton, Author of Espionage Best-Sellers, Dies at 97". The New York Times.
- Grow, Kory (28 August 2015). "Motorhead's Lemmy: My life in 15 snarls". Rolling Stone.
- Hilton, Nick (7 March 2022). "The Perfect Spy; Joe Cole steps into Michael Caine's shoes in a vibrant and deliciously retro Sixties 'The Ipcress File', says Nick Hilton". The Independent. p. 38.
- Kemp, Stuart (4 November 2013). "Simon Beaufoy to adapt Len Deighton's spy novels for TV". The Hollywood Reporter.
- Kerridge, Jake (20 February 2016). "In a hurry to use his organ donor card". The Daily Telegraph. p. 29.
- Kerridge, Jake (14 February 2009). "The Deighton file: a life of reluctance and intrigue". The Daily Telegraph. p. 10.
- Kerridge, Jake (19 February 2017). "Len Deighton interview: 'Nobody could have had a happier life than I've had'". The Sunday Telegraph. p. 55.
- Kerridge, Jake (18 February 2019). "From Ian Fleming to Ann Cleeves: Desert Island Discs' best crime writer castaways". The Daily Telegraph. p. 44.
- Kirschenbaum, Matthew (1 March 2013). "The book-writing machine: what was the first novel ever written on a word processor?". Slate.
- Landin, Conrad (24 February 2022). "Time to reopen the Deighton file". Camden New Journal.
- "Len Deighton". The Guardian. 22 July 2008. Archived from the original on 10 August 2022.
- "Len Deighton Obituary: Writer Who Redefined Spy Thrillers Dies Aged 97". The Times. 17 March 2026.
- "Libel damages For 'doss-house'". The Times. 13 July 1967. p. 15.
- "Libel damages For 'Operation Snowdrop' Leader". The Times. 24 May 1968. p. 15.
- Masters, A (26 October 1985). "Deighton still the master of the spy thriller". The Courier-Mail. p. 21.
- "Secrets case ended". The Times. 8 November 1940. p. 2.
- Stanhope, Henry (18 November 1993). "Panzers and warhorses". The Times. p. 39.
- Stummer, Robin (14 December 2014). "Len Deighton's Observer cookstrips, Michael Caine and the 1960s". The Observer. Archived from the original on 14 June 2016.
- "Through the lens of half a century, we look back on the moments that shaped entertainment and pop culture". The Daily News of Los Angeles. 17 January 2020. p. 1.
- Twigg, Melissa (9 March 2022). "The Ipcress File costumes bringing the 1960s drama to life; How class, history and the 1965 film inspired costume designs for the new series, writes Melissa Twigg". The Daily Telegraph. p. 24.
- Walsh, John (17 June 2009). "A taste of the action: Len Deighton's cult Sixties' cookbook is back". The Independent. Archived from the original on 5 March 2016.
- Whitworth, Damian (11 February 2017). "There's a Nazi in No 10 and the SS in Scotland Yard". The Times.

==== Websites ====
- "BBC Radio 4 – Desert Island Discs, Len Deighton". BBC.
- "Collectors & their collections: V.S. Naipaul". Christie's. 1 June 2015. Archived from the original on 6 January 2015.
- Deighton, Len (9 July 2017). "Len Deighton reveals how he wrote SS-GB, the bestseller that imagines Hitler had won the war". Radio Times.
- "Game, Set and Match (1988)". British Film Institute. Archived from the original on 27 April 2016.
- "Len Deighton". Adrian Flowers.
- "Len Deighton". Contemporary Authors. Gale. Archived from the original on 15 April 2016. (subscription required)
- "Len Deighton". Contemporary Novelists. Gale. 2001. (subscription required)
- "Only When I Larf (1968)". British Film Institute. Archived from the original on 10 March 2016.
- Sharf, Zack (3 October 2019). "Quentin Tarantino's last movie: 17 unmade projects that could be his final film". IndieWire.
- "Types of school". UK Government. Archived from the original on 2 October 2023.
