= The Ipcress File (film) =

1965 British spy film directed by Sidney J. Furie

- British quad film poster
- Directed by: Sidney J. Furie
- Screenplay by: Bill Canaway; James Doran (Note: Lukas Heller, Lionel Davidson, Ken Hughes and Johanna Harwood made uncredited contributions to the screenplay.)
- Based on: The IPCRESS File; 1962 novel by Len Deighton
- Produced by: Harry Saltzman
- Starring: Michael Caine; Nigel Green; Guy Doleman; Sue Lloyd
- Cinematography: Otto Heller
- Edited by: Peter R. Hunt
- Music by: John Barry
- Production companies: Lowndes Productions; Steven S.A.
- Distributed by: Rank Film Distributors
- Release date: 18 March 1965 (UK)
- Running time: 109 minutes
- Country: United Kingdom
- Language: English
- Budget: $750,000 or £309,261

The Ipcress File is a 1965 British spy film directed by Sidney J. Furie, from a screenplay by Bill Canaway and James Doran, based on Len Deighton's 1962 novel The IPCRESS File. It stars Michael Caine as Harry Palmer, an intelligence officer from the War Office investigating the disappearances of high-level scientists.

This film and its sequels were a deliberately downbeat alternative to the hugely successful James Bond films, even though some of the production team were previously involved with the 007 films, including producer Harry Saltzman, production designer Ken Adam, and composer John Barry.

The Ipcress File was released by Rank Film Distributors on 18 March 1965. It received positive reviews and won three BAFTA Awards, including for Best British Film. In 1999, it was included at number 59 on the BFI list of the 100 best British films of the 20th century.

There are two sequel films, Funeral in Berlin, released in 1966, and Billion Dollar Brain, released in 1967.

== Plot ==
A scientist called Radcliffe is kidnapped from a train and his security escort killed. Harry Palmer, a British Army sergeant with a record of insubordination and a criminal past, now working for a Ministry of Defence organisation, is summoned by his superior, Colonel Ross, and transferred to a section headed by Major Dalby. Ross suspects that Radcliffe's disappearance is connected to the fact that sixteen other top British scientists have inexplicably left their jobs at the peak of their careers. He threatens to abolish Dalby's group if Radcliffe is not recovered. Palmer is assigned to replace the dead security escort.

Dalby orders his team to locate the main suspects, Eric Grantby and his chief of staff, codenamed "Bluejay" and "Housemartin" respectively. Palmer befriends Jock Carswell and, using a Scotland Yard contact, locates Grantby. When Palmer tries to prevent Grantby getting away, he is attacked by Housemartin. Housemartin is arrested later but, before he can be questioned, is killed by men impersonating Palmer and Carswell.

Palmer orders an abandoned factory searched. Radcliffe is not there, but an audiotape labelled "IPCRESS" is found that produces meaningless noise when played. Dalby and Palmer follow a lead to an upcoming military band concert where they encounter Grantby and strike a deal for Radcliffe's return. The exchange goes as planned but, as they are leaving, Palmer shoots a man in the shadows who turns out to be a CIA agent. Subsequently, another CIA operative threatens to kill Palmer if he discovers that the death was not a mistake.

As time passes it becomes clear that Radcliffe's mind had been affected and he can no longer function as a scientist. Carswell discovers a booklet titled "Induction of Psychoneurosis by Conditioned Reflex under Stress" – IPCRESS – which he believes explains what has happened to Radcliffe and the other scientists. Carswell borrows Palmer's car to test his theory on Radcliffe, but is shot dead before reaching him.

Believing he must have been the intended target, Palmer goes home to collect his belongings and discovers the body of the second CIA agent. When he returns to the office, the IPCRESS file is missing from his desk. Ross had previously asked him to microfilm the file, and Palmer reports to Dalby that he is being set up. Dalby tells him to leave town for a while.

Palmer is kidnapped en route to Paris and wakes up in an Albanian cell. After subjecting Palmer to several days without sleep, food and heat, Grantby reveals himself as his kidnapper and Palmer deduces they are preparing to brainwash him. He uses pain to distract himself, but after many stressful exposures to disorienting images and loud electronic sounds, he succumbs. Grantby instils a trigger phrase that will make Palmer follow any commands given to him.

Palmer escapes and discovers he is actually in London. He phones Dalby, not knowing Dalby is in Grantby's company, and he uses the trigger phrase. Palmer calls Ross to the warehouse where he had been held. As Dalby and Ross arrive, Palmer holds them both at gunpoint. Dalby accuses Ross of killing Carswell; Ross tells Palmer that he had been investigating Dalby.

Dalby uses the trigger phrase again and orders Palmer to "shoot the traitor now". Palmer wavers, and when his hand strikes a piece of equipment the pain reminds him of his conditioning. Dalby goes for his gun and Palmer shoots him.

Ross remarks that he expected Palmer's tendency to insubordination made him a useful candidate. Palmer reproaches Ross for endangering him, to which Ross replies that this is what he is paid for.

== Cast ==
- Michael Caine as Harry Palmer
- Guy Doleman as Colonel Ross
- Nigel Green as Major Dalby
- Sue Lloyd as Jean Courtney
- Gordon Jackson as Jock Carswell
- Aubrey Richards as Dr Radcliffe
- Frank Gatliff as Eric Grantby (Bluejay)
- Thomas Baptiste as Barney
- Oliver MacGreevy as Housemartin
- Freda Bamford as Alice
- Pauline Winter as Charlady
- Anthony Blackshaw as Edwards
- Barry Raymond as Gray
- David Glover as Chilcott-Oakes
- Stanley Meadows as Inspector Keightley
- Peter Ashmore as Sir Robert
- Michael Murray as Raid Inspector
- Anthony Baird as Raid Sergeant
- Tony Caunter as O.N.I. man
- Douglas Blackwell as Murray
- Glynn Edwards as Police Station Sergeant
- Ric Hutton as Records Officer

== Production ==
=== Development ===
Len Deighton was hired to write a screenplay for the James Bond film From Russia with Love, but later was let go because of a lack of progress. However, Deighton's brief involvement with Eon Productions led him to sell the film rights to his Harry Palmer novels to the Bond series co-producer Harry Saltzman, who had previously been known for producing "kitchen-sink realist" dramas. Among other crew members who worked on The Ipcress File and had also worked on the Bond films up to that point were the production designer Ken Adam, the film editor Peter Hunt and the film score composer John Barry. Saltzman told Deighton: "I'm the only producer who, you can be certain, won't make an imitation Bond film from your book".

Harry Saltzman gave Jimmy Sangster a copy of the novel to read. Sangster enjoyed the book and was eager to adapt the novel, suggesting Michael Caine to play the main role and Sidney J. Furie as director. However, Saltzman would not commit to the timeframe that Sangster insisted upon.

Sangster embellished Deighton's protagonist by removing the ambiguity of the novel. There, it is only in Chapter 5 that Palmer remarks, "My name isn't Harry, but in this business it's hard to remember whether it ever had been". But from the opening scenes of the film, Sangster's screenplay identifies Caine's character clearly as someone who cares little for authority, who indulges in quick repartee and has an interest in good food. Newspaper cuttings shown in Palmer's kitchen are actually cookery articles written for The Observer by Deighton, who was an accomplished cook himself. For a scene in which Palmer prepares a meal, Deighton attempted to teach Caine how to crack an egg with one hand, which Caine could not manage. As a result, the hands in close-up are really Deighton's.

The final screenplay included contributions by Sangster, Bill Canaway, James Doran, Lionel Davidson, Johanna Harwood, Lukas Heller, Ken Hughes, and Deighton himself. However, only Canaway and Doran were credited.

=== Filming ===
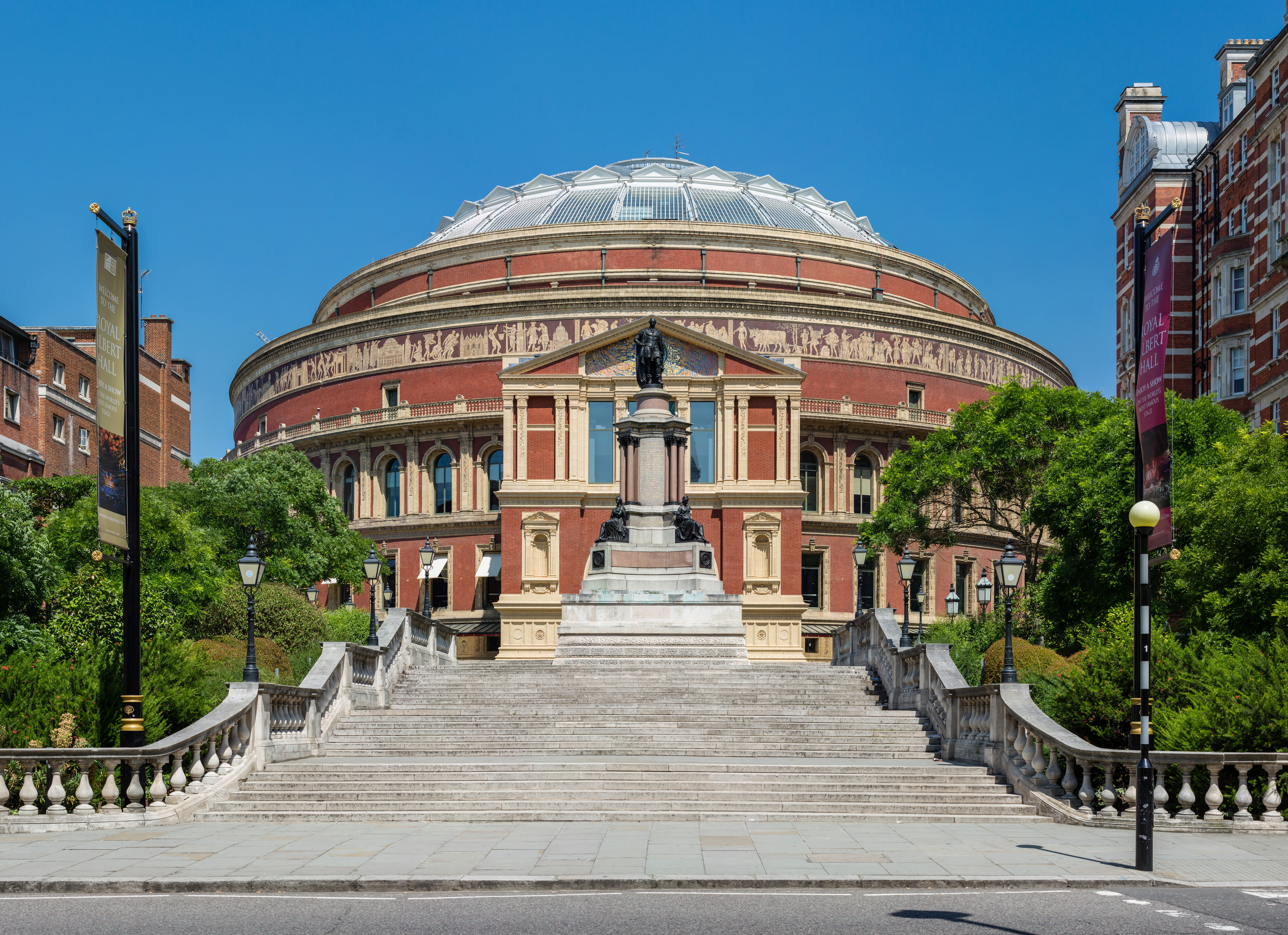
The Royal Albert Hall, where Harry Palmer follows Housemartin.

Saltzman wanted The Ipcress File to be an ironic and downbeat alternative to the portrayal of espionage in Ian Fleming's novels about Bond and the film series which followed from them. He also wanted it to be more in the style of his previous realist films. The Ipcress File therefore became the first of the nominally rival Harry Palmer series and some aspects are reminiscent of film noir. In contrast to Bond's public school background and playboy lifestyle, Palmer is a working-class Londoner who lives in a Notting Hill bedsit and has to put up with red tape and interdepartmental rivalries. The action is set entirely in "a gritty, gloomy, decidedly non-swinging" London with humdrum locations, aside from the Royal Albert Hall.

The film was made at Pinewood Studios with sets designed by the art directors Peter Murton and Ken Adam. The film was shot on location around London in the widescreen screen ratio using Techniscope. In this format, the normal 35mm film frame is split in half horizontally, with each frame now taking up only half of the perforations on the edges of the film stock (two, rather than the usual four). The format was introduced by Technicolor Italia in 1963 and allowed for a greater depth of field as it was shot with lenses of shorter focal length than those used in the anamorphic widescreen processes. This allowed cinematographer Otto Heller to construct images in deep focus, shooting from behind objects and allowing both the objects in the foreground and the action taking place in the background to be in focus. Many years later, in an interview for the DVD release, Caine revealed that Heller, a Czech Jew who had only made it out of Nazi Germany as late as 1939, pretended throughout his career in Britain to read his light meter. Heller's instrument was found after he died to have been "dead forever"; he had seen other cameramen using one, and felt obliged to give the impression that he too was using one. However, Caine said, Heller was such a brilliant director of photography that he would light scenes "wonderfully" using only eyesight.

=== Sound ===
John Barry, who had worked on all of the Bond films up to this time, composed the music score for the soundtrack. As opposed to the electric guitar which carried the melody in the "James Bond Theme", Barry made prominent use of a cimbalom.

The complex electronic sound effect of the brain-washing process was conceived by sound engineer Norman Wanstall and created by the BBC Radiophonic Workshop.

== Reception ==
When the film premiered at the Leicester Square Theatre in London on 18 March 1965, the film critic for The Times had mixed feelings about it. While enjoying the first part of the film, and generally praising Michael Caine, the critic found the second half bewildering to the extent that the characters "cease to be pleasantly mystifying and become just irritatingly obscure." A review in Variety was largely positive, describing the film as "anti-Bond" for its unglamorous depiction of espionage, and praising Caine's understated performance but criticising the sometimes "arty-crafty" camera work.

=== Legacy ===
Subsequently, the film has come to be recognised as a classic. The Ipcress File is included on the British Film Institute's BFI 100, a list of 100 of the best British films of the 20th century, at No. 59. The review website Rotten Tomatoes sampled 31 critics resulting in an aggregate rating of 97% "Fresh".

Filmink wrote that "the movie was famous for being 'anti-Bond', which it was to a degree: it was still about a sexy agent who beds women, has sophistication (he's a cook), outsmarts the bad guys and is cocky to his superiors – but he wears glasses, is unapologetically working class, and has to fill out forms and deal with bureaucracy."

=== Accolades ===
Institution	Year	Category	Nominee	Result
BAFTA Award	1966	Best British Film	Sidney J. Furie	Won
BAFTA Award	1966	Best British Screenplay	Bill Canaway, James Doran	Nominated
BAFTA Award	1966	Best Actor in a Leading Role	Michael Caine	Nominated
BAFTA Award	1966	Best British Cinematography (Colour)	Otto Heller	Won
BAFTA Award	1966	Best British Art Direction (Colour)	Ken Adam	Won
Cannes Film Festival	1965	Palme d'Or	Sidney J. Furie	Nominated
Directors Guild of America Award	1966	Outstanding Directing – Feature Film	Sidney J. Furie	Nominated
Edgar Allan Poe Award	1966	Best Foreign Film Screenplay	Bill Canaway, James Doran	Won

== Subsequent works ==
=== Sequels ===
There were two immediate theatrical film sequels starring Caine as Harry Palmer: Funeral in Berlin (1966) and Billion Dollar Brain (1967).

Decades later Michael Caine returned to the character in two made-for-television films produced by Harry Alan Towers: Bullet to Beijing (1995) and Midnight in Saint Petersburg (1996).

=== Television ===
A television adaptation of the same name, directed by James Watkins and starring Joe Cole as Palmer, premiered on ITV on 6 March 2022.

== See also ==
- BFI Top 100 British films
- The Ipcress File (disambiguation)
