= Howard Loxton =

British theatre critic and writer

Howard Loxton is a British theatre critic and writer. Loxton is currently a theatre critic for The British Theatre Guide.

Loxton was born in Birmingham, England, in 1934. He received an MA in modern drama.

Loxton previously worked as a stage and television actor and as stage manager of the English Opera Group. Loxton co-founded a journal about television, called Viewpoint, and worked as a freelance journalist, having interviews published in The Guardian and other media outlets. Loxton has also worked as an editor for publishers Paul Hamlyn and Jonathan Cape. He supervises the annual Theatre Book Prize for the Society for Theatre Research.

Loxton is the author of several books on theatre and history, including:

- Shakespeare Country 2000
- The Golden Age of the Circus 1997
- Theatre 1989
- Shakespeare's Theatre 1994
- The Murder of Thomas Becket 1971
- The Battle of Agincourt 1968
- Christmas 1992
- The Assassination of President Kennedy (with Michael Rand and Len Deighton) 1967
- Railways 1963
- Westminster Abbey (with Lawrence Edward Tanner and Nicholas H. MacMichael) 1971
- Mazes and Labyrinths (with Adrian Fisher) 2000
- Garden: Celebration 1991
- Encyclopedia of Saints 1996
- Pilgrimage to Canterbury 1978
- The Art of Angels 1995
- Secrets of the Maze: An Interactive Guide to the World's Most Amazing Mazes (with Adrian Fisher) 2008

Loxton has also authored books about dogs, birds, horses, and cats.

- The Beauty of Cats 1972
- Beautiful Cats 1980
- The Beauty of Big Cats 1973
- A Superguide to Cats 1989
- Guide to Cats of the World 1977
- Caring for Your Cat 1989
- The Cat Repair Handbook: the Practical Guide to Feline Health Care 1985
- Noble Cat: Aristocrat of the Animal World 2000
- Encyclopedia of the Cat (with Angela Rixon) 2002
- Guide to Cats of the World 1991
- In Search of Cats 1976
- Spotter's Guide to Cats 2001
- Cats and Kittens 1984
- Cats: An Exeter Leisure Guide 1981
- 99 Lives: Cats in History, Legend, and Literature 1999

Loxton's books have been translated into German, French, and Italian.
