= Fighter: The True Story of the Battle of Britain =

1977 non-fiction history book by Len Deighton

- First edition
- Author: Len Deighton
- Language: English
- Genre: Non-fiction
- Publisher: Jonathan Cape
- Publication date: 1977
- ISBN: 1845951069

Fighter: The True Story of the Battle of Britain (ISBN 1845951069) is a Second World War military history book by English author Len Deighton. First published in 1977, it was Deighton's first history book although he had made his name as a writer of spy fiction. Deighton was encouraged to write the book by his friend, the British historian AJP Taylor, who wrote its introduction.

The book covers the traditional period of the Battle of Britain and the buildup to it and describes the war in the air as much from the German point of view as the British one.

Deighton explains both the political and personal machinations and how they influenced technical decisions and affected the efforts of both countries. There are short biographies of the major "players" from the commanders down to the pilots in the field. It covers the errors made in the strategic, tactical and technical decisions made by both sides and does so with remarkable objectivity.

Many myths about the Battle addressed are punctured by Deighton, which leaves one to conclude that the Royal Air Force (RAF) achieved its main aim, merely to survive as an effective fighting force, largely because it made fewer mistakes than the Luftwaffe.

The description of RAF Manston ground crew, under repeated attack, remaining against orders in their air raid shelters and refusing to carry out their duties is also called a myth.

Air Chief Marshal Hugh Dowding is Deighton's hero in the book and was one of the few people who perceived the situation accurately. Deighton argues that his strategy prevented a German victory. Despite winning the battle, Dowding was very badly treated by the Whitehall bureaucracy and dismissed, along with Keith Park, commander of 11 Group which had borne the brunt of the fighting, shortly after the victory.
