= Billion Dollar Brain =

1967 British film by Ken Russell

- American film poster
- Directed by: Ken Russell
- Screenplay by: John McGrath
- Based on: Billion-Dollar Brain by Len Deighton
- Produced by: Harry Saltzman
- Starring: Michael Caine; Karl Malden; Ed Begley; Oscar Homolka; Françoise Dorléac
- Cinematography: Billy Williams
- Edited by: Alan Osbiston
- Music by: Richard Rodney Bennett
- Production companies: Lowndes Productions; Jovera S.A.
- Distributed by: United Artists
- Release date: 16 November 1967 (UK)
- Running time: 111 minutes
- Country: United Kingdom
- Language: English
- Box office: $1.5 million (Note: $1.5 millions in 1967, worth today $15 millions, ajusted for inflation.) (US/Canada)

Billion Dollar Brain is a 1967 British espionage film directed by Ken Russell and based on the 1966 novel Billion-Dollar Brain by Len Deighton. The film features Michael Caine as secret agent Harry Palmer, the anti-hero protagonist. The "brain" of the title is a sophisticated computer with which an anti-communist organisation controls its worldwide anti-Soviet spy network.

Billion Dollar Brain is the third of the Harry Palmer film series, preceded by The Ipcress File (1965) and Funeral in Berlin (1966). It is the only film in which Ken Russell worked as a mainstream 'director-for-hire', and the last film of Françoise Dorléac. A fourth film in the series, an adaptation of Horse Under Water, also to be released by United Artists, was tentatively planned but never made. Caine played Palmer in two later films, Bullet to Beijing and Midnight in Saint Petersburg.

== Plot ==
Harry Palmer, who has left MI5 to work as a private investigator, is told by a mechanical voice on the phone to take a package to Helsinki. The package contains six virus-laden eggs that have been stolen from the government of the United Kingdom's research facility at Porton Down. In Helsinki, he is met by Anya, who takes him to meet her handler, Harry's old friend Leo Newbigen. Leo is in love with Anya, but Harry sees that she is only pretending to reciprocate.

After determining that he cannot trust either Leo or Anya, Harry is abducted by his former MI5 superior, Colonel Ross, who coerces him into working once more for the British government in pursuing the conspiracy and getting the eggs back. Leo takes Harry to a secret room where a computer issues daily instructions to the local team, speaking in the same voice that summoned Harry to Helsinki. The computer orders Leo to kill Anya, but he doesn't. All go to meet a scientist who assesses the value of the eggs and Harry is introduced as a new operator.

Harry is ordered to Soviet-occupied Latvia, where he joins rebels to obtain intelligence. After being captured and left for dead, Harry is set free by Colonel Stok, an old acquaintance from the KGB. Back in Helsinki, Anya tries to kill Harry while seducing him, then confesses that the computer told her to kill him. Harry locks her in a room and waits for Leo at the computer. Leo offers to pay off Harry for his trouble, but Harry insists on half of the money Leo is getting from whatever the conspiracy is all about.

The pair go to Texas, where Harry meets oil tycoon General Midwinter, who proudly displays his billion-dollar "brain", a room full of computers dispensing orders to his agents around the world. The General is planning a rebellion in Latvia, which he thinks will trigger the fall of Communism worldwide. He thinks Leo has hired hundreds of Latvian agents but there are only a handful, as Leo is pocketing the money. The General plans to begin a rebellion using these agents while his private army invades to back them and simultaneously infect the Red Army with the viruses. Leo subverts Midwinter's computer orders and escapes with the eggs. Midwinter realises Harry is a double agent but Harry tells him what Leo is doing and convinces him that he can track Leo down.

Back in Helsinki, Leo and Anya board a train for Moscow with the eggs but Harry, accompanied by two of Midwinter's men, chases the train in a car, intercepts it and escorts Leo off the train with the eggs. Anya shoots Harry's bodyguards as the train pulls away from a station near the border. Leo runs after the train with the eggs. Anya takes them, but pushes him off the train. "She used me", Leo tells Harry. He then offers to help Harry stop Midwinter's insane plan, which could trigger World War III.

In personnel carriers disguised as his company's oil tanker trucks, Midwinter leads his private army across the frozen Gulf of Finland into Latvia. Harry and Leo attempt to catch up with the General but he orders their car to be fired on and Leo is killed. Stok knows all about the invasion and orders bombers to intercept the convoy. Rather than bombing it directly, they simply drop the bombs on the ice in its path. The convoy plunges through the ice into the freezing water and all the vehicles and soldiers—including General Midwinter—sink to an icy Baltic grave.

Harry awakes alone on an ice floe. Stok arrives in a helicopter with Anya, introducing her as his agent. He gives the eggs to Harry, explaining, "We don't need them; we have our own ideas". Back in London, Harry delivers the eggs to Ross, who agrees to reward Harry with a promotion. When he opens the package to inspect the eggs, he finds it full of chicks.

== Cast ==
- Michael Caine as Harry Palmer
- Karl Malden as Leo Newbigen
- Ed Begley as General Midwinter
- Oscar Homolka as Colonel Stok
- Françoise Dorléac as Anya
- Guy Doleman as Colonel Ross
- Vladek Sheybal as Doctor Eiwort
- John Brandon as Jim
- Milo Sperber as Basil
- Susan George as Latvian Girl on Train
- Stanley Caine as GPO Special Delivery Boy
- Fred Griffiths as Taxi Driver

Cast notes:

- Donald Sutherland has a very small appearance as the computer technician who asks Karl Malden, "What's going on?" Sutherland also appears as the mechanical voice on the phone at the beginning of the film.
- Susan George makes an early appearance as a young Latvian girl on a train who offers her copy of Izvestia to Michael Caine.

== Production ==
=== Development ===
Film rights were purchased by Harry Saltzman in November 1965, prior to the novel's publication in January 1966. Saltzman paid $250,000; he had already bought the rights to The Ipcress File and Funeral in Berlin. The book became a best seller. The New York Times called it "a strikingly effective thriller".

In January 1966, Caine announced he had signed with Saltzman to make 11 films in five years, with three of the films to be Harry Palmer stories by Len Deighton: Funeral in Berlin, Billion Dollar Brain and a fourth, mostly likely Horse Under Water.

=== Russell as director ===
Ken Russell was a highly regarded television director who had made one unsuccessful feature. Caine narrated a series of Russell's films and became friendly with the director; he recommended him to Saltzman for Billion Dollar Brain. Caine later said this was a mistake, although Russell was "an emotional genius. Billion Dollar Brain is a highly complicated thriller which needs a draftsman. The last thing you need is an emotional genius." Russell wanted to make a film about Nijinsky with Rudolph Nureyev and Saltzman was interested. He suggested Russell make Billion Dollar Brain to "keep his hand in." "We never quite realised we had a lunatic genius on our hands" said Caine in 1976. "He was the least ideal man to do a thriller. What he has is this passion to make thundering great messes." In January 1967, it was announced Russell would direct from a script by John McGrath, with Oscar Homolka reprising his role from Funeral in Berlin.

=== Shooting ===
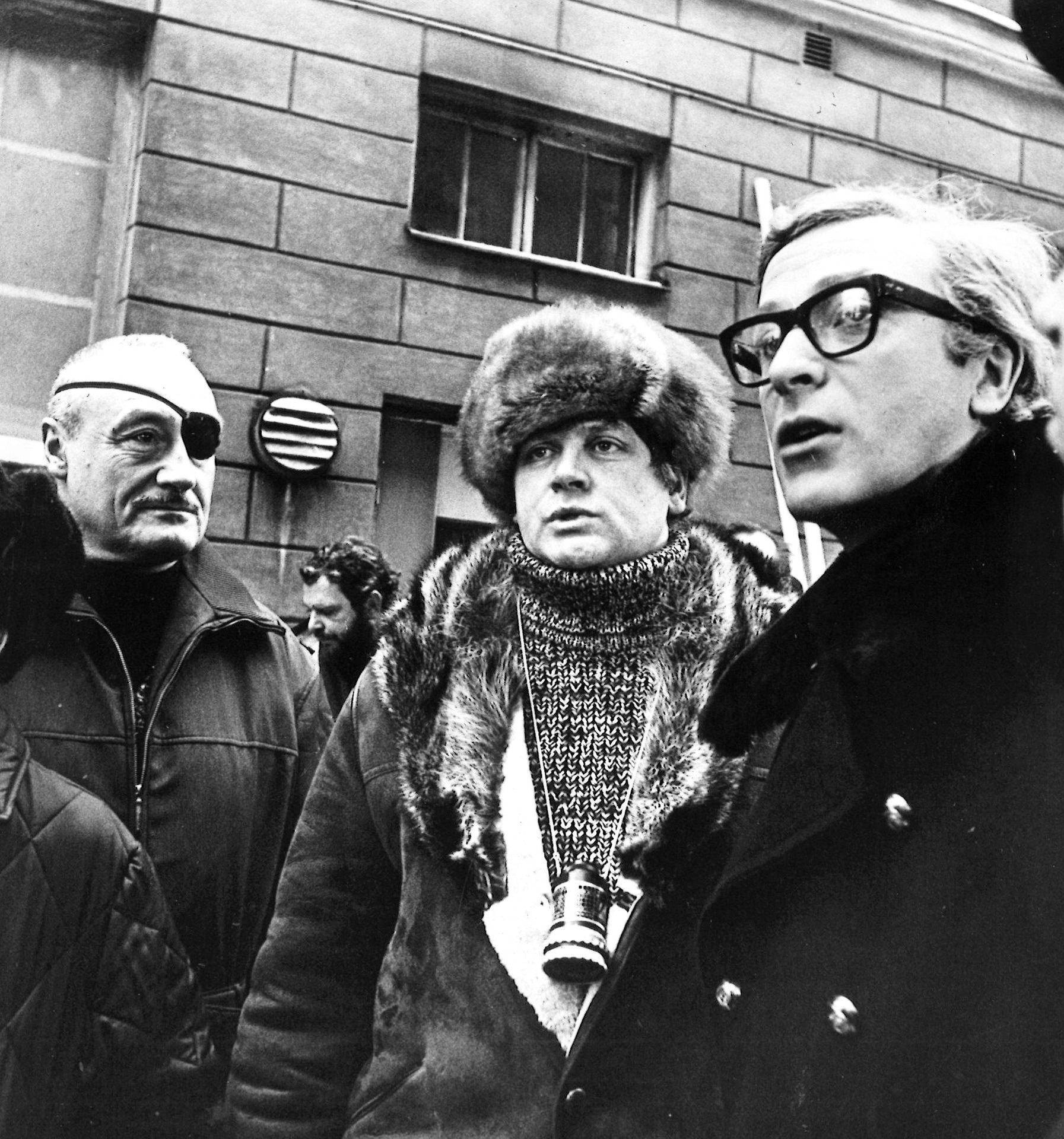
Andre de Toth, Ken Russell and Michael Caine in Helsinki, February 1967, when the shooting began there.

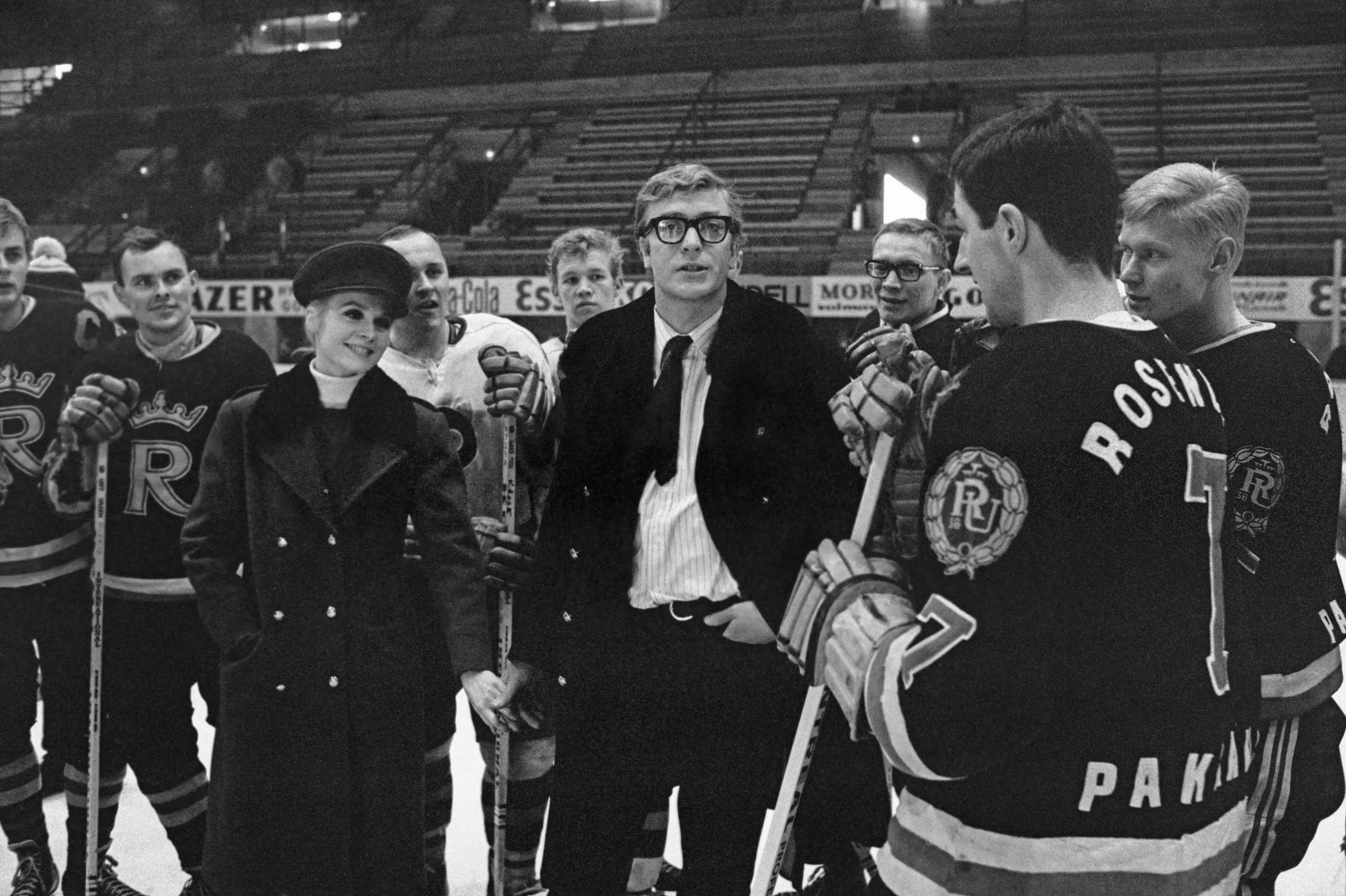
Finnish ice hockey club RU-38 performed an ice hockey fight with Karhu-Kissat for the film.

Principal photography took place from 30 January to the end of May 1967.

Approximately five weeks later, on 26 June, Françoise Dorléac was killed in an automobile accident in Nice, France. It is unclear whether or not her voice was dubbed by another actress, due to her death.

Location filming for Billion Dollar Brain took place in Helsinki and other parts of Finland, including Turku. The Riga scenes were filmed in Porvoo, also in Finland. Scenes involving "The Brain" were filmed in Honeywell facilities and featured a Honeywell 200 business computer. The remainder of the film was shot in the United Kingdom. Scenes on the ice were filmed on a disused airfield which was covered with a layer of salt. All other scenes were shot at Pinewood Studios, including the scene where Midwinter's convoy falls through the broken ice – this was done in a giant tank with slabs of polystyrene used to represent the ice itself. The large size of the tank was deemed necessary because of the decision to use real vehicles instead of miniatures.

Otto Heller – who had photographed the first two Harry Palmer films – was supposed to shoot the film but would not submit to a medical examination and so the production could not hire him.

The final battle on the ice was inspired by Sergei Eisenstein's 1938 film Alexander Nevsky.

Michael Caine's brother Stanley made his film debut as a postman in the opening sequence.

Russell later said "it was a mistake" to make the film. "I was working with people I did not know. I was not enjoying them. One felt all the time they were working for the producer against me... It was a pity. But only because of the time wasted. You lose a year of your life when you could have been doing something better." However the film was liked by David Picker at United Artists who later hired Russell for Women in Love.

Andre de Toth worked on the film as a producer and said Russell ultimately "did a fine job on the film."

== Soundtrack ==
The score is by Richard Rodney Bennett. To create a relentless, harsh mood, he left out sweet-sounding instruments like violins and flutes and relied mainly on brass and percussion including three pianos, which are featured prominently in the main theme, and later, together with the percussion, create sonorities similar to Stravinsky's Les Noces. The score is basically monothematic, constantly varying the main theme. For more romantic moods, it features the ondes Martenot, an early electronic instrument, played by its most prominent soloist, Jeanne Loriod. Thus, even the tender moments have an eerie undertone.

Later on, Harry Palmer attends the end of a symphony concert, which is supposed to feature Dmitri Shostakovich's "Leningrad" Symphony, written in 1941 during the siege of Leningrad. What we hear, however, is the end of Shostakovich's 11th Symphony "The Year 1905". Yet, music from the "Leningrad" symphony is featured later on during Midwinter's speech to his soldiers in Finland and during the final battle on the ice.

== Reception ==
Author and critic Anne Billson calls this "by far" the best film of the series, noting that critics and audiences did not like it on first release.

The Guardian called it "just terrible". "What rubbish it all is," said The Observer.

TV Guide says, "Overly plotted and almost without humour, The Billion Dollar Brain (which takes its name from the computer Midwinter uses to plan his invasion) is not nearly as entertaining as its predecessors in the Harry Palmer trilogy, The Ipcress File and Funeral in Berlin.

Michael Caine thought the visuals were "stunning" but felt "Ken Russell lost the story somewhere and no one could care a damn about what was going on because they couldn't follow what was going on."
