= Israel: A Right to Live =

- Directed by: John Schlesinger
- Written by: Wolf Mankowitz
- Produced by: Harry Saltzman
- Cinematography: Anthony B. Richmond
- Release date: 1967
- Running time: 53 minutes

Israel: A Right to Live is a 1967 documentary shot in Israel about the Six-Day War. John Schlesinger directed and Harry Saltzman produced. Anthony B. Richmond photographed the 16 mm film. Wolf Mankowitz wrote the narration; David Samuelson was a camera assistant. The film is believed to be lost.

== Production ==
Filmmaker and author Alan Rosenthal claims that the film was very "pro-Zionist" and would show "the new Israel, the new spirit." In December 1967, an Israeli reporter Haggai Eshed attended a private London screening of Saltzman's "film about Israel", noting that after the screening it was decided that some further changes should be made to the film. Eshed described the film he saw as "the best propaganda film ever produced about Israel", adding that it especially succeeds in two aspects: "It illustrates the Jewish background of the establishment of the State of Israel and of the Six-Day War, and it successfully brings to life through cinematic techniques the experience of Jerusalem’s reunification and of the Jewish people’s reunion with the Western Wall.” Saltzman, Mankowitz and Schlesinger were all Jewish. Saltzman was also chairman of the "Show Business Aid for Israel" committee.

Schlesinger flew to Israel—he'd never been there before—and shot considerable footage. For Schlesinger, this was "a sense of reclaiming his heritage" and he found the experience "quite moving."

== Current status ==
Cinematographer Richmond claimed in 2011 that he's never been able to find a copy of the documentary. Alan Rosenthal claims that "hours of film had been shot and edited, but nobody liked the result. Israel was too triumphant, too out of keeping with the changed mood. It had a few showings and then passed into oblivion." On the other hand, William J. Mann claims that Schlesinger never finished the documentary "due to 'creative differences' with the BBC."

The British National Archives contains several items pertaining to the film. These include "colour and black & white photographs"; a 7 December 1967 letter from the Israeli Embassy in London "congratulating Schlesinger" on his work in the documentary; a 5 October 1967 list of potential titles for the documentary; and a transcript of interviews filmed for the documentary.

== See also ==
- List of lost films
