= Harry Palmer =

Fictional secret agent

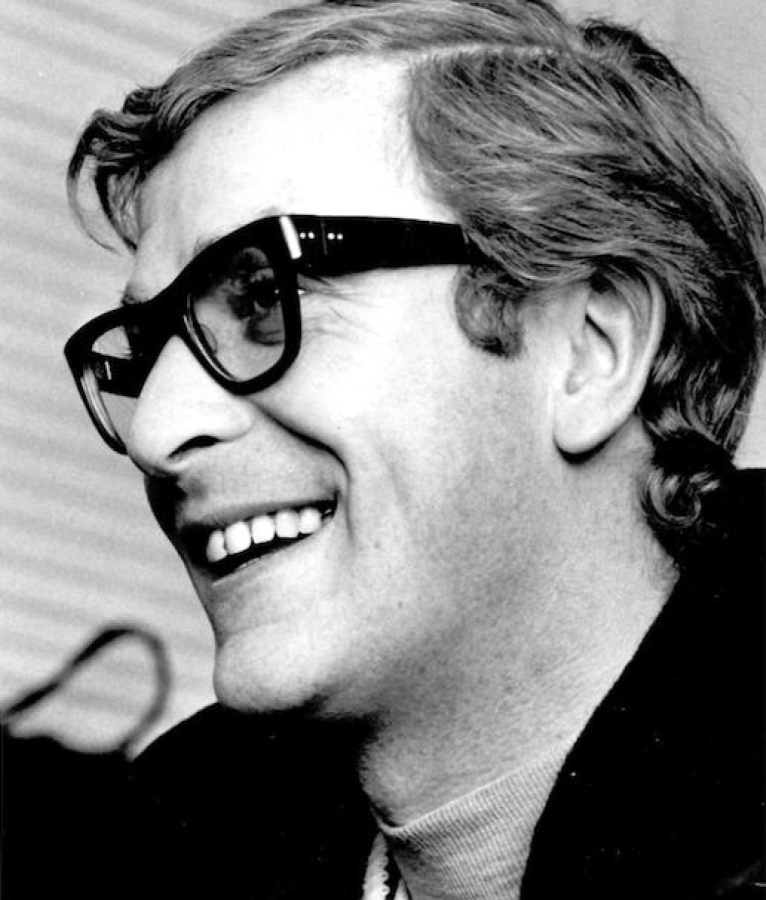
- Michael Caine in 1967
- First appearance: The Ipcress File (1965)
- Last appearance: Midnight in Saint Petersburg (1996)
- Created by: Len Deighton
- Portrayed by: Michael Caine; Joe Cole

Harry Palmer is the name given to the anti-hero protagonist of several films based on spy novels written by Len Deighton, in which the main character is an unnamed intelligence officer. For convenience, the novels are also often referred to as the "Harry Palmer" novels.

Michael Caine played Harry Palmer in three films based on published novels featuring this character: The Ipcress File (1965), Funeral in Berlin (1966) and Billion Dollar Brain (1967). Caine also starred as this character in two later films not directly based on Deighton's novels – Bullet to Beijing (1995) and Midnight in Saint Petersburg (1996).

The Times called Caine "the epitome of Sixties cool in his first outing as the secret agent Harry Palmer". A trailer for his second role as Palmer described him as possessing "horn rims, cockney wit and an iron fist". The character's thick horn-rimmed glasses, girls, and disregard for authority were cited by Mike Myers as an influence for Austin Powers; Caine would later star in Austin Powers in Goldmember (2002), with his portrayal of Nigel Powers, father of secret agent Austin Powers, a spoof of Palmer.

== Origin of the 'Harry Palmer' name ==
When developing the 1965 film The Ipcress File, based on Len Deighton's 1962 novel of the same name, the production team needed a name for the previously anonymous protagonist, a rough-edged, petty crook turned spy. They chose "Harry Palmer", because they wanted a mundane name, 'one that means absolutely nothing, a common name', to distance him from Ian Fleming's James Bond, the stereotypical sophisticated, swashbuckling spy. Caine stated at the time of filming that he knew a dull kid at school called "Palmer", with Harry Saltzman saying 'good, and what about a first name?', to which Caine innocently remarked "Harry", not realising his gaffe until seeing Saltzman's stare.

== Appearances ==
Novel	Film	Lead actor	Notes
The IPCRESS File (1962)	The Ipcress File (1965)	Michael Caine	
The IPCRESS File (1962)	The Ipcress File (2022 TV series)	Joe Cole	
Horse Under Water (1963)			Not adapted to a film
Funeral in Berlin (1964)	Funeral in Berlin (1966)	Michael Caine	
Billion-Dollar Brain (1966)	Billion Dollar Brain (1967)	Michael Caine	
An Expensive Place to Die (1967)			Not adapted to a film
Spy Story (1974)	Spy Story (1976)	Michael Petrovitch	Character is renamed 'Patrick Armstrong'
Yesterday's Spy (1975)			Not adapted to a film
Twinkle, Twinkle, Little Spy (1976)			North American title: Catch a Falling Spy
	Bullet to Beijing (1995)	Michael Caine	Not based on a Len Deighton novel
	Midnight in Saint Petersburg (1996)	Michael Caine	Not based on a Len Deighton novel

== Novels ==
=== Early novels ===
Len Deighton introduced the lead character in The IPCRESS File, his first novel, published in November 1962. In that first-person novel, the intelligence officer is anonymous, although at one point he is greeted by someone saying, "Hello, Harry"; he later says, "Now my name isn't Harry, but in this business it's hard to remember whether it ever had been." Deighton's character is described as working class, living in a back street flat and seedy hotels, and shopping in supermarkets. He wears glasses, is hindered by bureaucracy, and craves a pay rise. It is revealed in passing that he is from Burnley, Lancashire, and that he was born in 1922 or 1923.

Further novels featuring this character followed, including Horse Under Water (1963), Funeral in Berlin (1964), Billion-Dollar Brain (1966), and An Expensive Place to Die (1967). Again, the lead character is never named, but they appear to be the same character in all of the books. In his 2009 afterword to Horse Under Water, Deighton noted "Now, writing a second book, I found it an advantage to have an anonymous hero. He might be the same man; or maybe not. I was able to make minor changes to him and his background...I realized that...identifying him as a northerner would make demands on my knowledge that I could not sustain. It would be more sensible to give him a background closer to my own."

From the first novel onwards, the narrator shows knowledge of fine food and drink, painting, classical and 20th-century music, jazz, military history, and Latin. In Horse Under Water, he is described as an expert on world currency.

=== Later novels and discrepancies ===
In 1974, the novel Spy Story was published, followed by Yesterday's Spy (1975), and Twinkle, Twinkle, Little Spy (1976) (also known as Catch a Falling Spy in North America). As the protagonist also remains anonymous in these novels, it is still open to debate whether the narrator of these last three novels is the same as in the earlier books.

There is conflicting evidence for either view, though Deighton himself wrote in his introduction to the 2012 reissue of Twinkle, Twinkle, Little Spy "Is this a Harry Palmer story I am sometimes asked, and the answer is 'yes'", and Arnold Scwartzman's note on the cover illustration states that the back-cover montage includes "a pair of 'our hero's glasses' that look suspiciously like those worn by 'Harry Palmer' in The Ipcress File and other outings." Despite the lead protagonist being unnamed, all eight books have been unofficially called the Harry Palmer novels, based on the protagonist's name given in the subsequent film adaptations of The IPCRESS File and its sequels.

Evidence for this narrator being different from the earlier novels comes from Deighton himself, who is quoted as saying that the narrator of Spy Story is not the same character as the narrator of The IPCRESS File; in fact, for most of Spy Story, the narrator is named and addressed as "Patrick Armstrong" – although, as another character says, "We have so many different names." Additionally, he is reported to be in his late 30s, whereas the narrator of The IPCRESS File was born in 1922 or 1923 (making him in his 40s), and thus implying that this protagonist is different from that of the earlier novels.

Encouraging the unitary concept – that the later novels feature the same narrator – is the 1974 dust jacket to the Harcourt, Brace & Jovanovich American edition of Spy Story, in which the cover blurb states, "He is back, after five long-years' absence, the insubordinate, decent, bespectacled English spy who fought, fumbled, and survived his outrageous way through the best-selling Horse Under Water, Funeral in Berlin, and the rest of those marvellous, celebrated Len Deighton spy thrillers." Likewise, on the 1976 edition dust jacket to Catch a Falling Spy, the novel features "Deighton's familiar hero, our bespectacled Englishman". A number of minor characters from the earlier novels also appear in Spy Story, further connecting the books.

== Film adaptations ==
=== The Ipcress File ===
The IPCRESS File novel came out just after the release of the first James Bond film Dr. No (1962). When the novel reached best-seller status, Eon Productions film producers Harry Saltzman and Albert R. Broccoli approached Deighton to write the script for the second Bond film, From Russia with Love (1963). Little of Deighton's screenplay was actually used on the shoot. Saltzman decided instead to make use of The IPCRESS File in the expectation of beginning a new secret-agent film series. Unlike the Bond films, The Ipcress File was designed to have a somewhat different, mostly rather naturalistic style, with hints of the kitchen sink school, film adaptations of which Saltzman had produced. Saltzman, however, also contracted crew members who had worked on the Bond films, including production designer Ken Adam, film editor Peter Hunt, and film score composer John Barry. Michael Caine was chosen to play the lead role.

In the film version, Harry Palmer is a British Army sergeant forcibly drafted into the security services to work away a prison sentence for black marketeering. He worked first for Army Intelligence, then the Foreign Office. He works for the brilliant but slightly duplicitous Colonel Ross. Harry Palmer has much in common with Deighton, including passions for military history (Harvey Newbegin complains about his bookshelf contents in Billion Dollar Brain), cooking, and classical music.

=== Sequels ===
After the release of The Ipcress File (1965), Saltzman's production company made Funeral in Berlin (1966) and Billion Dollar Brain (1967), both starring Michael Caine. The second Harry Palmer novel Horse Under Water was not used. In 1976, Deighton's novel Spy Story was filmed with Michael Petrovitch as 'Patrick Armstrong'; it is unrelated to Saltzman's Harry Palmer films.

In the mid-1990s, two further Harry Palmer films were released, this time with original screenplays and with Michael Caine returning to the role. These were Bullet to Beijing (1995) and Midnight in Saint Petersburg (1996). Despite sometimes being titled Len Deighton's Bullet to Beijing and Len Deighton's Midnight in St Petersburg, Deighton did not participate in the production of these films.

=== Allusions ===
Evidence of Michael Caine's popular identification as Harry Palmer can be seen in films such as Blue Ice (1992), where he plays an ex-spy named 'Harry', and who has many similarities to Harry Palmer.

Caine's Harry Palmer character (with the glasses, the girls, and disregard for authority) was an influence for Mike Myers’ spy action comedy films Austin Powers. At Myers's request, Caine starred in Austin Powers in Goldmember (2002), with his portrayal of Nigel Powers, father of secret agent Austin Powers, a spoof of Harry Palmer.

In Kingsman: The Secret Service (2014), Caine portrays the bespectacled head of a secret espionage unit.

== Television ==
A television adaptation of the same name, directed by James Watkins and starring Joe Cole as Palmer, premiered on ITV on 6 March 2022.
