= Blood, Tears and Folly =

1993 book by Len Deighton

Blood, Tears and Folly: An Objective Look at World War II
- Author: Len Deighton
- Publisher: Jonathan Cape, HarperCollins Publishers
- Publication date: 1993
- Pages: xvii, 653 pages
- ISBN: 006017000X
- OCLC: 29292722
- LC Class: D743 .D45 1993

Blood, Tears and Folly: An Objective Look at World War II is a 1993 book by Len Deighton published by Jonathan Cape. It is a history of World War II from an alternative viewpoint. Deighton looks for the origins of the war, from the rise of the great power conflicts that led to the First World War, through the inter-war years and the histories of the various conflicts and combatants in the years up until the beginning of the war in 1939.

He traces the early engagements, the feints, the so-called Phoney War, right through until Japan attacks Pearl Harbor in 1941. Deighton attempts to create an encyclopedic introduction to the conflict by building up a detailed background and showing how perilous Britain's early situation was, the early blunders by Winston Churchill in the Norwegian Campaign and the British dealings with the French that led to the debacle of Dunkirk.

== Critical response ==
In its review, Kirkus Reviews criticizes the lack of "original research, let alone fresh perspectives" and states that the book "covers ground that will be familiar to even casual students of the war's initial phase".

== See also ==
- Allies at War by Tim Bouverie (2025)
- The Second World War by Antony Beevor (2012).
- Inferno: The World at War, 1939-1945 by Max Hastings (2011).
- The Storm of War by Andrew Roberts (2009).
