= Bullet to Beijing =

1995 television film directed by George Mihalka

- Genre: Thriller
- Based on: Characters by Len Deighton
- Screenplay by: Peter Welbeck
- Directed by: George Mihalka
- Starring: Michael Caine; Jason Connery; Mia Sara; Michael Sarrazin; Michael Gambon; Burt Kwouk; Sue Lloyd
- Music by: Rick Wakeman
- Countries of origin: Canada; United Kingdom; Russia
- Original language: English

Production
- Executive producer: Harry Alan Towers
- Producers: Aleksandr Golutva; John Dunning; André Link
- Production locations: London; St. Petersburg, Russia
- Cinematography: Peter Benison; Terry Cole
- Editor: François Gill
- Running time: 101 minutes, 124 minutes (Special Edition)
- Production companies: Quebec 3099-3018; Harry Palmer Productions; Lenfilm

Original release
- Network: Showtime
- Release: August 16, 1995

Related
- Midnight in Saint Petersburg (1996)

Bullet to Beijing is a 1995 made-for-television film that continues the adventures of the fictional spy Harry Palmer, who appeared in the 1960s films The Ipcress File, Funeral in Berlin and Billion Dollar Brain, based on books by author Len Deighton. Though an alternative title is Len Deighton's Bullet to Beijing, Deighton was not associated with the film.

The 1996 sequel Midnight in Saint Petersburg was filmed back-to-back with this film.

== Plot ==
Harry Palmer is forced into early retirement from MI5. He receives a telephone call offering a mysterious job opportunity. Later he is given an air ticket to Saint Petersburg and on arrival is met by a young man named Nikolai. They are followed and shot at by Chechens, before Nick (as Harry insists on calling him) and Natasha can deliver Harry to his potential employer, Alex. Alex tells Harry that a deadly binary biological weapon called Alorex has been stolen; he wants Harry to find it. Harry cannot turn down the pay: $250,000.

Louis, one of his old contacts, tells him that the Alorex will be on a train, the Bullet to Beijing. Ex-KGB Colonel Gradsky and his men are also passengers, as are Nick, Natasha and Craig Warner, yet another unemployed spy, this time formerly with the CIA. When Harry and Nick try to find out what is in the crate Gradsky is transporting to the North Korean embassy, Gradsky (as a professional courtesy) merely has them thrown off the train. Conveniently, though they are in Siberia, there is an airport nearby and they are able to board a crowded, ramshackle Aeroflot aircraft. Though the plane runs out of fuel and has to set down 300 miles from the train's next stop, Harry and Nick just barely manage to get back aboard the Bullet.

When they go to confront Gradsky, they receive several surprises. Natasha, whom they find in the colonel's compartment, turns out to be Gradsky's daughter. Then they learn that Gradsky also works for Alex. Finally, Harry guesses that Alex is selling the Alorex to the North Koreans for heroin, a specialty of Craig's. Nick, who sincerely thinks that Alex is the man to lead Russia in the troubled times ahead, refuses to believe it. Harry talks Gradsky into dumping his half of the Alorex and replacing it with vodka and urine. Then, Harry remembers that Louis' grandson had given him a seemingly innocent gift, a Matryoshka doll. Inside, he finds a vial which is the second deadly component.

Nevertheless, they have to pretend to deliver the Alorex. At the North Korean embassy, Palmer meets another old spy acquaintance, Kim Soo, who has orders to get rid of Harry because he knows too much. Nick rescues him by telephoning to say that Alex will deal with him later. Afterwards, when Harry asks him why he did it, Nick tells him that he thinks Harry is his father. During the Cold War, the Soviets had attempted to suborn a British spy by having a woman agent seduce him. Harry denies being that man, but Nick does not believe him.

On the way back to Saint Petersburg, Harry explains to Nick that Alex planted the specifications for Alorex in his passport, but Harry was not fooled. He burns the valuable but deadly information and tips off both a rival gangster and the police about the incoming heroin shipment. Complications arise when there is an attempt on Harry's life by men working for Kim Soo, which Craig foils. The American, it turns out, is working for the U.S. Drug Enforcement Administration. Harry and his friends emerge relatively unscathed from the chaotic final shootout.

== Cast ==
- Michael Caine as Harry Palmer
- Jason Connery as Nikolai Petrov
- Mia Sara as Natasha Gradskaya
- Michael Sarrazin as Craig Warner
- Michael Gambon as Alexei Alexeyevich
- Burt Kwouk as Kim Soo
- Sue Lloyd as Jean Courtney
- John Dunn-Hill as Louis
- Lev Prygunov as Colonel Gradsky
- Gregory Hlady as Police Captain
- Patrick Allen as Colonel Wilson
- Anatoli Davydov as Yuri Stephanovich
