= Raymond Hawkey =

English graphic designer and author

Raymond John Hawkey (2 February 1930 – 22 August 2010) was an English graphic designer and author, based in London.

== Personal life ==
He was born in 1930 in Plymouth to John Charles Hawkey of Delabole, Cornwall, England (Royal Field Artillery, WW1) and Constance Olive (née Steckhahn) Hawkey.

== Professional education ==
Hawkey achieved a National Diploma in Design at the (then) Plymouth School of Art and was awarded a scholarship in 1950 to study at the Royal College of Art where he became a notable art director of the RCA's ARK magazine (now known as ARC), where he allegedly "outraged the rector Robin Darwin by introducing illustration and photography to ARK's covers".

He was one of the founders of the Association of Graphic Designers in 1959

== Newspaper design ==
While an RCA student Hawkey helped the picture editor of the Sunday Graphic and won a design talent competition organised by Vogue magazine. He was recruited by Vogue's publishers Condé Nast where he worked for "three happy years."

In 1959 he became design director of the Daily Express where he and Michael Rand revitalised the use of illustration as a key adjunct to stories. Design Journal said "their countdown description of a passenger plane ditching in mid-Atlantic is still [1970] fresh and moving; since there were, understandably, no cameramen at the scene of the crash, none of the other newspapers illustrated what it was like for the passengers" and that "[they] ... set a style which is still [1974] recognisable as the root of the best current work".

Hawkey was appointed presentation director of The Observer in 1964 and led the design of its colour magazine. In July 1986 he was co-designer (with Tony Mullins) of the first dummy of The Independent, but it is not clear how much of his contribution survived the painful cycles of redesign before the launch

== Other graphic design ==
Hawkey's 1st edition cover for The IPCRESS File (1962)

During his time at the Royal College of Art Hawkey first encountered Len Deighton when Deighton (another RCA scholarship student at that time) gatecrashed a literary party that Hawkey was helping to organise. Instead of ejecting the intruder, Hawkey found much in common with him and they became "lifelong friends".

In 1962, Hawkey was Deighton's choice to design the cover of his first novel The IPCRESS File, which some regard as the template for the covers of all subsequent airport novels. He went on to design covers for Deighton's books, including Horse Under Water, Funeral in Berlin and The Action Cookbook (where the IPCRESS revolver reappears, this time with a sprig of parsley in the barrel).

Hawkey designed covers for works by many other authors, including the Pan paperback editions of James Bond published from 1963 to 1969, which the Financial Times described as having "a stark elegance... consistently menacing and memorable. Each has a single photographic image on a plain or textured background. Blurb is dispensed with. It's the visual equivalent of a cruel, sardonic smile." A key element was Hawkey's bold use of lettering- the sans-serif James Bond wording is far larger than the book title or the author's name.

Hawkey's photo-realistic cover style is seen in his title sequence for the 1969 film Oh! What a Lovely War. for which Len Deighton was screenwriter and an (uncredited) producer.

== Books by Raymond Hawkey ==
Hawkey wrote four thrillers:

- Wild Card (with Roger Bingham) (1974)
- Side-Effect (1979)
- it (1983)
- End Stage (1988)

Hawkey also wrote and co-designed a 3D animated pop-up book Evolution: The Story of the Origins of Humankind, published by Putnam in 1987.
