= The IPCRESS File =

Spy novel

- First edition cover
- Author: Len Deighton
- Cover artist: Raymond Hawkey
- Language: English
- Publisher: Hodder & Stoughton
- Publication date: 1962 (first edition)
- Publication place: United Kingdom
- Media type: Print
- Followed by: Horse Under Water

The IPCRESS File is Len Deighton's first spy novel, published in 1962. The story involves Cold War brainwashing and includes scenes in Lebanon and on an atoll for a United States atomic weapon test, as well as information about Joe One, the Soviet Union's first atomic bomb. The story was made into a 1965 film and a 2022 TV series.

== Plot ==
The novel takes the form of the unnamed protagonist's personal report to the Minister of Defence, thus becoming the 'IPCRESS File' of the title. Events begin soon after the protagonist's transfer from military intelligence to WOOC(P), a small civilian intelligence agency reporting directly to the British Cabinet, where he works under the command of a man named Dalby. An intelligence broker code-named "Jay" is suspected to be behind a series of kidnappings of British VIPs with the intention of selling them to the Soviets, and the protagonist is assigned to meet Jay to secure the release of "Raven", a high-ranking scientist. While trying to meet Jay at a Soho strip club to negotiate Raven's release, the protagonist discovers Raven's unconscious body in a back room, but is unsuccessful in trying to rescue him.

WOOC(P) learns that Raven is to be transferred to the Soviets in Beirut, and a rescue mission is organised. The protagonist is assigned as a lookout and kills the occupants of a car that suddenly arrives on the scene, believing them to be operatives working for Jay; they instead turn out to be members of the U.S. Office of Naval Intelligence. The operation is otherwise a success and Raven is recovered, but investigation into Jay continues. A break appears when Housemartin, one of Jay's high-ranking operatives, is arrested in Shoreditch, but the protagonist and another operative arrive at the police station only to discover that Housemartin has been murdered in his cell. Information from the arrest enables WOOC(P) and the police to storm one of Jay's safe-houses, but it has been abandoned.

A military statistician, Carswell, and his assistant Murray, are assigned to WOOC(P) to attempt to find a statistical link between the disappearances of the scientists and to help with the administration of the department, while the protagonist is assigned an assistant, Jean Tonnesen, a beautiful young woman towards whom he begins to develop romantic feelings.

Dalby reveals intelligence suggesting that Jay's operations will interfere with an American neutron bomb test in the Pacific. He, Jean and the protagonist are sent to the test site as British observers and while there the protagonist learns from an old friend in the Central Intelligence Agency that the Americans suspect him of being a double agent due to the deaths of the American operatives. Jean reveals that Dalby has been visiting an abandoned Japanese bunker on the island and while following Dalby to the scene the protagonist is present when the site is sabotaged, setting back the bomb test and killing a military police officer. The protagonist is arrested by the Americans and interrogated, before apparently being transferred to Hungary on suspicion of being a Soviet agent. There he is drugged and subjected to psychological and physical torture, and nearly cracks before eventually managing to escape—only to discover that he is in fact in London. The protagonist takes refuge with Charlie Cavendish, the father of a friend killed during the Second World War, and attempts to re-establish contact with WOOC(P) without being arrested. Cavendish is killed by Jay's operatives, forcing the protagonist on the run; he approaches Dalby at his home, but discovers Dalby with Jay, Murray and another of Jay's operatives—confirming the protagonist's suspicions that Dalby is in fact the traitor.

The protagonist is discovered by Murray, who turns out to be an undercover operative from military intelligence also investigating Dalby. The protagonist escapes, but is captured and taken to meet Jay—he has, however, allowed military intelligence to follow them, and Jay and Dalby are arrested by Colonel Ross. The protagonist reveals to Jean that Jay and Dalby were using a process called "Induction of Psycho-neuroses by Conditioned REflex with StresS" (IPCRESS) to brainwash the VIPs into loyalty to the Soviet Union. The links that Carswell had discovered were in fact indicators of the personality traits that Jay had used to determine which VIPs would easily succumb to the process. Colonel Ross's earlier attempt to sell information to the protagonist had been a test of his loyalty. The novel ends with the protagonist concluding his report to the Minister, revealing that Jay has turned and begun working for the British, while Dalby has ostensibly died in a car accident.

== Background ==
Deighton wrote in 1966, "I was earning enough money as an artist to write anything I chose. I chose a spy novel":

I liked to have a problem or enigma that could follow the action of the book, but I wanted the book to be ragged and untidy, as life is. I wanted the characterization and the dialog to control the enigma, rather than the other way around as had been the case with the detective novels of the Thirties, which had become puzzles rather than stories. Above all, I was interested in the permutations of deceit and mistake.
Too many people in the fiction I had read told the whole truth all the time and never seemed to make a mistake of judgment. I decided to write a first-person narrative in which the narrator would lie to anyone if it would suit his purpose[, and] chose a secret-agent format so that I could use the political background that interested me.

"It owed a debt to Chandler, but was inspired by Beat the Devil, an old Bogart-Lorre film", Deighton added. In 1992 he said that the inspiration to write the novel came from his real-life neighbour Anna Wolkoff, a White Russian émigrée who collaborated with a cipher clerk from the American embassy to spy for Germany in World War II. Deighton's mother cooked for Wolkoff's dinner parties and he said that he "vividly" remembered when MI5 officers came to arrest her: "The experience was a major factor in my decision to write a spy story at my first attempt at fiction." The plot involves mind control, the acronym IPCRESS of the title standing for "Induction of Psycho-neuroses by Conditioned Reflex under Stress". The brainwashing is similar to a shock technique called psychic driving pioneered by Donald Ewen Cameron in the 1950s, originally on unwitting mental hospital patients, which was used and funded by the Central Intelligence Agency's secret MKULTRA program in Canada.

== Novel ==
Deighton's protagonist is unnamed, and this is maintained through all the sequels. Early in the novel we learn that he worked for Military Intelligence for three years before joining his present agency – WOOC(P) – as a civilian employee. WOOC(P) is described as "one of the smallest and most important of the Intelligence Units". It is never stated exactly what the initials stand for, although his previous boss refers to it as "Provisional".

We also learn in passing that he is from Burnley, Lancashire, and that he was born in 1922 or 1923.

WOOC(P) is a small department and the unnamed protagonist has a great deal of autonomy. He is resourceful and prepared for any eventuality, keeping an "escape package" containing money, a false passport and other documents circulating in the mail; he picks up the package from an accommodation address at a seedy London shop, and re-mails it to that address in a fresh envelope. He is also a gourmet who enjoys good food. Cooking features frequently in both the film and the novel; Deighton himself is an accomplished cook.

In common with several of his other early novels, the chapter headings have a "feature". In The IPCRESS File these take the form of each chapter being headed with a quote from a horoscope, which relates to the action in the chapter, though vaguely, as in most horoscopes.

The front cover, by Deighton's friend Raymond Hawkey, has been described as "the template for the covers of all subsequent airport novels".

== Film ==
A film adaptation starring Michael Caine was released in 1965 and produced by the James Bond co-producer Harry Saltzman, assisted by several prominent members of the Bond production family. The film medium made it difficult to maintain the anonymity of Deighton's hero, who acquired the name Harry Palmer.

The character's name was chosen by Caine, who was having lunch with Harry Saltzman. They were trying to think of a name for the protagonist, and agreed that a boring name would best suit the protagonist's persona. Saltzman asked what would be the most boring name they could think of and Caine suggested the name Harry, then immediately apologised to Saltzman. However, Saltzman saw the funny side and pointed out that his real first name was actually Herschel, not Harry, so Saltzman was satisfied with it. The inspiration for the surname came from a boy called Palmer whom Caine knew at school. Caine described Palmer as: "the most boring boy I'd ever met".

The given name "Harry" actually occurs in a short sequence in the book where the unnamed protagonist is greeted by someone saying "Hello, Harry." This causes him to think, "Now my name isn't Harry, but in this business it's hard to remember whether it ever had been."

== TV series ==
A television adaptation of the same name, directed by James Watkins and starring Joe Cole as Palmer, premiered on ITV on 6 March 2022.
