= The Ipcress File (TV series) =

2022 British spy thriller television series

- Genre: Spy thriller
- Based on: The IPCRESS File by Len Deighton
- Written by: John Hodge
- Directed by: James Watkins
- Starring: Joe Cole; Lucy Boynton; Tom Hollander
- Composer: Tom Hodge
- Country of origin: United Kingdom
- Original language: English
- No. of episodes: 6

Production
- Executive producers: Will Clarke; Alexander Deighton; Andrew Eaton; John Hodge; Sanford Lieberson; Andy Mayson; Hilary Saltzman; Steven Saltzman; James Watkins
- Producer: Paul Ritchie
- Production companies: Altitude Television; ITV Studios

Original release
- Network: ITV
- Release: 6 March – 10 April 2022

The Ipcress File is a British six-part cold war spy thriller based on the 1962 novel of the same name by Len Deighton. Written by John Hodge and directed by James Watkins, it stars Joe Cole, Lucy Boynton and Tom Hollander.

The Ipcress File was first broadcast at 9pm from Sunday 6 March to 10 April 2022 on ITV. The entire series was available for streaming, with commercials, on ITV Hub after episode 1 was broadcast. Within a week, the full series was also available, commercial-free, on BritBox in the United Kingdom.

== Premise ==
In 1963, spy chief Major Dalby gives small-time crook and black-marketeer Corporal Harry Palmer a way out of Military Prison at Colchester Garrison by offering him a job as an intelligence officer in his small but influential Whitehall security unit, WOOC(P).

The unit's investigation into a missing British nuclear scientist expands into a case of international espionage which is documented in the contents of the eponymous "IPCRESS File".

WOOC(P) is a (fictional) civilian department of the British intelligence community, reporting directly to the Cabinet. In the novel it is described as "one of the smallest and most important of the intelligence units" but it is never stated exactly what the initials stand for, only that it is "provisional". In episode one of the series, Dalby states that the unit is called ‘War Office Operational Communications (Provisional)’ and enjoys the fact that both MI5 and MI6 are envious of it.

== Cast ==
- Joe Cole as Harry Palmer, a WOOC(P) intelligence officer.
- Lucy Boynton as Jean Courtney, a WOOC(P) intelligence officer.
- Tom Hollander as Major Dalby, director of WOOC(P).
- Joshua James as Philip "Chico" Chillcott-Oakes, a WOOC(P) intelligence officer.
- Anastasia Hille as Alice, a WOOC(P) intelligence officer.
- Ashley Thomas as Paul Maddox, a CIA intelligence officer.
- David Dencik as Colonel Gregor Stok, a senior Soviet intelligence officer.
- Tom Vaughan-Lawlor as General Cathcart, a senior US military commander.
- Paul Higgins as Douglas Campbell MP, Minister of Defence at the pre-1964 Ministry of Defence (MoD).
- Matthew Steer as Professor Dawson, British nuclear physicist.
- Tamla Kari as Deborah, Palmer's ex-wife.
- Anna Geislerová as Dr Polina Lavotchkin, Russian physicist and defector to the West.
- Corey Johnson as Capt. Skip Henderson, US military.
- Mark Quartley as Pete, Deborah's new husband.
- Chris Lew Kum Hoi as Lin Hai.
- Nora-Jane Noone as Dr Karen Newton, an American psychiatrist.

== Production ==
ITV commissioned the series in December 2020. Filming on the series began in March 2021 in Liverpool, Wirral and Shrewsbury. Further locations in Croatia were used, including Zagreb (King Tomislav Square and the Archaeological Museum), Split, Rijeka and Opatija. The visual effects were done by the UK-based company Koala FX.

Contrary to previous adaptations, the story has been extensively reworked, with plot and some characters radically altered and a lot of new material added, making the TV series significantly different from Deighton's original. The series is also influenced by the 1965 film, most obviously by adopting the "Harry Palmer" and "Jean Courtney" character names coined for the film. Visually, director James Watkins makes several nods to the direction of Sidney J. Furie, with regular use of angled camera work, and in places borrows almost shot-for-shot the framing of certain scenes.

One of the most recognisable homages to the film is during the opening sequence in episode 1, featuring coffee grinding and coffee making, and the very first opening shot of Palmer's glasses. Watkins said "[It was a] little wink ... the gaze is out of focus and then it finds focus when he puts the glasses on." Writing in The Guardian Stuart Jeffries comments that "this opening reference to 57-year-old movie eyewear is a surprising gambit by director James Watkins and writer John Hodge, given their creative betrayal elsewhere of the source material."

== Episodes ==
No.	Title	Directed by	Written by	Original release date
1	"Episode 1"	James Watkins	John Hodge	6 March 2022
Nuclear scientist Professor Dawson is kidnapped. Harry Palmer is freed from military prison and co-opted by British intelligence for a dangerous mission in Berlin.
2	"Episode 2"	James Watkins	John Hodge	13 March 2022
Dawson was seeing an unconventional psychotherapist, a Russian agent is bugged and Jean's life is threatened.
3	"Episode 3"	James Watkins	John Hodge	20 March 2022
Harry and Jean travel to Beirut in pursuit of Professor Dawson. Who is holding him and when will he be exchanged?
4	"Episode 4"	James Watkins	John Hodge	27 March 2022
Harry and Jean witness a neutron bomb test and Dalby confronts General Cathcart, suspecting American involvement in Dawson's abduction.
5	"Episode 5"	James Watkins	John Hodge	3 April 2022
Dalby's integrity and judgement may be compromised and Harry explores his psychoneurosis.
6	"Episode 6"	James Watkins	John Hodge	10 April 2022
Harry is tormented and the enemy finally make their move, threatening the stability of the free world.

== Reception ==
Nick Hilton of The Independent gave the first episode four out of five stars, praising its "vintage" approach to spy thrillers.

Chris Bennion in The Telegraph laments that "Joe Cole is horribly miscast as Harry Palmer" but "the rest is terrific", calling this adaptation of Len Deighton's novel "atmospheric, cool and compelling".

The Spectator's James Walton praised the "impeccably twisty" production but said its main aim "is to be as cool and stylish as the 1960s films and TV it was paying tribute to" and that "everyone involved will continue to speak and act not like people in real life, so much as characters in cool and stylish spy films."

Writing in The Observer, Barbara Ellen gave The Ipcress File a cool review, writing that these types of show all hang on the leading man, stating that Joe Cole is "just too young looking, too choirboy-pretty" but goes on to write that "he's sneaking into the role like a cat through a side window. It's all in the cocky backchat, the crackles of masked intelligence, the wary glints; the acknowledgment that whatever else is going on in cold war Britain, for Palmer, surfing the class system is part of it."

"It would be a pretty good drama", said Anita Singh in The Daily Telegraph if it didn't have to live up to the 1965 film. "Gorgeous period stylings, an atmospheric production and assured direction all do justice” to the story, but it lacks "charm". Still, the costumes are "fabulous", the look of the show is "beautiful" and the story "motors along nicely", and Singh praises the production for sticking with Len Deighton's original creation and not trying to "turn Palmer into an action hero."

Writing in The New Statesman, Rachel Cooke asked "Why remake The Ipcress File?", writing that "despite there being so many good spy novels waiting to be adapted, ITV proved it has no imagination by commissioning a reworking of the classic." Cooke laments Joe Cole's "lack of charisma", writes that Lucy Boynton is "as woefully stiff as a Thunderbirds puppet", but praises Tom Hollander's performance as he "oozes patrician superiority". Cooke's piece concludes that "there's something more than a little ersatz about this series, as well as something quite boring."

Stuart Jeffries, writing in The Guardian, suggests that what makes The Ipcress File worth reviving is that "now, as then, the Etonian death grip on politics and public service imperils Britain more than any tooled-up Russian." He gave the first episode four out of five stars, praised Cole's performance and the preservation of the novel's "snarling class politics".

Writing in The Times about episode one, Carole Midgley asked if we need a remake of The Ipcress File and said Cole did a "restrained, nuanced job" but "it was always going to feel like watching the understudy standing in" and praised Tom Hollander as "the best thing in it", giving episode one three out of five stars. By episode two, Midgley admitted to enjoying the show "more than I expected" and being won over by Cole's "cocky insouciance and grounded humanity... making, dare I say it, the character more his own."

Also writing in The Times, Hugo Rifkind praised ITV's "cool and stylish" remake but found it a little too "cartoony and shallow". On the whole Rifkind enjoyed it writing that "It's Sunday night, it's ITV, and while the goodies might be a bit of a mess, at least the baddies are definitely bad. What more could you want?”.

Rachel Sigee writing in the i gave the first episode four out of five stars. She praised Joe Cole's "fine performance" but said it was "a little detached for an everyman hero." Sigee writes that "the show looked sensational" and "a spy drama centred around the Soviet nuclear threat couldn't be more relevant" but given Russia's current war in Ukraine, "it's a little hard to stomach."
