= Funeral in Berlin =

Book by Len Deighton

- First edition cover
- Author: Len Deighton
- Language: English
- Genre: Spy novel
- Publisher: Jonathan Cape
- Publication date: 1964
- Publication place: United Kingdom
- Media type: Print (Hardback & Paperback)
- Preceded by: Horse Under Water
- Followed by: Billion-Dollar Brain

Funeral in Berlin is a 1964 spy novel by Len Deighton set between Saturday 5 October and Sunday 10 November 1963. It was the third of Deighton's novels about an unnamed British agent. It was preceded by The IPCRESS File (1962) and Horse Under Water (1963), and followed by Billion-Dollar Brain (1966).

== Plot ==
The protagonist, who is unnamed, travels to Berlin to arrange the defection of a Soviet scientist named Semitsa, this being brokered by Johnny Vulkan of the Berlin intelligence community. Despite the protagonist's scepticism, the deal seems to have the support of Russian security-chief Colonel Stok and Hallam at the Home Office. The fake documentation for Semitsa needs to be precisely specified. An Israeli intelligence agent named Samantha Steel is involved in the case but it soon becomes apparent that behind the façade of an elaborate mock funeral lies a game of deadly manoeuvres and ruthless tactics.

== Legal dispute ==
The UK publication of Funeral in Berlin brought on a lawsuit: At the novel's climax, the protagonist and Hallam meet at a fireworks party where they discuss the hazards of fireworks. The dialogue went on to say the Home Office was hampered from taking action by vested interests, and mentioned Brock's Fireworks, a UK company, by name. Brock's objected to this, and sued for libel. The complaint was upheld, and the 1972 Penguin edition had the dialogue deleted. This ruling did not affect books published elsewhere, which continued to contain the offending material.

== Adaptation ==
A film version of Funeral in Berlin was made in 1966, starring Michael Caine and directed by Guy Hamilton. In 1973, the TV series Jason King (starring Peter Wyngarde), used the plot from Funeral in Berlin to smuggle an individual out of East Germany. The book is shown at the end of the episode. (Ostensibly, they had been using a plot from a book written by eponymous hero Jason King but it turns out at the end that it was a double bluff. King ostentatiously throws the Deighton book into the fireplace.)

== Chess references ==
Every chapter title is a quotation from the rules of chess.
