= Horse Under Water =

Book by Len Deighton

- First edition cover
- Author: Len Deighton
- Cover artist: Photography by Raymond Hawkey
- Language: English
- Genre: Spy novel
- Publisher: Jonathan Cape
- Publication date: 1963
- Publication place: United Kingdom
- Media type: Print (Hardback & Paperback)
- ISBN: 978-0-399-10419-0
- Preceded by: The IPCRESS File
- Followed by: Funeral in Berlin

Horse Under Water (1963) is the second of several Len Deighton spy novels featuring an unnamed British intelligence officer. It was preceded by The IPCRESS File and followed by Funeral in Berlin.

== Background ==
The novel is set mostly in a small fishing village in Portugal, during the António de Oliveira Salazar dictatorship. It retains the style of The IPCRESS File — multiple plot twists, Gauloises cigarettes, the grime- and soot-stained British winter. In common with several of Deighton's other early novels, the chapter headings have a running theme. In Horse Under Water these are crossword puzzle clues, reflecting the protagonist's habit of endlessly writing and replacing words in crossword puzzles. The first edition of Horse Under Water published by Jonathan Cape was shorter than the later Penguin edition, which included a detailed description of the anonymous British agent's diving course and also introduced characters later seen in the book, such as Chief Petty Officer Edwardes.

== Plot ==
The plot centres on retrieving items from a Type XXI U-boat sunk off the Portuguese coast in the last days of World War II. Initially, the items are forged British and American currency, for financing a revolution in Portugal on the cheap. Later, it switches to heroin (the "Horse" of the title), and eventually it is revealed that the true interest is in the "Weiss list" – a list of Britons prepared to help the Third Reich set up a puppet government in Britain, should Germany prevail. Thrown into the mix is secret "ice melting" technology, which could be vital to the missile submarines then beginning to hide under the Arctic sea ice.

== Technology ==
The secret weather buoys generally used by the wartime Kriegsmarine were not as sophisticated as the one described in the novel. They were not submersible and, at the end of their expected battery life of two months, they were supposed to self-destruct with an explosive charge. See also Weather Station Kurt.

== Film adaptation ==
A 1968 film adaptation of Horse Under Water was planned, but following the poor reception of Billion Dollar Brain it was abandoned.
