= Harry Saltzman =

Canadian theatre and film producer (1915–1994)

- Born: Herschel Saltzman; October 27, 1915; Sherbrooke, Quebec, Canada
- Died: September 28, 1994 (aged 78); Neuilly-sur-Seine, France
- Occupation: Film producer
- Years active: 1956–1994
- Known for: Production of the James Bond films
- Spouses: Tanya Morris; Jacqueline Colin; Adriana Ghinsberg
- Children: 4

Herschel "Harry" Saltzman (/ˈsɔːltsmən/; October 27, 1915 – September 28, 1994) was a Canadian theatre and film producer. He is best remembered for co-producing the first nine of the James Bond film series with Albert R. Broccoli. Apart from a ten-year stint living in St. Petersburg, Florida, he lived most of his life in Denham, Buckinghamshire, England.

== Early life ==
Saltzman was born in a hospital in Sherbrooke, Quebec, the son of Jewish immigrants Abraham Saltzman and Dora Horstein. His father was a horticulturalist and immigrated to the US in 1905 from Kozienice, Poland (then Congress Poland within the Russian Empire). His parents married in 1909. The couple moved to Canada in 1910 where their four oldest children (Minnie, Florence, Herschel and Isadore) were born. Saltzman was raised in Saint John, New Brunswick for the first seven years of his life. In 1922, the family moved to Cleveland, Ohio, where their youngest son, David, was born. He ran away from home at the age of 15. Saltzman was 30 when he learned where he had actually been born.

== Career ==
At about age 17, Saltzman joined a circus and travelled with them for some years.

In 1932, Saltzman moved to Paris to study political science and economics. However within a year, he was "hand-picking talent for 40 two-a-day vaudeville houses all over Europe." Saltzman claimed that he had worked as an assistant for French film director René Clair, who came to the United States in 1940 to make the film The Flame of New Orleans.

In 1942, Saltzman signed a booking contract with Fanchon & Marco Enterprises. Saltzman went to the West Coast to sign big picture names. Saltzman sought the Ritz Brothers, but due to film commitments, they could not sign. In 1943, Saltzman was managing The Gilbert Brothers' Combined Circus. According to an advert, the 1943 season began 26 May in Clifton, New Jersey, and was booked solid through the Eastern American states until mid-October.

Shortly after World War II began, he enlisted with the Royal Canadian Air Force in Vancouver. He received a medical discharge in Trenton, Ontario in 1943, and joined the U.S. Psychological Warfare Bureau, because he wanted to get back to Europe. Saltzman was initially stationed at the North African theatre in 1943 before being reassigned to London.

In 1945, Saltzman helped Lin Yutang establish UNESCO's film division, which was initially concerned with mediation in the Chinese Civil War between the Communist Party and the Kuomintang. He eventually quit due to "east-west differences" which to him seemed "so hopeless". Saltzman spent a year with the French government's Ministry of Reconstruction. At that point, he decided he wanted to return to show business.

After the war, in Paris, Saltzman became part of the writer Colette's entourage. He worked as a talent scout for European productions on stage, television and in film, but gradually became more successful producing stage plays. He moved to the United States in the 1950s. In the late 1950s, Saltzman and Rhea Fink formed the Mountie Enterprises Corporation, to operate coin-operated hobby horses. The first hobby horses appeared in department stores, on floors where children's goods are sold. By February 1951 Mountie Enterprises Corporation and Saltzman's new company Rider Amusement Corporation reported brisk business, as both companies got contracts to install coin-operated hobby horses in major department stores in numerous American cities. Saltzman claimed to earn US$35 a day per hobby horse.(equivalent to $413.30 in 2023)

He became production supervisor on Robert Montgomery Presents and produced Captain Gallant of the Foreign Legion.

He moved what was by then his family of four to the UK in the mid-1950s, where he again produced theatre. He entered the film business by producing The Iron Petticoat (1956), a play adaptation. Saltzman started Woodfall Film Productions with Tony Richardson and John Osborne, and produced other acclaimed social realism dramas such as 1959's Look Back in Anger and 1960's Saturday Night and Sunday Morning. Film director Anthony Mann noted the dichotomy in Saltzman's career: "Harry used to make great pictures; now he makes very successful ones. After all, you can't be an artist all your life." 1960, his film The Entertainer was named one of 1960's ten best films by The New York Times' film critics, and nominated for 5 Oscars. Laurence Olivier won the Oscar for Best Actor. It was also nominated for 3 Baftas.

In early 1961, excited by reading the James Bond novel Goldfinger, he made a bid to acquire the film rights to the character. Jacqueline Saltzman founded Danjaq, S.A. with Dana Broccoli and incorporated it on September 14, 1961. It was a holding company responsible for the copyright and trademarks of James Bond on screen, and the parent company of Eon Productions, which they also set up as a film production company for the Bond films. The name Danjaq is a combination of the names of Broccoli's third wife and Saltzman's second (Dana and Jacqueline, respectively).

In 1958, he had set up the production company Lowndes Productions, but he did not use it for film production until 1965, from which time he used it for eight productions, among them his three Harry Palmer films with Michael Caine: The Ipcress File (1965), Funeral in Berlin (1966) and Billion Dollar Brain (1967). The company's last production came out in 1988, and it was dissolved in 1992.

Saltzman produced other films between the James Bond and Harry Palmer productions. These include his World War II pet project Battle of Britain (1969), and Call Me Bwana (1963), one of only three films to be produced by Eon Productions outside of the James Bond franchise. Saltzman also attempted to make a film about Canadian Métis leader Cuthbert Grant.

In 1969, Saltzman borrowed 70 million Swiss francs (US$40,000,000) from the Union Bank of Switzerland. In 1970, Saltzman won control of the Technicolor Motion Picture Corporation from chairman Patrick Frawley in a proxy fight. However, by 1972 Saltzman sold off 370,500 shares of Technicolor stock for $7.6M to repay his loan from the Union Bank of Switzerland. Film Bulletin also claimed that some of Saltzman's former allies in the 1970 proxy had forced Saltzman to sell the stocks — which they purchased — and were seeking to oust him from the Technicolor board. Saltzman filed several lawsuits against Technicolor executive board members, claiming conspiracy "seeking to retain his positions in the firm." Screenwriter Tom Mankiewicz claims Technicolor was selling at $30 per share, when Saltzman took control of the company in 1970; it was selling at $8 a share by 1972, at the time Saltzman was ousted. At some point, Saltzman defaulted on the interest payments to the Swiss Bank.

According to a 1978 court decision, Saltzman and Broccoli had allegedly agreed to dissolve Danjaq, S.A. in 1972, but Broccoli later allegedly refused to honour the agreement. Saltzman unsuccessfully attempted to have the Swiss courts dissolve the company. By autumn that year, Saltzman's financial situation was desperate. In March 1974, the Los Angeles Times reported that Saltzman was attempting to sell Paramount Pictures his 50% share of the Bond film franchise. On April 24, 1978, Sir Patrick O'Connor of the British High Court ordered Saltzman to pay an American law firm £13,000 (US$28,000) plus £5,000 (US$10,500) in post-judgment interest and court costs. Saltzman had retained the firm to resolve his financial difficulties.

Saltzman's productions in the 1970s also proved problematic. A science fiction musical, Toomorrow starring Olivia Newton-John, was withdrawn from release and resulted in several lawsuits. Also in 1970, Saltzman cancelled a planned film, several weeks before shooting was to begin, about the dancer Vaslav Nijinsky, starring Rudolf Nureyev. Director Tony Richardson believed that Saltzman had overextended himself, and did not have the funds to make the film. Throughout the 1970s, Saltzman struggled to make a film of The Micronauts — a "shrunken man", which was a science fiction story to have starred Gregory Peck and Lee Remick — investing much money into the doomed project, that was finally shelved in the late 1970s. Due to numerous financial difficulties, Saltzman sold his 50% stake in Danjaq to United Artists Corporation in 1975. Subsequently, his health also declined and he became depressed.

In 1980, Saltzman purchased the theatrical production company H.M. Tennent Ltd., becoming its chairman.

Saltzman all but retired from the film business thereafter. He had long desired to produce a film on the life of Vaslav Nijinsky based on biographies the rights to which he had acquired in the 1960s. He has an executive producer credit on the film Nijinsky in 1980, and the 1988 British-Italian-Yugoslavian co-production Time of the Gypsies.

In 1992, Saltzman dissolved H.M. Tennant.

== Personal life ==
Saltzman was married three times and had four children, one with his first wife and three with his second.

He was briefly married in California. His first wife Tanya "helped in an amazing way to enlighten his work and contribution to the Supreme Headquarters Allied Expeditionary Force and in the U.S. secret service OSS," Hollywood Reporter noted. Saltzman's first child, Merry, was born in 1946. As a child, she played with the likes of Ian Fleming, Sean Connery, Ursula Andress, Michael Caine and Cary Grant. She died at her home in San Jose, California, on October 30, 2024, at the age of 77, following a brief battle with cancer.

Judith Krantz claims that she and Saltzman briefly dated. Krantz's father liked Saltzman and found him an entertaining conversationalist. Krantz claims that Saltzman proposed to her. She declined, saying that he was not her physical type, which she regretted because she thought he was "a wonderful companion, with a fantastic imagination."

After World War II, Saltzman was in Paris, where he met Jacqueline Colin, a refugee from Romania, whom he subsequently married. Harry and Jacqueline Saltzman had three children: Hilary, Steven and Christopher. Hilary and Christopher attended the private Shorecrest Preparatory School in St. Petersburg, Florida during the late 1970s and early 1980s.

In the early 1970s, Saltzman's wife Jacqueline was diagnosed with terminal cancer. In 1972, the Saltzmans relocated to St. Petersburg, Florida, where Jacqueline's sister lived. In March 1977, Saltzman sold his English country mansion and moved full-time to St. Petersburg. Jacqueline Saltzman died of cancer on January 31, 1980.

In 1982, Saltzman sold his 15-room Venetian Isles, St. Petersburg, Florida home, and moved back to London. His two oldest children with Jacqueline were out of school, and his youngest was studying in Switzerland. Saltzman subsequently married Adriana Ghinsberg.

He died of a heart attack on September 28, 1994, while visiting Paris.

== List of Saltzman's productions ==
- The Iron Petticoat, 1956
- Look Back in Anger, 1958
- Saturday Night and Sunday Morning, 1960
- The Entertainer, 1960
- Dr. No, 1962
- From Russia with Love, 1963
- Call Me Bwana, 1963
- Goldfinger, 1964
- The Ipcress File, 1965
- And There Came a Man, 1965
- Thunderball, 1965 (credited as Executive Producer)
- Chimes at Midnight, 1965
- Un monde nouveau (a.k.a. A New World), 1966 (credited as "presenter")
- Funeral in Berlin, 1966
- Shock Troops, 1967 (credited as "presenter")
- You Only Live Twice, 1967
- Israel: A Right to Live, 1967 (documentary)
- Billion Dollar Brain, 1967
- Play Dirty, 1969
- Battle of Britain, 1969
- On Her Majesty's Secret Service, 1969
- Toomorrow, 1970
- Diamonds Are Forever, 1971
- Days of Fury, 1973
- Live and Let Die, 1973
- The Man with the Golden Gun, 1974
- Nijinsky, 1980
- Time of the Gypsies, 1988

== Sources ==
- Broccoli, Albert R; Zec, Donald (1998). When the Snow Melts. London: Boxtree. ISBN 978-0-7522-1162-6.
- Brosnan, John (1978). Future Tense: The Cinema of Science Fiction. Macdonald and Jane's. ISBN 9780354042222.
- Krantz, Judith (2000). Sex and Shopping: The Confessions of a Nice Jewish Girl: An Autobiography. Farrar, Straus and Giroux. ISBN 9780312274177.
- Mankiewicz, Tom; Crane, Robert (2012). My Life as a Mankiewicz: An Insider's Journey through Hollywood. University Press of Kentucky. ISBN 9780813136059.
- Richardson, Tony (1993). The Long-Distance Runner: An Autobiography. William Morrow and Company. ISBN 9780688121013.
