= Joe Cole (actor) =

English actor (born 1988)

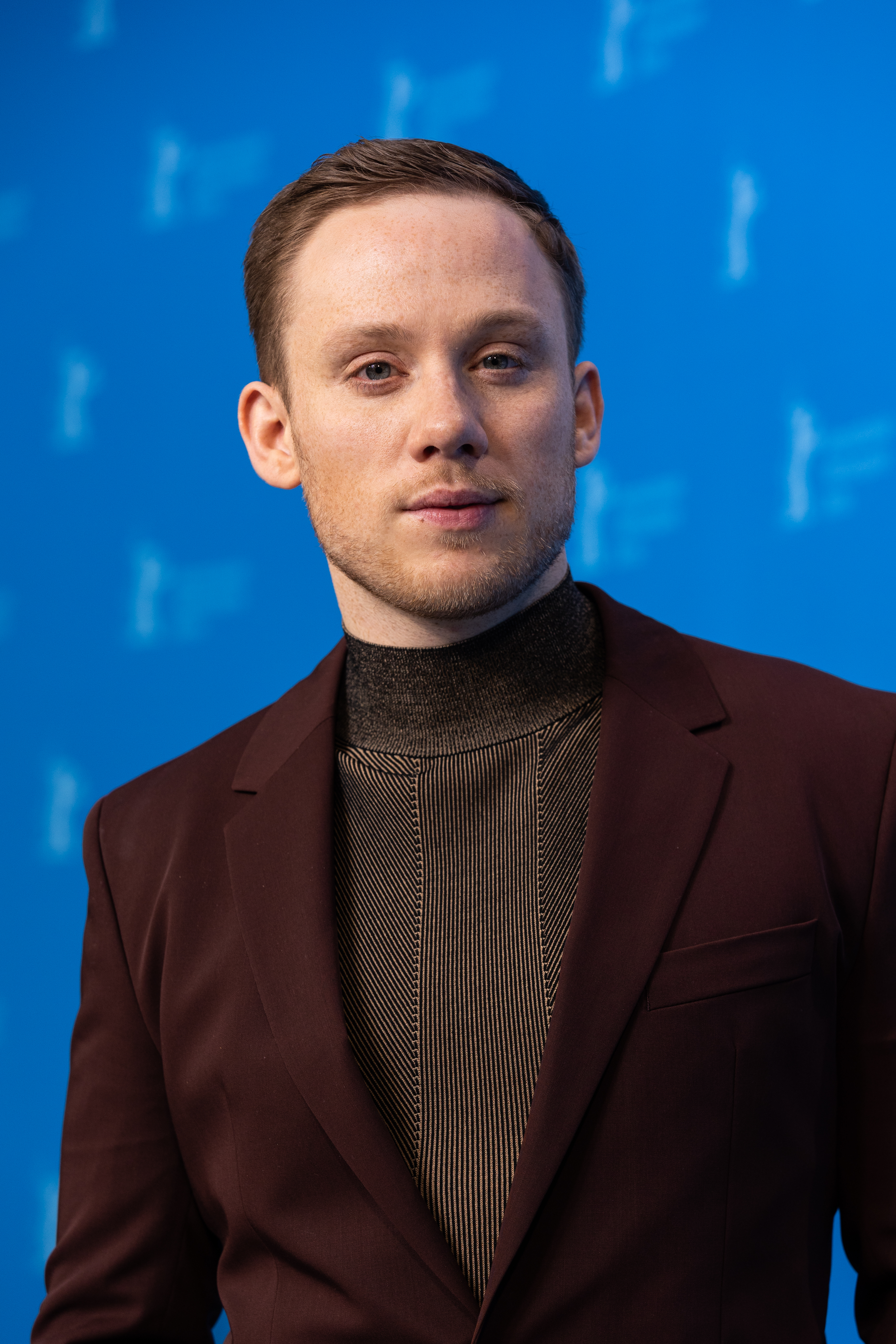
- Cole at the 72nd Berlin International Film Festival in 2022
- Born: Joseph Michael Cole; 28 November 1988 (age 37); Kingston upon Thames, London, England
- Education: National Youth Theatre
- Occupation: Actor
- Years active: 2010–present
- Relatives: Finn Cole (brother)

Joseph Michael Cole (born 28 November 1988) is an English actor. He gained prominence through his role in the BBC series Peaky Blinders (2014–2017) and received a British Academy Television Award nomination for his performance in the Black Mirror episode "Hang the DJ" (2017). He has since starred in the Channel 4 series Pure (2019), the Sky Atlantic series Gangs of London (2020–2025), the ITV series The Ipcress File (2022) and the BBC series Nightsleeper (2024).

Cole won a British Independent Film Award for his performance in A Prayer Before Dawn (2017). His other films include Secret in Their Eyes (2015) and Against the Ice (2022).

== Early life and education ==
The oldest of five boys, Joe Cole was born 28 November 1988 and grew up in Kingston upon Thames in London. His younger brother is actor Finn Cole, who starred alongside him in Peaky Blinders.

He attended Hollyfield Secondary School in Surbiton.

== Career ==
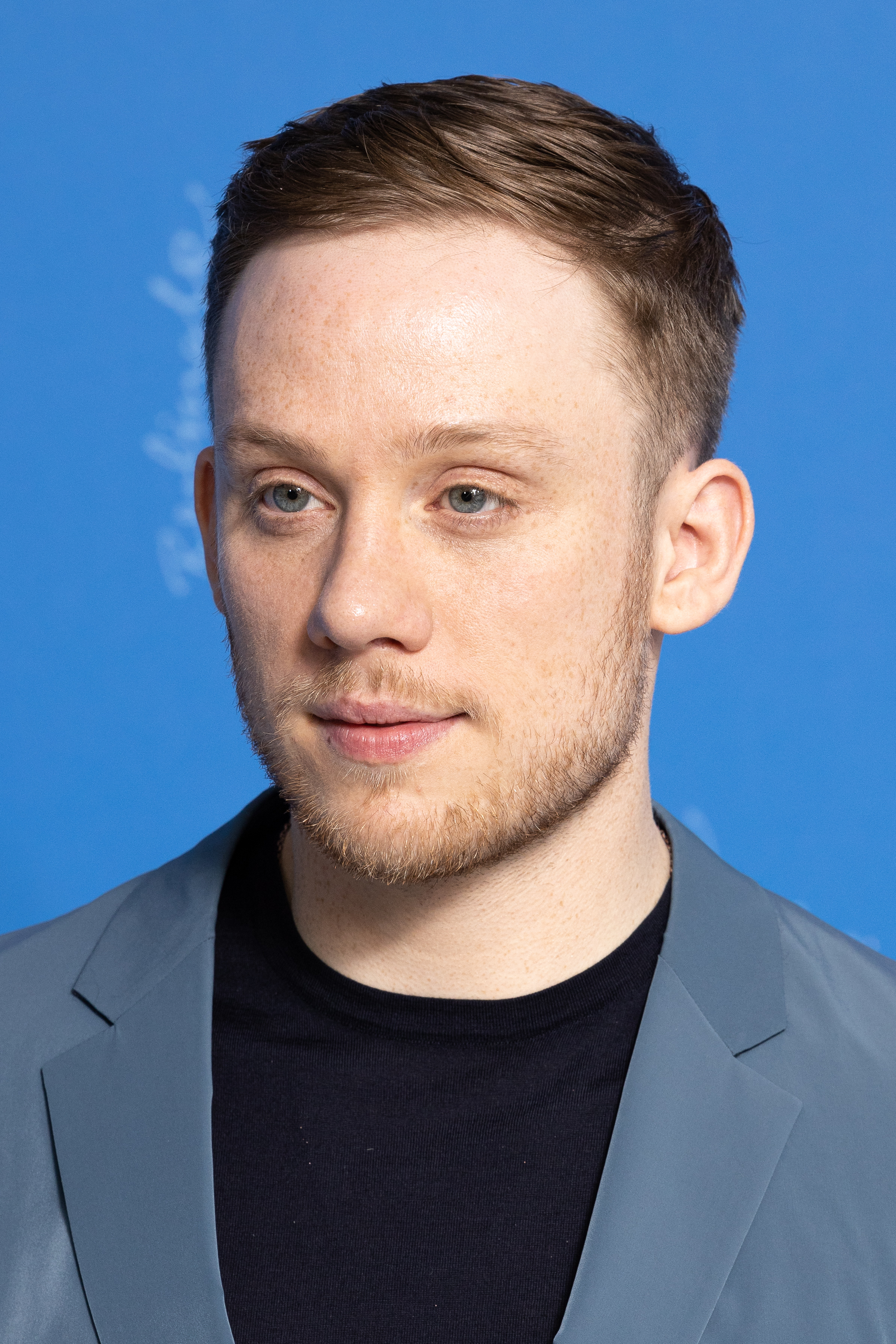
Cole at the 70th Berlin International Film Festival in 2020

Cole's acting career began when he was accepted into the National Youth Theatre. He obtained his first roles in a one-night show in the West End, on The Bill and Holby City, and then in roles on stage at the Bush Theatre's sell-out School Season. In the 2010s, he wrote a comedy series with Matt Lucas.

From 2013 to 2017, Cole starred as John Shelby in the historical crime drama Peaky Blinders. In 2017, he starred in a season 4 episode of Charlie Brooker's Black Mirror, earning a BAFTA nomination for Best Actor.

For his role as Billy Moore in A Prayer Before Dawn, Cole won Best Actor at the 2018 British Independent Film Awards.

== Filmography ==
Key
†	Denotes projects that have not yet been released

=== Film ===
Year	Title	Role	Notes
2010	Assessment	Michael	Short film
2012	Volume	Sam	Short film
2012	Offender	Tommy	
2012	Now Is Good	Scott	
2014	A Long Way Down	Chas	
2014	Slap	Connor	Short film
2014	The Falling	Kenneth Lamont	
2014	Peterman	Johnny	
2014	Callow & Sons		Short film
2015	Green Room	Reece	
2015	Pressure	Jones	
2015	Secret in Their Eyes	Marzin / Beckwith	
2017	Eye on Juliet	Gordon	Tiantan Award for Best Actor
2017	Woodshock	Nick	
2017	Thank You for Your Service	Billy Waller	
2018	A Prayer Before Dawn	Billy Moore	British Independent Film Award for Best Actor
2019	Happy New Year, Colin Burstead	Ed	
2020	One of These Days	Kyle Parson	
2022	Against the Ice	Iver Iversen	
2024	The Damned	Daniel	
2025	The Actor	Nick	
2025	The Birthday Party	Ian Forster	
2026	He Bled Neon	Ethan	
2026	I See Buildings Fall Like Lightning	Rian	
TBA	The Queen of Fashion †	Alexander McQueen	Post-production
TBA	Subversion †	TBA	Post-production
TBA	Untitled Mike Thornton biopic film †	TBA	Filming

=== Television ===
Year	Title	Role	Notes
2010	The Bill	Leo Cooper	1 episode
2010	Holby City	Shaun Jackson	2 episodes
2010	Stanley Park	Lee	Television film
2011	Come Fly with Me	Jordan	2 episodes
2011	Injustice	Alan Stewart	4 episodes
2012	Skins	Luke	2 episodes
2012	The Thick of It	Jack	1 episode
2012	The Hour	Trevor	3 episodes
2013	Playhouse Presents	Stephen	1 episode
2013–2017	Peaky Blinders	John Shelby	Main role, 20 episodes
2017	Black Mirror	Frank	Episode: "Hang the DJ"; Nominated – BAFTA TV Award for Best Leading Actor
2019	Pure	Charlie	Main role, 6 episodes
2020–2025	Gangs of London	Sean Wallace	Main role, 16 episodes
2022	The Ipcress File	Harry Palmer	Miniseries, 6 episodes
2023	A Small Light	Jan Gies	Miniseries, 8 episodes
2024	Nightsleeper	Joe Roag	BBC Miniseries, 6 episodes
2026	I am Helen	Steve	Channel 4 miniseries
