= James Watkins (director) =

English filmmaker (born 1973)

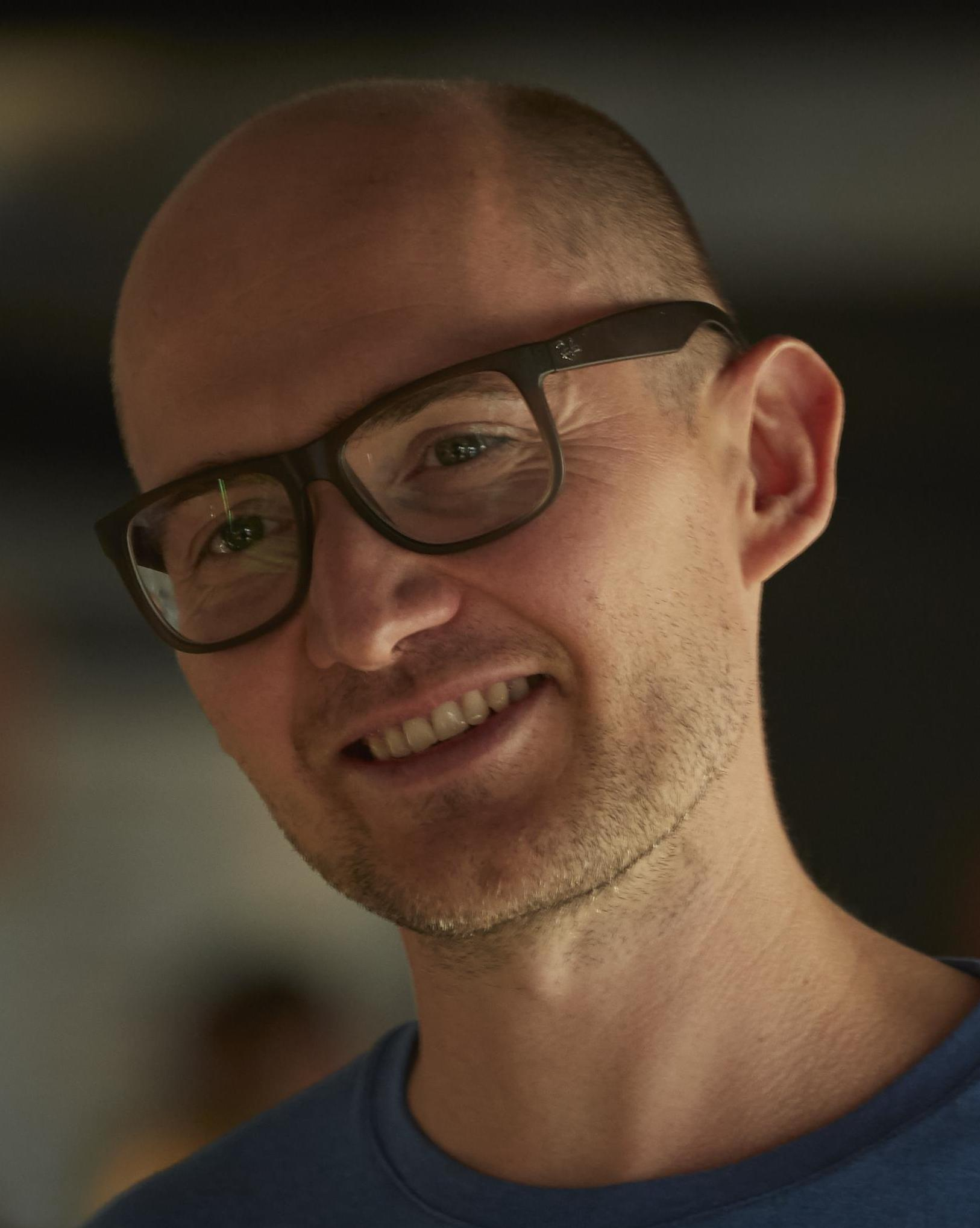
- Watkins in 2017
- Born: James Thomas Watkins; 20 May 1973 (age 53); Nottingham, England
- Occupation: Filmmaker

James Thomas Watkins (born 20 May 1973) is an English filmmaker. He is best known for horror films such as Eden Lake (2008), The Woman in Black (2012), and Speak No Evil (2024). He has also directed episodes of series such as Black Mirror (2016) and The Ipcress File (2022), and was the creator, writer, director, and executive producer of the series McMafia (2018). He directed the DC Universe film Clayface which was released in 2026.

== Early life ==
Watkins was born in Nottingham on 20 May 1973.

== Career ==
=== Film ===
Watkins co-wrote the horror films My Little Eye (2002) and Gone (2007). In his directorial debut, he wrote and directed the horror-thriller film Eden Lake (2008).

It won Best Horror Film at the 2009 Empire Awards, the Special Jury Prize at the Sitges Film Festival, and Best Director at Fantasporto. Watkins was also nominated for the Douglas Hickox Award at the 2008 British Independent Film Awards.

Watkins was the co-writer and second unit director of The Descent Part 2 (2009). He directed the horror film The Woman in Black (2012) and co-wrote and directed the action thriller film Bastille Day (2016). He wrote and directed the horror-thriller film Speak No Evil (2024). Before moving into directing, Watkins had a first-look writing deal with Working Title Films from 2001 to 2007, under which he wrote several screenplays, including My Little Eye. He has also written screenplays for Warner Bros., Pathé, Film4 and BBC Films.

Watkins directed the DC Universe (DC) supervillain horror film Clayface (2026).

=== Television ===
Watkins directed the Black Mirror episode "Shut Up and Dance" (2016). He directed all six episodes of The Ipcress File (2022) and served as an executive producer. He co-created and co-wrote McMafia (2018) with Hossein Amini and directed all eight episodes.

== Filmography ==
=== Film ===
Year	Title	Director	Writer
2002	My Little Eye	No	Yes
2007	Gone	No	Yes
2008	Eden Lake	Yes	Yes
2009	The Descent Part 2	2nd unit	Yes
2012	The Woman in Black	Yes	No
2016	Bastille Day	Yes	Yes
2024	Speak No Evil	Yes	Yes
2026	Clayface	Yes	No

=== Television ===
Year	Title	Director	Writer	Creator	Executive Producer	Notes
2016	Black Mirror	Yes	No	No	No	Episode: "Shut Up and Dance"
2018	McMafia	Yes	Yes	Yes	Yes	8 episodes
2022	The Ipcress File	Yes	No	No	Yes	6 episodes
