= Detective fiction =

Subgenre of crime and mystery fiction

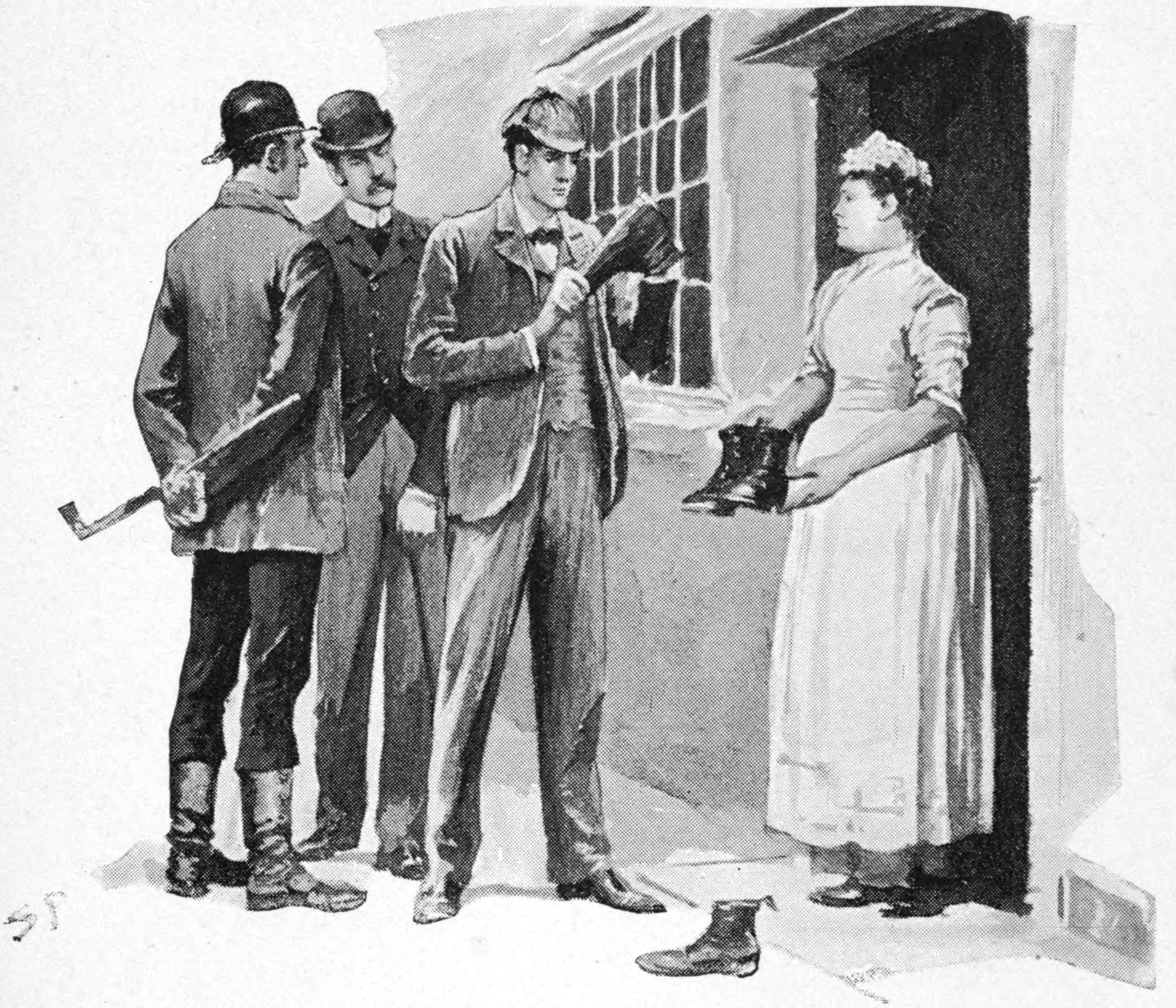
Consulting detective Sherlock Holmes examines a suspect's boots in an illustration to the 1891 story "The Boscombe Valley Mystery"

Detective fiction is a subtype of crime fiction and mystery fiction in which an investigator or a detective—whether professional, amateur or retired—investigates a crime, often murder. The detective genre began around the same time as speculative fiction and other genre fiction in the mid-nineteenth century and has remained extremely popular, particularly in novels. Some of the most famous heroes of detective fiction include C. Auguste Dupin, Sherlock Holmes, Kogoro Akechi, Miss Marple and Hercule Poirot. Juvenile stories featuring The Hardy Boys, Nancy Drew, and The Boxcar Children have also remained in print for several decades.

== History ==
=== Ancient ===
Some scholars, such as R. H. Pfeiffer, have suggested that certain ancient and religious texts bear similarities to what would later be called detective fiction. In the Old Testament story of Susanna and the Elders (the Protestant Bible locates this story within the apocrypha), the account told by two witnesses breaks down when Daniel cross-examines them. In response, author Julian Symons has argued that "those who search for fragments of detection in the Bible and Herodotus are looking only for puzzles" and that these puzzles are not detective stories.

=== Early Arabic ===
One Thousand and One Nights contains several of the earliest detective stories, anticipating modern detective fiction. The oldest known example of a detective story is "The Three Apples", one of the tales narrated by Scheherazade in the One Thousand and One Nights (Arabian Nights). In this story, a fisherman discovers a heavy, locked chest along the Tigris river, which he then sells to the Abbasid Caliph, Harun al-Rashid. When Harun breaks open the chest, he discovers the body of a young woman who has been cut into pieces. Harun then orders his vizier, Ja'far ibn Yahya, to solve the crime and to find the murderer within three days, or be executed if he fails in his assignment. Suspense is generated through multiple plot twists that occur as the story progresses. With these characteristics this may be considered an archetype for detective fiction. It anticipates the use of reverse chronology in modern detective fiction, where the story begins with a crime before presenting a gradual reconstruction of the past.

The main difference between Ja'far ("The Three Apples") and later fictional detectives, such as Sherlock Holmes and Hercule Poirot, is that Ja'far has no desire to solve the case. The whodunit mystery is solved when the murderer himself confesses his crime. This in turn leads to another assignment in which Ja'far has to find the culprit who instigated the murder within three days or else be executed. Ja'far again fails to find the culprit before the deadline, but owing to chance, he discovers a key item. In the end, he manages to solve the case through reasoning in order to prevent his own execution.

On the other hand, two other Arabian Nights stories, "The Merchant and the Thief" and "Ali Khwaja", contain two of the earliest fictional detectives, who uncover clues and present evidence to catch or convict a criminal known to the audience, with the story unfolding in normal chronology and the criminal already known to the audience. The latter involves a climax where the titular detective protagonist Ali Khwaja presents evidence from expert witnesses in a court.

=== Early Chinese ===
Gong'an fiction (公案小说, literally："case records of a public law court") is an early genre of Chinese detective fiction.

Some well-known stories include the Yuan dynasty story Circle of Chalk (Chinese: 灰闌記), the Ming dynasty story collection Bao Gong An (Chinese: 包公案) and the 18th century Di Gong An (Chinese: 狄公案) story collection. The latter was translated into English as Celebrated Cases of Judge Dee by Dutch sinologist Robert Van Gulik, who then used the style and characters to write the original Judge Dee series.

The hero/detective of these novels was typically a traditional judge or similar official based on historical personages such as Judge Bao (Bao Qingtian) or Judge Dee (Di Renjie). Although the historical characters may have lived in an earlier period (such as the Song or Tang dynasty) most stories are written in the later Ming or Qing dynasty period.

These novels differ from the Western tradition in several points as described by Van Gulik:

- The detective is the local magistrate who is usually involved in several unrelated cases simultaneously;
- The criminal is introduced at the very beginning of the story and his crime and reasons are carefully explained, thus constituting an inverted detective story rather than a "puzzle";
- The stories have a supernatural element with ghosts telling people about their death and even accusing the criminal;
- The stories are filled with digressions into philosophy, the complete texts of official documents, and much more, resulting in long books; and
- The novels tend to have a huge cast of characters, typically in the hundreds, all described with their relation to the various main actors in the story.

Van Gulik chose Di Gong An to translate because in his view it was closer to the Western literary style and more likely to appeal to non-Chinese readers.

A number of Gong An works may have been lost or destroyed during the Literary Inquisitions and the wars in ancient China. In traditional Chinese culture, this genre was not prestigious, and was therefore considered less worthy of preservation than works of philosophy or poetry.

=== Early Western ===
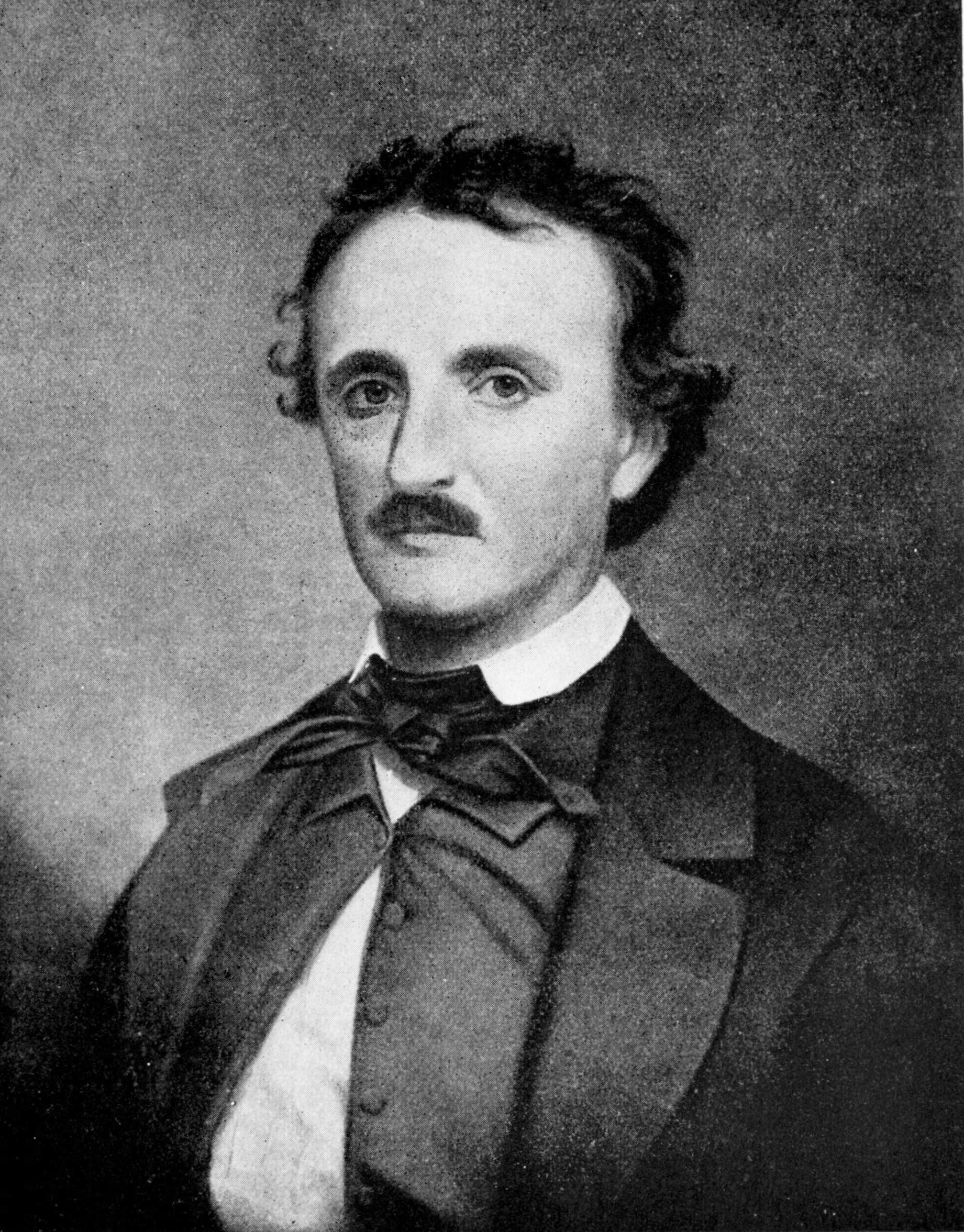
Edgar Allan Poe (1809–1849)

One of the earliest examples of detective fiction in Western literature is Voltaire's Zadig (1748), which features a main character who performs feats of analysis. Things as They Are; or, The Adventures of Caleb Williams (1794) by William Godwin portrays the law as protecting the murderer and destroying the innocent. Thomas Skinner Sturr's anonymous Richmond, or stories in the life of a Bow Street officer was published in London in 1827; the Danish crime story The Rector of Veilbye by Steen Steensen Blicher was written in 1829; and the Norwegian crime novel Mordet paa Maskinbygger Roolfsen ("The Murder of Engine Maker Roolfsen") by Maurits Hansen was published in December 1839.

"Das Fräulein von Scuderi" is an 1819 short story by E. T. A. Hoffmann, in which Mlle de Scudery establishes the innocence of the police's favorite suspect in the murder of a jeweller. This story is sometimes cited as the first detective story and as a direct influence on Edgar Allan Poe's "The Murders in the Rue Morgue" (1841). Also suggested as a possible influence on Poe is 'The Secret Cell', a short story published in September 1837 by William Evans Burton. It has been suggested that this story may have been known to Poe, who worked for Burton in 1839. The story was about a London policeman who solves the mystery of a kidnapped girl. Burton's fictional detective relied on practical methods such as dogged legwork, knowledge of the underworld and undercover surveillance, rather than brilliance of imagination or intellect.

=== English genre establishment ===
Detective fiction in the English-language literature is considered to have begun in 1841 with the publication of Poe's "The Murders in the Rue Morgue", featuring "the first fictional detective, the eccentric and brilliant C. Auguste Dupin". When the character first appeared, the word detective had not yet been used in English; however, the character's name, "Dupin", originated from the English word dupe or deception. Poe devised a "plot formula that's been successful ever since, give or take a few shifting variables." Poe followed with further Auguste Dupin tales: "The Mystery of Marie Rogêt" in 1842 and "The Purloined Letter" in 1844.

Poe referred to his stories as "tales of ratiocination". In stories such as these, the primary concern of the plot is ascertaining truth, and the usual means of obtaining the truth is a complex and mysterious process combining intuitive logic, astute observation, and perspicacious inference. "Early detective stories tended to follow an investigating protagonist from the first scene to the last, making the unravelling a practical rather than emotional matter." "The Mystery of Marie Rogêt" is particularly interesting because it is a barely fictionalized account based on Poe's theory of what happened to the real-life Mary Cecilia Rogers.

William Russell (1806–1876) was among the first English authors to write fictitious 'police memoirs', contributing an irregular series of stories (under the pseudonym 'Waters') to Chambers's Edinburgh Journal between 1849 and 1852. Unauthorised collections of his stories were published in New York City in 1852 and 1853, entitled The Recollections of a Policeman. Twelve stories were then collated into a volume entitled Recollections of a Detective Police-Officer, published in London in 1856.

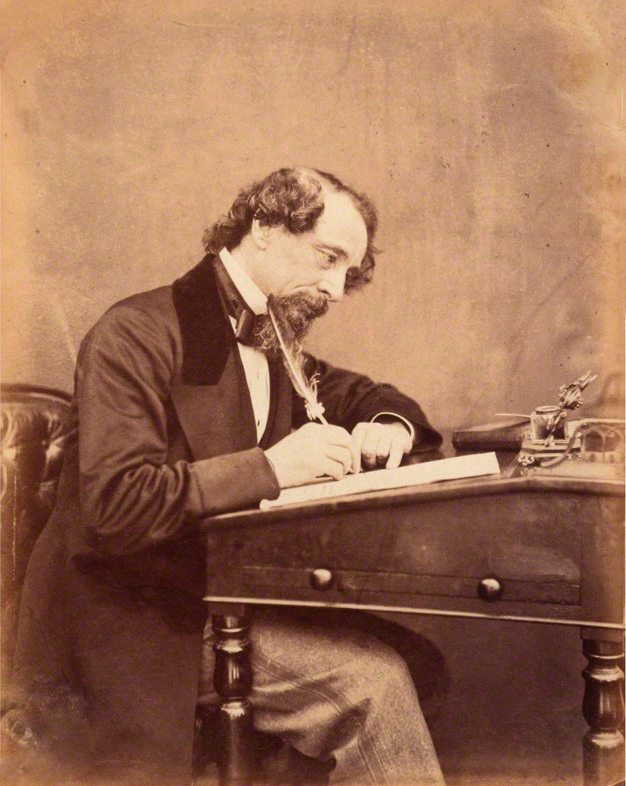
Charles Dickens (1812–1870). Photo from 1858.

Literary critic Catherine Ross Nickerson credits Louisa May Alcott with creating the second-oldest work of modern detective fiction, after Poe's Dupin stories, with the 1865 thriller "V.V., or Plots and Counterplots." A short story published anonymously by Alcott, the story concerns a Scottish aristocrat who tries to prove that a mysterious woman has killed his fiancée and cousin. The detective on the case, Antoine Dupres, is a parody of Auguste Dupin who is less concerned with solving the crime than he is in setting up a way to reveal the solution with a dramatic flourish. Ross Nickerson notes that many of the American writers who experimented with Poe's established rules of the genre were women, inventing a subgenre of domestic detective fiction that flourished for several generations. These included Metta Fuller Victor's two detective novels The Dead Letter (1867) and The Figure Eight (1869). The Dead Letter is noteworthy as the first full-length work of American crime fiction.

Émile Gaboriau was a pioneer of the detective fiction genre in France. In Monsieur Lecoq (1868), the title character is adept at disguise, a key characteristic of detectives. Gaboriau's writing is also considered to contain the first example of a detective minutely examining a crime scene for clues.

Another early example of a whodunit is a subplot in the novel Bleak House (1853) by Charles Dickens. The conniving lawyer Tulkinghorn is killed in his office late one night, and the crime is investigated by Inspector Bucket of the Metropolitan police force. Numerous characters appeared on the staircase leading to Tulkinghorn's office that night, some of them in disguise, and Inspector Bucket must penetrate these mysteries to identify the murderer. Dickens also left a novel unfinished at his death, The Mystery of Edwin Drood.

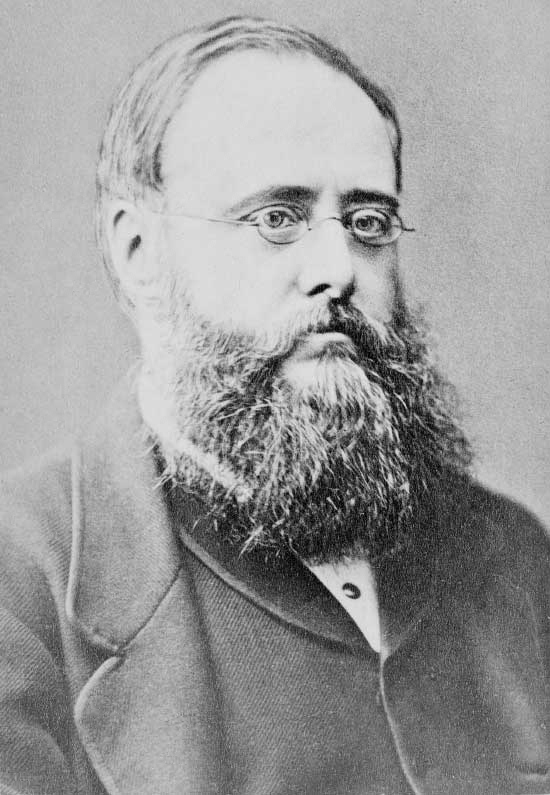
Wilkie Collins (1824–1889)

Dickens's protégé, Wilkie Collins (1824–1889)—sometimes called the "grandfather of English detective fiction"—is credited with the first great mystery novel, The Woman in White. T. S. Eliot called Collins's novel The Moonstone (1868) "the first, the longest, and the best of modern English detective novels... in a genre invented by Collins and not by Poe", and Dorothy L. Sayers called it "probably the very finest detective story ever written". The Moonstone contains a number of ideas that have established in the genre several classic features of the 20th century detective story:

- English country house robbery
- An "inside job"
- red herrings
- A celebrated, skilled, professional investigator
- Bungling local constabulary
- Detective inquiries
- Large number of false suspects
- The "least likely suspect"
- A rudimentary "locked room" murder
- A reconstruction of the crime
- A final twist in the plot

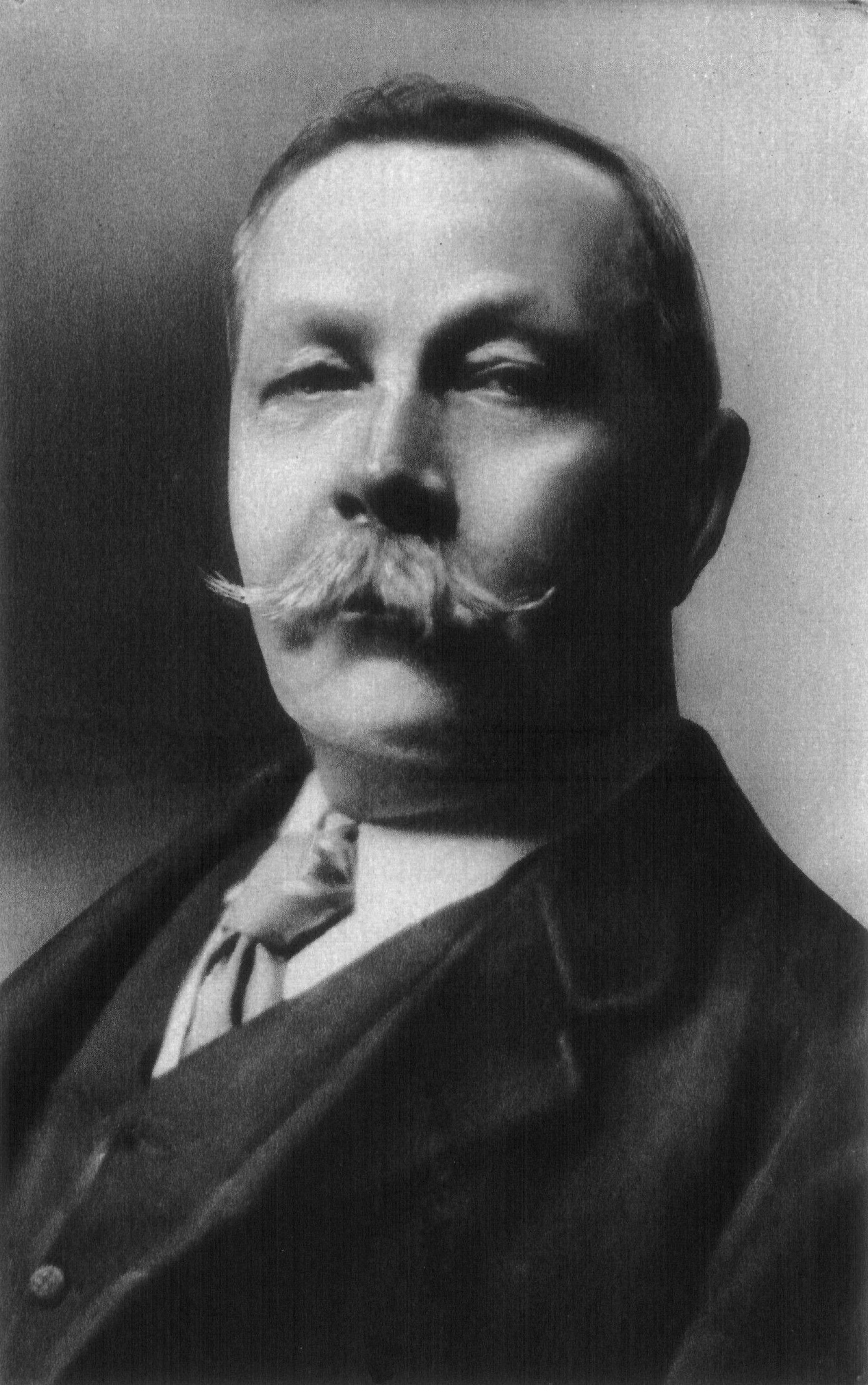
Arthur Conan Doyle (1859–1930)

Although The Moonstone is usually seen as the first detective novel, there are other contenders for the honor. A number of critics suggest that the lesser known Notting Hill Mystery (1862–63), written by the pseudonymous "Charles Felix" (later identified as Charles Warren Adams), preceded it by a number of years and first used techniques that would come to define the genre.

Literary critics Chris Willis and Kate Watson consider Mary Elizabeth Braddon's first book, the even earlier The Trail of the Serpent (1861), to be the first British detective novel. The Trail of the Serpent "features an innovative detective figure, Mr. Peters, who is lower class and mute, and who is initially dismissed both by the text and its characters." Braddon's later and better-remembered work, Aurora Floyd (printed in 1863 novel form, but serialized in 1862–63), also features a compelling detective in the person of Detective Grimstone of Scotland Yard.

Tom Taylor's melodrama The Ticket-of-Leave Man, an adaptation of Léonard by Édouard Brisbarre and Eugène Nus, appeared in 1863, introducing Hawkshaw the Detective. In short, it is difficult to establish who was the first to write the English-language detective novel, as various authors were exploring the theme simultaneously.

Anna Katharine Green, in her 1878 debut The Leavenworth Case and other works, popularized the genre among middle-class readers and helped to shape the genre into its classic form as well as developed the concept of the series detective.

In 1887, Arthur Conan Doyle created Sherlock Holmes, arguably the most famous of all fictional detectives. Although Sherlock Holmes is not the first fictional detective (he was influenced by Poe's Dupin and Gaboriau's Lecoq), his name has become synonymous for the part. Conan Doyle stated that the character of Holmes was inspired by Dr. Joseph Bell, for whom Doyle had worked as a clerk at the Edinburgh Royal Infirmary. Like Holmes, Bell was noted for drawing large conclusions from the smallest observations. A brilliant London-based "consulting detective" residing at 221B Baker Street, Holmes is famous for his intellectual prowess and is renowned for his skillful use of astute observation, deductive reasoning, and forensic skills to solve difficult cases. Conan Doyle wrote four novels and fifty-six short stories featuring Holmes, and all but four stories are narrated by Holmes's friend, assistant, and biographer, Dr. John H. Watson.

== Detective fiction in boys story papers ==
Detective fiction aimed at young male readers emerged as a distinct and highly popular subgenre in the late Victorian and Edwardian eras, particularly in British and American boys' weekly magazines. While school stories remained the dominant form of boys' fiction, detective narratives claimed a strong second place in popularity from the 1890s onward. The American market pioneered serial detective characters, with publications like the "Old Sleuth Library" (1872) and stories featuring Nick Carter establishing the format. In Britain, the genre gained prominence through publishers like James Henderson and Sons and the Aldine Publishing Company, which initially reprinted American detective stories before developing their own characters. The Amalgamated Press with its numerous story papers played a prominent part in the spreading and popularizations of the genre.

The most enduring figure in boys' detective fiction was Sexton Blake, who first appeared in 1893 and featured in over 3,000 stories spanning nearly six decades. Blake's longevity was matched by a period of intense creativity in the genre, which saw the creation of numerous competing detective characters. Notable among these was Nelson Lee, created by John William Staniforth (writing as Maxwell Scott), who shared Blake's penchant for globe-trotting adventures and narrow escapes.

The genre was characterized by several consistent features: most detectives had young assistants (like Blake's aide Tinker), operated from London addresses, and engaged in both domestic and international pursuits. These stories typically emphasized action and adventure over the cerebral puzzle-solving that characterized adult detective fiction. From the late Edwardian era onwards these detective tales often featured recurring master criminals and criminal organizations providing ongoing antagonists.

== Golden Age novels ==
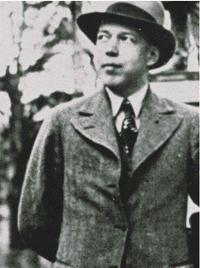
Mika Waltari (1908–1979), better known for his historical novels, also wrote crime novels such as Inspector Palmus.

The interwar period (the 1920s and 1930s) is generally referred to as the Golden Age of Detective Fiction. During this period, a number of very popular writers emerged, including mostly British but also a notable subset of American and New Zealand writers. Female writers constituted a major portion of notable Golden Age writers. Agatha Christie, Dorothy L. Sayers, Josephine Tey, Margery Allingham, and Ngaio Marsh were particularly famous female writers of this time. Apart from Marsh (a New Zealander), they were all British.

Various conventions of the detective genre were standardized during the Golden Age, and in 1929, some of them were codified by the English Catholic priest and author of detective stories Ronald Knox in his 'Decalogue' of rules for detective fiction. One of his rules was to avoid supernatural elements so that the focus remained on the mystery itself. Knox has contended that a detective story "must have as its main interest the unravelling of a mystery; a mystery whose elements are clearly presented to the reader at an early stage in the proceedings, and whose nature is such as to arouse curiosity, a curiosity which is gratified at the end." Another common convention in Golden Age detective stories involved an outsider–sometimes a salaried investigator or a police officer, but often a gifted amateur—investigating a murder committed in a closed environment by one of a limited number of suspects.

The most widespread subgenre of the detective novel became the whodunit (or whodunnit, short for "who done it?"). In this subgenre, great ingenuity may be exercised in narrating the crime, usually a homicide, and the subsequent investigation. This objective was to conceal the identity of the criminal from the reader until the end of the book, when the method and culprit are both revealed. According to scholars Carole Kismaric and Marvin Heiferman, "The golden age of detective fiction began with high-class amateur detectives sniffing out murderers lurking in rose gardens, down country lanes, and in picturesque villages. Many conventions of the detective-fiction genre evolved in this era, as numerous writers—from populist entertainers to respected poets—tried their hands at mystery stories."

John Dickson Carr—who also wrote as Carter Dickson—used the "puzzle" approach in his writing which was characterized by including a complex puzzle for the reader to try to unravel. He created ingenious and seemingly impossible plots and is regarded as the master of the "locked room mystery". Two of Carr's most famous works are The Case of Constant Suicides (1941) and The Hollow Man (1935). Another author, Cecil Street—who also wrote as John Rhode—wrote of a detective, Dr. Priestley, who specialised in elaborate technical devices. In the United States, the whodunit subgenre was adopted and extended by Rex Stout and Ellery Queen, along with others. The emphasis on formal rules during the Golden Age produced great works, albeit with highly standardized form. The most successful novels of this time included "an original and exciting plot; distinction in the writing, a vivid sense of place, a memorable and compelling hero and the ability to draw the reader into their comforting and highly individual world."

=== Agatha Christie ===
Agatha Christie is not only the most famous Golden Age writer, but also considered one of the most famous authors of all genres of all time. At the time of her death in 1976, "she was the best-selling novelist in history."

Many of the most popular books of the Golden Age were written by Agatha Christie. She produced long series of books featuring detective characters like Hercule Poirot and Miss Marple, among others. Her basing her stories on complex puzzles, "combined with her stereotyped characters and picturesque middle-class settings", is credited for her success. Christie's best-known works include Murder on the Orient Express (1934), Death on the Nile (1937), Three Blind Mice (1950) and And Then There Were None (1939).

== By country ==
=== China ===
Through China's Golden Age of crime fiction (1900–1949), translations of Western classics, and native Chinese detective fictions circulated within the country.

Cheng Xiaoqing had first encountered Sir Arthur Conan Doyle's highly popular stories as an adolescent. In the ensuing years, he played a major role in rendering them first into classical and later into vernacular Chinese. Cheng Xiaoqing, who had been self-taught in English from the age of 16, collaborated with a group of friends to translate the complete series of Sherlock Holmes stories into Chinese. Published in 1916 under the title Fuermosi tan'an (The Investigative Cases of Sherlock Holmes) by the Zhonghua shuju publishing house, this translation marked a significant milestone in the introduction of Western detective fiction to Chinese readers.

Cheng Xiaoqing's translated works from Conan Doyle introduced China to a new type of narrative style. Western detective fiction that was translated often emphasized "individuality, equality, and the importance of knowledge", appealing to China that it was the time for opening their eyes to the rest of the world.

This style began China's interest in popular crime fiction, and is what drove Cheng Xiaoqing to write his own crime fiction novel, Sherlock in Shanghai. In the late 1910s, Cheng began writing detective fiction inspired by Conan Doyle's style, with Bao as the Watson-like narrator; a rare instance of such a direct appropriation from foreign fiction. Famed as the "Oriental Sherlock Holmes", the duo Huo Sang and Bao Lang become counterparts to Doyle's Sherlock Holmes and Dr. Watson characters.

His 1914 short story "Dengguang renying" (灯光人影), published in the journal Xinwen bao (新闻报), is often credited as the first true Chinese detective story. This work laid the foundation for a series of stories centered on the character Huo Sang, a detective whose brilliance and methods bore a striking resemblance to those of Sherlock Holmes. Indeed, the parallels between the two detectives are unmistakable: not only do their names share the same initials, but both characters are defined by their extraordinary intellect, their reliance on abductive reasoning, and their unwavering skepticism toward seemingly supernatural phenomena. Huo Sang, much like his Western counterpart, became a cultural icon, embodying the rational, analytical spirit of the modern detective. Cheng Xiaoqing's creation of Huo Sang not only signaled the birth of a distinctly Chinese detective genre but also reflected the broader intellectual currents of the time, as Chinese writers sought to adapt Western literary forms to address local concerns and sensibilities.

=== Iran ===
"Sadiq Mamquli, The Sherlock Holmes of Iran, The Sherriff of Isfahan" is the first major detective fiction in Persian, written by Kazim Musta'an al-Sultan (Houshi Daryan). It was first published in 1925. There was no biographical account of the author of the book for over 70 years until being identified after the book was reprinted in 2017.

=== Japan ===
Edogawa Rampo is the first major Japanese modern mystery writer and the founder of the Detective Story Club in Japan. Rampo was an admirer of western mystery writers. He gained his fame in the early 1920s, when he began to bring to the genre many bizarre, erotic and even fantastic elements. This is partly because of the social tension before World War II. In 1957, Seicho Matsumoto received the Mystery Writers of Japan Award for his short story The Face (顔 kao). The Face and Matsumoto's subsequent works began the "social school" (社会派 shakai ha) within the genre, which emphasized social realism, described crimes in an ordinary setting and sets motives within a wider context of social injustice and political corruption. Since the 1980s, a "new orthodox school" (新本格派 shin honkaku ha) has surfaced. It demands restoration of the classic rules of detective fiction and the use of more self-reflective elements. Famous authors of this movement include Soji Shimada, Yukito Ayatsuji, Rintaro Norizuki, Alice Arisugawa, Kaoru Kitamura and Taku Ashibe. The Terror of Werewolf Castle (Jinrō-jō no Kyōfu) (1996–98) in 4 volumes by Nikaidō Reito is considered the current longest detective novel ever written but it has not been translated into English yet as of January 2026.

=== India ===
==== Byomkesh Bakshi (Character) ====
Created by famous Bengali novelist Sharadindu Bandyopadhyay, Byomkesh is one of the most iconic characters in Indian detective fiction. First appearing in the story Pother Kanta in 1932, Byomkesh, who refers to himself as a "truth-seeker" or Satyanweshi, is known for his acute observational skills and logical reasoning abilities. His adventures typically unfold against the backdrop of Calcutta, tackling a range of crimes, from intricate murder mysteries to drug trafficking, reflecting societal issues of the time. Accompanied by his loyal friend and chronicler, Ajit Kumar Banerjee, the stories are written in a blend of formal and colloquial Bengali, making them accessible to a wide audience. The character's legacy continues to influence contemporary detective fiction in India, highlighting the genre's evolution and its cultural significance.

==== Feluda (Character) ====
Feluda, created by renowned filmmaker and author Satyajit Ray, is a celebrated Bengali detective character who first appeared in the 1965 story Feludar Goyendagiri. His full name is Pradosh Chandra Mitra, and he is often referred to affectionately as Feluda. Feluda is characterized by his keen observational skills, sharp intellect, and a flair for deduction, which he employs to solve intricate mysteries. Feluda is often accompanied by his cousin, who is also his assistant, Tapesh Ranjan Mitter (affectionately called Topshe), who serves as the narrator of the stories and his friend Jatayu. The trio embarks on various adventures that blend mystery with elements of Bengali culture and tradition. The stories often include a touch of humor, engaging dialogues, and philosophical musings, making them appealing to a wide audience. Ray's Feluda series not only captivated readers in literary form but also inspired numerous adaptations in film and television, showcasing Ray's cinematic genius. Feluda's impact on the genre is significant, as he represents a sophisticated blend of intellect and charm, setting a high standard for detective fiction in India.

==== Other Bengali detectives ====
Hemendra Kumar Roy was an Indian Bengali writer noted for his contribution to the early development of the genre with his 'Jayanta-Manik' and adventurist 'Bimal-Kumar' stories, dealing with the exploits of Jayanta, his assistant Manik, and police inspector Sunderbabu.

Mitin Masi is a fictional Bengali female detective character created by Suchitra Bhattacharya.

Colonel Niladri Sarkar is a fictional detective character created by Bengali novelist Syed Mustafa Siraj.

==== Malayalam ====
Kottayam Pushpanath, a prolific writer, brought to life a vivid array of characters and mysteries. Pushpanath practiced teaching history for several years before becoming a full time writer. It was in the last 1960s that he made his literary debut with Chuvanna Manushyan. Pushpanath authored more than 350 detective novels.

=== Pakistan ===
Ibn-e-Safi is the most popular Urdo detective fiction writer. He started writing his famous Jasoosi Dunya Series spy stories in 1952 with Col. Fareedi & Captain. Hameed as main characters. In 1955 he started writing Imran Series spy novels with Ali Imran as X2 the chief of secret service and his companions. After his death many other writers accepted Ali Imran character and wrote spy novels.

Another popular spy novel writer was Ishtiaq Ahmad who wrote Inspector Jamsheed, Inspector Kamran Mirza and Shooki brother's series of spy novels.

=== Russia ===
Stories about robbers and detectives were very popular in Russia since old times. A famous hero in the eighteenth century was Ivan Osipov (1718–after 1756), nicknamed Ivan Kain. Other examples of early Russian detective stories include: "Bitter Fate" (1789) by M. D. Chulkov (1743–1792), "The Finger Ring" (1831) by Yevgeny Baratynsky, "The White Ghost" (1834) by Mikhail Zagoskin, Crime and Punishment (1866) and The Brothers Karamazov (1880) by Fyodor Dostoevsky. Detective fiction in modern Russian literature with clear detective plots started with The Garin Death Ray (1926–1927) and The Black Gold (1931) by Aleksey Nikolayevich Tolstoy, Mess-Mend by Marietta Shaginyan, The Investigator's Notes by Lev Sheinin. Boris Akunin is a famous Russian writer of historical detective fiction in modern-day Russia.

=== United States ===
In the United States, detective fiction emerged in the 1920s, and flourished with stories in pulp magazines. The genre gained prominence in later decades, as the detective character was refined, and became familiar through movies (often film noir). Detective fiction was also a way for authors to bring stories about various subcultures to mainstream audiences. One scholar wrote about the detective novels of Tony Hillerman, set among the Native American population around New Mexico, "many American readers have probably gotten more insight into traditional Navajo culture from his detective stories than from any other recent books." Other notable writers who have explored regional and ethnic communities in their detective novels are Harry Kemelman, whose Rabbi Small series were set in the Conservative Jewish community of Massachusetts; Walter Mosley, whose Easy Rawlins books are set in the African American community of 1950s Los Angeles; and Sara Paretsky, whose V. I. Warshawski books have explored the various subcultures of Chicago.

=== Vietnam ===
Detective fiction is a relatively new genre in Vietnamese literature. The first Vietnamese-made detective novel, A Secret Agent's Tales by Biến Ngũ Nhy, appeared in 1917, as a column in a Catholic newspaper. The genre boomed from 1930 to 1945. Phạm Cao Củng, the "King of Vietnamese detective stories", published over 20 detective novels, primarily "three-penny novels" written for the masses, with his first set appearing in 1937. One series of novels featured a gang leader named Tám Huỳnh Kỳ, based on Arsene Lupin; another set was centered around Detective Kỳ Phát, who was inspired by Sherlock Holmes. Famed author and poet Thế Lữ also wrote a number of detective stories from 1934 to 1940. Some of his works featured a Vietnamese investigator who solved crimes with cold logic and skillful deductive reasoning. This Holmes-like character was highly independent and very individualist, unusual traits in Vietnamese society. The genre waned in popularity after the end of the French Indochina War in 1954, but enjoyed a new revival in the 1980s in the wake of the Đổi Mới reforms.

== Subgenres ==
=== Hardboiled ===
Martin Hewitt, created by British author Arthur Morrison in 1894, is one of the first examples of the modern style of fictional private detective. This character is described as an "'Everyman' detective meant to challenge the detective-as-superman that Holmes represented."

By the late 1920s, Al Capone and the American mafia inspired not only fear, but piqued mainstream curiosity about the American criminal underworld. Popular pulp fiction magazines like Black Mask capitalized on this, as authors such as Carrol John Daly published violent stories that focused on the mayhem and injustice surrounding the criminals, not the circumstances behind the crime. Very often, no actual mystery even existed: the books simply revolved around justice being served to those who deserved harsh treatment, which was described in explicit detail." The overall theme these writers portrayed reflected "the changing face of America itself."

In the 1930s, the private eye genre was adopted wholeheartedly by American writers. One of the primary contributors to this style was Dashiell Hammett with his famous private investigator character, Sam Spade. His style of crime fiction came to be known as "hardboiled", a genre that "usually deals with criminal activity in a modern urban environment, a world of disconnected signs and anonymous strangers." "Told in stark and sometimes elegant language through the unemotional eyes of new hero-detectives, these stories were an American phenomenon."

In the late 1930s, Raymond Chandler updated the form with his private detective Philip Marlowe, who brought a more intimate voice to the detective than the more distanced "operative's report" style of Hammett's Continental Op stories. Chandler's stories were noted for their evocations of the American criminal underworld, including dark alleys and tough thugs, rich women and powerful men. Several feature and television movies have been made about the Philip Marlowe character. James Hadley Chase wrote a few novels with private eyes as the main heroes, including Blonde's Requiem (1945), Lay Her Among the Lilies (1950), and Figure It Out for Yourself (1950). The heroes of these novels are typical private eyes, very similar to or plagiarizing Raymond Chandler's work.

Ross Macdonald, pseudonym of Kenneth Millar, updated the form again with his detective Lew Archer. Archer, like Hammett's fictional heroes, was a camera eye, with hardly any known past. "Turn Archer sideways, and he disappears," one reviewer wrote. Critics praised Macdonald's use of psychology and his prose, which was full of imagery. Like other 'hardboiled' writers, Macdonald aimed to give an impression of realism in his work through violence, sex and confrontation. The 1966 movie Harper starring Paul Newman was based on the first Lew Archer story The Moving Target (1949). Newman reprised the role in The Drowning Pool in 1976.

Michael Collins, pseudonym of Dennis Lynds, is generally considered the author who led the form into the Modern Age. Like Hammett, Chandler, and Macdonald, Collins' protagonist was a private investigator, Dan Fortune. However, Collins stories also involved an element of sociological reflection, exploring the meaning of his characters' places in society and the impact society had on people. Full of commentary and clipped prose, his books were more intimate than those of his predecessors, dramatizing that crime can happen in one's own living room.

The "hardboiled" novel was a male-dominated field in which female authors seldom found publication until Marcia Muller, Sara Paretsky, and Sue Grafton were finally published in the late 1970s and early 1980s. Each author's detective, also female, was brainy and physical and could hold her own. Their acceptance, and success, caused publishers to seek out other female authors.

=== Inverted ===
An inverted detective story, also known as a "howcatchem", is a murder mystery fiction structure in which the commission of the crime is shown or described at the beginning, usually including the identity of the perpetrator. The story then describes the detective's attempt to solve the mystery. There may also be subsidiary puzzles, such as why the crime was committed, and they are explained or resolved during the story. This format is the inversion of the more typical "whodunit", in which the perpetrator of the crime is not revealed until the story's climax.

=== Police procedural ===
Many detective stories have police officers as the main characters. These stories may take a variety of forms, but many authors try to realistically depict the routine activities of a group of police officers who are frequently working on more than one case simultaneously. Some of these stories are whodunits; in others, the criminal is well known, and the detective must gather enough evidence to charge them with the crime.

In the 1940s the police procedural evolved as a new style of detective fiction. Unlike the heroes of Christie, Chandler, and Spillane, the police detective was subject to error and was constrained by rules and regulations. As Gary Huasladen writes in Places for Dead Bodies, "not all the clients were insatiable bombshells, and invariably there was life outside the job." The detective in the police procedural does the things police officers do to catch a criminal. Prominent writers in the genre include Ed McBain, P. D. James, and Bartholomew Gill.

=== Historical mystery ===
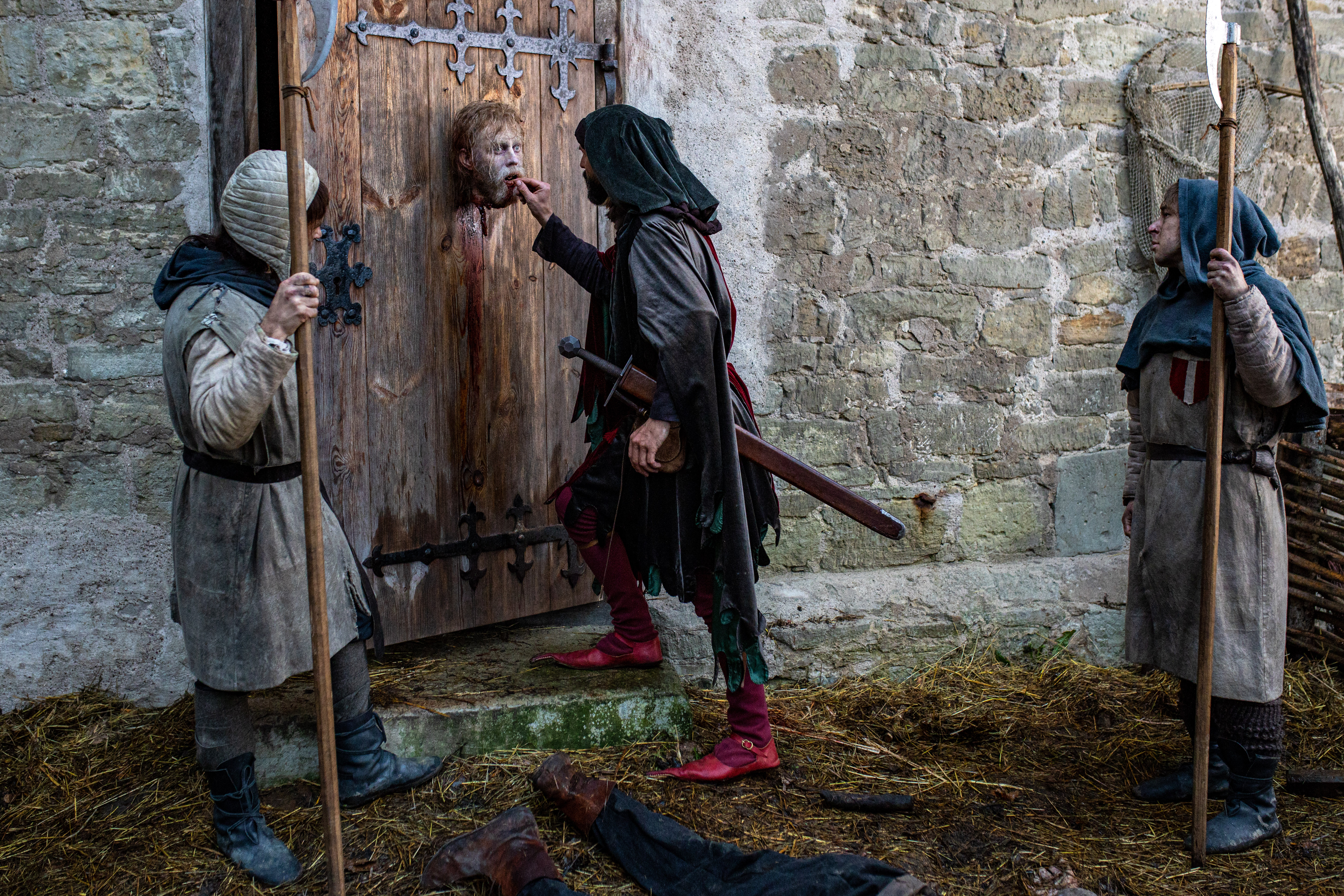
Estonian writer Indrek Hargla is known for his Melchior the Apothecary series, which takes place in medieval Tallinn and has also been adapted into films

Historical mystery is set in a time period considered historical from the author's perspective, and the central plot involves the solving of a mystery or crime (usually murder). Though works combining these genres have existed since at least the early 20th century, many credit Ellis Peters's Cadfael Chronicles (1977–1994) for popularizing what would become known as the historical mystery.

A variation on this is Josephine Tey's The Daughter of Time. In it, Scotland Yard Inspector Alan Grant—who considers himself a good judge of faces—is surprised to find that what he considers to be the portrait of a sensitive man is in reality a portrait of Richard III, who murdered his brother's children in order to become king. The story details his attempt to get to the historical truth of whether Richard III is the villain he has been made out to be by history. The novel was awarded the top spot in the Top 100 Crime Novels of All Time by the UK Crime Writers' Association and the number 4 spot in The Top 100 Mystery Novels of All Time Mystery Writers of America

=== Cozy mystery ===
Cozy mystery began in the late 20th century as a reinvention of the Golden Age whodunit; these novels generally shy away from violence and suspense and frequently feature female amateur detectives. Modern cozy mysteries are frequently, though not necessarily, humorous and thematic. Variations of the subgenre include culinary mystery, animal mystery, and quilting mystery, among others.

Cozy mysteries feature minimal violence, sex, and social relevance; a solution achieved by intellect or intuition rather than police procedure, with order restored in the end; honorable characters; and a setting in a closed community. Writers include Agatha Christie, Dorothy L. Sayers, and Elizabeth Daly.

=== Serial killer mystery ===
Serial killer mystery might be thought of as a variation of the police procedural. There are early mystery novels in which a police force attempts to contend with the type of criminal known in the 1920s as a homicidal maniac, such as a few of the early novels of Philip Macdonald and Ellery Queen's Cat of Many Tails. However, this sort of story became much more popular after the coining of the phrase "serial killer" in the 1970s and the publication of The Silence of the Lambs in 1988. These stories frequently show the activities of many members of a police force or government agency in their efforts to apprehend a killer who is selecting victims on some obscure basis. They are also often much more violent and suspenseful than other mysteries.

=== Legal thriller ===
The legal thriller, or courtroom novel, is also related to detective fiction. The system of justice itself is always a major part of these works, at times almost functioning as one of the characters. In this way, the legal system provides the framework for the legal thriller as much as the system of modern police work does for the police procedural. The legal thriller usually begins with the court proceedings following the closure of an investigation, often resulting in a new angle on the investigation, so as to bring about an outcome different from the one originally devised by the investigators. In the legal thriller, court proceedings play a very active, if not to say decisive part in a case reaching its ultimate solution. Erle Stanley Gardner popularized the courtroom novel in the 20th century with his Perry Mason series. Contemporary authors of legal thrillers include Michael Connelly, Linda Fairstein, John Grisham, John Lescroart, Paul Levine, Lisa Scottoline, and Scott Turow.

=== Locked room mystery ===
The locked room mystery is a subgenre of detective fiction in which a crime—almost always murder—is committed under circumstances which it was seemingly impossible for the perpetrator to commit the crime and/or evade detection in the course of getting in and out of the crime scene. The genre was established in the 19th century. Edgar Allan Poe's "The Murders in the Rue Morgue" (1841) is considered the first locked-room mystery; since then, other authors have used the scheme. The crime in question typically involves a crime scene with no indication as to how the intruder could have entered or left, i.e., a locked room. Following other conventions of classic detective fiction, the reader is normally presented with the puzzle and all of the clues, and is encouraged to solve the mystery before the solution is revealed in a dramatic climax.

=== Occult ===
Occult detective fiction is a subgenre of detective fiction that combines the tropes of detective fiction with those of supernatural horror fiction. Unlike the traditional detective, the occult detective is employed in cases involving ghosts, demons, curses, magic, monsters and other supernatural elements. Some occult detectives are portrayed as knowing magic or being themselves psychic or in possession of other paranormal powers.

=== 'Whodunit' ===
A whodunit or whodunnit (a colloquial elision of "Who [has] done it?" or "Who did it?") is a complex, plot-driven variety of the detective story in which the audience is given the opportunity to engage in the same process of deduction as the protagonist throughout the investigation of a crime. The reader or viewer is provided with the clues from which the identity of the perpetrator may be deduced before the story provides the revelation itself at its climax. The "whodunit" flourished during the so-called "Golden Age" of detective fiction, between 1920 and 1950, when it was the predominant mode of crime writing.

== Modern criticism ==
=== Preserving story secrets ===
Even if they do not mean to, advertisers, reviewers, scholars and aficionados sometimes give away details or parts of the plot, and sometimes—for example in the case of Mickey Spillane's novel I, the Jury—even the solution. After the credits of Billy Wilder's film Witness for the Prosecution, the cinemagoers are asked not to talk to anyone about the plot so that future viewers will also be able to fully enjoy the unravelling of the mystery. At the end of each performance of the play The Mousetrap by Agatha Christie, audiences are asked not to reveal the identity of the murderer to anyone outside the theatre, so that the end of the play is not spoiled for future audiences.

=== Plausibility and coincidence ===
For series involving amateur detectives, their frequent encounters with crime often test the limits of plausibility. The character Miss Marple appears in twelve novels and twenty short stories, William L. De Andrea has described Marple's home town, the quiet little village of St. Mary Mead, as having "put on a pageant of human depravity rivaled only by that of Sodom and Gomorrah". Similarly, TV heroine Jessica Fletcher of Murder, She Wrote was confronted with bodies wherever she went, but most notably in her small hometown of Cabot Cove, Maine; The New York Times estimated that, by the end of the series' 12-year run, nearly 2% of the town's residents had been killed. It is arguably more convincing if police, forensic experts or similar professionals are made the protagonist of a series of crime novels.

The television series Monk has often made fun of this implausible frequency. The main character, Adrian Monk, is frequently accused of being a "bad luck charm" and a "murder magnet" as the result of the frequency with which murder happens in his vicinity.

Likewise Kogoro Mori of the manga series Detective Conan earned a similar reputation. Although Mori is actually a private investigator with his own agency, the police never intentionally consult him as he stumbles from one crime scene to another.

The role and legitimacy of coincidence has frequently been the topic of heated arguments ever since Ronald A. Knox categorically stated that "no accident must ever help the detective" (Commandment No. 6 in his "Decalogue").

=== Effects of technology ===
Technological progress has also rendered many plots implausible and antiquated. For example, the predominance of mobile phones, pagers, and PDAs has significantly altered the previously dangerous situations in which investigators traditionally might have found themselves.

One tactic that avoids the issue of technology altogether is the historical detective genre. As global interconnectedness makes legitimate suspense more difficult to achieve, several writers—including Elizabeth Peters, P. C. Doherty, Steven Saylor, and Lindsey Davis—have eschewed fabricating convoluted plots in order to manufacture tension, instead opting to set their characters in some former period. Such a strategy forces the protagonist to rely on more inventive means of investigation, lacking as they do the technological tools available to modern detectives.

Conversely, some detective fiction embraces networked computer technology and deals in cybercrime, like the Daemon novel series by Daniel Suarez.

== Detective Commandments ==
Several authors have attempted to set forth a sort of list of "Detective Commandments" for prospective authors of the genre.

According to "Twenty Rules for Writing Detective Stories," by Van Dine in 1928: "The detective story is a kind of intellectual game. It is more—it is a sporting event. And for the writing of detective stories there are very definite laws—unwritten, perhaps, but nonetheless binding; and every respectable and self-respecting concocter of literary mysteries lives up to them. Herewith, then, is a sort of credo, based partly on the practice of all the great writers of detective stories, and partly on the promptings of the honest author's inner conscience." Ronald Knox wrote a set of Ten Commandments or Decalogue in 1929, see article on the Golden Age of Detective Fiction.

A general consensus among crime fiction authors is there is a specific set of rules that must be applied for a novel to truly be considered part of the detective fiction genre. As noted in "Introduction to the Analysis of Crime Fiction", crime fiction from the past 100 years has generally contained the following key rules to be a detective novel:

- A crime, most often murder, is committed early in the narrative
- There are a variety of suspects with different motives
- A central character formally or informally acts as a detective
- The detective collects evidence about the crimes and its victim
- Usually the detective interviews the suspects, as well as the witnesses
- The detective solves the mystery and indicates the real criminal
- Usually this criminal is now arrested or otherwise punished

== Influential fictional detectives ==
=== Sherlock Holmes ===
Sherlock Holmes is an English fictional detective created by Sir Arthur Conan Doyle. After first appearing in A Study in Scarlet, the Sherlock Holmes stories were not an immediate success. However, after being published in the Strand Magazine in 1891, the detective became unquestionably popular. Following the success of Sherlock Holmes, many mystery writers imitated Conan Doyle's structure in their own detective stories and included aspects of Sherlock Holmes's personalities in their own detectives.

Sherlock Holmes as a series is perhaps the most popular form of detective fiction. Conan Doyle attempted to kill the character off after twenty-three stories, but after popular request, he continued to write stories featuring the character. The popularity of Sherlock Holmes extends beyond the written medium. For example, the BBC-produced TV series Sherlock gained a very large following after first airing in 2010, imbuing a renewed interest in the character in the general public. Because of the popularity of Holmes, Conan Doyle was often regarded as being "as well known as Queen Victoria".

=== Sexton Blake ===
Sexton Blake is a fictional British detective, whose adventures captivated readers for over eight decades from 1893 to 1978. Blake featured in more than 4,000 stories by approximately 200 different authors, making him one of the most prolifically chronicled characters in English literature. The detective's adventures spanned multiple formats including comic strips, novels, radio serials, silent films, and a 1960s ITV television series, reaching audiences across Britain and internationally in various languages.

Initially conceived as a Victorian gentleman detective, Blake evolved significantly over time, acquiring now-iconic elements like his Baker Street residence, his young assistant Tinker, his bloodhound Pedro, and his housekeeper Mrs. Bardell. While often compared to Sherlock Holmes, Blake's adventures typically featured more action-oriented plots and coloruful adversaries, many of whom were recurring master criminals. Blake had many rivals and imitators: Nelson Lee, Dixon Hawke, Carfax Baines, Kenyon Ford, Stanley Dare, Ferrers Locke, and many others now long forgotten. Blake reached his peak popularity during the 1920s and early 1930s, particularly through publications like The Union Jack and The Sexton Blake Library, which at its height published five times monthly.

=== Hercule Poirot ===
Hercule Poirot is a fictional Belgian private detective, created by Agatha Christie. As one of Christie's most famous and long-lived characters, Poirot appeared in 33 novels, one play (Black Coffee), and more than 50 short stories, published between 1920 and 1975. Hercule Poirot first appeared in The Mysterious Affair at Styles, published in 1920, and died in Curtain, published in 1975, which is Agatha Christie's last work. On August 6, 1975, The New York Times published the obituary of Poirot's death with the cover of the newly published novel on their front page.

=== C. Auguste Dupin ===
Le Chevalier C. Auguste Dupin is a fictional character created by Edgar Allan Poe. Dupin made his first appearance in Poe's "The Murders in the Rue Morgue" (1841), widely considered the first detective fiction story. He reappears in "The Mystery of Marie Rogêt" (1842) and "The Purloined Letter" (1844).

C. Auguste Dupin is generally acknowledged as the prototype for many fictional detectives that were created later, including Sherlock Holmes by Arthur Conan Doyle and Hercule Poirot by Agatha Christie. Conan Doyle once wrote, "Each [of Poe's detective stories] is a root from which a whole literature has developed... Where was the detective story until Poe breathed the breath of life into it?"

=== Ellery Queen ===
Ellery Queen is a fictional detective created by American writers Manfred Bennington Lee and Frederic Dannay, who were cousins, as well as their joint pseudonym. He first appeared in The Roman Hat Mystery (1929), and starred in more than 30 novels and several short story collections. During the 1930s and much of the 1940s, Ellery Queen was possibly the best known American fictional detective.

== Detective debuts and swan songs ==
Many detectives appear in more than one novel or story. Here is a list of a few debut stories and final appearances.

Detective	Author	Debut	Final appearance
Misir Ali	Humayun Ahmed	Devi	Jakhan Namibe Andhar
Roderick Alleyn	Ngaio Marsh	A Man Lay Dead	Light Thickens
Sir John Appleby	Michael Innes	Death at the President's Lodging	Appleby and the Ospreys
Lew Archer	Ross Macdonald	The Moving Target	The Blue Hammer
Byomkesh Bakshi	Sharadindu Bandyopadhyay	Satyanweshi	Bishupal Badh
Alan Banks	Peter Robinson	Gallows View	
Parashor Barma	Premendra Mitra	Goenda Kobi Parashar	Ghanada O Dui Doshor Mamababu O Parashar
Tom Barnaby	Caroline Graham	The Killings at Badger's Drift	A Ghost in the Machine
J. P. Beaumont	J. A. Jance	Until Proven Guilty	
Martin Beck	Maj Sjöwall and Per Wahlöö	Roseanna	The Terrorists
Bimal	Hemendra Kumar Roy	Jakher Dhan	
Anita Blake	Laurell K. Hamilton	Guilty Pleasures	
Sexton Blake	Harry Blyth, George Hamilton Teed, Edwy Searles Brooks	The Missing Millionaire	
Harry Bosch	Michael Connelly	The Black Echo	
Joanna Brady	J. A. Jance	Desert Heat	
Jackson Brodie	Kate Atkinson	Case Histories	
Father Brown	G. K. Chesterton	"The Blue Cross"	"The Mask of Midas"
Brother Cadfael	Ellis Peters	A Morbid Taste for Bones	Brother Cadfael's Penance
Jack Caffery	Mo Hayder	Birdman	Wolf
Vincent Calvino	Christopher G. Moore	Spirit House	
Albert Campion	Margery Allingham	The Crime at Black Dudley	The Mind Readers (last story completed by Allingham)
Albert Campion	Margery Allingham	The Crime at Black Dudley	Mr. Campion's Falcon (last story completed by Philip Youngman Carter)
Albert Campion	Margery Allingham	The Crime at Black Dudley	(Series continues written by Mike Ripley)
Georgia Cantini	Grazia Verasani	Quo Vadis, Baby?	
Nick and Nora Charles	Dashiell Hammett	The Thin Man	
Cao Chen	Xiaolong Qiu	Death of a Red Heroine	
Elvis Cole	Robert Crais	The Monkey's Raincoat	
Quinn Colson	Ace Atkins	The Ranger	
The Continental Op	Dashiell Hammett	Arson Plus	The Dain Curse
Lord Edward Corinth and Verity Browne	David Roberts	Sweet Poison	Sweet Sorrow
Jerry Cornelius	Michael Moorcock	The Final Programme	
Dr. Phil D'Amato	Paul Levinson	"The Chronology Protection Case"	
Harry D'Amour	Clive Barker	"The Last Illusion"	
Adam Dalgliesh	PD James	Cover Her Face	The Private Patient
Andrew Dalziel and Peter Pascoe	Reginald Hill	A Clubbable Woman	Midnight Fugue
Peter Decker	Faye Kellerman	The Ritual Bath	
Alex Delaware	Jonathan Kellerman	When the Bough Breaks	
Harry Devlin	Martin Edwards	All the Lonely People	
Peter Diamond	Peter Lovesey	The Last Detective	
Harry Dresden	Jim Butcher	Storm Front	
Nancy Drew	Carolyn Keene	The Secret of the Old Clock	
Auguste Dupin	Edgar Allan Poe	The Murders in the Rue Morgue	The Purloined Letter
Marcus Didius Falco	Lindsey Davis	The Silver Pigs	
Feluda	Satyajit Ray	Feludar Goendagiri	Robertson-er Ruby
Erast Fandorin	Boris Akunin	The Winter Queen	
Kate Fansler	Amanda Cross	In the Last Analysis	The Edge of Doom
Dr. Gideon Fell	John Dickson Carr	Hag's Nook	Dark of the Moon
Gervase Fen	Edmund Crispin	The Case of the Gilded Fly	The Glimpses of the Moon
Sir John Fielding and Jeremy Proctor	Bruce Alexander	Blind Justice	Rules of Engagement
Tecumseh Fox	Rex Stout	Double for Death	The Broken Vase
Rei Furuya	Gosho Aoyama	Detective Conan	
Dirk Gently (Svlad Cjelli)	Douglas Adams	Dirk Gently's Holistic Detective Agency	The Long Dark Tea-Time of the Soul (last completed work)
Dirk Gently (Svlad Cjelli)	Douglas Adams	Dirk Gently's Holistic Detective Agency	The Salmon of Doubt (unfinished)
Ganesh Ghote	H. R. F. Keating	The Perfect Murder	A Small Case for Inspector Ghote?
George Gideon	John Creasey	Gideon's Day	Gideon's Drive
Gordianus the Finder	Steven Saylor	Roman Blood	
Saguru Hakuba	Gosho Aoyama	Magic Kaito	
Mike Hammer	Mickey Spillane	I, the Jury	Black Alley (last story completed by Spillane)
Mike Hammer	Mickey Spillane	I, the Jury	(Series continues from unfinished Spillane manuscripts completed by Max Allan Collins)
The Hardy Boys	(ghostwriters)	The Tower Treasure	
Heiji Hattori	Gosho Aoyama	Detective Conan	
Dixon Hawke	Unknown author for DC Thomson	The Great Hotel Mystery	
Tony Hill	Val McDermid	The Mermaids Singing	
Neil Hockaday	Thomas Adcock	Sea of Green	Grief Street
Sherlock Holmes	Sir Arthur Conan Doyle	A Study in Scarlet	The Adventure of Shoscombe Old Place
Ed & Ambrose Hunter	Fredric Brown	The Fabulous Clipjoint	Mrs. Murphy's Underpants
Jayanta	Hemendra Kumar Roy	Jayanter Keerti	
Art Keller	Don Winslow	The Power of the Dog	
Craig Kennedy	Arthur B. Reeve	The Silent Bullet	The Stars Scream Murder
Sammy Keyes	Wendelin Van Draanen	Sammy Keyes and the Hotel Thief	
Kikira	Bimal Kar	Kapalikera Ekhono Ache	Ekti Photo Churir Rahasya
Shinichi Kudo / Conan Edogawa	Gosho Aoyama	Detective Conan	
Jake Lassiter	Paul Levine	"To Speak For The Dead"	
Charles Latimer	Eric Ambler	The Mask of Dimitrios (AKA A Coffin for Dimitrios)	The Intercom Conspiracy
Joe Leaphorn	Tony Hillerman	The Blessing Way	
Nelson Lee	Maxwell Scott	A Dead Man's Secret	Waldo, the Gang Buster
Inspector Lund	Willy Corsari	Het Mysterie van de Mondscheinsonate (The Mystery of the Moonlight Sonata)	Spelen met de Dood (Playing with Death)
Thomas Lynley and Barbara Havers	Elizabeth George	A Great Deliverance	
John Madden	Rennie Airth	River of Darkness	
Jules Maigret	Georges Simenon	The Strange Case of Peter the Lett	Maigret and Monsieur Charles
Philip Marlowe	Raymond Chandler	The Big Sleep	Playback
Miss Marple	Agatha Christie	The Murder at the Vicarage	Sleeping Murder
Darren Matthews	Attica Locke	Bluebird, Bluebird	
Travis McGee	John D. MacDonald	The Deep Blue Good-by	The Lonely Silver Rain
Sir Henry Merrivale	Carter Dickson	The Plague Court Murders	The Cavalier's Cup
Kinsey Millhone	Sue Grafton	"A" Is for Alibi	"Y" Is for Yesterday
Kiyoshi Mitarai	Soji Shimada	The Tokyo Zodiac Murders	Final Pitch
Kogoro Mori	Gosho Aoyama	Detective Conan	
Inspector Morse	Colin Dexter	Last Bus to Woodstock	Remorseful Day
Thursday Next	Jasper Fforde	The Eyre Affair	
Gideon Oliver	Aaron Elkins	Fellowship of Fear	
Jimmy Perez	Ann Cleeves	Raven Black	
Stephanie Plum	Janet Evanovich	One for the Money	
Hercule Poirot	Agatha Christie	The Mysterious Affair at Styles	Curtain
Ellery Queen	Ellery Queen	The Roman Hat Mystery	A Fine and Private Place
Jack Reacher	Lee Child	Killing Floor	
Precious Ramotswe	Alexander McCall Smith	The No. 1 Ladies' Detective Agency	
John Rebus	Ian Rankin	Knots and Crosses	
Dave Robicheaux	James Lee Burke	The Neon Rain	
Kiriti Roy	Nihar Ranjan Gupta	Kalo Bhramar	Avagunthita
Lincoln Rhyme	Jeffery Deaver	The Bone Collector	
Huo Sang	Chen Xiaoqing	The Shadow in the Lamplight	
Matthew Scudder	Lawrence Block	The Sins of the Fathers	
Masumi Sera	Gosho Aoyama	Detective Conan	
Dan Shepherd	Stephen Leather	True Colours	
Miss Silver	Patricia Wentworth	Grey Mask	The Girl in the Cellar
Arthur Simpson	Eric Ambler	The Light of Day	Dirty Story
Rabbi David Small	Harry Kemelman	Friday the Rabbi Slept Late	That Day the Rabbi Left Town
Sam Spade	Dashiell Hammett	The Maltese Falcon	They Can Only Hang You Once
Spenser	Robert B. Parker	The Godwulf Manuscript	Sixkill (last novel completed by Parker)
Spenser	Robert B. Parker	The Godwulf Manuscript	(Series continues written by Ace Atkins)
Vera Stanhope	Ann Cleeves	The Crow Trap	
Cormoran Strike	J.K. Rowling (under the pen name Robert Galbraith)	The Cuckoo's Calling	
Tintin	Hergé	Tintin in the Land of the Soviets	Tintin and the Picaros (last completed work)
Tintin	Hergé	Tintin in the Land of the Soviets	Tintin and Alph-Art (unfinished)
Tommy and Tuppence (Thomas and Prudence Beresford)	Agatha Christie	The Secret Adversary	Postern of Fate
Philip Trent	E. C. Bentley	Trent's Last Case	Trent Intervenes
Kurt Wallander	Henning Mankell	Faceless Killers	The Troubled Man
V.I. Warshawski	Sara Paretsky	Indemnity Only	
Willam Warwick	Jeffrey Archer	Nothing Ventured	
Reginald Wexford	Ruth Rendell	From Doon with Death	No Man's Nightingale
Lord Peter Wimsey	Dorothy L. Sayers	Whose Body?	Busman's Honeymoon (last novel completed by Sayers)
Lord Peter Wimsey	Dorothy L. Sayers	Whose Body?	"Talboys" (last story written by Sayers)
Lord Peter Wimsey	Dorothy L. Sayers	Whose Body?	The Late Scholar (last story completed by Jill Paton Walsh)
Nero Wolfe	Rex Stout	Fer-de-Lance	A Family Affair (last novel completed by Stout)
Nero Wolfe	Rex Stout	Fer-de-Lance	(Series continues written by Robert Goldsborough)
Manabu Yukawa	Keigo Higashino	Tantei Galileo (AKA Detective Galileo)	
Hajime Kindaichi	Yozaburo Kanari, Seimaru Amagi and Fumiya Sato	The Kindaichi Case Files	

== See also ==
- Closed circle of suspects
- Crime jazz
- List of Ace mystery double titles
- List of Ace mystery letter-series single titles
- List of Ace mystery numeric-series single titles
- List of crime writers
- List of detective fiction authors
- List of female detective characters
- Mafia
- Metaphysical detective story
- Mystery film
