= John Shannon =

John Shannon may refer to:

- John Shannon (politician) (1862–1926), Australian politician
- John Shannon (musician) (born 1980), American modern folk guitarist, vocalist, and composer
- John Shannon (novelist) (born 1943), American author, lately of detective fiction
- John Shannon (sportscaster) (born 1956), Canadian sportscaster & television producer
- John W. Shannon (1933–2017), United States Under Secretary of the Army
- John Shannon (defensive lineman) (born 1965), American football player
- John Shannon (long snapper), American football player
