= Rules of Engagement (Alexander novel) =

2005 novel by Bruce Cook

- Author: Bruce Cook (writing as Bruce Alexander)
- Language: English
- Series: Sir John Fielding, #11
- Genre: Historical Crime novel
- Publisher: Putnam
- Publication date: 2005
- Publication place: United States
- Media type: Print (Hardcover, Paperback)
- Pages: 243 pp
- ISBN: 0-399-15242-3
- OCLC: 56615835
- Dewey Decimal: 813/.54 22
- LC Class: PS3553.O55314 R85 2005
- Preceded by: The Price of Murder

Rules of Engagement is the eleventh historical mystery novel about Sir John Fielding by Bruce Alexander (a pseudonym for Bruce Cook). The manuscript was unfinished when Cook died in 2003, but his widow, Judith Aller, and writer John Shannon worked together to complete it.

== Plot summary ==
Sir John and Jeremy are confronted with a series of bizarre deaths (including an unmotivated suicide) on the streets of Georgian London in a mystery that tests even Sir John's legendary skills of deduction. This book ends the series.
