= Graceland Way =

Studio album by Mikaela Davis
- Released: April 24, 2026
- Studio: UHF (Glendale)
- Length: 41:46
- Label: Kill Rock Stars
- Producers: Mikaela Davis; Dan Horne; John Lee Shannon

Mikaela Davis chronology
And Southern Star (2023)	Graceland Way (2026)

Singles from Graceland Way
- 1. "11:11" Released: November 11, 2025; 2. "(Looking Through) Rose Colored Glasses" Released: February 24, 2026

Graceland Way is the fifth studio album by the American singer-songwriter Mikaela Davis, released on April 24, 2026, through Kill Rock Stars. The album was produced by Davis with Dan Horne and John Lee Shannon of Circles Around the Sun, and was recorded at UHF Studio in Glendale, California. Guests on the album include Karly Hartzman (of Wednesday), James Felice (of The Felice Brothers), Madison Cunningham and Tim Heidecker; the latter two appear on the album's second single, "(Looking Through) Rose Colored Glasses".

== Track listing ==
Graceland Way track listing
No.	Title	Writer(s)	Length
1.	"(Looking Through) Rose Colored Glasses" (featuring Madison Cunningham)	Mikaela Davis; John Lee Shannon	3:35
2.	"Nothin's on the Radio"	Davis; Shannon	5:17
3.	"11:11"	Davis; Shannon	4:30
4.	"Wild Flower"	Davis; Núria Graham; Shannon	4:04
5.	"Mizmoon"	Cass McCombs	3:34
6.	"Starlite Tonite"	Davis; Shannon	5:31
7.	"Junk Love"	Davis; Shannon	4:07
8.	"The Wrong Way"	Davis; Shannon	3:41
9.	"Spring Petals in the Snow"	Davis	3:41
10.	"(That's Not) Who I Wanna Be"	Davis; Shannon	3:46
Total length:			41:46

== Personnel ==
Credits are adapted from Tidal.

- Mikaela Davis – vocals, production (all tracks); keyboards (tracks 1–3, 5, 6), harp (1, 3–8), synthesizer (3, 6), percussion (3), Omnichord (7), piano (9, 10)
- Dan Horne –production, engineering, mixing (all tracks); bass guitar (1–4, 6–8, 10), percussion (5), vocals (10)
- John Lee Shannon – production (all tracks), guitar (1–4, 6–8, 10), vocals (10)
- Blade Baker – engineering
- Ian Sefchick – mastering
- Austin Beede – drums (1–4, 6, 8, 10)
- Kurt G. Johnson – engineering (1, 5, 6, 9), pedal steel guitar (1, 6, 8), guitar (3)
- Andres Renteria – percussion (1, 4, 5)
- Clay Finch – vocals (1, 10)
- Madison Cunningham – vocals (1)
- Tim Heidecker – vocals (1)
- Drew Manne – engineering (2, 6)
- Neal Francis – organ, engineering (2)
- Josh Adams – drums (5, 7)
- Hannah Read – violin (5), fiddle (10)
- Shane McCarthy – bass guitar (5)
- Frank LoCrasto – synthesizer (6), keyboards (8)
- Karly Hartzman – vocals (7)
- James Felice – accordion (9)
