= Jack, Knave and Fool =

1998 novel by Bruce Alexander

- First edition
- Author: Bruce Alexander
- Language: English
- Series: Sir John Fielding, #5
- Genre: Historical Crime novel
- Publisher: Putnam
- Publication date: 1998
- Publication place: United States
- Media type: Print (Hardcover, Paperback)
- Pages: 279 pp
- ISBN: 0-399-14419-6
- OCLC: 38765075
- Dewey Decimal: 813/.54 21
- LC Class: PS3553.O55314 J34 1998
- Preceded by: Person or Persons Unknown
- Followed by: Death of a Colonial

Jack, Knave and Fool is the fifth historical mystery novel about Sir John Fielding by Bruce Alexander.

== Plot summary ==
Sir John treats his household to a performance of Händel's music, but murder introduces a discordant note. Meanwhile, a runaway reprobate and a bodiless head present other problems to the magistrate.
