= An Experiment in Treason =

2002 novel by Bruce Alexander

An Experiment In Treason
- Author: Bruce Cook (writing as Bruce Alexander)
- Language: English
- Series: Sir John Fielding, #9
- Genre: Historical Crime novel
- Publisher: Putnam
- Publication date: 2002
- Publication place: United States
- Media type: Print (Hardcover, Paperback)
- Pages: 288 pp
- ISBN: 0-399-14923-6
- OCLC: 49625327
- Dewey Decimal: 813/.54 21
- LC Class: PS3553.O55314 E97 2002
- Preceded by: Smuggler's Moon
- Followed by: The Price of Murder

An Experiment In Treason is the ninth historical mystery novel about Sir John Fielding by Bruce Alexander (a pseudonym for Bruce Cook).

== Plot summary ==
A pack of confidential letters is stolen from the Secretary of State for the American Colonies. With cross-Atlantic tensions rising, Sir John is ordered to interrogate the American representative in London, one Benjamin Franklin.
