= Smuggler's Moon =

2001 novel by Bruce Alexander

- Author: Bruce Cook (writing as Bruce Alexander)
- Language: English
- Series: Sir John Fielding, #8
- Genre: Historical Crime novel
- Publisher: Putnam
- Publication date: 2001
- Publication place: United States
- Media type: Print (Hardcover, Paperback)
- Pages: 304 pp
- ISBN: 0-399-14774-8
- OCLC: 46671013
- Dewey Decimal: 813/.54 21
- LC Class: PS3553.O55314 S68 2001
- Preceded by: The Color of Death
- Followed by: An Experiment In Treason

Smuggler's Moon is the eighth historical mystery novel about Sir John Fielding by Bruce Alexander (a pseudonym for Bruce Cook).

== Plot summary ==
Sir John and Jeremy are sent to East Anglia to investigate smuggling, but when the smugglers turn to murder, Sir John takes it as a brazen assault on the law.
