= Blind Justice =

Blind Justice may refer to:

- Blind justice (concept), a legal concept regarding the neutrality of the dispensing of justice

== Books ==
- Blind Justice (novel), a 1995 novel by Bruce Alexander
- Blind Justice (comics), is a fictional character appearing in American comic books published by Marvel Comics.
- Blind Justice, a story featuring Batman, and first appearance of fictional character Henri Ducard, written by Sam Hamm for Detective Comics #598-#600 (March 1989-May 1989)

== Films ==
- Blind Justice (1916 film), a Danish film
- Blind Justice (1934 film), a British film
- Blind Justice (1961 film)
- Blind Justice (1986 film)
- Blind Justice (1988 film)
- Blind Justice (1994 film), an American HBO TV-movie starring Armand Assante

== Television ==
- Blind Justice (1988 BBC TV series), created by Helena Kennedy
- Blind Justice (TV series), a 2005 ABC television series
- "Blind Justice" (Heartbeat), a 2001 episode

== See also ==
- Justice
- Lady Justice, goddess and personification of justice, often portrayed as wearing a blindfold
