= Murder in Grub Street =

1995 historical mystery novel by Bruce Alexander

Blind Justice
- First edition
- Author: Bruce Alexander
- Language: English
- Series: Sir John Fielding, #2
- Genre: Historical Crime novel
- Publication date: 1995
- Publication place: United States
- Media type: Print (Hardcover, Paperback)
- Pages: 276 pp
- ISBN: 0-425-15550-1
- OCLC: 35809951
- Preceded by: Blind Justice
- Followed by: Watery Grave

Murder in Grub Street is the second historical mystery novel about Sir John Fielding by Bruce Alexander.

== Plot summary ==
A printer and his household are horrifically slaughtered, and a mad poet is caught red-handed at the scene. But Sir John doubts that the real culprit has been found.
