= Person or Persons Unknown (novel) =

1998 novel by Bruce Alexander

- First edition
- Author: Bruce Alexander
- Language: English
- Series: Sir John Fielding, #4
- Genre: Historical Crime novel
- Publication date: 1998
- Publication place: United States
- Media type: Print (Hardcover, Paperback)
- Pages: 336 pp
- ISBN: 0-425-16566-3
- OCLC: 39982989
- Preceded by: Watery Grave
- Followed by: Jack, Knave and Fool

Person or Persons Unknown is the fourth historical mystery novel about Sir John Fielding by Bruce Alexander.

== Plot summary ==
Women of the street are being brutally murdered in Covent Garden, and Sir John is baffled. Worse, one of the Fieldings' acquaintances becomes the prime suspect.
