= The Price of Murder =

- Author: Bruce Cook (writing as Bruce Alexander)
- Language: English
- Series: Sir John Fielding, #10
- Genre: Historical Crime novel
- Publisher: Putnam
- Publication date: 2003
- Publication place: United States
- Media type: Print (Hardcover, Paperback)
- Pages: 257 pp
- ISBN: 0-399-15078-1
- OCLC: 51848652
- Dewey Decimal: 813/.54 21
- LC Class: PS3553.O55314 P75 2003
- Preceded by: An Experiment in Treason
- Followed by: The Rules of Engagement

The Price of Murder is the tenth historical mystery novel about Sir John Fielding by Bruce Alexander (a pseudonym for Bruce Cook).

== Plot summary ==
Sir John and Jeremy are drawn deep into the notorious Seven Dials area of London, where they must contend with the most sordid inclinations of both the working class and the aristocracy. When the body of a young girl is pulled from the Thames, the search for the girl's mother takes Jeremy to the races.

== See also ==
- A subplot is based on the notorious case of Elizabeth Canning.
