= Death of a Colonial =

1999 novel by Bruce Alexander

- First edition
- Author: Bruce Cook (writing as Bruce Alexander)
- Language: English
- Series: Sir John Fielding, #6
- Genre: Historical crime novel
- Publisher: Putnam
- Publication date: 1999
- Publication place: United States
- Media type: Print (Hardcover, Paperback)
- Pages: 275 pp
- ISBN: 0-399-14564-8
- OCLC: 41049502
- Dewey Decimal: 813/.54 21
- LC Class: PS3553.O55314 D45 1999
- Preceded by: Jack, Knave and Fool
- Followed by: The Color of Death

Death of a Colonial is the sixth historical mystery novel about Sir John Fielding by Bruce Alexander (a pseudonym for Bruce Cook).

== Plot summary ==
A nobleman, last of his line, is executed and the crown prepares to seize his property. But a claimant to the estate appears, ostensibly from the American colonies, and Sir John is asked to investigate the validity of his claim.
