= The Demoniacs (novel) =

1962 novel by John Dickson Carr

- First edition (US)
- Author: John Dickson Carr
- Language: English
- Genre: Mystery, detective novel, historical novel
- Publisher: Hamish Hamilton (UK) & Harper (US)
- Publication date: 1962
- Publication place: United Kingdom
- Media type: Print (hardback & paperback)
- Pages: 238 pp (1st US)

The Demoniacs, first published in 1962, is a detective story/historical novel by John Dickson Carr set in the London of 1757. This novel is considered a historical mystery.

== Plot summary ==
Handsome young Jeffrey Wynne has just rescued pretty young Peg Ralston from a "fate worse than death"; she thought she was going to attend a French acting school, but soon learns that it is the "school for the French King's private brothel". Wynne was hired by Peg's father Sir Mortimer Ralston to retrieve her, possibly without the knowledge of Sir Mortimer's mistress, Lavinia Cresswell (and her brother, dangerous swordsman Hamnet Tawnish), who would like nothing better than to see Peg put in Bedlam. Wynne's ordinary job is somewhat similar; he is a thief-taker under the direction of Sir John Fielding, a real-life personage who was in charge of the Bow Street Runners despite his blindness. Wynne and young Miss Ralston soon become involved in the mysterious murder of an ancient bawd who lives on London Bridge; the old woman seems to have no mark of violence upon her body, but what might be a fortune in jewels is missing. The investigation of the crime leads Wynne through the heights and depths of society, including a bagnio in Covent Garden and a drinking bout with Laurence Sterne, until he perceives the well-hidden truth and solves the crime.
