= Watery Grave (novel) =

1996 novel by Bruce Alexander Cook

- First edition
- Author: Bruce Alexander
- Language: English
- Series: Sir John Fielding, #3
- Genre: Historical Crime novel
- Publisher: Putnam
- Publication date: 1996
- Publication place: United States
- Media type: Print (Hardcover, Paperback)
- Pages: 265 pp
- ISBN: 0-399-14155-3
- Preceded by: Murder in Grub Street
- Followed by: Person or Persons Unknown

Watery Grave is the third historical mystery novel about Sir John Fielding by Bruce Alexander.

== Plot summary ==
When the captain of a British warship falls overboard and drowns, a Naval court martial is convened to investigate a charge of murder. Sir John is petitioned by an old friend to aid in the investigation.
