= Maigret and Monsieur Charles =

1972 detective novel by Georges Simenon

- First edition
- Author: Georges Simenon
- Original title: Maigret et Monsieur Charles
- Translator: Marianne Alexandre Sinclair
- Language: French
- Series: Inspector Jules Maigret
- Release number: 75
- Genre: Detective fiction
- Publisher: Presses de la Cité
- Publication date: 1972
- English publication date: 1973
- Media type: Print
- Pages: 189
- Preceded by: Maigret and the Informer

Maigret and Monsieur Charles (French: Maigret et Monsieur Charles) is a 1972 detective novel by the Belgian writer Georges Simenon, and the last featuring his long-running character Jules Maigret. It was written in Épalinges, Switzerland in February 1972 and published 11 February 1972.

== Synopsis ==
Maigret will retire in a few years and has refused promotion to the post of Head of the Police Judiciare, since he prefers the human contact and enjoys working as Head of the Criminal Division. His wish is granted when Madam Nathalie Sabin-Levesque insists he personally investigate the disappearance of her husband Gérard, a successful and rich Parisian lawyer. He is thus once more operating in high society.

With the assistance of various other detectives, but principally Lapointe, Maigret soon discovers that Madam Sabin-Levesque is virtual alcoholic who has lived a separate life from her husband, who regularly vanishes for days or weeks to take up with a plethora of women. (These are mostly hostesses whom he picks up in bars and cabarets, including the Cric-Crac; he is known to them only as 'Monsieur Charles'.) It further emerges that his wife was also a call-girl in her youth, albeit with the higher status cover story of being a legal secretary. She hoped for a life of comfort and security with her new husband, had inherited money and who owns a villa in Cannes, but they soon grew to despise one another. She knows nothing of his professional life and is not well liked by the staff at the practice.

When Gérard's body is fished out of the Seine, Maigret's suspicions naturally fall on her. But it turns out that she is being blackmailed by pimp-turned-barman-turned-gigolo Jo Fazio. It was he who killed Gérard –whereupon she kills him in turn. Maigret somewhat reluctantly arrests Nathalie, knowing that she is in poor health and will spend her time in the prison hospital.

== Publication history ==
The French title was first published in 1972.

The first English version appeared in 1973, translated by Marianne Alexandre Sinclair as Maigret and Monsieur Charles and published by Hamish Hamilton.

== Adaptations ==
=== Television ===
- Jean Richard, Dir. Jean-Paul Sassy, Antenne 2, 4 June 1977
- Kinya Aikawa, Dir. Akira Inoue, 警視と最後の事件 (Last Case), ABC, 29 September 1978
