= Walter Jokisch =

German actor (1914–1984)

- Born: 9 December 1914; Breslau, Silesia, German Empire
- Died: 23 February 1984 (aged 69); Munich, Bavaria, West Germany
- Occupation: Actor
- Years active: 1960-1984 (film & TV)

Walter Jokisch (1914–1984) was a German stage, radio and television actor.

== Filmography ==
Year	Title	Role	Notes
1963	Tim Frazer	Norman Gibson	4 episodes
1963	Das Glück läuft hinterher	Gustav Eifert	
1966	Zwei wie wir... und die Eltern wissen von nichts	Direktor Walter	
1968	Detektiv Quarles	Inspector Leeds	3 episodes
1970	Die Kriminalnovelle	Inspektor Parkinson	3 episodes
1973	Die Kriminalerzählung	Inspektor Parkinson	8 episodes
1975	Die Stadt im Tal	Stadtrat Leichner	
1978	Die schöne Marianne	Marianne's Vater	Episode: "Die Leute aus dem Wald"
1979-1980	Timm Thaler	Abbé Johannes	4 episodes
1979-1981	Doctor Snuggles	Doctor Snuggles	13 episodes, German version, Voice
1984	The Blind Judge	Sam Johnson	13 episodes

== Bibliography ==
- Alexander Schouvaloff & Victor Borovsky. Stravinsky on Stage. Stainer & Bell, 1982.
