= Bruce Alexander Cook =

American novelist (1932–2003)

Bruce Alexander Cook (1932 – November 9, 2003) was an American journalist and author who also wrote under the pseudonym Bruce Alexander, creating historical novels about a blind 18th-century Englishman and also a 20th-century Mexican-American detective.

== Biography ==
Cook was born in 1932 in Chicago. His family moved often as a child, his father being a train dispatcher with frequent new assignments. He earned a degree in literature from Loyola University Chicago.

His first wife was Catherine Coghlan, with whom he had three children, Catherine (Katy), Bob, and Ceci. He married concert violinist Judith Aller in 1994.

He served as a translator in the U.S. Army in Frankfurt, Germany, in the late 1950s, and also did public relations work. He joined the editorial staff of the National Observer in Washington D.C. in 1967, and covered movies, books, and music. When that newspaper folded, he became book editor of USA Today, the Detroit News, and then the Los Angeles Daily News (from 1984 to 1990). He was a senior editor at Newsweek. In the meantime, he was writing as a free-lance, selling to such publications as the National Catholic Reporter.

He died of a stroke November 9, 2003, in Hollywood Presbyterian Medical Center, Hollywood, California.

== Books ==
Cook's first book was a nonfiction work, The Beat Generation, published by Charles Scribner's Sons in 1971. A biography of screenwriter Dalton Trumbo followed in 1977, and in 2015 it was made into a film by the same name. His first novel was Chicago-based Sex Life, in 1978.

He wrote four novels featuring Los Angeles detective Antonio "Chico" Cervantes — Mexican Standoff, 1988, Rough Cut, 1990, Death as a Career Move, 1992, and Sidewalk Hilton, 1994. He also wrote a series of novels about the blind magistrate Sir John Fielding, the real-life founder of London's first police force.

His later nonfiction works were Listen to the Blues, a musical history, in 1973; Brecht in Exile, about the German writer Bertold Brecht, in 1983; and The Town That Country Built: Welcome to Branson, Missouri, in 1993. His final books, published posthumously, were Young Will: The Confessions of William Shakespeare and a Fielding book, Rules of Engagement, for which his widow and writer John Shannon put on the finishing touches.

== Bibliography ==
- Blind Justice (1994)
- Murder in Grub Street (1995)
- Watery Grave (1996)
- Person or Persons Unknown (1997)
- Jack, Knave and Fool (1998)
- Death of a Colonial (1999)
- The Color of Death (2000)
- Smuggler's Moon (2001)
- An Experiment in Treason (2002)
- The Price of Murder (2003)
- Rules of Engagement (2005), posthumously published
