= Mikaela Davis =

American musician

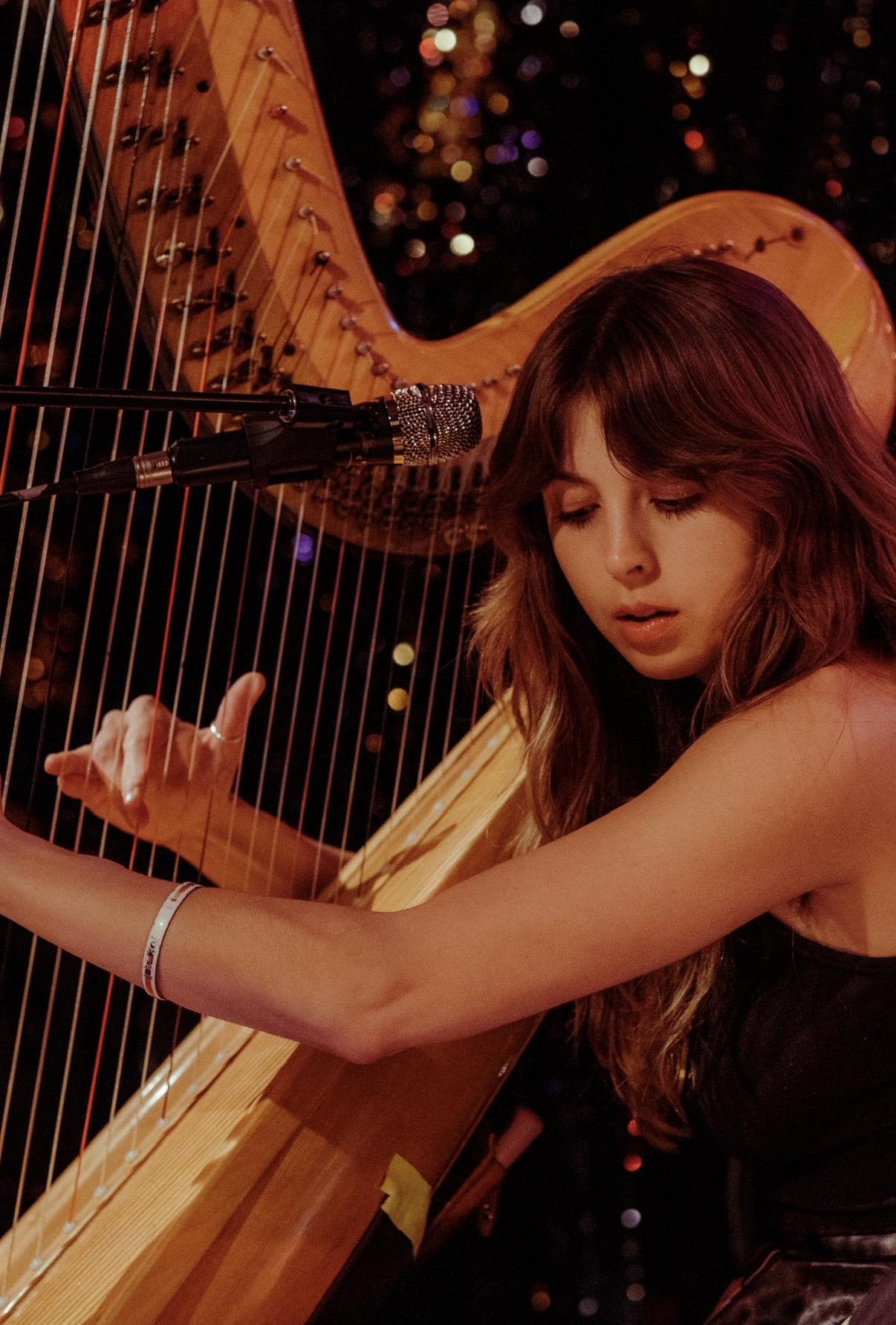
- Davis performing in 2023

Background information
- Born: Rochester, NY, U.S.
- Genres: Indie, alt-country, rock
- Occupations: Harpist, vocalist, songwriter, producer
- Instruments: Harp, vocals, piano
- Years active: 2012–present
- Labels: Kill Rock Stars, Rounder
- Website: Official website

Mikaela Davis (born April 9, 1992) is an American singer, songwriter, and harpist. Pitchfork described her music as "rugged alt-country, twangy roots rock, paisley-bedecked Laurel Canyon psychedelia, and jam-band choogle, always staying anchored in the interplay between the stringed instruments."

== Education ==
Davis is a classically trained harpist and studied at the Crane School of Music.

== Recognition ==
The 2023 release And Southern Star was well received with Pitchfork calling it "stirring" with "warm, inviting songs". Glide Magazine recognized And Southern Star as one of the top 20 indie records of 2023 and called it "pure artistry".

== Discography ==
- Mikaela Davis (2012)
- Fortune Teller (2014)
- Delivery (2018)
- And Southern Star (2023)
- Graceland Way (2026)

== Associated acts ==
- Bob Weir
- Phil Lesh
- Grateful Shred
- Circles Around the Sun
- The Decemberists
- Christian McBride
- Marco Benevento
