= Sabine von Maydell =

German actress

- Born: 9 October 1955 (age 69); Baden-Baden, West Germany
- Occupation: Actress
- Spouse: Claude-Oliver Rudolph (m. 1984; div. 2014)
- Children: 2
- Website: Official website

Sabine von Maydell (born 9 October 1955) is a German television actress. From October 1984 to March 2014, she was married to actor Claude-Oliver Rudolph. She has a son and a daughter, Oona von Maydell, who is also an actress.

== Selected filmography ==
- Derrick - Season 3, Episode 2: "Tod der Trompeters" (1976)
- Disorder and Early Torment (1977)
- Derrick - Season 4, Episode 3: "Eine Nacht im Oktober" (1977)
- Derrick - Season 6, Episode 12: "Ein Todesengel" (1979)
- Beware of Schwarzenbeck (1979)
- Wir (1982) (based on We, the 1921 Russian novel by Yevgeny Zamyatin)
- Ebbie's Bluff (1993)
