= William Russell (fiction writer) =

19th century English writer

William Russell (1806–1876) was an English writer in the 19th century, producing works of fiction. He is considered among the first and most prolific authors to write 'police memoirs' or detective stories (some published under the pseudonym 'Waters' or 'Thomas Waters'). He also wrote nautical adventures (under the pseudonym 'Lieutenant Warneford, R. N.'), and legal stories. He, or his publishers, may have capitalised upon the similarity of his name to his contemporary, Times journalist William Howard Russell.

Russell is thought to have been born in Southampton in 1806, and in the late 1840s started contributing an irregular series of stories to Chambers's Edinburgh Journal between 1849 and 1852. He also contributed to The London Journal, St. James's Magazine, and The Sixpenny Magazine.

Ten of Russell's Chambers detective stories were subsequently published in unauthorised editions in New York in 1852 and 1853, entitled The Recollections of a Policeman. The same ten, plus two additional stories, were then collated into a volume entitled Recollections of a Detective Police-Officer, published in London in 1856 (also reprinted with slightly different titles). A further volume with eight additional stories followed in 1859. A collection of his sea stories appeared in Tales of the Coast Guard (also 1856), and Leaves from the Diary of a Law Clerk was published in 1857. Among other works, Autobiography of an English Detective was published in two volumes in 1863.

Married to Eliza, he lived at various times in Stoke Newington, Hackney and Islington, and may also have returned to live in Southampton.

== Works ==
The following is a list of Russell's published works.

- Recollections of a Detective Police-Officer (1856)
- Tales of the Coast Guard (1856)
- The Marriage Settlement and The Rose of Corail (1856)
- The Experiences of a Barrister (1856)
- Leaves from the Diary of a Law-Clerk (1857)
- The Game of Life (1857)
- Kirke Webbe, the Privateer Captain (1858)
- The Serf Girl of Moscow (1858)
- Recollections of a Detective Police-Officer, Second Series (1859)
- A Skeleton in Every House (1860)
- Tales of the Slave Squadron (1860)
- Two Love Stories: An Anglo-Spanish Romance (1861)
- The Experiences of a French Detective Officer (1861)
- The Heir-at-Law, and Other Tales (1861)
- The Romance of Common Life (1861)
- Experiences of a Real Detective (1862)
- Undiscovered Crimes (1862)
- The Cruise of the Blue Jacket and Other Sea Stories (1862)
- Romance of the Seas (1862)
- Autobiography of an English Detective (1863)
- Running the Blockade (1863)
- Secrets of My Office (1863)
- The Jolly Boat: or, Perils and Disasters Illustrating Courage, Endurance, and Heroism (1865)
- Skedaddle (1865)
- The Phantom Cruiser (1865)
- Leaves from the Journal of a Custom-House Officer (1868)
- The Confidential Adviser: or, Fighting Against Odds (1868)
- Charles Oldfield: The Autobiography of a Staff Officer (1868)
- Recollections of a Sheriff's Officer (1870)
- Jack Thurlow and I: or, How Will it End? A Story of Life, Love, and Adventure (1871)
- Autobiography of an Italian Police-Officer (1880)
- Hearts are Trumps: or, Recollections of the English Peasantry (1883)
