= Midnight in Saint Petersburg =

1996 film by Douglas Jackson

- Genre: Thriller
- Based on: Characters by Len Deighton
- Screenplay by: Peter Welbeck
- Directed by: Douglas Jackson
- Starring: Michael Caine; Jason Connery; Michelle Rene Thomas; Michael Gambon; Michael Sarrazin; Tanya Jackson
- Music by: Rick Wakeman
- Countries of origin: Canada; United Kingdom; Russia
- Original language: English

Production
- Executive producer: Harry Alan Towers
- Producers: Edward Simons; Kent Walwin; Aleksandr Golutva; John Dunning; André Link
- Production locations: Montréal; St. Petersburg, Russia
- Cinematography: Peter Benison
- Editor: Vidal Beique
- Running time: 86 minutes
- Production companies: Quebec 3099-3018; Harry Palmer Productions; Lenfilm

Original release
- Network: Showtime
- Release: 14 February 1996

Related
- Bullet to Beijing (1995)

Midnight in Saint Petersburg is a 1996 made-for-television thriller film starring Michael Caine for the fifth and final time as British secret agent Harry Palmer.

It served as a sequel to Bullet to Beijing, which had been released the year before, the two films having been shot back-to-back. Three previous films featuring Caine as Palmer were released in the 1960s, beginning with The Ipcress File.

== Plot ==
Harry Palmer heads a private investigation business based in Moscow. His associates are Nikolai "Nick" Petrov, ex-CIA agent Craig, and ex-KGB Colonel Gradsky.). They take on the job of finding 1000 grams of weapons-grade plutonium stolen from the Russian government, though they do not know the identity of their client.

This leads Harry back to Saint Petersburg, where (in Bullet to Beijing) he managed to make enemies of both of the leading rival gangsters, Alex and Yuri. Nonetheless, suspecting that Alex is involved, Harry talks Yuri into helping him.

As a complication, Nick's ballerina girlfriend Tatiana is kidnapped by a gang working for Alex in order to pressure her father, the head curator of the Hermitage Museum, into helping steal valuable artwork for crooked art dealer Dr. Vestry. Also in the mix is reporter Brandy, who turns out to be working for Alex, too. Nick is captured when he goes looking for Tatiana, but manages to escape in time to assist Harry, with Yuri's help, to foil both schemes.

== Cast ==
- Michael Caine as Harry Palmer
- Jason Connery as Nikolai Petrov
- Yuri Limonty as Circus Clown
- Tanya Jackson as Tatiana Zavarzina
- Michael Scherer as Mafiosa
- Michelle Burke as Brandy
- Gabriel Vorobyov as Driver
- Michael Sarrazin as Craig Warner
- Michael Gambon as Alexei Alexeyevich
- Lev Prygunov as Colonel Gradsky
- Olga Anokhina as Greta
- Yuriy Petrov as General Kornikov
- Anatoli Davydov as Yuri Stephanovich
- Serge Houde as Dr. Armand Vestry
- Ingolf Gorges as Club Manager
- Evgeny Zharikov as Feodor Zavarzin
- Vera Bykova-Pizhel as Maria Zavarzina
- Vladimir Yeryomin as Boris
- John Dunn-Hill as Louis
- Vlasta Vrana as Hans Schreiber
- Mia Sara as Natasha Gradskaya
