= The Blind Judge =

- Genre: Crime drama
- Written by: Günter Kunert
- Directed by: Vojtěch Jasný
- Starring: Franz Josef Steffens; Joachim Dietmar Mues
- Country of origin: West Germany
- Original language: German
- No. of series: 1
- No. of episodes: 13

Production
- Producer: Peter von Zahn
- Running time: 25 minutes
- Production company: Windrose Film- und Fernsehproduktion

Original release
- Network: ARD
- Release: 19 September – 15 December 1984

The Blind Judge (German: Der blinde Richter) is a 1984 West German historical crime television series broadcast on ARD in thirteen episodes. It is based on the career of the eighteenth century British magistrate John Fielding.

== Main cast ==
- Franz Josef Steffens as Sir John Fielding
- Gert Schaefer as Henry Fielding
- Rainer Schmitt as Saunder Welch
- Joachim Dietmar Mues as William Hogarth
- Walter Jokisch as Sam Johnson
- Ingolf Gorges as David Garrick
- Wolfgang Kaven as Patrick

== Bibliography ==
- Apropos, Film: das Jahrbuch der DEFA-Stiftung. Verlag Das Neue Berlin, 2003.
