= Joachim Dietmar Mues =

German actor (1945–2011)

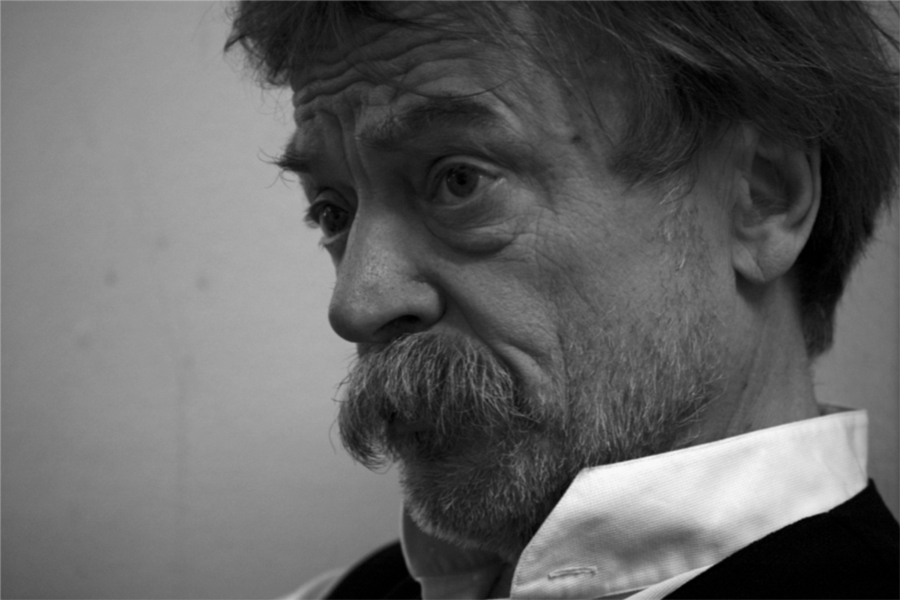
- Born: 21 December 1945; Dresden, Germany
- Died: 12 March 2011 (aged 65); Hamburg, Germany
- Occupation: Actor
- Years active: 1970-2012 (film & TV)

Joachim Dietmar Mues (1945–2011) was a German stage, film and television actor.

== Filmography ==
Year	Title	Role	Notes
1974	The Odessa File	Wehrmacht Captain	
1978	Feuer um Mitternacht	Theo Bank	
1981	Circle of Deceit	Editor	
1982	We	Erster Arzt	TV movie
1982	The Axe of Wandsbek	Footh	TV movie
1984	The Blind Judge	William Hogarth	13 episodes
1984	Haus im Süden	Robert	
1985	Betrogen	Gerhard	
1986	Runaway Horse	Klaus Buch	TV movie
1987	Lethal Obsession	Salz	
1992	Thea und Nat	Max Schrader	
1995	Der große Abgang	Jakob Glinz	TV movie
1995	Schlaraffenland	Hannes	
1996	Erhöhte Waldbrandgefahr	Mario Massa	
1996	Conversation with the Beast	Heinrich Pfarmann	
1998	Solo for Clarinet	Georg Steinmann	
1999	Gangster		
1999	'Ne günstige Gelegenheit	Georg Rübenacker	
2008	Up! Up! To the Sky	Professor Borgmann	

== Bibliography ==
- Charles P. Mitchell. The Hitler Filmography: Worldwide Feature Film and Television Miniseries Portrayals, 1940 through 2000. McFarland, 2002.
