= Ingolf Gorges =

German actor and voice actor (1940–2008)

- Born: 8 April 1940; Magdeburg, Germany
- Died: 24 May 2008 (aged 68); Berlin, Germany
- Occupation: Actor
- Years active: 1959-1997 (film & TV)

Ingolf Gorges (1940–2008) was a German stage, film and television actor. Based in East Germany, he appeared in a number of DEFA films during the 1960s.

== Selected filmography ==
- Love's Confusion (1959)
- Das Leben beginnt (1960)
- Streng geheim (1963)
- Pension Boulanka (1964)
- Ways across the Country (1968, TV series)
- Rendezvous mit Unbekannt (1969, TV series)
- Die Toten bleiben jung (1969, TV series)
- Anflug Alpha I (1971)
- The Blind Judge (1984, TV series)
- The Black Forest Clinic (1985, TV series)
- Detektivbüro Roth (1986, TV series)
- Bullet to Beijing (1995)
- Midnight in Saint Petersburg (1996)
- The Secret of Sagal (1997, TV series)

== Bibliography ==
- John Cunningham. The Cinema of Istvan Szabo: Visions of Europe. Columbia University Press, 2014.
- Manfred Wekwerth. Daring to Play: A Brecht Companion. Routledge, 2012.
