= We (1982 film) =

- Film Poster
- Based on: We Yevgeni Zamyatin (as Jewgenij Samjatin)
- Written by: Claus Hubalek
- Directed by: Vojtěch Jasný
- Starring: Dieter Laser; Sabine von Maydell; Gert Haucke; Joachim Dietmar Mues
- Music by: Jan Novák
- Country of origin: Germany
- Original language: German

Production
- Producer: German TV network ZDF
- Cinematography: Martin Strauß; Norbert Zinkand
- Running time: 98 minutes

Original release
- Network: ZDF
- Release: 1982

We (German: Wir) is a 1982 German science fiction film written by Claus Hubalek, directed by Vojtěch Jasný and produced by German TV network ZDF. The film presents a world of harmony and conformity within a united state of technocratic progressivism. It is based on the 1921 novel We by the Russian writer Yevgeny Zamyatin.

== Plot ==
One thousand years after the One State's conquest of the entire world, the spaceship Integral is being built in order to spread the state's supposedly proven recipe for justice and happiness for all to other planets. Meanwhile, the project's chief engineer, D-503, begins a diary that he intends to be carried on the completed spaceship.

== Cast ==
- Dieter Laser as D-503
- Sabine von Maydell as I-330
- Gert Haucke as S-4710
- Joachim Dietmar Mues as Erster Arzt
- Susanne Altschul as O-90
- Giovanni Früh as R-13
- Wolfgang Kaven as D-504
- Dieter G. Knichel as Zweiter Arzt
- Kurt Lambrigger as Delinquent
- Marga Maasberg as Altes Weib
- Heinz Moog as Wohltäter
- Hanna Ruess as U-27

== See also ==
- The Glass Fortress, a 2016 film based on the same novel
