= Lethal Obsession =

1987 film

- Directed by: Peter Patzak
- Written by: Jonathan Carroll; Peter Patzak
- Produced by: Karl Spiehs; Horst Hächler
- Starring: Peter Maffay; Michael York; Armin Mueller-Stahl; Elliott Gould
- Cinematography: Dietrich Lohmann; Igor Luther
- Music by: Frank Diez; Peter Maffay; Carl Carlton; Tony Carey
- Production companies: CTV 72 Film und Fernsehproduktion; Lisa Film
- Distributed by: Tivoli Film
- Release date: 15 October 1987
- Country: West Germany
- Languages: German; English; Italian

Lethal Obsession (German: Der Joker, also known as The Joker) is a 1987 German crime-thriller film written and directed by Peter Patzak and starring Peter Maffay, Tahnee Welch, Michael York, Armin Mueller-Stahl, Elliott Gould, and Massimo Ghini.

== Cast ==
- Peter Maffay as Jan Bogdan
- Tahnee Welch as Daniela Santini
- Michael York as Dr. Proper
- Armin Mueller-Stahl as Axel Baumgartner
- Elliott Gould as Serge Gart
- Joachim Dietmar Mues as Salz
- Massimo Ghini as Toni Blach
- Karl Merkatz as Josef Blach
- Monica Bleibtreu as Cilly
- Werner Pochath as Resch
- Marquard Bohm as Pfeffer
