= List of Ace mystery letter-series single titles =

Ace Books have published hundreds of mystery titles, starting in 1952. Most of these were Ace Doubles (dos-à-dos format), but they also published a few single volumes. Between 1952 and 1968, the books had a letter-series identifier; after that date they were given five digit numeric serial numbers. There were a total of 17 letter-series mystery titles.

The list given here gives a date of publication; in all cases this refers to the date of publication by Ace, and not the date of original publication of the novels. For more information about the history of these titles, see Ace Books, which includes a discussion of the serial numbering conventions used and an explanation of the letter-code system.

== D and S Series ==
- S-083 MY Arnold Drake The Steel Noose (1954)
- S-097 MY Norman Hershman (as Norman Herries) Death Has 2 Faces (1955)
- D-411 MY Bob McKnight Swamp Sanctuary

== G Series ==
- G-510 MY Charlotte Armstrong Lewi (as Charlotte Armstrong) The Case Of The Weird Sisters (1965)
- G-514 MY Charlotte Armstrong Lewi (as Charlotte Armstrong) Something Blue
- G-540 MY Charlotte Armstrong Lewi (as Charlotte Armstrong) A Little Less Than Kind (1965)
- G-546 MY Helen Reilly Compartment K (1965)
- G-548 MY Rohan O'Grady Let's Kill Uncle (1965)
- G-549 MY Ursula Curtiss The Iron Cobweb (1965)
- G-555 MY Ursula Curtiss The Wasp (1963)
- G-557 MY Ursula Curtiss Out of the Dark
- G-561 MY Ursula Curtiss Widow's Web (1965)
- G-565 MY Ursula Curtiss The Deadly Climate (1965)

== H Series ==
- H-61 MY Elizabeth Salter Death In A Mist (1968)
- H-80 MY Margaret Summerton (as Jan Roffman) With Murder In Mind (1968)
- H-93 MY Delano Ames The Man in the Tricorn Hat
- H-97 MY Delano Ames The Man With Three Jaguars
