= List of Ace mystery numeric-series single titles =

Ace Books have published hundreds of mystery titles, starting in 1952. Most of these were Ace Doubles (dos-à-dos format), but they also published a few single volumes. Between 1952 and 1968, the books had a letter-series identifier; after that date they were given five digit numeric serial numbers. There were a total of 17 number-series mystery titles.

The list given here gives a date of publication; in all cases this refers to the date of publication by Ace, and not the date of original publication of the novels. For more information about the history of these titles, see Ace Books, which includes a discussion of the serial numbering conventions used and an explanation of the letter-code system.

- 02276 MY Philip Loraine The Angel Of Death
- 06505 MY Cornell Woolrich The Black Angel (1965)
- 07921 MY Cornell Woolrich Bride Wore Black
- 14153 MY Cornell Woolrich (as William Irish) Deadline at Dawn
- 14165 MY John Holbrook Vance (as Jack Vance) The Deadly Isles
- 22680 MY Hershatter Fallout For A Spy
- 24975 MY Jack Vance (as John Holbrook Vance) The Fox Valley Murders (1968)
- 31725 MY Shirley Jackson Hangsaman
- 36300 MY Ron Goulart If Dying Was All (1971)
- 37598 MY Gil Brewer The Devil In Davos: It Takes A Thief #1 (1969)
- 37599 MY Gil Brewer Mediterranean Caper: It Takes A Thief #2 (1969)
- 37600 MY Gil Brewer Appointment In Cairo: It Takes A Thief #3 (1970)
- 40590 MY Ron Goulart Too Sweet To Die (1972)
- 66050 MY Cornell Woolrich Phantom Lady
- 67110 MY Jack Vance (as John Holbrook Vance) The Pleasant Grove Murder
- 75945 MY Ron Goulart The Same Lie Twice (1973)
- 87718 MY Harlan Ellison Web Of The City (1983)
