= Franz Josef Steffens =

German actor (1923–2006)

- Born: 27 December 1923; Beckum, Germany
- Died: 5 May 2006 (aged 82); Hamburg, Germany
- Occupation: Actor
- Years active: 1962–2005 (film & TV)

Franz Josef Steffens (1923–2006) was a German stage, film and television actor.

== Selected filmography ==
- Die Verrohung des Franz Blum (1974)
- Jerusalem, Jerusalem (1979, TV series)
- The Blind Judge (1984, TV series)
- Moving Targets (1984)
- Das Erbe der Guldenburgs (1987–1990, TV series)
- The Country Doctor (1990, TV series)
- Unsere Hagenbecks (1991–1994, TV series)
- Freunde fürs Leben (1992–1997, TV series)
- Schlaraffenland (1995)
- Für alle Fälle Stefanie (1996, TV series)

== Bibliography ==
- Zeno Ackermann & Sabine Schülting. Precarious Figurations: Shylock on the German Stage, 1920–2010. Walter de Gruyter, 2019
