= Blind Justice (novel) =

1994 novel by Bruce Alexander

- Author: Bruce Alexander
- Language: English
- Series: Sir John Fielding, #1
- Genre: Historical mystery
- Publisher: Putnam
- Publication date: September 15, 1994
- Publication place: United States
- Media type: Print (hardcover, paperback)
- Pages: 254
- ISBN: 978-0399139789
- Preceded by: none
- Followed by: Murder in Grub Street

Blind Justice is a 1994 historical mystery novel by Bruce Alexander. It is Alexander's first novel about Sir John Fielding, organizer of London's first police force.

== Plot summary ==
Young Jeremy Proctor, recently orphaned, is taken in as ward by blind Sir John Fielding, Magistrate of the Bow Street court and organizer of London's first police force. When Sir John investigates the apparent suicide of Lord Goodhope, it is Jeremy's eyes which note the crucial clue.

== Reception ==
Joan Ruddiman thought that both fans of mystery and historical fiction would find something to appreciate. Val McDermid, writing in the Manchester Evening News, opined that the "pedestrian plotting" and "conventional structure" was made up for by the "lively prose and vivid period feel".
