= Judith Aller =

American musician

Judith Aller is an American-born violinist, the daughter of pianist Victor Aller.

Aller started taking lessons on the violin at seven, and as a teenager, she began her studies with Jascha Heifetz in his master class at the University of Southern California. After three years with Heifetz, Aller married a Finnish musician, Ilkka Talvi, and relocated to Finland, residing first in Helsinki and subsequently in Pori. She toured Europe in recital and with the Pori Symphony Orchestra, in which she performed as soloist and served as concertmaster and assistant conductor. From Helsinki she toured as soloist with the Finnish Radio Symphony, made recordings for Finnish radio, and taught at the Sibelius Academy.

The fatal illness of her father brought Aller and her family back to America. In Los Angeles she performed as a principal and frequent soloist with the Los Angeles Chamber Orchestra and the Oregon Bach Festival Orchestra, and played on sound tracks for motion pictures, television productions, and popular music recordings. She first conducted with the Los Angeles Accademia Filarmonica.

After remarrying, she moved to Paris with her husband, Bruce Cook, a novelist whose pen name was Bruce Alexander. While dividing her time between Paris and Los Angeles, Aller recorded "Archangel!" (on the USA Music Group label), a selection of the Opus 5 violin sonatas by the Italian Baroque master, Arcangelo Corelli. These sonatas, which she described "music that exists outside of time," were recorded in a single day. After that recording, Aller returned to England, and soloed on a soundtrack for a film, titled "Maestro," about a violinist. She continued to perform recitals in France with pianists from the Paris Conservatory, and in Los Angeles with the Aller Quartet.
