= Lev Sheinin =

Lev Romanovich Sheinin (Russian: Лев Романович Шейнин, 1906–1967) was a Soviet writer, journalist, and NKVD investigator. He was Andrei Vyshinsky's chief investigator during the show trials of the 1930s, and a member of the Soviet team at the Nuremberg trials. In the 1930s he collaborated with psychologist Alexander Luria in researching the emotional reactions of suspected criminals, work that contributed to the development of polygraph testing. In 1951 he was arrested on suspicion of spying, one of the arrests associated with the Doctors' plot.

He wrote Diary of a Criminologist (1945), one of the first Soviet detective novels, along with many other novels, plays, and short stories. His obituary in the New York Times reported that his plays were produced throughout the Eastern Bloc and Diary of a Criminologist was "considered essential reading for law students." He was a member of the Union of Soviet Writers. He died in 1967 at the age of 61.

== Biography ==
=== Early life ===
He was born in the village of Brusanovka (now Velizhsky district, Smolensk oblast) into a Jewish family that moved to Toropets in 1908. In 1919 he joined the Komsomol and started working in a newspaper. In 1921 he came to Moscow, studied at Higher Literary and Artistic Institute, wanted to become a writer.

=== Career ===
In 1923 he was sent to work in the Prosecutor's Office of the USSR. In 1927 he was transferred to Leningrad, where he worked as a senior investigator in the regional court. In 1929 he joined the All-Union Communist Party of Bolsheviks. In 1931 he was promoted to USSR Prosecutor's Office as an investigator for especially important cases. Published a textbook on criminalistics.

In December 1934 in Leningrad he was Andrey Vyshinsky assistant or deputy; according to contemporaries, he remained loyal to him even in Khrushchev's time. From 1935 he was the head of the investigative department of the USSR Prosecutor's Office, State Counsellor of Justice 2nd class, a member of the Special Council of the NKVD.

In 1936 he was arrested and was imprisoned in a labor camp in Kolyma. After a review of the case he was released and the charges were dropped.

Since 1939 he was again the head of the investigative department of the USSR Prosecutor's Office. Was engaged in the organisation of protection of intelligence officers Mordvinov and Kornilov after their failure in Ankara, contributed to their exchange in the USSR.

In 1945-1946 he participated in the work of the Nuremberg trials, was the assistant to the chief prosecutor from the USSR Roman Rudenko.

In 1949 he was relieved of his post "due to transfer to another job". He was promised the post of Director of the Institute of Criminalistics, but he did not get it.

In 1950 he was awarded the Stalin Prize of the first degree for the script of the film Encounter at the Elbe.

==== Selected cases ====
- In 1930 investigated the collision of a train and a tram in Leningrad.
- In 1934 participated in the investigation of the murder of S. M. Kirov, conducted the last interrogation of the accused Leonid Nikolayev.
- In 1934-1935 he participated in the investigation of the case of the Moscow Centre of Lev Kamenev and Grigory Zinoviev.
- In 1936 he was in charge of the case of polar explorers Semenchuk and Startsev (rehabilitated in 1989).
- In 1937, he headed a special group of prosecutor's office employees involved in the investigation of Bukharin, Rykov and Yagoda.
- In 1943 he was engaged in the case of the Kremlin children, the murder by Vladimir Shakhurin, son of Aleksey Shakhurin, of the daughter of diplomat Konstantin Umansky, after which the secret organisation The Fourth Reich, created by the children of prominent statesmen of the Soviet Union, was uncovered.
- In 1949 investigated the fire at Voroshilov's dacha.

=== Second arrest and later life ===
On 19 October 1951 he was arrested for the second time in the Doctors' plot, was also accused of organising an anti-Soviet group of Jewish nationalists (the Case of the Jewish Anti-Fascist Committee), and was kept in Lubyanka prison.

The case against Sheinin was dismissed on 21 November 1953, the reason given was that the check established that Sheinin had been stipulated.

After 1953 Sheynin was engaged in writing. For several years he was a member of the editorial board and deputy editor-in-chief of the journal Oktyabr. He was a member of the board of the Union of Soviet Writers.

In the 1960s he held the posts of a member of the Art Council of the USSR Ministry of Culture, editor-in-chief of the Mosfilm (until 1964), head of the film commission of the Dramaturgy Council of the USSR Union of Writers.

He died on 11 May 1967 of a heart attack. Buried in Moscow at the Novodevichy Cemetery.

== Selected filmography ==
- Engineer Kochin's Error (1939) – based on the play "Final Bet" by Lev Sheinin and the Tur brothers.
- Encounter at the Elbe (1949) – script written by Lev Sheinin and the Tur brothers.
- Duel (1944) – script written by Lev Sheinin and the Tur brothers.
- The Lark (1965) – the plot of the script written by Scheinin "General Guderian's Mistake" was used.
