= Thomas Adcock =

American novelist

- Born: May 1, 1947 (age 79); Detroit

Thomas Larry Adcock (born May 1, 1947) is a Detroit-born journalist and novelist. He is a winner of an Edgar Allan Poe Award. As U.S. correspondent for CulturMag, a Berlin-based international magazine of art and commentary, he writes on American behavior and politics. His novels and short stories been translated into Japanese, French, Spanish, Italian, German, Swedish, Norwegian, Finnish, Bulgarian and Czech. He began his newspaper career at the Detroit Free Press and has written for the Minneapolis Star-Tribune, Chicago Today, the Toronto Telegram, the New York Law Journal and The New York Times.

Adcock has also worked at a Manhattan advertising agency and taught journalism and creative writing—at Temple University (Philadelphia), New York University, and the New School for Social Research (New York). He has been active in P.E.N. International, the Mystery Writers of America, the Czech Writers Union, and was co-founder of the North American chapter of the International Association of Crime Writers.

He and his wife, the actress and writer Kim Sykes, live in New York City and upstate North Chatham, N.Y. They are activists in progressive causes and political organizations.

== Bibliography ==
=== Nonfiction ===
- Precinct 19 (Doubleday & Co. 1984)

=== Fiction ===
"The Cannibal of Pang Yang" (CulturMag 2012)

- Sea of Green (Mysterious Press 1989)
- Dark Maze (Pocket Books, Simon & Schuster 1991)
- Drown All the Dogs (Pocket Books/S&S 1993)
- Devil's Heaven (Pocket Books, S&S 1994)
- Thrown-Away Child (Pocket Books, S&S 1996)
- Grief Street (Pocket Books, S&S 1997)

=== Anthologies ===
- Murder on the Aisle (1985)
- Mystery for Christmas (1986)
- Thou Shalt Not Kill (1987)
- Merry Murder (1988)
- Bad Behavior (1992)
- Death in Dixie (1997)
- Murder Most Merry (2002)
- New Orleans Noir (2006)
- Bronx Noir (2007)
- Brooklyn Noir/3 (2008)

=== Short stories ===
EQMM = Ellery Queen's Mystery Magazine
AHMM = Alfred Hitchcock's Mystery Magazine

- The Mister's Funeral (EQMM 1985)
- New York, New York (EQMM 1986)
- Christmas Cop (EQMM 1986)
- Thrown-Away Child (EQMM 1986)
- Zero Man (EQMM 1986)
- Cracker Jack (EQMM 1987)
- No Jury Will Ever Hang You (EQMM 1987)
- Smart Sammy Slapman (EQMM Sep 1987)
- The Sixty-Six Cent Divorce (EQMM 1987)
- The Trespass (EQMM 1988)
- The Dark Maze (EQMM 1988)
- The Life of a Big Whale (EQMM 1988)
- The School of Ten Bells (EQMM 1988)
- Shoot Me, I'm Already Dead (EQMM 1989)
- Who Gives This Bride? (EQMM 1989)
- Straight Down the Middle (AHMM 1990)
- A Cool, Clean Shot (AHMM 1992)
- My Dear Dead Dope (EQMM 1992)
- Lawyers' Tongues (Akashic Books 2007)
- You Want I Should Whack Monkey Boy? (Akashic Books 2007)
- The Morgue Boys (Akashic Books 2008)
