= John Shannon (novelist) =

American novelist

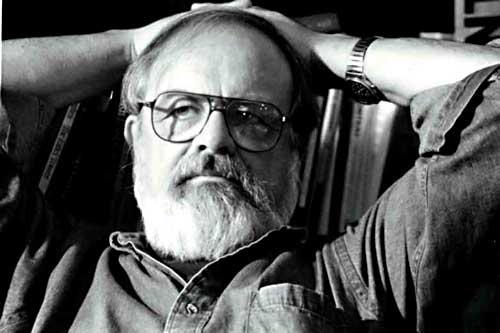
- (2000)
- Born: November 29, 1943 (age 82); Detroit, Michigan, U.S.
- Education: Pomona College (BA); University of California, Los Angeles (MFA)
- Occupations: Novelist, Mystery Writer
- Writing career
- Genres: Fiction, Crime Fiction
- Website: www.jackliffey.com

John Shannon (born November 29, 1943) is a contemporary American author, lately of detective fiction. He began his career with four well-reviewed novels in the 1970s and 1980s, then in 1996 launched the Jack Liffey mystery series. He cites as his literary influences Raymond Chandler, Ross Macdonald, Graham Greene, Robert Stone and Jim Harrison.

== Biography ==
Born in Detroit, Michigan, Shannon moved with his family to San Pedro, the gritty harbor district of Los Angeles, California, when he was five. There he grew up among the children of longshoremen and commercial fishermen. He went to Pomona College where he received a B.A. in literature and then to UCLA where he received an MFA degree in film.

After completing his film degree, Shannon wrote one episode of I Spy, a popular television series, then made the decision to leave Hollywood for the Peace Corps. Malawi, the African country to which he was assigned had been, earlier, the site for the Peace Corps service of writer Paul Theroux. When he returned to the United States following his two-year teaching stint in a remote town at the foot of Lake Malawi, he soon became active in the movement against the Vietnam War.

Over the next decades he worked at a newspaper, as a technical writer and video producer. He began his publishing career in 1972 with a bildungsroman, or coming-of-age novel called The Orphan set in the counterculture of the 1960s.

== The Jack Liffey Novels ==
The hero of Shannon's praised mystery series is Jack Liffey, introduced in the first book, The Concrete River (1996), as a laid-off aerospace worker. Depressed by his situation and self-medicating, the introspective, sensitive and quirkily humored Liffey pays for his downward spiral when his wife leaves him, taking with her Maeve, the daughter he adores.

What pulls Jack Liffey back together is a startling discovery: called upon for a favor, he finds he possesses a talent for locating missing children. Thus he embarks on a new, if self-invented, profession. Not quite a private eye, he is instead a modern-day paladin exploring the dark corners of human nature while effecting his own version of damage control. Each of the eleven Jack Liffey novels involves a perilous quest to recover a client's son or daughter and remove them from harm's way; each plunges Liffey deep into a new ethnic community or subculture of Los Angeles where the familiar quickly morphs into the strange.

In interviews John Shannon has expressed his belief that the Jack Liffey books are as much novels of redemption as they are mysteries. He could be speaking of his own character when he says, as he has of writer Kent Anderson, that: "Our surrogate adventurers have to face the ugly and cruel every day, and every day they have to reinvent human decency, out of nothing."

It is a statement that offers clear echoes of Raymond Chandler's famed description of the private eye: "Down these mean streets a man must go who is not himself mean, who is neither tarnished nor afraid. The detective must be a complete man and a common man and yet an unusual man. He must be, to use a rather weathered phrase, a man of honor. He talks as the man of his age talks, that is, with rude wit, a lively sense of the grotesque, a disgust for sham, and a contempt for pettiness."

The Shannon-Chandler connection is one that has been frequently noted by critics. For example, in the Los Angeles Times mystery writer Dick Lochte has written that "Shannon has done a remarkable update on the Chandler knight-errant" and Chicago Tribune reviewer Dick Adler called Shannon "the hands-down winner in the long-running 'Where is the Next Raymond Chandler Coming From?' sweepstakes."

Moreover, in the Jack Liffey novels, the city of Los Angeles itself maintains an ongoing starring role. Said Crime Time magazine in 2008: "Shannon's entertaining and well-written books, with their investigations of crime, corruption, shady deals, disaster capitalism and fundamentalist culture constitute nothing short of a social history of modern day Los Angeles. About City of Strangers, the Los Angeles Times pronounced: "Shannon dishes out L.A. local color dipped deep in moral sauce." Reviewing The Dark Streets, Publishers Weekly commented: "Shannon once again skillfully dissects the sociocultural landscape of Los Angeles." While the late James Crumley had this to say: “The landscape of Los Angeles, both actually and metaphorically, has been deconstructed by writers from West to Chandler to Didion, but never quite as artfully as John Shannon does it.”

John Shannon has also contributed short stories to the anthologies Murder on the Ropes, Ed. Otto Penzler, New Millennium Press, 2001 and Politics Noir, ed. Gary Phillips, Verso, 2008, and FourStory Magazine.

== Bibliography ==
=== The Jack Liffey Novels ===
1. The Concrete River, 1996

- " ... John Shannon writes of a contemporary Los Angeles with rainy winter skies, abandoned plants, idle fishing boats, 'a slum that rivaled South Africa" and residents infected by a 'grievance they can't put their finger on, a disease of anger,' Los Angeles Times

2. The Cracked Earth, 1999

- "The best L.A. scenes ever, the best private detective making love to an old movie star moments ever, the hands-down winner in the long-running 'Where is the Next Raymond Chandler Coming From?' sweepstakes -- all of these honors belong to The Cracked Earth by John Shannon," Dick Adler, Chicago Tribune

3. The Poison Sky, 2000

- “The Poison Sky is a stunner of a book and will undoubtedly bring John Shannon the attention he deserves,” The Poisoned Pen

4. The Orange Curtain, 2001

- "Readers who like gritty noir leavened by genuine heart and a healthy dollop of erudition will love Shannon’s fourth Jack Liffey mystery,” Starred Publishers Weekly
- One of the best mysteries of the year, Chicago Tribune
- One of the best mysteries of the year, Los Angeles Times
- Los Angeles Times bestseller

5. Streets on Fire, 2002

- “Liffey doesn't have much left except his marrow-deep decency, doggedness, compassion, and courage. But that will be plenty for Liffey's current fans and the new ones Streets on Fire will surely attract,” Starred Booklist

6. City of Strangers, 2003

- “The lost, mixed-up children of wealthy, mixed-up parents have a good friend in Jack Liffey, the private eye in a hard-edged, politically savvy series by John Shannon,” The New York Times,
- One of the 10 best mysteries year, Booklist

7. Terminal Island, 2004

- “Terminal Island is probably the most heartfelt book yet about the socially conscious, emotionally fragile, increasingly physically vulnerable Liffey--a most unlikely action hero whose feats of intuition, verbosity and personal empathy make an interesting contrast to the exploits of his hard-boiled peers,” Wall Street Journal

8. Dangerous Games, 2005

- “Still, the real rewards of this novel are not in the rocketing, multiple plot lines but the quieter, gray world of wounded and searching souls caught up in the madness,” Boston Globe

9. The Dark Streets, 2007

- “There's plenty of action to drive the plot, but we'll remember the book for its characters and their very human and sometimes heartbreaking predicaments. Shannon writes with compassion, as well as intelligence,” Denver Post

10. The Devils of Bakersfield, 2008

- “With snippets of social history thrown into the mix for good measure, The Devils of Bakersfield, like Shannon's other novels, is a page-turner and a confrontational critique of the culture,” CrimeTime Magazine

11. Palos Verdes Blue, 2009

- “Shannon explores the deep, sometimes deadly divide that separates haves and have-nots in his rewarding 11th mystery to feature 60-year-old Jack Liffey, who specializes in locating missing children,” Publishers Weekly

12. On the Nickel, 2010

- Jack is unable to walk or speak, but when an old friend calls to ask help finding his son, Maeve incercepts the case. She is led to L.A.'s Skid Row ("The Nickel") and gets caught up in a battle between thugs hired by a gentrifying builder and the desperate occupants of a tenement, about to be made homeless. Jack is tossed helpless into Skid Row and soon Maeve, Jack, Gloria his partner and other are trapped in a burning building and flee to the roof, where rescue becomes touch and go.

13. A Little Too Much, 2011

- Jack Liffey is hired to find a missing movie star...his daughter is in trouble at college...his partner is off on an affair...a Colombian drug gang is running wild in L.A...and an angry Jamaican is arriving for revenge. Jack finds it all... A Little Too Much.

14. The Chinese Beverly Hills, 2013

- A wildfire is out of control. Jack hunts for a missing Chinese-American girl in the midst of rising racial tensions and the hidden machinations of two oil baron brothers who try to brew up their own Tea Party.

=== Other Novels ===
- The Orphan, 1972
- Courage, 1975
- Broken Codes, 1986
- The Taking of the Waters, 1994
