= John Shannon (musician) =

American folk-rock singer-songwriter

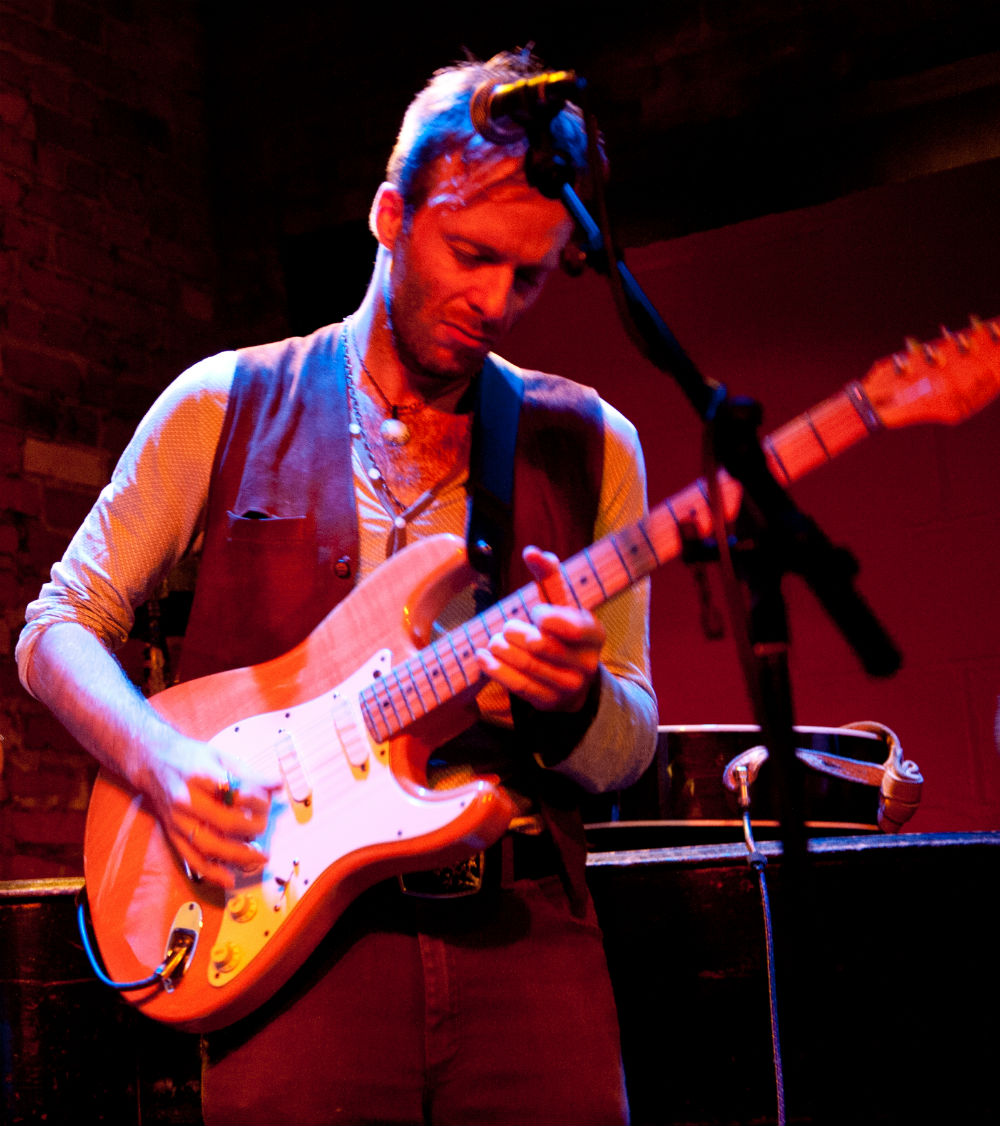

Background information
- Born: Pittsburgh, Pennsylvania, U.S.
- Genres: Rock, folk
- Occupation: Musician
- Instrument: Guitar
- Years active: 2000–present
- Labels: ObliqSound
- Website: www.johnshannonmusic.com

John Shannon is an American folk-rock singer-songwriter.

== Early life ==
Shannon grew up in Pittsburgh, Pennsylvania. His adolescence was spent in Pittsburgh's underground music scene, where indie-rock house shows and jazz gigs influenced him as much as an American Indian survival school. He is a graduate of the Berklee College of Music in Boston.

== Musical career ==
AllMusic compared him to Tim Buckley and Nick Drake, stating, "his complex folk- and jazz-flavored melodies and lyrical, acoustic guitar style, as well as his breathy vocal delivery, certainly sound heavily influenced by one or both."

Shannon's first solo album, American Mystic (ObliqSound, 2008), was described by AllMusic as "primarily a mood piece, the sort of album one plays in close proximity to a warm bath and/or a pot of herbal tea, while letting Shannon's whispery voice and gently flowing guitar wash over unencumbered." Fred Kraus of Minor 7th praised the album for its minimalist yet hypnotic sound, stating, "It's as if he's holding a stethoscope to the ground, channeling what he hears through eons of nature's voices, running it all through his heart, and then out through his fingers."

Songs of the Desert River (ObliqSound, 2011) was recorded in Paris and New York, and was backed by the band Wings of Sound, which features Dan Brantigan on flugelhorn, Garth Stevenson on acoustic bass, Ziv Ravitz on drums, and Caroline McMahon on backing vocals. In his AllMusic review, Thom Jurek praised the way Wings of Sound subtly complimented Shannon, stating, "it is deceptively simple in its articulation of the profound, yet remains utterly mysterious; its abundant beauty resonates long after its final song echoes, then vanishes into the realm of silence"

Time Was a Lie (Creek Valley, 2012) was Shannon's first album to include electric bass. The album features Evan Pazner on drums, Caroline McMahon on backing vocals and Tony Grey on electric bass. Regarding the album, David Kleiner of Minor 7th states how Shannon uses repetition in both sound and key lyrics to create a hypnotic effect, stating, "The songs' rhythms tend to stay constant while drawing in the listener, whether Shannon is picking the acoustic to create a tumbling waterfall repetition in tunes like 'Burning Embers' or strumming an unchanging rhythm as in 'City Lights.'" The album also features a cover of Paul Simon's "Graceland".

Shannon is also known for his work as a sideman guitarist with artists such as pianist Hiromi Uehara, singer/songwriter James Maddock, saxophonist Bob Reynolds, singer/songwriter Sonya Kitchell and cellist/trombonist Dana Leong.

== Discography ==
=== Solo ===
- American Mystic (ObliqSound, 2008)
- Songs of the Desert River (ObliqSound, 2011)
- Time Was A Lie (Creek Valley, 2012)

=== As sideman ===
- Words Came Back to Me Sonya Kitchell (Hear Music/Velour)
- Gary Go Gary Go (Decca/Polydor)
