= John Fielding =

English magistrate and reformer (1721–1780)

Sir John Fielding
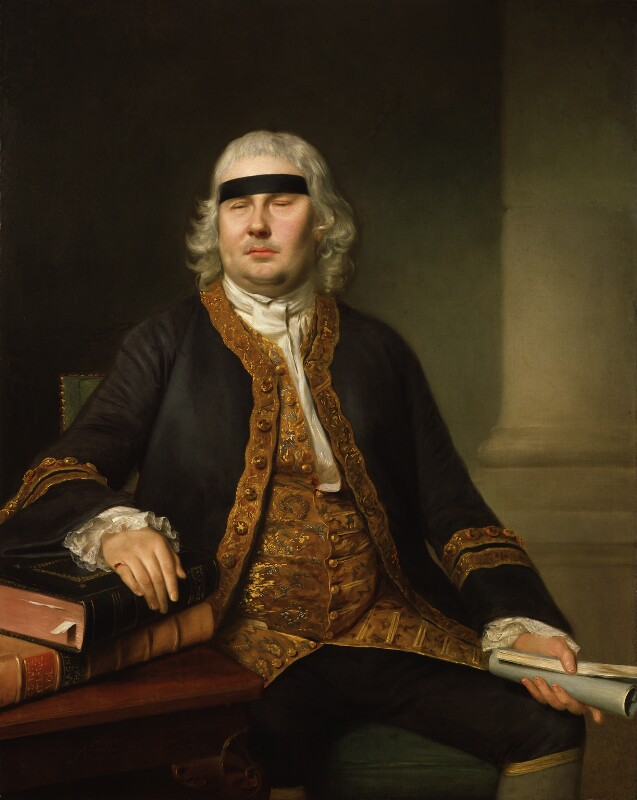
- Born: 16 September 1721
- Died: 4 September 1780 (aged 58)
- Other name: Blind Beak
- Occupations: Magistrate, social reformer
- Relatives: Henry Fielding (half-brother)

Sir John Fielding (16 September 1721 – 4 September 1780) was an English magistrate and social reformer of the 18th century. He was the younger half-brother of novelist, playwright and chief magistrate Henry Fielding. Despite being blinded in an accident at the age of 19, John set up his own business and, in his spare time, studied law with Henry.

== Early life ==
John Fielding was born on 16 September 1721, most likely in Blenheim Street, St James's, London. He was the third child of Lieutenant-General Edmund Fielding and his second wife Anne née Blanchard. Fielding's mother had previously been married to an Italian named Rapha and may have been the owner of an "eating house" in London. Among Fielding's half-siblings were Henry Fielding and Sarah Fielding, with whom he had close relationships, both products of his father's first marriage

Very little is known about Fielding's childhood and early life; it is possible that he spent some time in service with the Royal Navy. He had poor eyesight, and in 1740 was undergoing treatment from a surgeon named James Wilkie when as a result of Wilkie's negligence Fielding was blinded. In the following year Wilkie was forced to pay £500 in damages to Fielding.

== Career ==
Fielding joined with his brother Henry and several others in February 1750 to create the University Register Office. The aim of the organisation was to be an intermediary for business transactions in order to "bring the World...together", however over time it changed focus to function as an employment exchange and seller of "Glastonbury water". The business was based on the Strand and Fielding lived at the premises as manager.

Appointed Henry's personal assistant in 1750, John helped him to root out corruption and improve the competence of those engaged in administering justice in London. They formed the first professional police force, the Bow Street Runners. Through the regular circulation of a police gazette containing descriptions of known criminals, Fielding also established the basis for the first police criminal records department.

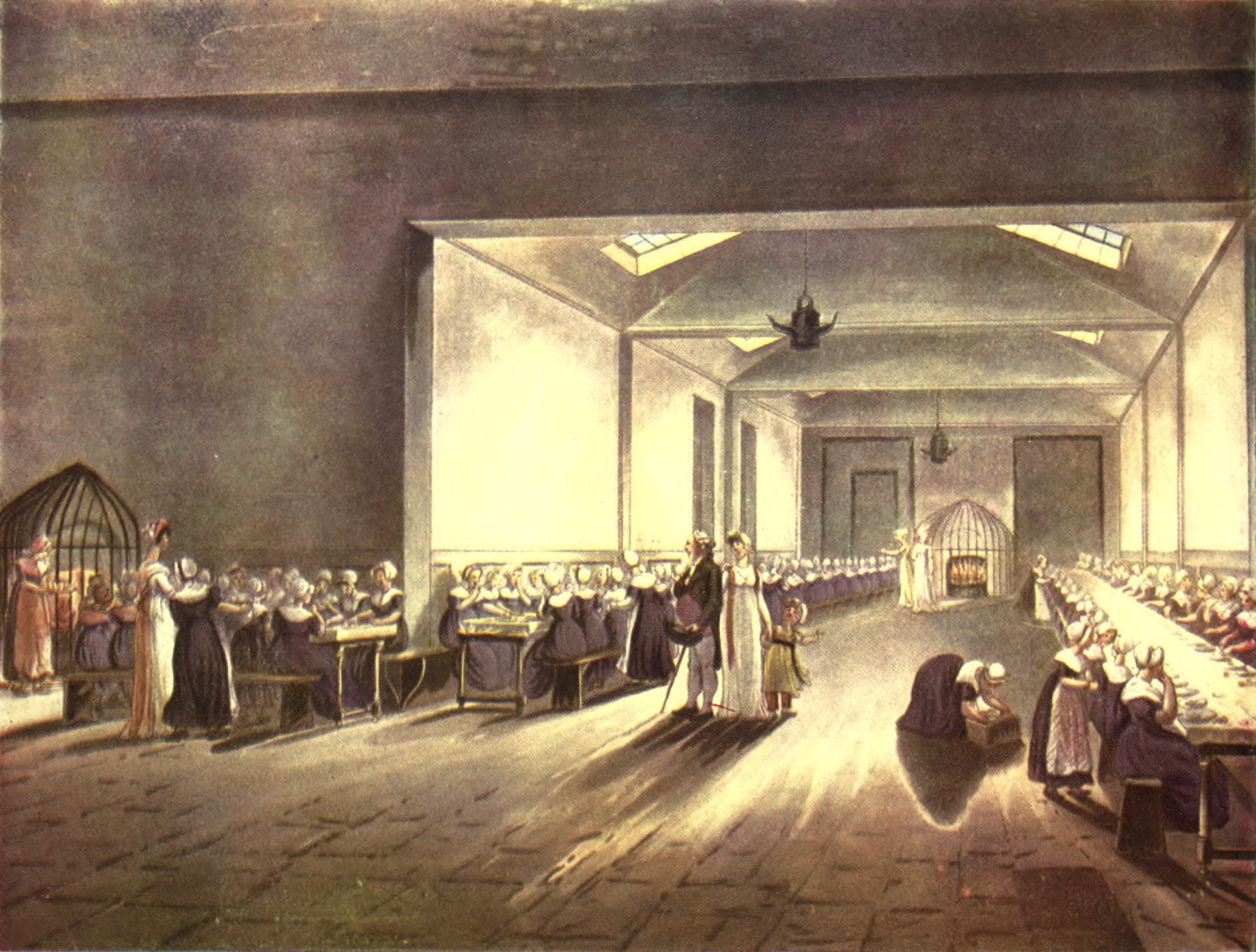
Dining hall of the Lambeth Asylum for Female Orphans founded in 1758 by magistrate John Fielding

When Henry died in 1754, John was appointed magistrate at Bow Street in his place, becoming renowned as the "Blind Beak", and allegedly being able to recognize three thousand criminals by the sounds of their voices. He also continued to develop his ideas on crime prevention and youth employment, helping to found the Asylum for Orphan Girls in Lambeth in 1758. He was knighted in 1761.

== Personal life ==
Fielding married Elizabeth Whittingham of Lichfield, the daughter of a reverend doctor, on 21 November 1751 at a chapel on Duke Street, St James's. The couple did not have any children but Elizabeth's niece Mary Anne Whittingham lived with them, choosing to also adopt Fielding's surname. She married Allen, the son of Fielding's brother Henry. Elizabeth died in 1774 and on 6 August the same year Fielding married again, this time to Mary Sedgley of Brompton, at the parish church of Kensington. Fielding again had no children with his wife, who outlived him, dying in 1794.

== In popular culture ==
- Charles Dickens used John Fielding as a character in his Barnaby Rudge.
- Ken Follett used John Fielding as a character in his book A Place Called Freedom.
- John Fielding is the protagonist's employer in John Dickson Carr's 1962 historical novel The Demoniacs.
- Leon Garfield's Smith (1967), which deals with London's underworld, highwaymen and footpads, contains a blind justice.
- A 1984 West German television series The Blind Judge is based on his career, with Franz Josef Steffens playing Fielding
- John Fielding is a key secondary character in Lempriere's Dictionary (1991) by Lawrence Norfolk although he was dead at the time the scenes were set.
- A fictionalized Sir John Fielding is the protagonist of eleven historical detective novels published from 1994 to 2005. Set in Britain's Georgian period, the series was written by American author Bruce Cook under the pseudonym Bruce Alexander.
- John Fielding is an important character in the historical detective novel Death in the Dark Walk (1994), written by Deryn Lake.
- John Fielding is played by David Fox in the 1997 BBC production of Tom Jones, where he appears as the judge presiding over the protagonist's trial.
- John Fielding is portrayed by David Warner in the 2006 British television film of Sweeney Todd, starring Ray Winstone.
- The 2008 Channel 4 television series City of Vice is based on the crime investigation work of the Fielding brothers. Iain Glen plays John Fielding.
- John Fielding is a recurring supporting character in a series of Benjamin Franklin mysteries by Robert Lee Hall—set in London during the late 1750s. In many instances Fielding himself requests Franklin's help solving a murder.
