= Michael Caine filmography =

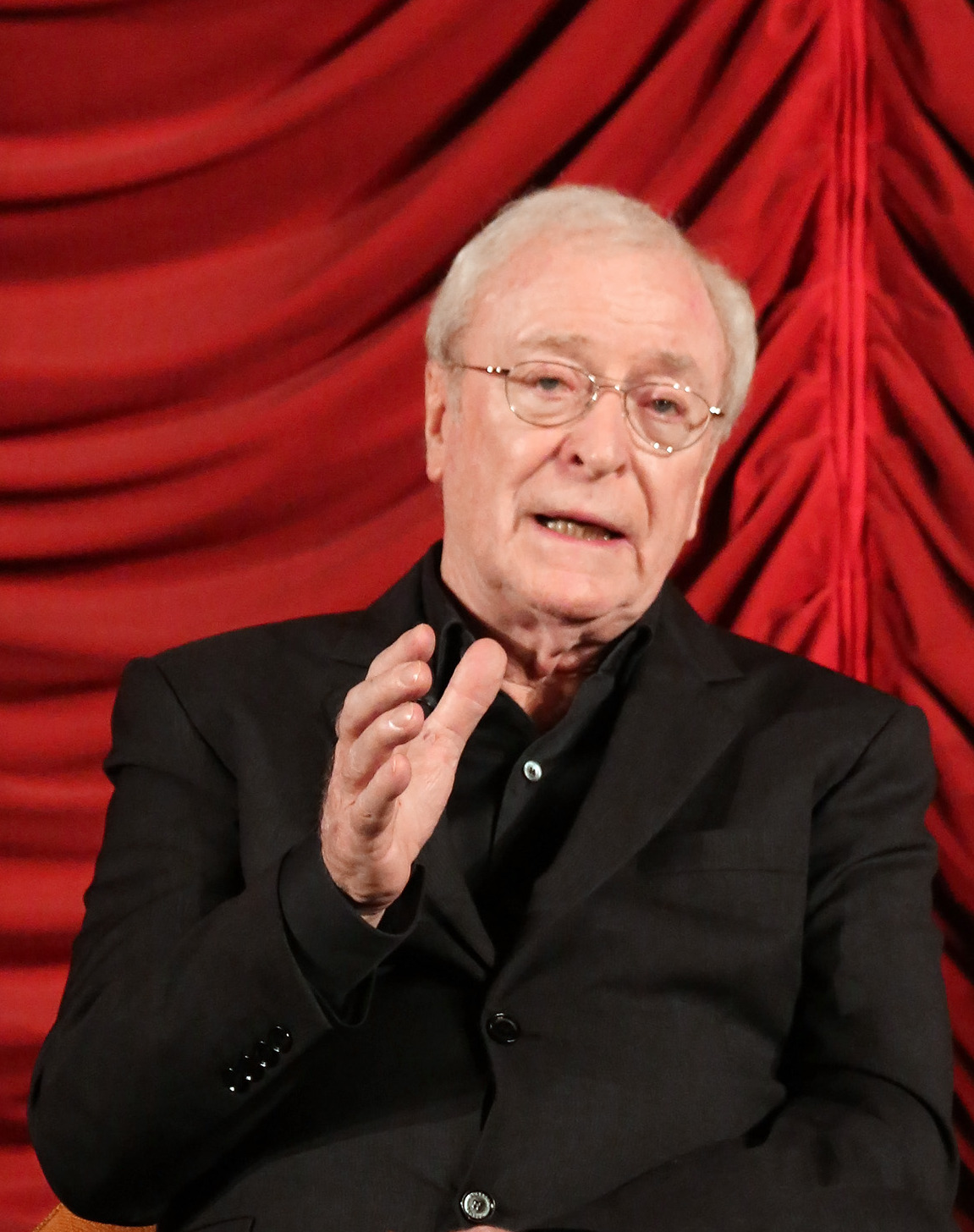
Caine at the 2012 Vienna International Film Festival

Michael Caine is an English retired actor who has appeared in over 130 films and has had multiple television appearances. Caine's acting career began in the 1950s, when he was cast in many small, often uncredited roles in British films. Caine gained recognition as one of the most famous actors of the 1960s through his breakthrough role in the film Zulu (1964). He then portrayed spy Harry Palmer in the films The Ipcress File (1965), Funeral in Berlin (1966) and Billion Dollar Brain (1967). He also had starring roles in The Italian Job and Battle of Britain (both 1969).

His role in Sleuth (1972) led him to an Academy Award for Best Actor nomination. Caine has won a Best Supporting Actor Oscar for the films Hannah and Her Sisters (1986) and The Cider House Rules (1999). More recently, Caine has gained a new following through his collaborations with British-American filmmaker Christopher Nolan in The Dark Knight Trilogy films, as well as The Prestige (2006), Inception (2010), Interstellar (2014), Dunkirk (2017) and Tenet (2020). Caine announced his retirement from acting in October 2023.

== Film ==
Year	Title	Role	Director	Notes
1950	Morning Departure	Teaboy	Harold Clayton	Uncredited
1956	Panic in the Parlour	Sailor	Gordon Parry	
1956	A Hill in Korea	Private Lockyer	Julian Amyes	Originally titled Hell in Korea
1957	The Steel Bayonet	Caine	Michael Carreras	Uncredited
1957	How to Murder a Rich Uncle	Gilrony	Nigel Patrick	
1958	A Woman of Mystery	Minor Role	Ernest Morris	Uncredited
1958	Carve Her Name with Pride	Thirsty Prisoner on Train	Lewis Gilbert	Uncredited
1958	The Key	Bit part	Carol Reed	Uncredited
1958	Blind Spot	Johnny Brent	Peter Maxwell	
1958	The Two-Headed Spy	Gestapo Agent	Andre De Toth	
1958	Passport to Shame	Bridegroom	Alvin Rakoff	Also titled Room 43
1959	Danger Within	Prisoner with Pin-Up	Don Chaffey	Uncredited
1960	Foxhole in Cairo	Weber	John Llewellyn Moxey	
1960	The Bulldog Breed	Sailor in Cinema Fight	Robert Asher	Uncredited
1961	The Day the Earth Caught Fire	Checkpoint Policeman	Val Guest	Uncredited
1962	Solo for Sparrow	Paddy Mooney	Gordon Flemyng	
1963	The Wrong Arm of the Law	Police Station PC	Cliff Owen	Uncredited
1964	Zulu	Lt. Gonville Bromhead	Cy Endfield	
1965	The Ipcress File	Harry Palmer	Sidney J. Furie	
1966	Alfie	Alfie Elkins	Lewis Gilbert	Nominated - Academy Award for Best Actor
1966	The Wrong Box	Michael Finsbury	Bryan Forbes	
1966	Gambit	Harry Tristan Dean	Ronald Neame	
1966	Funeral in Berlin	Harry Palmer	Guy Hamilton	
1967	Hurry Sundown	Henry Warren	Otto Preminger	
1967	Woman Times Seven	Handsome Stranger	Vittorio De Sica	Segment: "Snow"
1967	Billion Dollar Brain	Harry Palmer	Ken Russell	
1968	Deadfall	Henry Stuart Clarke	Bryan Forbes	
1968	The Magus	Nicholas Urfe	Guy Green	
1969	Play Dirty	Captain Douglas	Andre De Toth	
1969	The Italian Job	Charlie Croker	Peter Collinson	Also contributed to soundtrack. Vocals on "Getta Bloomin' Move On!"
1969	Battle of Britain	Squadron Leader Canfield	Guy Hamilton	
1970	Too Late the Hero	Pvt. Tosh Hearne	Robert Aldrich	
1970	Simon, Simon	Himself	Graham Stark	Short film
1971	Get Carter	Jack Carter	Mike Hodges	
1971	The Last Valley	The Captain	James Clavell	
1971	Kidnapped	Alan Breck	Delbert Mann	
1972	X Y & Zee	Robert Blakeley	Brian G. Hutton	
1972	Pulp	Mickey King	Mike Hodges	
1972	Sleuth	Milo Tindle	Joseph L. Mankiewicz	Nominated - Academy Award for Best Actor
1974	The Black Windmill	Major John Tarrant	Don Siegel	
1974	The Marseille Contract	John Deray	Robert Parrish	Released in the U.S. as The Destructors
1975	The Wilby Conspiracy	Jim Keogh	Ralph Nelson	
1975	The Romantic Englishwoman	Lewis Fielding	Joseph Losey	
1975	The Man Who Would Be King	Peachy Carnehan	John Huston	
1976	Peeper	Leslie C. Tucker	Peter Hyams	
1976	Harry and Walter Go to New York	Adam Worth	Mark Rydell	
1976	The Eagle Has Landed	Colonel Kurt Steiner	John Sturges	
1977	A Bridge Too Far	Joe Vandeleur	Richard Attenborough	
1978	Silver Bears	Doc Fletcher	Ivan Passer	
1978	The Swarm	Dr. Bradford Crane	Irwin Allen	
1978	California Suite	Sidney Cochran	Herbert Ross	
1979	Ashanti	Dr. David Linderby	Richard Fleischer	
1979	Beyond the Poseidon Adventure	Captain Mike Turner	Irwin Allen	
1980	Dressed to Kill	Dr. Robert Elliott	Brian De Palma	
1980	The Island	Blair Maynard	Michael Ritchie	
1981	The Hand	Jonathan Lansdale	Oliver Stone	
1981	Escape to Victory	Captain John Colby	John Huston	
1982	Deathtrap	Sidney Bruhl	Sidney Lumet	
1983	Educating Rita	Dr. Frank Bryant	Lewis Gilbert	Nominated - Academy Award for Best Actor
1983	The Honorary Consul	Charley Fortnum, Consul	John Mackenzie	
1983	The Jigsaw Man	Philip Kimberly / Sergei Kuzminsky	Terence Young	
1983	Monty Python's The Meaning of Life	Soldier	Terry Jones	Uncredited
1984	Blame It on Rio	Matthew Hollins	Stanley Donen	
1985	Water	Governor Baxter Thwaites	Dick Clement	
1985	The Holcroft Covenant	Noel Holcroft	John Frankenheimer	
1986	Hannah and Her Sisters	Elliot	Woody Allen	Academy Award for Best Supporting Actor
1986	Sweet Liberty	Elliott James	Alan Alda	
1986	Mona Lisa	Mortwell	Neil Jordan	
1986	Half Moon Street	Lord Sam Bulbeck	Bob Swaim	
1986	The Whistle Blower	Frank Jones	Simon Langton	
1987	The Fourth Protocol	John Preston	John Mackenzie	Also executive producer
1987	Jaws: The Revenge	Hoagie Newcombe	Joseph Sargent	
1987	Surrender	Sean Stein	Jerry Belson	
1988	Without a Clue	Sherlock Holmes / Reginald Kincaid	Thom Eberhardt	
1988	Dirty Rotten Scoundrels	Lawrence Jamieson	Frank Oz	
1990	A Shock to the System	Graham Marshall	Jan Egleson	
1990	Mr. Destiny	Mike / Mr. Destiny	James Orr	
1990	Bullseye	Sidney Lipton / Doctor Hicklar	Michael Winner	
1992	Noises Off	Lloyd Fellowes	Peter Bogdanovich	
1992	Blue Ice	Harry Anders	Russell Mulcahy	Also producer
1992	The Muppet Christmas Carol	Ebenezer Scrooge	Brian Henson	
1994	On Deadly Ground	Michael Jennings	Steven Seagal	
1996	Blood and Wine	Victor 'Vic' Spansky	Bob Rafelson	
1998	Shadow Run	Haskell	Geoffrey Reeve	
1998	Curtain Call	Max Gale	Peter Yates	
1998	Little Voice	Ray Say	Mark Herman	
1999	The Cider House Rules	Dr. Wilbur Larch	Lasse Hallström	Academy Award for Best Supporting Actor
1999	The Debtors	Addict	Evi Quaid	
2000	Quills	Dr. Royer-Collard	Philip Kaufman	
2000	Shiner	Billy 'Shiner' Simpson	John Irvin	
2000	Get Carter	Cliff Brumby	Stephen Kay	
2000	Miss Congeniality	Victor Melling	Donald Petrie	
2001	Last Orders	Jack	Fred Schepisi	
2002	Austin Powers in Goldmember	Nigel Powers	Jay Roach	
2002	The Quiet American	Thomas Fowler	Phillip Noyce	Nominated - Academy Award for Best Actor
2003	Quicksand	Jake Mellows	John Mackenzie	
2003	The Actors	O'Malley	Conor McPherson	
2003	Secondhand Lions	Garth	Tim McCanlies	
2003	The Statement	Pierre Brossard	Norman Jewison	
2004	Around the Bend	Henry Lair	Jordan Roberts	
2005	Batman Begins	Alfred Pennyworth	Christopher Nolan	First collaboration with Nolan
2005	Bewitched	Nigel Bigelow	Nora Ephron	
2005	The Weather Man	Robert Spritzel	Gore Verbinski	
2006	Children of Men	Jasper	Alfonso Cuarón	
2006	The Prestige	John Cutter	Christopher Nolan	
2007	Flawless	Mr. Hobbs	Michael Radford	
2007	Sleuth	Andrew Wyke	Kenneth Branagh	
2008	The Dark Knight	Alfred Pennyworth	Christopher Nolan	
2008	Is Anybody There?	Clarence	John Crowley	
2009	Harry Brown	Harry Brown	Daniel Barber	
2010	Inception	Professor Stephen Miles	Christopher Nolan	
2011	Gnomeo & Juliet	Lord Redbrick	Kelly Asbury	Voice
2011	Cars 2	Finn McMissile	John Lasseter	Voice
2012	Journey 2: The Mysterious Island	Alexander Anderson	Brad Peyton	
2012	The Dark Knight Rises	Alfred Pennyworth	Christopher Nolan	
2013	Now You See Me	Arthur Tressler	Louis Leterrier	
2013	Mr. Morgan's Last Love	Matthew Morgan	Sandra Nettelbeck	
2014	Stonehearst Asylum	Dr. Benjamin Salt	Brad Anderson	
2014	Interstellar	Professor John Brand	Christopher Nolan	
2015	Kingsman: The Secret Service	Chester King/Arthur	Matthew Vaughn	
2015	Youth	Fred Ballinger	Paolo Sorrentino	
2015	The Last Witch Hunter	Father Dolan	Breck Eisner	
2016	Now You See Me 2	Arthur Tressler	Jon M. Chu	
2017	Going in Style	Joe Harding	Zach Braff	
2017	Dunkirk	Fortis Leader	Christopher Nolan	Uncredited voice cameo
2017	My Generation	Himself	David Batty	Documentary film
2018	Dear Dictator	General Anton Vincent	Lisa Addario & Joe Syracuse	
2018	Sherlock Gnomes	Lord Redbrick	John Stevenson	Voice
2018	King of Thieves	Brian Reader	James Marsh	
2020	Come Away	Charlie	Brenda Chapman	
2020	Four Kids and It	The Psammead	Andy De Emmony	Voice
2020	Tenet	Sir Michael Crosby	Christopher Nolan	
2021	Twist	Fagin	Martin Owen	
2021	Best Sellers	Harris Shaw	Lina Roessler	
2022	Medieval	Lord Boresh	Petr Jákl	
2023	The Great Escaper	Bernard Jordan	Oliver Parker	Final film role

== Television ==
Year	Title	Role	Notes
1956	The Adventures of Sir Lancelot	Third Knight	Credited as Michael Scott; Episode: "The Magic Sword"
1956	Sunday Night Theatre	Boudousse	Episode: "The Lark"
1957	Blood Money	Fighter	
1957	Sunday Night Theatre	Fighter	Episode: "Requiem for a Heavyweight"
1957	Dixon of Dock Green	Indian pedlar	Episode: "A Penn'orth of Allsorts"
1958	Navy Log	Soldier No. 1	Episode: "The Field"
1958	The Vise	Folsham	Episode: "The Sucker Game"
1958	Sunday Night Theatre	Third P.C.	Episode: "The Frog"
1958	The Adventures of William Tell	Max	Episode: "The Prisoner"
1958	Dixon of Dock Green	Brocklehurst	Episode: "Bracelets for the Groom"
1959	Television Playwright	Exterior Guard	Episode: "The Dark Side of the Earth"
1959	Dixon of Dock Green	Tufty Morris	Episode: "Helmet on the Sideboard"
1959	The Adventures of William Tell	Sgt. Weinar	Episode: "The General's Daughter"
1960	Deadline Midnight	Ted Drake	Episode 1.5
1960	No Wreath for the General	Second Police Constable	
1961	The Compartment	Young Man	
1961	Walk a Crooked Mile	Police constable	Miniseries
1961	Armchair Theatre	Helmsman	Episode: "The Ship That Couldn't Stop"
1961	The Younger Generation	Ray the Raver	Episode: "Goodbye Charlie"
1961	ITV Play of the Week	PC Wimbush	Uncredited; Episode: "Ring of Truth"
1962	The Edgar Wallace Mystery Theatre	Paddy Mooney	Episode: "Solo for Sparrow"
1962	ITV Play of the Week	Willie Mossop	Episode: "Hobson's Choice"
1963	First Night	Johnny / Reggie Downes	Episodes: "Funny Noises with Their Mouths" and "The Way with Reggie"
1964	ITV Play of the Week	George Grant	Episode: "The Other Man"
1964	Hamlet	Horatio	
1969	Male of the Species	Cornelius	
1969	ITV Saturday Night Theatre	Cornelius	Episode: "Cornelius"
1988	Jack the Ripper	Chief Insp. Frederick Abberline	Winner - Golden Globe Award for Best Actor - Miniseries or Television Film
1990	Jekyll & Hyde	Dr Henry Jekyll / Mr Edward Hyde	Nominated - Golden Globe Award for Best Actor - Miniseries or Television Film
1994	World War II: When Lions Roared	Joseph Stalin	Documentary
1995	Bullet to Beijing	Harry Palmer	Television film
1996	Midnight in Saint Petersburg	Harry Palmer	Television film
1997	Mandela and de Klerk	F.W. de Klerk	Nominated - Golden Globe Award for Best Actor - Miniseries or Television Film
1997	20,000 Leagues Under the Sea	Captain Nemo	
2003	Freedom: A History of Us	William Pitt (voice)	Episode: "Independence"
2003	Freedom: A History of Us	The Rev. John Cotton (voice)	Episode: "Liberty for All"
2003	Freedom: A History of Us	Lord Cornwallis (voice)	Episode: "Revolution"
2003	Freedom: A History of Us	Edward Everett (voice)	Episode: "Wake Up America"
2003	Freedom: A History of Us	William Wood (voice)	Episode: "Working for Freedom"
2003	Freedom: A History of Us	Newspaper Editor (voice)	Episode: "Yearning to Breathe Free"

== Theatre ==
Year	Title	Role	Notes
1963	Next Time I'll Sing to You	Meff	Criterion Theatre and New Arts Theatre

== Video games ==
Year	Title	Role
2005	Batman Begins	Alfred Pennyworth
2015	GivingTales	Little Claus, Big Claus

Note: in The Italian Job (2001 video game), Caine's voice (as Charlie Croker) was impersonated by Phil Cornwell.

== Box office ranking ==
At his peak, exhibitors voted Michael Caine one of the most popular stars at the box office:

- 1966 – 2nd (UK)
- 1967 – 15th (US)
- 1969 – 3rd (UK)
- 1970 – 8th (UK)
- 1971 – 4th (UK)

== See also ==
- List of awards and nominations received by Michael Caine
