= David Ussery =

David Wayne Ussery
- Born: 9 May, 1960; Springdale, Arkansas
- Citizenship: U.S.
- Occupations: Bioinformatician, academic, and author

Academic background
- Education: B.A. in Chemistry; M.Sc. in Physical Chemistry; Ph.D. in Biochemistry
- Alma mater: William Jewell College; University of New Mexico; University of Cincinnati College of Medicine
- Website: https://ussery.org

David Wayne Ussery is an American bioinformatician, academic, and author. He is a professor in the Department of Physiological Sciences, in the College of Veterinary Medicine at Oklahoma State University, where he is the director for the INTERACT (Interdisciplinary Network for Tracking Emerging Risks, Analytics, and Comparative Translational genomics) program. Before coming to OSU, he was a professor in both the Department of Physiology and Cell Biology and the Department of Biomedical Informatics at the University of Arkansas for Medical Sciences (UAMS) and holds the Helen G. Adams/ARA Endowed Chair in BioMedical Informatics.

Ussery's research has focused on bioinformatic analysis of bacterial genomes and has published a textbook in the discipline of Comparative Genomics, titled Computing for Comparative Microbial Genomics: Bioinformatics for Microbiologists. His notable contributions include a course on Comparative Genomics, and publications in journals, including the Journal of Clinical Microbiology, Nucleic Acids Research, and Advances in Genome Biology.

Ussery led the Comparative Genomics Group at Oak Ridge National Labs and the Comparative Microbial Genomics group at the Technical University of Denmark, as well as served on the Board of the Genomic Standards Consortium (GSC).

== Education ==
Ussery completed his B.A. in Chemistry at William Jewell College in 1982 and his M.Sc. in Physical Chemistry at the University of New Mexico in 1986. Later, he earned his Ph.D. in Biochemistry and Molecular Biology from the University of Cincinnati College of Medicine in 1993. He completed his post doctoral training at Institute of Molecular Medicine at Oxford University from 1992 to 1995.

== Career ==
In 1997, Ussery became an Assistant Research Professor at the Center for Biological Sequence Analysis (CBS), the Technical University of Denmark. Between 1997 and 1998, he served as a Visiting assistant professor in the Department of Biology at Roanoke College. In 1998, he was appointed Associate Research Professor in CBS at the Institute of Biotechnology, the Technical University of Denmark, a position he retained until 2002. In 2002, he assumed the position of Associate Professor at the CBS, the Technical University of Denmark, a role he maintained until 2014. Additionally, from 2012 to 2018, he was a Visiting International Professor at St. Olav's Hospital, Norwegian University of Science and Technology (NTNU). Since 2016, he has been a professor in the Department of Biomedical Informatics and a professor in the Department of Physiology and Cell Biology at the UAMS. Since 2017, he has also held the Helen G. Adams/ARA Endowed Chair in BioMedical Informatics there.

== Research ==
Ussery has engaged in bioinformatic analysis of bacterial genomes and has conducted collaborative studies with a focus on genomics and computational biology. In 1999, he published the first "genome atlas" of the E. coli genome, a graphical visualization of 4.6 million bp genome in a single figure, showing structural features along the chromosome. In a joint study, he contributed to analysis of the Schizosaccharomyces pombe genome, uncovering its unique genetic structure, conserved genes essential for eukaryotic cell organization, and insights into eukaryotic evolution. Later, he characterized and analyzed the genome of Aspergillus niger CBS 513.88 through comparative genomics and metabolic modeling, providing insights into its versatile metabolism, protein secretion mechanisms, hydrolytic enzyme production, and biosynthetic pathways for secondary metabolites. He co-developed RNAmmer, a computational tool that annotated ribosomal RNA genes using hidden Markov models.

A Genome Atlas for the main E. coli chromosome. The atlas in this figure is for K-12 strain, isolate MG1655, first published in 1997 (GenBank accession U00096).

Ussery introduced the Minimum Information about a Genome Sequence (MIGS) specification. He also developed a web-based approach for multilocus sequence typing (MLST) using whole-genome sequencing (WGS) data, providing a method for bacterial strain identification across 66 species. Furthermore, he devised a reference-free method for genome assembly and genetic element identification in complex metagenomic samples.

In addition to his research publications, Ussery co-authored a textbook in the discipline of Comparative Genomics, titled Computing for Comparative Microbial Genomics: Bioinformatics for Microbiologists. This work provided a foundational understanding of comparative microbial genomics, presenting computational methods, practical applications, and analytical frameworks for studying microbial genome sequences and ecological interactions.

== Awards and honors ==
- 2011 – Member, Faculty of a thousand (F1000)
- 2016 – Fellow Award, Arkansas Research Alliance

== Bibliography ==
=== Books ===
- Computing for Comparative Microbial Genomics: Bioinformatics for Microbiologists (2009) ISBN 9781848002548

=== Selected articles ===
- Wood, V., Gwilliam, R., Rajandream, M. A., Lyne, M., Lyne, R., Stewart, A., ... & Nurse, P. (2002). The genome sequence of Schizosaccharomyces pombe. Nature, 415(6874), 871–880.
- Lagesen, K., Hallin, P., Rødland, E. A., Stærfeldt, H. H., Rognes, T., & Ussery, D. W. (2007). RNAmmer: consistent and rapid annotation of ribosomal RNA genes. Nucleic Acids Research, 35(9), 3100–3108.
- Pel, H. J., de Winde, J. H., Archer, D. B., Dyer, P. S., Hofmann, G., Schaap, P. J., ... & Stam, H. (2007). Genome sequencing and analysis of the versatile cell factory Aspergillus niger CBS 513.88. Nature Biotechnology, 25(2), 221–231.
- Field, D., Garrity, G., Gray, T., Morrison, N., Selengut, J., Sterk, P., ... & Wipat, A. (2008). The minimum information about a genome sequence (MIGS) specification. Nature Biotechnology, 26(5), 541–547.
- Larsen, M. V., Cosentino, S., Rasmussen, S., Friis, C., Hasman, H., Marvig, R. L., ... & Lund, O. (2012). Multilocus sequence typing of total-genome-sequenced bacteria. Journal of Clinical Microbiology, 50(4), 1355–1361.
