= Stanley Caine =

British actor (1935–2013)

- Caine as Coco in The Italian Job (1969), his most notable and final film role
- Born: Stanley Victor Micklewhite; October 1935; Southwark, London, England
- Died: 13 January 2013 (aged 77); Ruislip, London, England
- Years active: 1966–1969
- Spouse: Marie Caine (m. 2000)
- Relatives: Michael Caine (brother)

Stanley Caine (born Stanley Victor Micklewhite; October 1935 – 13 January 2013) was an English actor and the younger brother of actor Michael Caine. He was best known for his role as "Coco" in The Italian Job, a film released in 1969 also starring Michael Caine.

In addition to his older brother Michael, Stanley had an older maternal half-brother David whom Stan and Michael only knew of after their mother's death in 1989. Their half-brother died in 1992.

After acting, Caine worked at Selfridge's department store, including in furniture delivery, later becoming a writer; he was also supported by an allowance from his brother, who also bought him two houses, "one to live in and one to rent so he could have some money to buy some booze". Caine was an alcoholic, and he was diagnosed with leukemia in early 2008. He died in his sleep in January 2013 in Ruislip, West London.

== Filmography ==
Year	Title	Role	Notes
1966	Softly, Softly	Police Constable	1 episode Uncredited
1967	Billion Dollar Brain	G.P.O. Special Delivery Boy	with Michael Caine
1969	Play Dirty	German Officer	with Michael Caine
1969	The Italian Job	Coco	with Michael Caine (final film role)
