= Play Dirty (1969 film) =

1969 film by André de Toth

- Theatrical release poster
- Directed by: Andre de Toth
- Screenplay by: Melvyn Bragg; Lotte Colin
- Story by: George Marton
- Produced by: Harry Saltzman
- Starring: Michael Caine; Nigel Davenport; Nigel Green; Harry Andrews; Aly Ben Ayed; Vivian Pickles
- Cinematography: Edward Scaife
- Edited by: Jack Slade; Alan Osbiston (uncredited)
- Music by: Michel Legrand
- Production company: Lowndes Productions Limited
- Distributed by: United Artists
- Release dates: 2 January 1969 (United Kingdom); 15 January 1969 (United States)
- Running time: 117 minutes
- Country: United Kingdom
- Language: English

Play Dirty is a 1969 British war film starring Michael Caine, Nigel Davenport, Nigel Green and Harry Andrews. It was director Andre de Toth's last film, based on a screenplay by Melvyn Bragg and Lotte Colin.

The film's story is inspired by the exploits of units such as the Long Range Desert Group, Popski's Private Army and the SAS in North Africa during the Second World War.

== Plot ==
Captain Douglas is a BP employee seconded to the Royal Engineers during the North African Campaign of the Second World War, overseeing incoming fuel supplies for the British Eighth Army. Colonel Masters commands a special raiding unit composed of convicted criminals, and after a string of failures his commander, Brigadier Blore, orders him on a dangerous last-chance mission to destroy an Afrika Korps fuel depot, otherwise his unit will be disbanded. Masters is ordered to include a regular officer on the mission and selects Douglas, against his wishes, for his technical knowledge. Leech, a convicted criminal rescued from prison, is given operational command.

Douglas and Leech set off into the desert in armed jeeps disguised as an Italian Army patrol. Accompanying them are the Tunisian Sadok (demolition man), the Greek smuggler Kostas Manou (armorer), Boudesh (communications), the Cypriot Kafkarides (transport and supplies), and Arab guides Hassan and Assin. They encounter hostile tribesmen, sandstorms and a booby-trapped oasis during their long journey. Unknown to Masters, Blore dispatched a regular army raiding party overloaded in wheeled trucks two days behind Masters, but they are wiped out in a German ambush.

Douglas commands no respect from Leech and his men, who are often insubordinate. Douglas captures a German ambulance and female nurse, who is forced to tend to one of the Arabs who has been injured while robbing a corpse. Three of the men attempt to rape the nurse, who defends herself. When the group finally reaches the objective, they discover the depot is fake and Leech admits to Douglas he is being kept alive only because Masters is paying him £2000 for his safe return. When Douglas insists the men search for the real fuel depot, they refuse. Instead, Leech leads the group to a German-occupied port city, hoping to steal a boat and escape. When Douglas discovers the real fuel depot is there, he convinces Leech that destroying it would aid their escape plan.

At headquarters, Masters is confronted by Blore with aerial photographs of the supposed depot intact — confirming the mission's failure. Having lost contact with the men, Masters leaks intelligence on the team's composition and mission to the Germans. Since the British Army is now on the offensive, Blore wishes to preserve the German fuel depot for capture.

Leech's group infiltrate the port at night wearing German uniforms, but are discovered after setting their explosives. An officer on a loudspeaker calls on them individually by name, revealing Blore and Masters' betrayal. Leech and Douglas manage to slip away as the explosives go off, while the rest are killed one by one. The injured man, left behind in the ambulance, uses his last strength to murder the German nurse bound and gagged beside him.

The Eighth Army arrives at the port the next morning. When Douglas and Leech, in German uniform, attempt to surrender a trigger-happy British soldier kills them before noticing their white flag. The soldier is chastised by his superior and the British troops move on.

== Cast ==
- Michael Caine as Captain Douglas, Royal Engineers
- Nigel Davenport as Captain Cyril Leech
- Nigel Green as Lieutenant Colonel Masters
- Harry Andrews as Brigadier Blore
- Patrick Jordan as Major Alan Watkins, Guards Commando Unit
- Daniel Pilon as Captain Attwood, Blore's Adjutant
- Bernard Archard as Colonel Homerton
- fr:Aly Ben Ayed as Sadok
- Enrique Avila as Kafkarides, a Cypriot Volunteer
- Takis Emmanouel as Kostas Manou
- Vivian Pickles as a German Nurse
- Stanley Caine as German Officer, Stanley is the younger brother of Michael Caine.
- Martin Burland as Dead Officer
- George McKeenan as Corporal At Quayside
- Bridget Espeet as Ann
- Mohsen Ben Abdallah as Hassan
- fr:Mohamed Kouka as Assine
- Scott Miller as Boudesh
- Michael Stevens as Captain Johnson
- Tony Stamboulieh as Barman In Arab Bar
- Jose Halufi as Arab
- Jeremy Child as 2nd Lieutenant
- Dennis Brennan as Corporal
- Rafael Albaicín as Chief Arab At Oasis

== Production ==
=== Development ===
The film was originally titled Written in the Sand; it was announced in October 1967 with Michael Caine to star and René Clément to direct. Caine later said he made the film because of his relationship with producer Harry Saltzman and the fact he wanted to work with Clément.

The film was also known as Deadly Patrol.

In February 1968 Richard Harris and Nigel Davenport signed to co-star, by which time the film had been re-named Play Dirty. However Richard Harris ultimately did not appear in the film.

According to de Toth, Lotte Colin did hardly any of the screenplay despite being credited. She was Saltzman's mother-in-law.

=== Filming ===
The film was originally planned by Saltzman to be filmed in Israel. Saltzman asked Andre de Toth to scout the country for locations. De Toth said Clément wanted to film in Morocco or Algeria, but Saltzman refused to go to North Africa, and Clément refused to go to Israel. The film ended up being shot on location in the Tabernas Desert near Tabernas in Almería, Spain.

Richard Harris left his home in London for Spain on 16 February 1968. He said he was handed a script which was different from the one he had agreed to do when he signed on. He quit the film and sued the producers for payment of his salary, which was a reported £150,000.

After Nigel Davenport replaced Harris, and Nigel Green replaced Davenport, René Clément resigned as director, and executive producer André de Toth took over directing the film. De Toth said Clément "wanted to make a 'poetry of war'" while Saltzman "wanted blazing guns and roaring tanks".

Several other films were shooting in Almería at the same time, including Shalako. Caine later said, "There are six sand dunes in Almeria... We'd all come round the hill chasing Rommel's tanks - and there's horse shit all over the desert and a stagecoach in the other directions being chased by Indians. The other film units were forever wiping out tank tracks to get their westerns and we were forever shovelling up horse shit and wiping out hoof prints to get our El Alamein." Caine later said he had a clause in his contracts that any film on which he worked could not be made in Almería. "It was that bad".

De Toth later said that in making the film, "I wanted to rub our noses in the mess we have created and how we shy away from our ability to clean it up... I wanted to disturb, to open closed eyes and scramble brains."

== Reception ==
The film was a box office disappointment. Critics had mixed-to-negative opinions. Stanley Eichelbaum of the San Francisco Examiner, noting the opposite attitudes to war expressed by various filmmakers—either "anti-war" or exploiting "the greater glory of war," said of Play Dirty that it "tries to satisfy both viewpoints and trips itself up badly."

In a more recent, and positive, online review, Andrew Nette wrote in March 2025 that the film was "as good if not better than The Dirty Dozen, if only for the fact (its) action thrills are layered with a hefty dollop of cynical class politics, in a way that only a British film can do."
