= GivingTales =

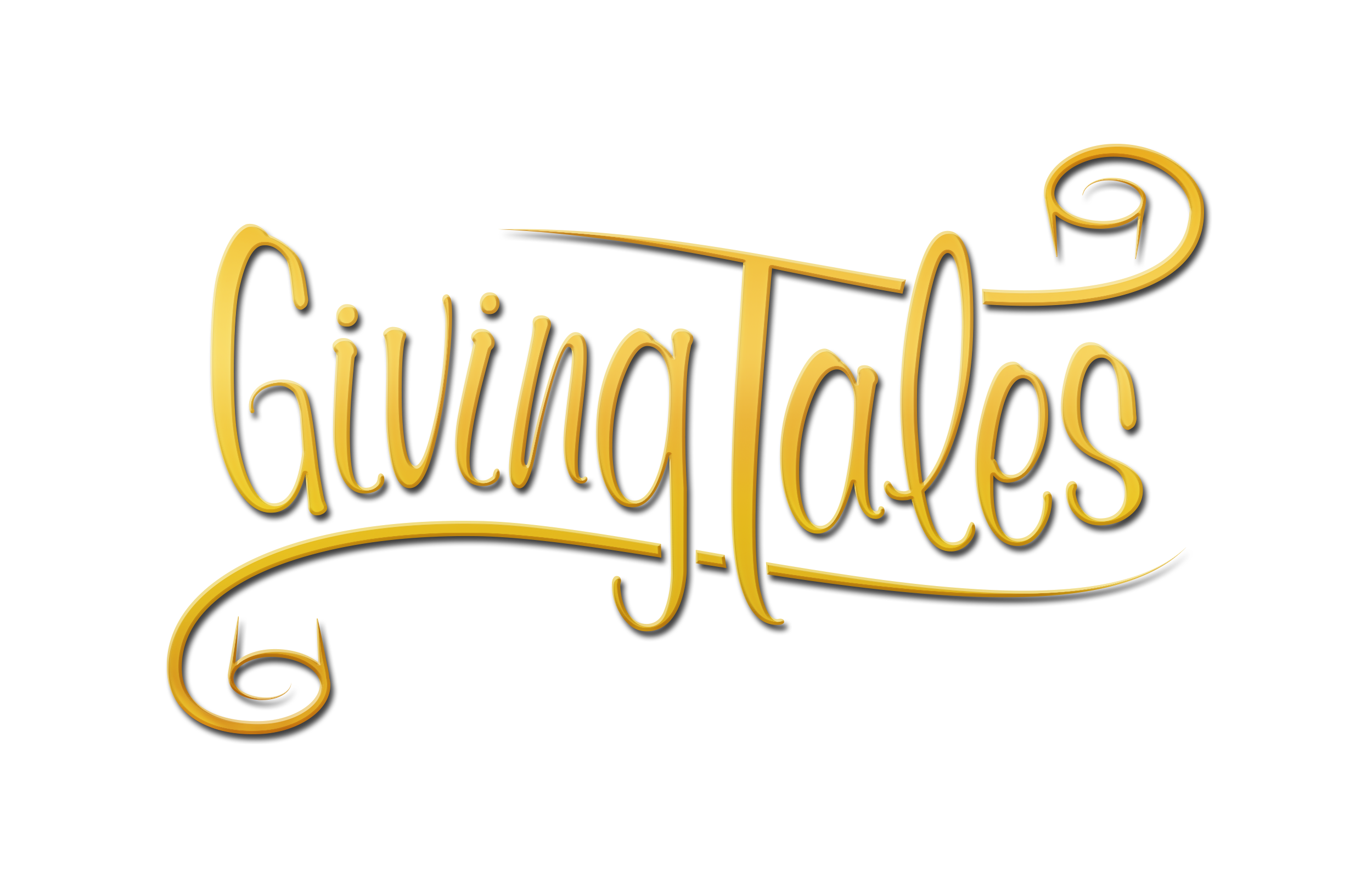
- Developer: GivingTales Kft
- Initial release: 2015
- Platform: iOS, Android, Windows 10 Mobile, Windows Phone 8, Kindle, Audible, iTunes
- Website: givingtales.com

GivingTales is a mobile application offering illustrated versions of Hans Christian Andersen's classic fairy tales. The app has been developed in association with Sir Roger Moore in 2015.

The stories are read by notable British actors, including Roger Moore, Stephen Fry, Ewan McGregor, Joan Collins, Joanna Lumley, Michael Caine, David Walliams, Charlotte Rampling, Paul McKenna and Michael Ball.

Subtitles are provided for users to read along with the narrators. The language of the subtitle can be chosen from the following: Arabic, Chinese, English, French, German, Italian and Spanish.

The stories are available in various formats including apps, audios and videos.

In December 2017, the first localized version of GivingTales was released under the name of "Fantastiske Fortællinger". The fairy tales are narrated by famous Danish actors, including Cecilie Stenspil, Alexandre Willaume, Bubber, Kurt Ravn, Jens Jørn Spottag, Lars Mikkelsen, Sofie Gråbøl, Anne Marie Helger, Nikolaj Coster-Waldau and Birgitte Hjort Sørensen.

== List of stories ==
- The Princess and the Pea (Prindsessen paa Ærten) by Roger Moore
- The Little Match Girl (Den lille Pige med Svovlstikkerne) Ewan McGregor
- The Ugly Duckling (Den grimme ælling) by Stephen Fry
- The Emperor’s New Clothes (Keiserens nye Klæder) by Joan Collins
- The Snow Queen (Snedronningen) by Joanna Lumley
- Little Claus and Big Claus (Lille Claus og Store Claus) by Michael Caine
- The Little Mermaid (Den lille Havfrue) by David Walliams
- Thumbelina (Tommelise) by Charlotte Rampling
- It's Quite True (Det er ganske vist!) by Paul McKenna
- The Steadfast Tin Soldier (Den standhaftige Tinsoldat) by Roger Moore
- The Nightingale (Nattergalen) by Michael Ball
