= St Olave's Hospital =

- Lewisham and North Southwark District Health Authority
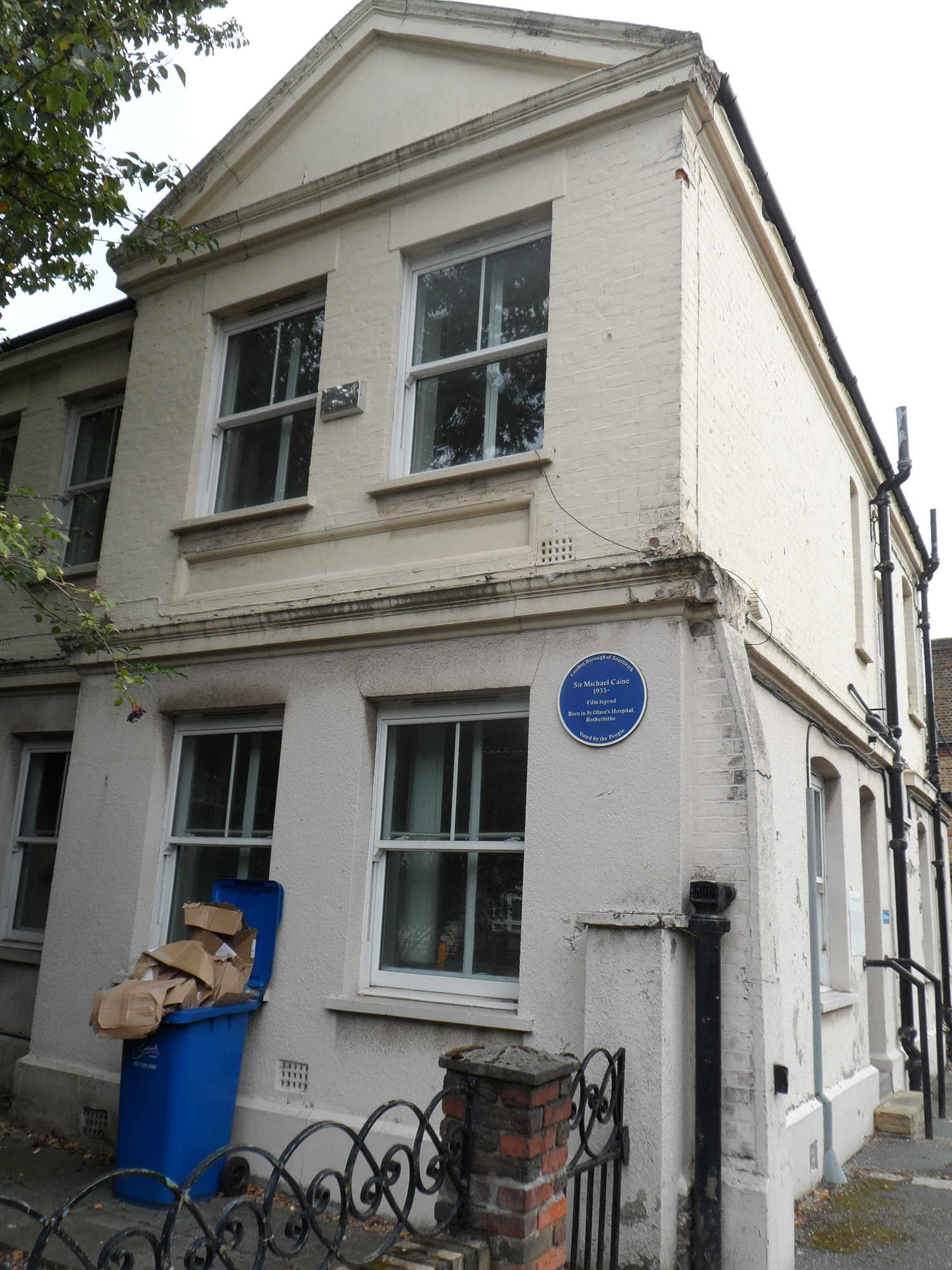
- Gatehouse at St Olave's Hospital

- Location within Southwark

Geography
- Location: Rotherhithe, London, England, United Kingdom
- Coordinates: 51°29′48″N 0°3′15″W

Organisation
- Type: General

Services
- Beds: 687

History
- Founded: 1875
- Closed: 1985

Links
- Lists: Hospitals in England

St Olave's Hospital was a general hospital serving the Rotherhithe area of London until its closure in 1985.

== History ==
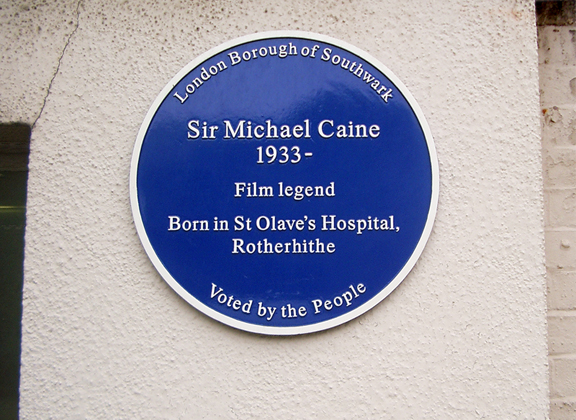
A blue plaque erected in 2003 marks the actor Michael Caine's birthplace at St Olave's Hospital.

In 1865 the Rotherhithe Workhouse was denounced in The Lancet in its demands for poor law medical reform. There was only one paid nurse, with four pauper assistants. Nurse Matilda Beeton described filth and neglect "where many sick patients were dirty, their bodies crawling with vermin". The Infirmary of St Olave's Union was established by Order of the Local Government Board in 1875.

After being known as the Bermondsey and Rotherhithe Hospital in the 1920s, the facility was renamed St Olave's Hospital in 1930 and transferred from the Bermondsey Board of Guardians to the London County Council. It had 687 beds at that time. In 1948, with the formation of the National Health Service, St Olave's came under the management of the Bermondsey and Southwark Hospital Management Committee. It finally closed in 1985. The site has since been redeveloped as a residential street known as Ann Moss Way.

The actor Michael Caine was born Maurice Joseph Micklewhite Jr. on 14 March 1933 at St Olave's Hospital, and there is a blue plaque to that effect on the former gate house at the entrance to the hospital site.
