= List of awards and nominations received by Michael Caine =

Michael Caine awards and nominations
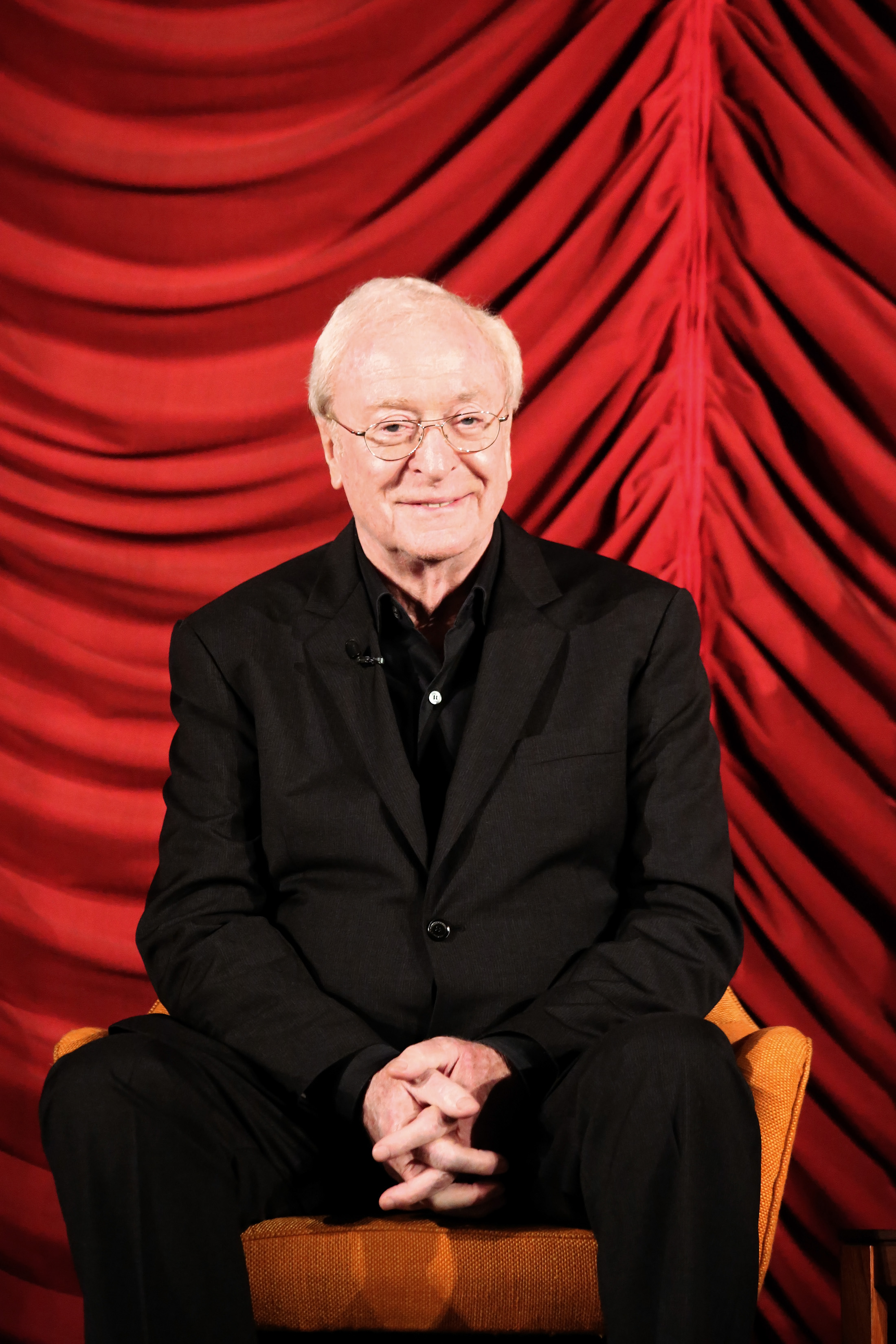
- Caine at the Vienna International Film Festival in 2012
Awards and nominations
Award	Wins	Nominations
Academy Awards	2	6
BAFTA Awards	1	8
Primetime Emmy Awards	0	3
Golden Globe Awards	3	12
Screen Actors Guild Awards	1	3

Michael Caine is an English actor known for his roles in film and television. He has received numerous accolades including two Academy Awards, a BAFTA Award, three Golden Globe Awards, and a Screen Actors Guild Award as well as nominations for three Primetime Emmy Awards.

He has been nominated for an Oscar six times, winning his first Academy Award for the 1986 film Hannah and Her Sisters, and his second in 1999 for The Cider House Rules, in both cases as a supporting actor. His performance in Educating Rita in 1983 earned him the BAFTA and Golden Globe Award for Best Actor. Caine is one of only two actors nominated for an Academy Award for acting in every decade from the 1960s to 2000s (the other one being Jack Nicholson); Laurence Olivier was also nominated for an acting Academy Award in five different decades, beginning in 1939 and ending in 1978, as has Paul Newman (1950s, '60s, '80s, '90s and 2000s) and Denzel Washington (1980s, '90s. 2000s, '10s and '20s). Caine appeared in seven films that were ranked in the BFI's 100 greatest British films of the 20th century.

Caine was appointed a Commander of the Order of the British Empire (CBE) in the 1992 Birthday Honours and in the 2000 Birthday Honours he was knighted (as Sir Maurice Micklewhite CBE) by Queen Elizabeth II at Buckingham Palace. In a tribute to his background, he stated: "I was named after my father and I was knighted in his name because I love my father. I always kept my real name—I'm a very private and family-orientated person."

In 2000 he received a BAFTA Academy Fellowship Award. In 2008, he was awarded the prize for Outstanding Contribution to Showbusiness at the Variety Club Awards. On 5 January 2011 he was made a Commander of the Ordre des Arts et des Lettres by France's culture minister, Frédéric Mitterrand. In 2012, he was awarded the Honorary Freedom of the London Borough of Southwark as a person of distinction and eminence of the borough.

== Major associations ==
=== Academy Awards ===
Year	Category	Nominated work	Result	Ref.
1967	Best Actor	Alfie	Nominated	
1973	Best Actor	Sleuth	Nominated	
1984	Best Actor	Educating Rita	Nominated	
1987	Best Supporting Actor	Hannah and Her Sisters	Won	
2000	Best Supporting Actor	The Cider House Rules	Won	
2003	Best Actor	The Quiet American	Nominated	

=== BAFTA Awards ===
Year	Category	Nominated work	Result	Ref.
British Academy Film Awards
1966	Best Actor in a Leading Role	The Ipcress File	Nominated	
1967	Best Actor in a Leading Role	Alfie	Nominated	
1984	Best Actor in a Leading Role	Educating Rita	Won (Note: Tied with Dustin Hoffman for Tootsie.)	
1984	Best Actor in a Leading Role	The Honorary Consul	Nominated	
1987	Best Actor in a Leading Role	Hannah and Her Sisters	Nominated	
1999	Best Actor in a Leading Role	Little Voice	Nominated	
2000	Best Actor in a Supporting Role	The Cider House Rules	Nominated	
2003	Best Actor in a Leading Role	The Quiet American	Nominated	

=== Emmy Awards ===
Year	Category	Nominated work	Result	Ref.
Primetime Emmy Awards
1990	Outstanding Lead Actor - Miniseries or a Movie	Jekyll & Hyde	Nominated	
1994	Outstanding Lead Actor - Miniseries or a Movie	World War II: When Lions Roared	Nominated	
1997	Outstanding Supporting Actor - Miniseries or a Movie	Mandela and de Klerk	Nominated	

=== Golden Globe Awards ===
Year	Category	Nominated work	Result	Ref.
1967	Best Actor – Motion Picture Drama	Alfie	Nominated	
1967	Best Actor – Motion Picture Musical or Comedy	Gambit	Nominated	
1973	Best Actor – Motion Picture Drama	Sleuth	Nominated	
1984	Best Actor – Motion Picture Musical or Comedy	Educating Rita	Won	
1987	Best Supporting Actor – Motion Picture	Hannah and Her Sisters	Nominated	
1989	Best Actor – Motion Picture Musical or Comedy	Dirty Rotten Scoundrels	Nominated	
1989	Best Actor – Miniseries or Television Film	Jack the Ripper	Won (Note: Tied with Stacy Keach for Hemingway.)	
1991	Best Actor – Miniseries or Television Film	Jekyll & Hyde	Nominated	
1998	Best Actor – Miniseries or Television Film	Mandela and de Klerk	Nominated	
1999	Best Actor – Motion Picture Musical or Comedy	Little Voice	Won	
2000	Best Supporting Actor – Motion Picture	The Cider House Rules	Nominated	
2003	Best Actor – Motion Picture Drama	The Quiet American	Nominated	

=== Screen Actors Guild Awards ===
Year	Category	Nominated work	Result	Ref.
1998	Outstanding Cast in a Motion Picture	Little Voice	Nominated	
1999	Outstanding Cast in a Motion Picture	The Cider House Rules	Nominated	
1999	Outstanding Actor in a Supporting Role	The Cider House Rules	Won	

== Critics awards ==
Organizations	Year	Category	Work	Result	Ref.
Central Ohio Film Critics Association	2008	Best Ensemble	The Dark Knight	Won	
Central Ohio Film Critics Association	2010	Best Ensemble	Inception	Nominated	
Chicago Film Critics Association	1998	Best Supporting Actor	Little Voice	Nominated	
Critics' Choice Movie Awards	2008	Best Acting Ensemble	The Dark Knight	Nominated	
Detroit Film Critics Society	2015	Best Actor	Youth	Won	
Kansas City Film Critics Circle	1966	Best Actor	Alfie	Won	
London Film Critics' Circle	1998	British Supporting Actor of the Year	Little Voice	Won	
London Film Critics' Circle	2000	British Supporting Actor of the Year	Quills	Nominated	
London Film Critics' Circle	2002	Best Actor	The Quiet American	Won	
London Film Critics' Circle	2006	British Supporting Actor of the Year	The Prestige	Won	
Los Angeles Film Critics Association	1986	Best Supporting Actor	Hannah and Her Sisters	Nominated	
Los Angeles Film Critics Association	1986	Best Supporting Actor	Mona Lisa	Nominated	
National Board of Review	2001	Best Cast	Last Orders	Won	
National Society of Film Critics	1966	Best Actor	Alfie	Won	
National Society of Film Critics	2002	Best Actor	The Quiet American	Nominated	
Phoenix Film Critics Society	2010	Best Cast	Inception	Nominated	
San Francisco Film Critics Circle	2002	Best Actor	The Quiet American	Won	
Seattle Film Critics Awards	2002	Best Actor	The Quiet American	Nominated	
Washington D.C. Area Film Critics Association	2010	Best Ensemble	Inception	Nominated	

== Miscellaneous accolades ==
Organizations	Year	Category	Work	Result	Ref.
Bangkok International Film Festival	2002	Best Performance by a Leading Actor	The Quiet American	Won	
British Independent Film Awards	1998	Best Lead Actor	Little Voice	Nominated	
David di Donatello Awards	1986	Best Foreign Actor	Hannah and Her Sisters	Nominated	
European Film Awards	2001	European Film Award	Last Orders	Nominated	
European Film Awards	2015	Best Actor	Youth	Won	
Empire Awards	1999	Best British Actor	The Cider House Rules	Nominated	
Empire Awards	2009	Best Actor	Harry Brown	Nominated	
Evening Standard British Film Awards	1972	Best Actor	Sleuth	Won	
Golden Raspberry Awards	1980	Worst Actor	Dressed to Kill	Nominated	
Golden Raspberry Awards	1980	Worst Actor	The Island	Nominated	
Golden Raspberry Awards	1987	Worst Supporting Actor	Jaws: The Revenge	Nominated	
People's Choice Awards	2008	People's Choice Award for Favorite Cast	The Dark Knight	Won	
Red Sea International Film Festival	2025	Lifetime Achievement Award	—	Won	
San Sebastián International Film Festival	1996	Best Actor	Blood and Wine	Won	
Satellite Awards	1998	Best Actor – Motion Picture Musical or Comedy	Little Voice	Nominated	
Satellite Awards	1999	Best Supporting Actor – Motion Picture	The Cider House Rules	Nominated	
Satellite Awards	2002	Best Actor – Motion Picture Drama (tied with Daniel Day-Lewis for Gangs of New York)	The Quiet American	Won	
Scream Awards	2008	Best Supporting Actor	The Dark Knight	Nominated	
Scream Awards	2010	Best Cameo	Inception	Nominated	

== Honorary awards ==
Organizations	Year	Award	Result	Ref.
Commander of the Order of the British Empire	1992	Medal	Honored	
Knighted	2000	Medal	Honored	
BAFTA Fellowship	2000	Statue	Honored	
Commander of the Ordre des Arts et des Lettres	2011	Medal	Honored	
