= The Compartment =

1961 British TV drama

- Written by: Johnny Speight
- Directed by: John McGrath
- Starring: Michael Caine; Frank Finlay

Original release
- Release: 22 August 1961

The Compartment is a 1961 British TV drama. Written by Johnny Speight, it was a two-hander starring Michael Caine and Frank Finlay. Caine played a young beatnik musician and Finlay played a middle-aged businessman. The two characters are confined to a train compartment together on a half-hour journey and Caine's musician begins to resent the older man.

The play was crucial to Michael Caine's career because it was highly acclaimed and increased his visibility. It also led to him being signed by a new agent, Denis Selinger, and to being offered a number of other TV jobs.

According to Caine, there is no existing recording of this programme. The BBC told him that the tape used for the broadcast was re-used, a common practice on some networks in the early days of television.

A version starring Marty Feldman is available on YouTube.
