= Michael Caine =

English retired actor (born 1933)

Sir Michael Caine CBE
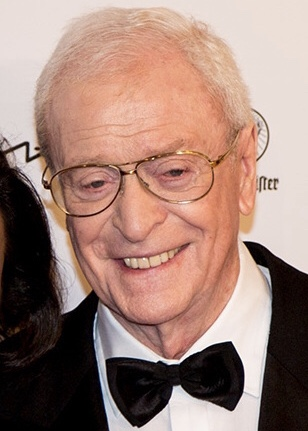
- Caine in 2015
- Born: Maurice Joseph Micklewhite; 14 March 1933 (age 93); London, England
- Occupation: Actor
- Years active: 1950–2023
- Works: Filmography
- Spouses: Patricia Haines (m. 1954; div. 1958); Shakira Baksh (m. 1973)
- Children: 2
- Relatives: Stanley Caine (brother)
- Awards: Full list
- Military Service
- Allegiance: United Kingdom
- Branch: British Army
- Service years: 1951–1953
- Rank: Private
- Unit: C Company, 1st Royal Fusiliers
- Conflicts: Korean War
- Awards: Korea Medal; UN Korea Medal
- Michael Caine's voice from the BBC programme Front Row Interviews, 29 September 2010.
- Website: michaelcaine.com

Signature
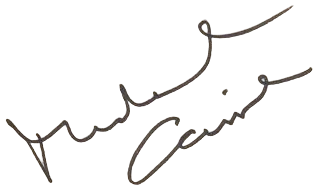

Sir Michael Caine (born Maurice Joseph Micklewhite; 14 March 1933) is an English retired actor. Known for his distinctive Cockney accent, he has appeared in more than 130 films over a career that spanned eight decades and is considered a British cultural icon. He has received numerous awards including two Academy Awards, a BAFTA Award, three Golden Globe Awards, and a Screen Actors Guild Award. As of 2017, the films in which Caine has appeared have grossed over $7.8 billion worldwide. Caine is one of only five male actors to be nominated for an Academy Award for acting in five different decades. (Note: The others are Laurence Olivier, Paul Newman, Jack Nicholson and Denzel Washington.) In 2000, he received a BAFTA Fellowship and was knighted by Queen Elizabeth II.

Often playing a Cockney, Caine made his breakthrough in the 1960s with starring roles in British films such as Zulu (1964), The Ipcress File (1965), The Italian Job (1969), and Battle of Britain (1969). During this time he established a distinctive visual style wearing thick horn-rimmed glasses combined with sharp suits and a laconic vocal delivery; he was recognised as a style icon of the 1960s. He solidified his stardom with roles in Get Carter (1971), The Last Valley (1971), The Man Who Would Be King (1975), The Eagle Has Landed (1976), and A Bridge Too Far (1977).

Caine received two Academy Awards for Best Supporting Actor for his roles as Elliot in Woody Allen's dramedy Hannah and Her Sisters (1986), and as Dr. Wilbur Larch in Lasse Hallström's drama The Cider House Rules (1999). His other Oscar-nominated film roles were in Alfie (1966), Sleuth (1972), Educating Rita (1983), and The Quiet American (2002)—all four of which were for Best Actor. Other notable films include California Suite (1978), Dressed to Kill (1980), Mona Lisa (1986), Little Voice (1998), Quills (2000), Children of Men (2006), Harry Brown (2009), and Youth (2015).

Caine is also known for his performance as Ebenezer Scrooge in The Muppet Christmas Carol (1992), and for his comedic roles in Dirty Rotten Scoundrels (1988), Miss Congeniality (2000), Austin Powers in Goldmember (2002), and Secondhand Lions (2003). Caine portrayed Alfred Pennyworth in Christopher Nolan's Batman trilogy (2005–2012), and acted in five other Nolan films: The Prestige (2006), Inception (2010), Interstellar (2014), Dunkirk (2017), and Tenet (2020). He announced his retirement from acting, with his final film being The Great Escaper (2023).

== Early life ==
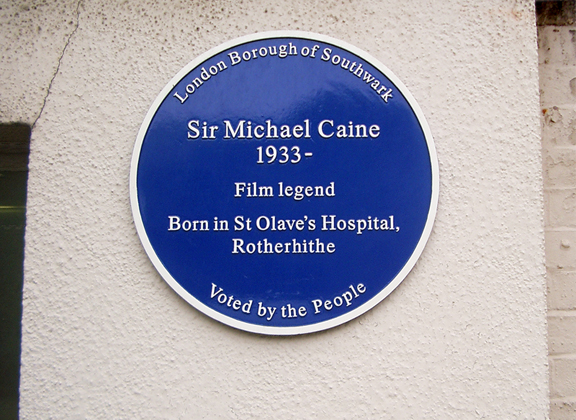
Blue plaque marking Caine's birthplace at St Olave's Hospital in Rotherhithe, south-east London

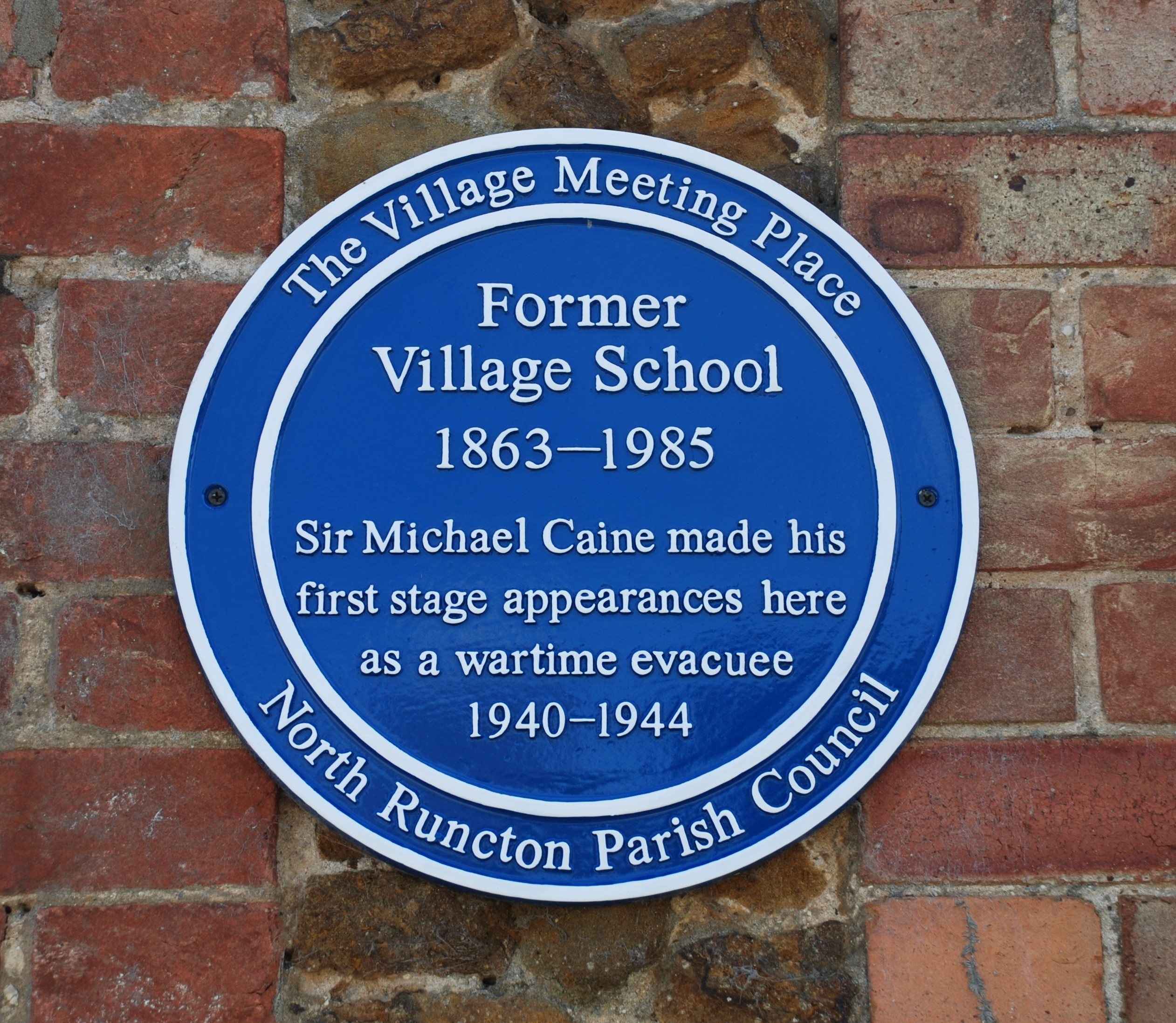
Blue plaque at the former school in North Runcton where, as a wartime evacuee, Caine made his stage debut

Michael Caine was born Maurice Joseph Micklewhite at St Olave's Hospital in the Rotherhithe district of London on 14 March 1933, (Note: Rotherhithe did not become part of the London Borough of Southwark until its creation in 1965. In 1933, it was part of the Metropolitan Borough of Bermondsey in the County of London (abolished 1965).) the son of cook and charwoman Ellen Frances Marie (née Burchell; 1900–1989) and a fish market porter also called Maurice Joseph Micklewhite (1899–1956). His father was Catholic. An article in The Irish Times says that Caine's father was from an Irish Traveller family background, but Caine himself said, including on an episode of Inside the Actors Studio, that his father had Gypsy roots. Caine was raised in his mother's Protestant religion. He had a younger brother, Stanley (1935–2013), who also became an actor, and an older maternal half-brother named David Burchell. He grew up in London's Southwark district; during the Second World War, he was evacuated 100 miles (160 km) to North Runcton, Norfolk, where he made his acting debut at the village school and had a pet horse called Lottie.

After the war, Caine's father was demobilised and the family were rehoused by the council in Marshall Gardens in London's Elephant and Castle area, where they lived in a prefabricated house made in Canada as much of London's housing stock had been destroyed during the Blitz in 1940 and 1941. Caine later wrote in his autobiography, "The prefabs, as they were known, were intended to be temporary homes while London was reconstructed, but we ended up living there for eighteen years—and for us, after a cramped flat with an outside toilet, it was luxury."

At the age of ten, Caine acted in a school play as the father of the ugly sisters in Cinderella. His trousers' zipper was undone, prompting the audience to laugh, which inspired him to pursue an acting career. In 1944, he passed his eleven-plus examination, winning a scholarship to Hackney Downs School. (Note: For an account of his evacuation and early school years, see the March 2009 newsletter of The Clove Club. This account is as sent to Jerry Pam, a fellow Hackney Downs pupil, six years Caine's senior, whom he met in the 1950s. Pam became Caine's publicist, fulfilling that role for "over 50 years".) After a year there, he moved to Wilson's School in Camberwell, which he left at age 16 after gaining School Certificates in six subjects. He then worked briefly as a filing clerk and messenger for a film company in Victoria, London and film producer Jay Lewis on Wardour Street.

== Military service ==
In 1951, Caine was called up to do his national service with the British Army. After basic training and 12 months in the Queen's Royal Regiment, from 1952 he served with the Royal Fusiliers, first at the British Army of the Rhine Headquarters in Iserlohn, West Germany, and then on active service in the Korean War. Having contracted malaria, he was sent home in 1953 and discharged from the service.

Caine, seeing first-hand how the Chinese used human wave tactics, was left with the sense that the communist Maoist government did not care about its citizens. Having been previously sympathetic towards the ideals of communism, Caine was left repelled by it. He experienced a situation in which he thought he was going to die, the memory of which stayed with him and "formed his character". In his 2010 autobiography The Elephant to Hollywood, he wrote that "The rest of my life I have lived every bloody moment from the moment I wake up until the time I go to sleep."

Caine has said that he would like to see the return of national service in Britain, to help combat youth violence, stating: "I'm just saying, put them in the Army for six months. You're there to learn how to defend your country. You belong to the country. Then, when you come out, you have a sense of belonging, rather than a sense of violence."

== Acting career ==
=== 1950–1963: Acting debut and early roles ===
Caine's film debut was an uncredited walk-on role in Morning Departure (1950). A few years later in Horsham, Sussex, he responded to an advertisement in The Stage for an assistant stage manager who would also perform bit parts for the Horsham-based Westminster Repertory Company, who were performing at the Carfax Electric Theatre. Adopting the stage name Michael Scott, in July 1953 he was cast as the drunkard Hindley in the company's production of Wuthering Heights. He moved to the Lowestoft Repertory Company in Suffolk for a year when he was 21. It was here that he met his first wife, Patricia Haines. He has described the first nine years of his career as "really, really brutal" as well as "more like purgatory than paradise". He appeared in nine plays during his time at the Lowestoft Rep at the Arcadia Theatre with Jackson Stanley's Standard Players.

When his career took him to London in 1954 after his provincial apprenticeship, his agent informed him that there was already a Michael Scott performing as an actor in London and that he had to come up with a new name immediately. Speaking to his agent from a telephone booth in Leicester Square, London, he looked around for inspiration, noted that The Caine Mutiny was being shown at the Odeon Cinema, and decided to change his name to Michael Caine. He joked on television in 1987 that, had a tree partly blocking his view been a few feet to the left, he might have been called "Michael Mutiny". He also later joked in interviews that, had he looked the other way, he would have ended up as "Michael One Hundred and One Dalmatians". In 1958, Caine played the minor role of a court orderly in a BBC Television adaptation of the story, The Caine Mutiny Court-Martial.

Caine moved in with another rising cockney actor, Terence Stamp, and began hanging out with him and Peter O'Toole in the London party scene after he had become O'Toole's understudy in Lindsay Anderson's West End staging of Willis Hall's The Long and the Short and the Tall in 1959. Caine took over the role when O'Toole left to make Lawrence of Arabia and went on to a four-month tour of the UK and Ireland. Caine's first film role was as one of the privates in George Baker's platoon in the 1956 film A Hill in Korea. The stars of the film were Baker, Harry Andrews, Stanley Baker and Michael Medwin, with Stephen Boyd and Ronald Lewis; Robert Shaw also had a small part. Caine also appeared regularly on television in small roles. His first credited role on the BBC was in 1956, where he played Boudousse in the Jean Anouilh play The Lark. Other parts included three roles in Dixon of Dock Green in 1957, 1958 and 1959, prisoner-of-war series Escape (1957), and the crime/thriller drama Mister Charlesworth (1958).

Caine continued to appear on television, in serials The Golden Girl and No Wreath for the General, but was then cast in the play The Compartment, written by Johnny Speight, a two-hander also starring Frank Finlay. This was followed by main roles in other plays including the character Tosh in Somewhere for the Night, a Sunday-Night Play written by Bill Naughton televised on Sunday 3 December 1961, another two-hander by Johnny Speight, The Playmates, and two editions of BBC plays strand First Night, Funny Noises with Their Mouths and The Way with Reggie (both 1963). He also acted in radio plays, including Bill Naughton's Looking for Frankie on the BBC Home Service (1963). A big break came for Caine when he was cast as Meff in James Saunders' Cockney comedy Next Time I'll Sing To You, when this play was presented at the New Arts Theatre in London on 23 January 1963. Scenes from the play's performance were featured in the April 1963 issue of Theatre World magazine.

=== 1964–1975: Stardom and acclaim ===
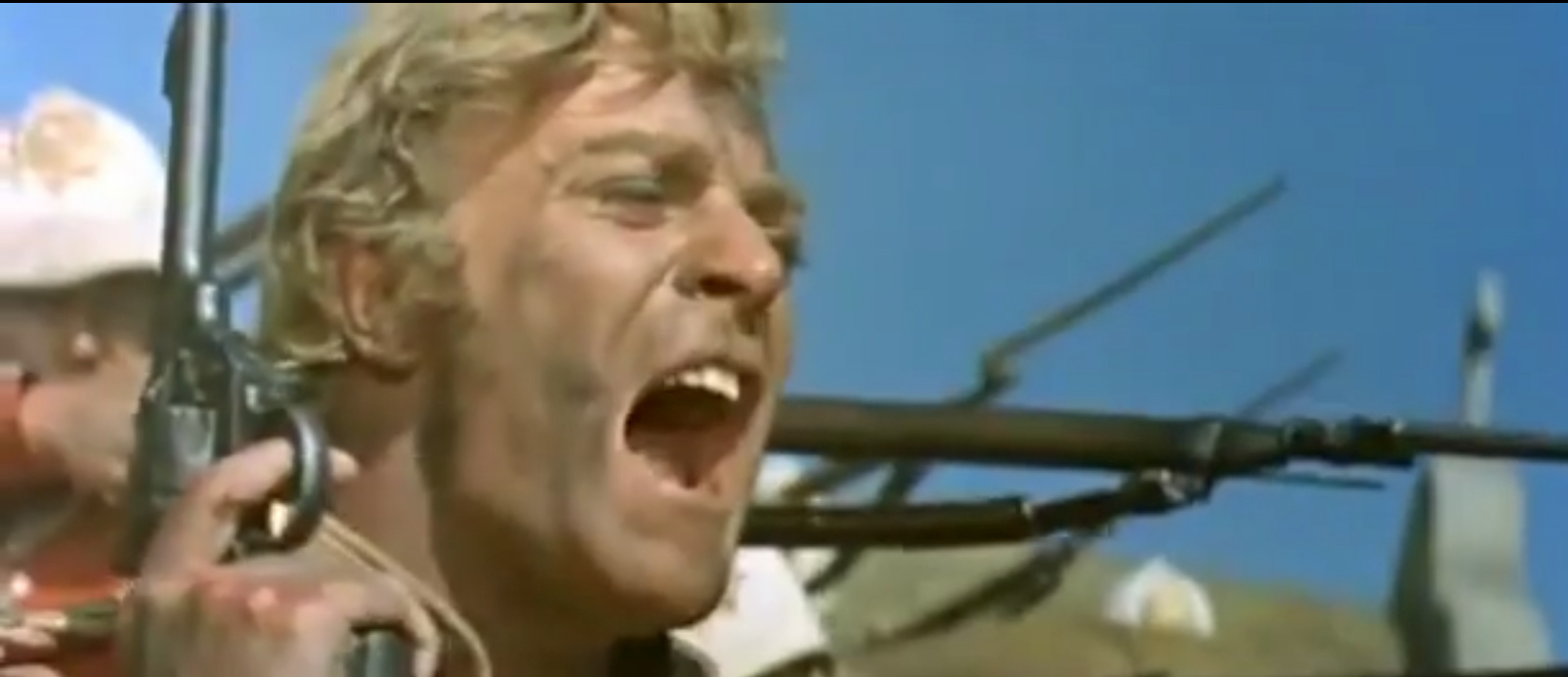
Caine in the trailer for Zulu (1964)

When this play moved to the Criterion in Piccadilly with Michael Codron directing, he was visited backstage by Stanley Baker, one of the four stars in Caine's first film, A Hill in Korea, who told him about the part of a Cockney private in his upcoming film Zulu, a film Baker was producing and starring in. Baker told Caine to meet the director, Cy Endfield, who informed him that he had already given the part to James Booth, a fellow Cockney who was Caine's friend, because he "looked more Cockney" than Caine did. Endfield then told the 6 feet 2 inches (1.88 m) tall Caine that he did not look like a Cockney but like an officer, and offered him a screen test for the role of a snobbish, upper class officer after Caine assured him that he could do a posh accent. Caine believes Endfield offered him, a Cockney, the role of an aristocrat because, being American, he did not have the endemic British class-prejudice. Though he tested poorly, Endfield gave him the part that would make him a film star.

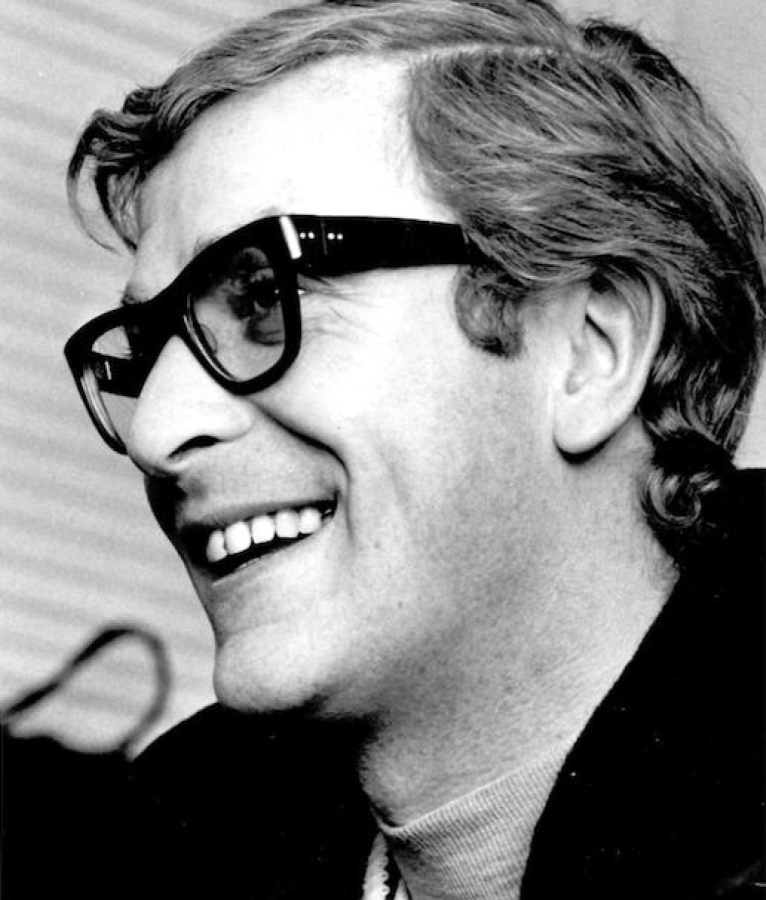
Caine during filming in 1967 in his third outing as crook-turned-spy Harry Palmer

Location shooting for Zulu took place in Natal, South Africa, for 14 weeks in 1963. According to his 2010 autobiography The Elephant to Hollywood, Caine had been signed to a seven-year contract by Joseph E. Levine, whose Embassy Films was distributing Zulu. After the return of the cast to England and the completion of the film, Levine released him from the contract, telling him, "I know you're not, but you gotta face the fact that you look like a queer on screen." Levine gave his contract to his Zulu co-star James Booth. Subsequently, Caine's agent got him cast in the BBC production Hamlet at Elsinore (1964) as Horatio, in support of Christopher Plummer's Hamlet. Horatio was the only classical role which Caine, who had never received dramatic training, would ever play. Caine wrote, " ... I decided that if my on-screen appearance was going to be an issue, then I would use it to bring out all Horatio's ambiguous sexuality."

Caine's roles as effete-seeming aristocrats were to contrast with his next projects, in which he was to become notable for using a regional accent, rather than the Received Pronunciation then considered proper for film actors. At that time his working-class Cockney speech stood out to American and British audiences alike, as did the Beatles' Liverpudlian accents. Zulu was followed by two of Caine's best-known roles: the rough-edged petty-crook-turned-spy Harry Palmer in The Ipcress File (1965) and the titular womanising young Cockney in Alfie (1966). In a 2016 interview Caine cited Alfie as his favourite film of his career, saying, "it made me a star in America as well, and it was my first nomination for an Academy Award". He went on to play Harry Palmer in a further four films, Funeral in Berlin (1966), Billion Dollar Brain (1967), Bullet to Beijing (1995) and Midnight in Saint Petersburg (1996). Caine made his first film in Hollywood in 1966, after an invitation from Shirley MacLaine to play opposite her in Gambit. During the first two weeks, whilst staying at the Beverly Hills Hotel, he met long-term friends John Wayne and agent "Swifty" Lazar. Wayne was a fan of Caine's performance in Alfie and suggested to Caine, "Speak slow and speak low". Caine was always grateful for that advice. Caine starred in the film The Magus (1968) which, although BAFTA-nominated for Best Cinematography, failed at the box office.

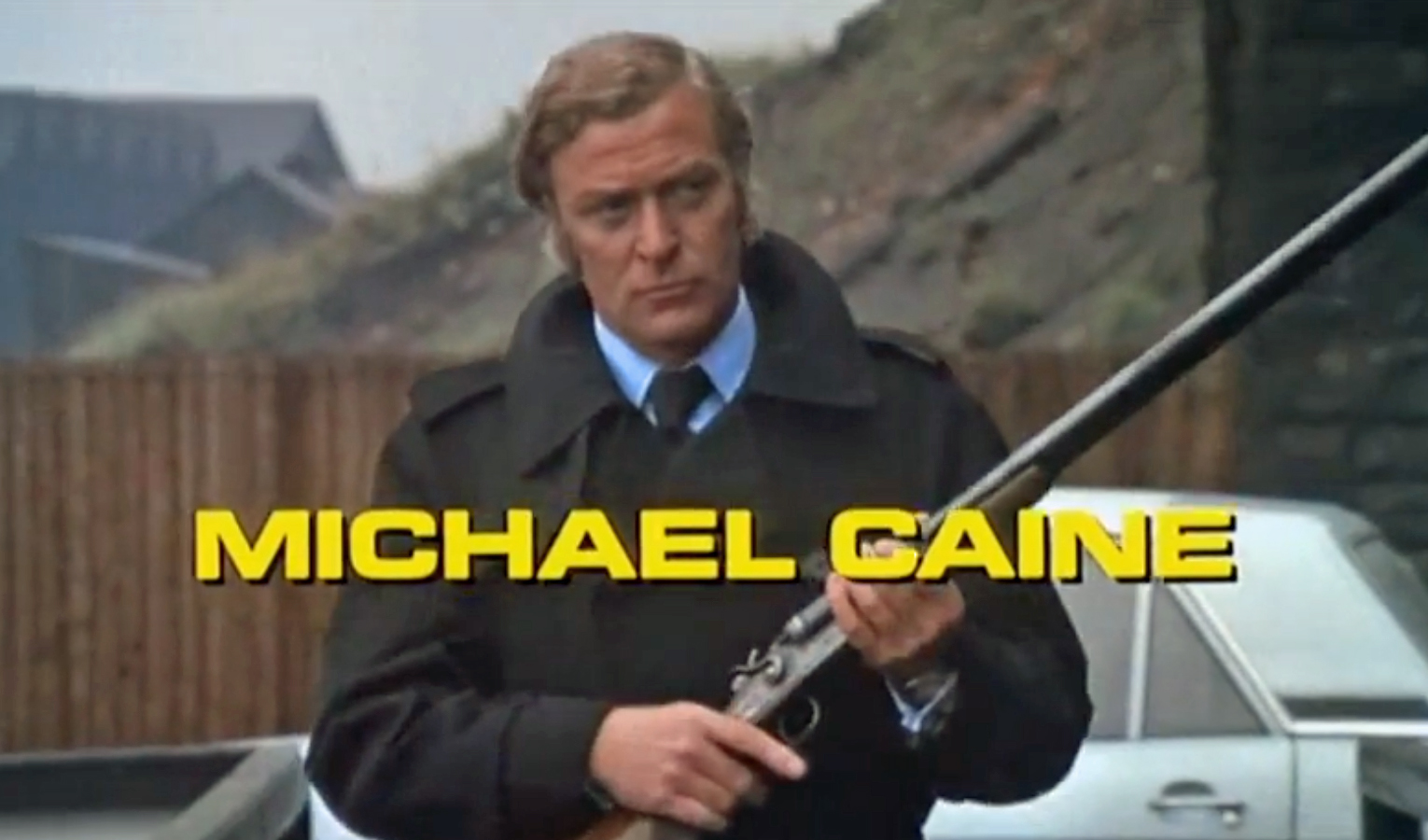
Caine in the trailer for Get Carter (1971)

Caine starred in the 1969 comedy caper film The Italian Job as Charlie Croker, the leader of a Cockney criminal gang released from prison with the intention of doing a "big job" in Italy to steal gold bullion from an armoured security truck. One of the most celebrated roles of his career, in a 2002 poll his line "You're only supposed to blow the bloody doors off!" was voted the second-funniest line in film (after "He's not the Messiah, he's a very naughty boy" from Monty Python's Life of Brian), and favourite one-liner in a 2003 poll of 1,000 film fans. Culminating in a cliffhanger, The Italian Job has one of the most discussed end scenes in film; what happened to the coachload of gold teetering over the edge of a cliff has been debated in the decades since the film was released.

After working on The Italian Job with Noël Coward, and a role as RAF fighter pilot squadron leader Canfield in the all-star cast of Battle of Britain (both 1969), Caine played the lead in Get Carter (1971), a British gangster film. Caine also starred in a comedy thriller, Pulp (1972). Caine continued with successes including Sleuth (1972) opposite Laurence Olivier, and John Huston's The Man Who Would Be King (1975) co-starring Sean Connery, which received widespread acclaim. Martyn Palmer of The Times applauded the "lovely double act of Caine and Connery, clowning to their doom", while Huston paid tribute to Caine's improvisation as an actor: "Michael is one of the most intelligent men among the artists I've known. I don't particularly care to throw the ball to an actor and let him improvise, but with Michael it's different. I just let him get on with it." In 1974, Caine appeared in The Black Windmill, co-starring Donald Pleasence.

=== 1976–1997: Established star ===
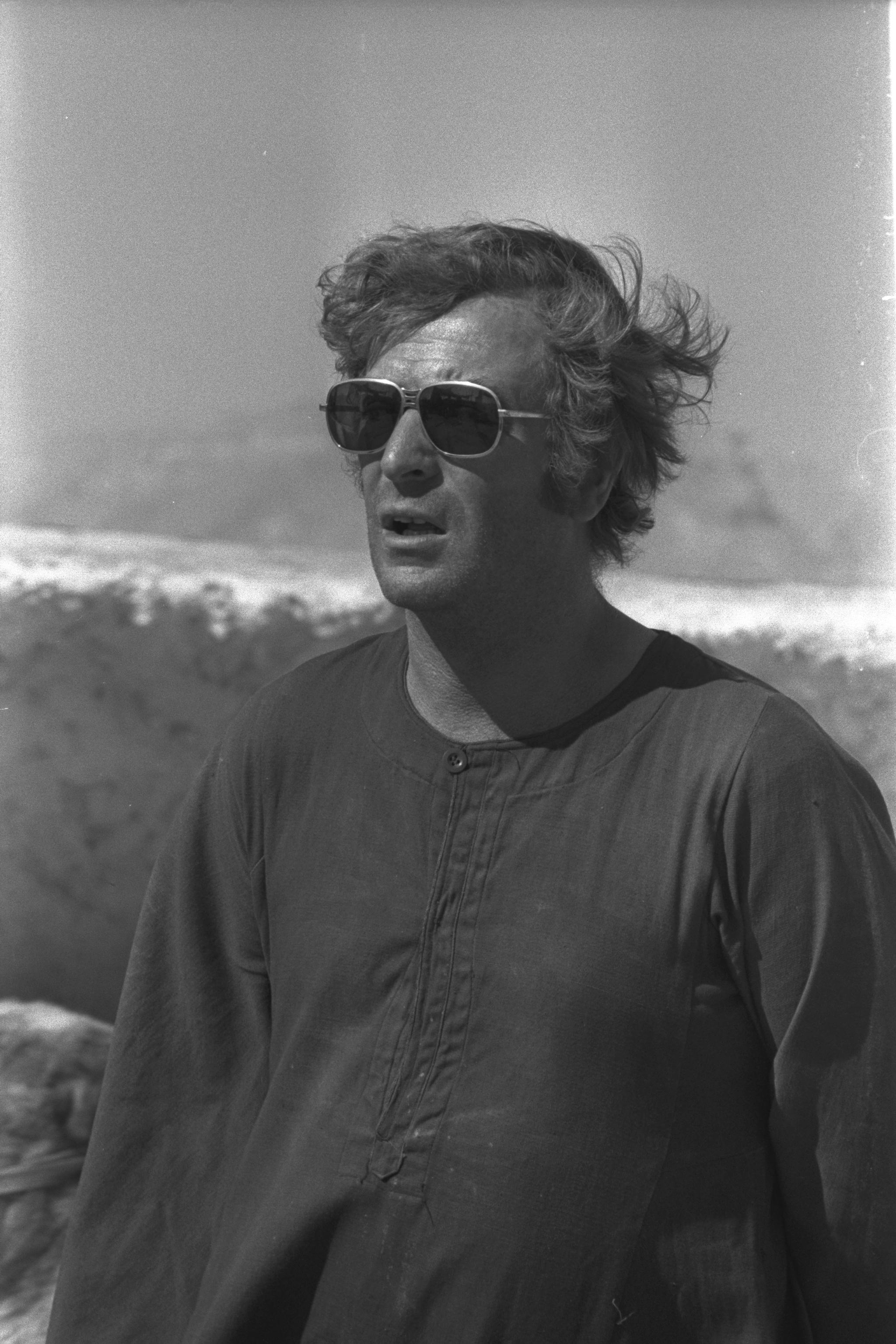
Caine in Ashanti

In 1976, Caine appeared in Tom Mankiewicz's screen adaptation of the Jack Higgins novel The Eagle Has Landed as Oberst (Colonel) Kurt Steiner, the commander of a Luftwaffe paratroop unit disguised as Polish paratroopers, whose mission was to kidnap or kill the then-British Prime Minister Winston Churchill, alongside co-stars Donald Sutherland, Robert Duvall, Jenny Agutter and Donald Pleasence. Caine also was part of an all-star cast in A Bridge Too Far (1977). In 1978, Caine starred in Silver Bears, an adaptation of Paul Erdman's 1974 novel of the same name, and co-starred in the Academy Award-winning California Suite. In the late 1970s, Caine's choice of roles was frequently criticised—something to which he has referred with self-deprecating comments about taking parts strictly for the money. He averaged two films a year, but these included such films as The Swarm (1978) (although critically panned it was Academy Award-nominated for Best Costume Design), Ashanti (1979) and Beyond the Poseidon Adventure (1979).

In the early 1980s Caine appeared in The Island (1980), The Hand (1981), and had a reunion with his Sleuth co-star Laurence Olivier in The Jigsaw Man (1982). During the 1980s Caine enjoyed further acclaimed roles and awards attention. He co-starred with Julie Walters in Educating Rita (1983), for which he won a BAFTA and a Golden Globe Award. In 1986, he portrayed the neurotic Elliot in Woody Allen's ensemble comedy Hannah and Her Sisters, starring Barbara Hershey, Dianne Wiest, and Mia Farrow. For his performance he won his first Academy Award for Best Supporting Actor. Peter Bradshaw of The Guardian wrote in 2011, "Caine's performance, so fervent, so agonisingly dedicated, actually gains in force and touching sincerity with the years." Caine also played a suave English conman, opposite a clumsy American played by Steve Martin, in the crime comedy Dirty Rotten Scoundrels (1988), directed by Frank Oz. The film earned him a Golden Globe Award for Best Actor – Motion Picture Musical or Comedy nomination, losing to Tom Hanks in Big (1988).

Caine's other successful films (critically or financially) were the 1980 Golden Globe-nominated slasher film Dressed to Kill, the 1981 war film Escape to Victory featuring Sylvester Stallone and footballers from the 1960s and 1970s, including Pelé and Bobby Moore, the 1982 film Deathtrap, and Mona Lisa (1986). In 1987, Caine narrated Hero, the official film of the 1986 FIFA World Cup. That year he starred in the thriller and spy film The Fourth Protocol alongside Pierce Brosnan. In 1988 he played Chief Insp. Frederick Abberline in the two-part TV drama Jack the Ripper, which co-starred Jane Seymour and was produced to coincide with the 100th anniversary of the Jack the Ripper murder spree in Victorian London. Despite his success in the 1980s, Caine also appeared in some poorly received films such as Blame It on Rio (1984), the Dick Clement and Ian La Frenais comedy Water (1985), the fourth and final film in the Jaws franchise, Jaws: The Revenge (1987), and Without a Clue (1988) (portraying Sherlock Holmes). Caine's commitment to filming Jaws: The Revenge in the Bahamas meant that he was unable to receive his Academy Award for Hannah and Her Sisters in person and Dianne Wiest accepted it on his behalf. Caine said of Jaws: The Revenge, "I have never seen the film, but by all accounts it was terrible. However, I have seen the house that it built, and it is terrific."

"It was absolutely perfect at that time for what I wanted. I could make it, and my daughter could see it. That's why I did it. And it was lovely."

— Caine on playing Ebenezer Scrooge in The Muppet Christmas Carol.

In the 1990s, Caine found good parts harder to come by. He played the mysterious bartender Mike in Mr. Destiny in 1990 and appeared with Roger Moore in Bullseye! (1990). He played Ebenezer Scrooge in The Muppet Christmas Carol (1992). Having been chosen by Brian Henson, Caine stated: "I'm going to play this movie like I'm working with the Royal Shakespeare Company. I will never wink, I will never do anything Muppety. I am going to play Scrooge as if it is an utterly dramatic role and there are no puppets around me." He played the beleaguered stage director Lloyd Fellowes in the film adaptation of Noises Off (1992). He also played a villain in the Steven Seagal film On Deadly Ground (1994). He starred in two straight to video Harry Palmer sequels and a few television films.

=== 1998–2014: Career resurgence ===
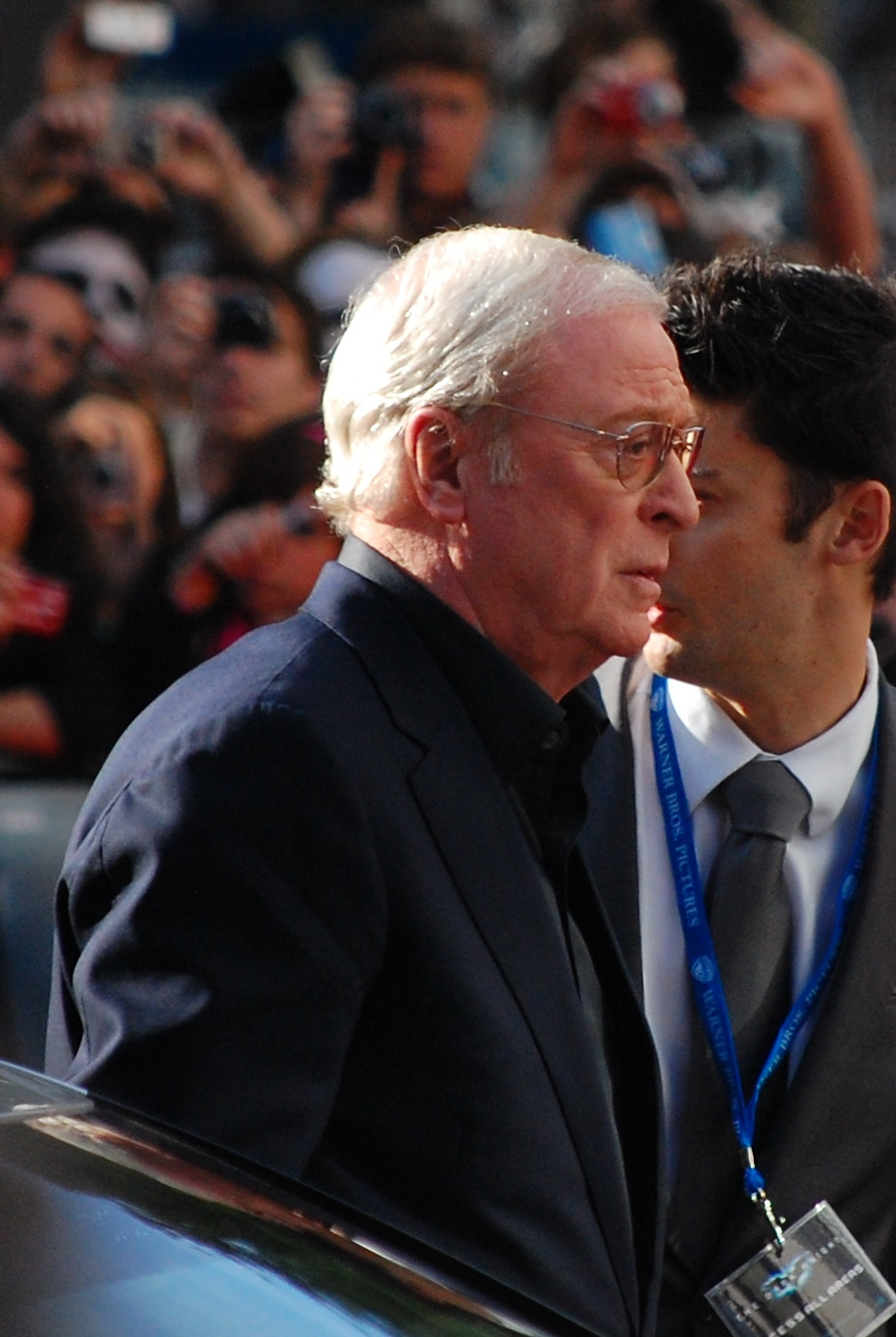
Caine in London at the European premiere of The Dark Knight, July 2008

Caine's performance in Little Voice (1998) won him a Golden Globe Award. Better parts followed, including The Cider House Rules (1999), for which he won his second Academy Award for Best Supporting Actor. In the 2000s, Caine appeared in the comedy Miss Congeniality (2000) as the refined pageant coach opposite Sandra Bullock as the undercover FBI agent. The film was a massive box office success and Caine earned praise for his comic turn. That same year Caine also appeared in Philip Kaufman's controversial yet acclaimed film Quills (2000) as Dr. Royer-Collard opposite Geoffrey Rush, Kate Winslet, and Joaquin Phoenix. In 2001, Caine starred in the ensemble dramedy Last Orders starring Helen Mirren, Bob Hoskins, and Tom Courtenay. Caine's next film The Quiet American (2002) won him great critical acclaim with Roger Ebert writing, "[it's] a performance that seems to descend perfectly formed. There is no artifice in it, no unneeded energy, no tricks, no effort". Caine earned his sixth Academy Award nomination as well as a Golden Globe Award and British Academy Film Award for his performance.

Several of Caine's classic films have been remade, including The Italian Job, Get Carter, Alfie and Sleuth. Caine appeared in Get Carter the 2000 American action thriller film directed by Stephen Kay; a remake of his 1971 film Get Carter, in which a younger Michael Caine played the title role. Here in the 2000 remake, Caine's role was originally relegated to a one-scene cameo appearance, which he agreed to do as a favor to his friend Sylvester Stallone. However, after a test screening, additional scenes were scripted and shot to expand his role. The film was released in the U.S. on 6 October 2000. Critical reaction was negative, and the film flopped at the box office, with worldwide earnings of approximately only $19 million against a production budget of nearly $64 million. Stallone said: "Believe it or not, I think Get Carter was really underrated. That was a big disappointment. I learned the hard way that [remakes], even if you do it better than the original, there’s a tremendous nostalgia attached to the original. And quite often they’re not done as well." In the 2007 remake of Sleuth, Caine took over the role Laurence Olivier played in the 1972 version and Jude Law played Caine's original role. Caine is one of the few actors to have played a starring role in two versions of the same film. In an interview with CNN, Law spoke of his admiration for Caine: "I learned so much just from watching how he monitored his performance, and also how little he has to do. He's a master technician and sometimes he was doing stuff I didn't see, I couldn't register. I'd go back and watch it on the monitor, it was like 'Oh my God, the amount of variety he's put in there is breathtaking".

Caine also starred in multiple comedies during this time, including playing Austin's father in Austin Powers in Goldmember (2002). In 2003 he co-starred with Robert Duvall, and Haley Joel Osment in the family comedy Secondhand Lions. Caine played family elder Henry Lair in the 2004 film Around the Bend. Also in 2005, he played as Isabel's (Nicole Kidman) father in Bewitched alongside Will Ferrell and Shirley MacLaine. In 2005, he was cast as Bruce Wayne's butler Alfred Pennyworth in Batman Begins, the first film in the new Batman film series known as The Dark Knight Trilogy. In 2006, he appeared in Alfonso Cuaron's acclaimed dystopian drama Children of Men alongside Clive Owen and Julianne Moore as well as Nolan's mystery thriller The Prestige starring Hugh Jackman and Christian Bale. In 2007 he appeared in Flawless, and in 2008 and 2012 he reprised his role as Alfred in Christopher Nolan's critically acclaimed Batman sequels The Dark Knight and The Dark Knight Rises as well as starring in the British drama Is Anybody There?, which explores the final days of life. It was reported by Empire magazine that Caine had said that Harry Brown (released on 13 November 2009) would be his last lead role. Caine later clarified that he had no intention of retiring, stating that "You don't retire in this business; the business retires you."

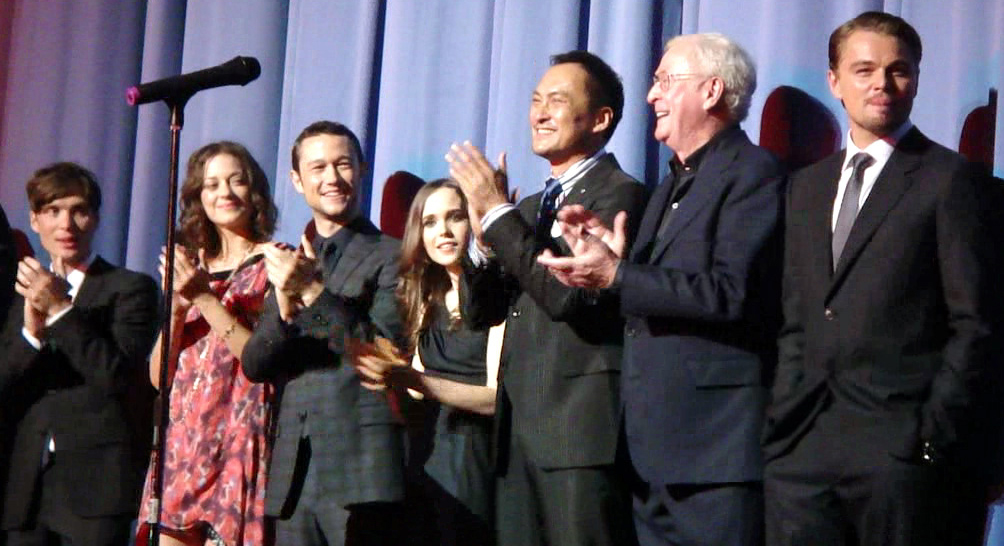
Caine (second from right) with the cast of Inception at 10 July premiere in 2010

Caine appeared in Christopher Nolan's science fiction thriller Inception as Prof. Stephen Miles, Cobb's (Leonardo DiCaprio) mentor and father-in-law. The film was a financial and critical success, earning 8 Academy Award nominations including Best Picture. He voiced Finn McMissile in Pixar's 2011 film Cars 2 and also voiced a supporting role in the animated film Gnomeo & Juliet. He also starred in the 2012 film Journey 2: The Mysterious Island, as Josh Hutcherson's character's grandfather; the film also featured Dwayne Johnson and Vanessa Hudgens. Caine reprised his role as Alfred Pennyworth in the Batman sequel The Dark Knight Rises, which was released in July 2012. Caine later called The Dark Knight Trilogy, "one of the greatest things I have done in my life." In 2013, Caine appeared in the heist thriller Now You See Me starring alongside Jesse Eisenberg, Mark Ruffalo, Isla Fisher, Woody Harrelson, and Morgan Freeman. Caine played the role of Arthur Tressler, an insurance magnate and the Four Horsemen's sponsor. The film, despite receiving mixed reviews from critics, was a financial success at the box office and spawned a sequel, Now You See Me 2 (2016). He appeared in Nolan's 2014 science-fiction film Interstellar as Professor Brand, a high-ranking NASA scientist, ideator of Plan A, former mentor of Cooper and father of Amelia. The film starred Matthew McConaughey, Anne Hathaway, and Jessica Chastain. In 2015, Caine co-starred in Matthew Vaughn's action spy comedy Kingsman: The Secret Service starring Colin Firth, Taron Egerton, and Samuel L. Jackson.

=== 2015–present: Final roles and retirement ===
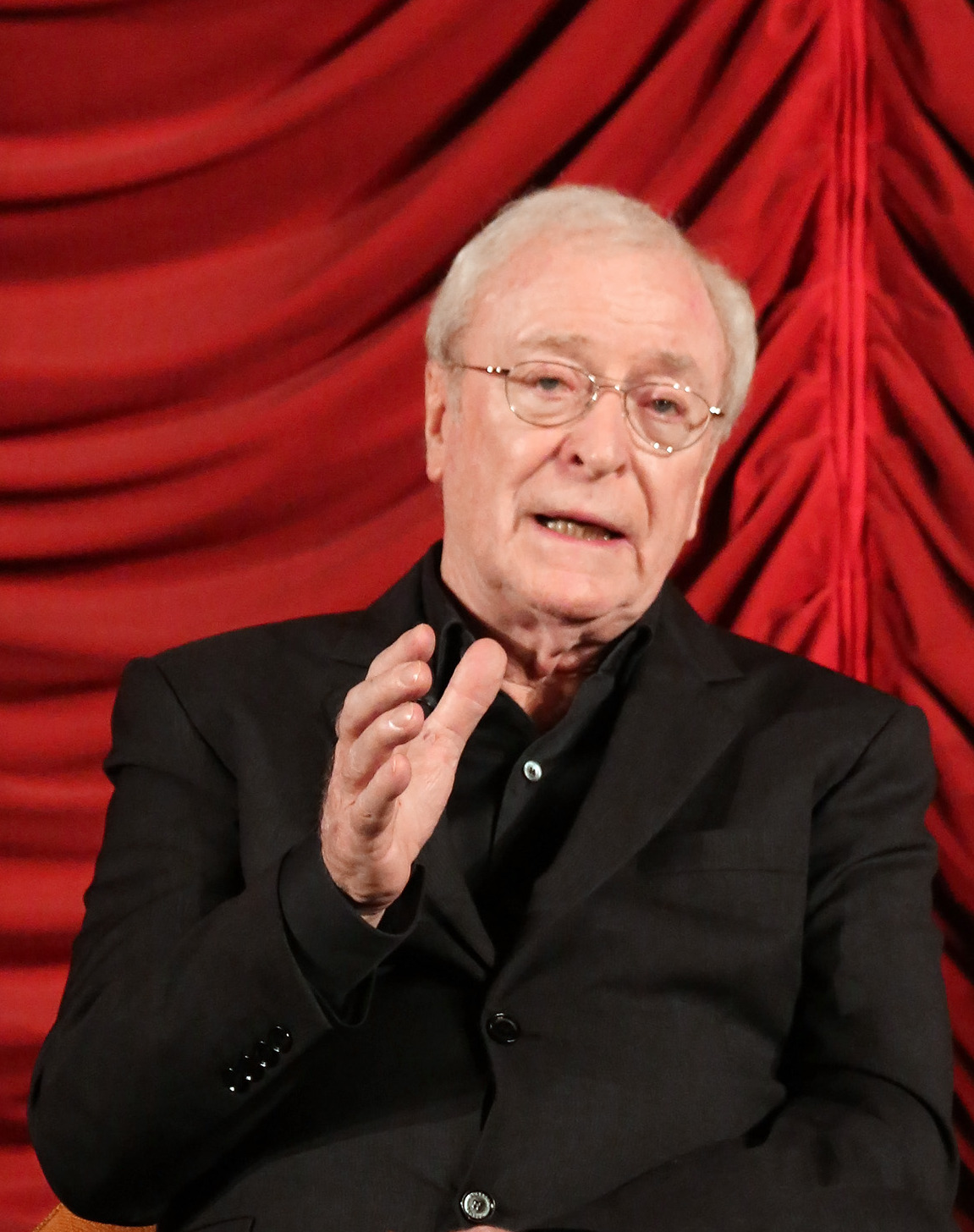
Caine at the 2012 Vienna International Film Festival

In May 2015, Caine starred in Paolo Sorrentino's Italian comedy-drama film Youth alongside Harvey Keitel, Rachel Weisz, Paul Dano, and Jane Fonda. Caine appeared in the lead role of retired composer Fred Ballinger, where he and the film won great acclaim at its debut at the Cannes Film Festival. Caine received a London Film Critics' Circle Award for British Actor of the Year nomination for his performance. In October 2015, Caine read Hans Christian Andersen's "Little Claus and Big Claus" for the children's fairytales app GivingTales in aid of UNICEF, together with Sir Roger Moore, Stephen Fry, Ewan McGregor, Dame Joan Collins, Joanna Lumley, David Walliams, Charlotte Rampling and Paul McKenna.

In 2017, Caine was cast in a spoken cameo role in Christopher Nolan's action-thriller Dunkirk (2017), based on the Dunkirk evacuation of World War II, as a Royal Air Force Spitfire pilot, as a nod to his role of RAF fighter pilot Squadron Leader Canfield in Battle of Britain (1969). In 2018, Caine starred as Brian Reader in King of Thieves, which was based on the Hatton Garden safe deposit burglary of 2015.

In May 2019, Caine was cast as Sir Michael Crosby, a British Intelligence officer, in Christopher Nolan's Tenet (2020). The film starred John David Washington, Robert Pattinson, Elizabeth Debicki and Kenneth Branagh. The film received an American release during the COVID-19 pandemic in September 2020 after being delayed multiple times and became a box office disappointment, despite receiving positive reviews. Caine also appeared in the children's fantasy film, Come Away (2020) starring Angelina Jolie, David Oyelowo, and Gugu Mbatha-Raw. The film premiered at the Sundance Film Festival to mixed reviews, with critics praising its performances and lavish production design. In the 2021 film Twist, an adaptation of Charles Dickens' Oliver Twist set in the present day, Caine plays Fagin. In interviews promoting the 2021 film Best Sellers, Caine suggested that he would not make another film, citing difficulty in walking and his new interest in novel-writing developed during the COVID-19 lockdowns. However, his representatives told Variety that he was not retiring from acting. In 2022, Caine filmed The Great Escaper, a British-French feature film starring Caine and Glenda Jackson, based on the true-life story of a British World War II veteran who 'broke out' of his nursing home to attend the 70th anniversary D-Day commemorations in France, in June 2014. The film was released on 6 October 2023.

Caine officially confirmed his retirement from acting on 13 October 2023, mainly because of the decreasing likelihood of him getting any more leading roles. Caine announced his retirement from acting in a BBC Today radio programme interview with Martha Kearney. Referring to The Great Escaper he said, "I keep saying I'm going to retire, well I am now, because I figured, I've had a picture which is — I played the lead and it's got incredible reviews. The only parts I'm liable to get now are old men, 90-year-old men, and I thought well I might as well leave with all this. I've got wonderful reviews. What am I going to do to beat this?"

== In popular culture ==
"I kept my cockney accent in order to let other working class boys know that if I made it, they could do it too."

— Caine speaking to CNN's The Screening Room in 2007 on retaining his accent.

Caine is regarded as a British cultural icon, with Mairi Mackay of CNN stating: "Michael Caine has been personifying British cool since the Swinging Sixties. He has brought some of British cinema's most iconic characters to life and introduced his very own laid-back cockney gangster into pop culture. He doggedly retained a regional accent at a time when the plummy tones of Received Pronunciation were considered obligatory. It is a sweet irony that his accent has become his calling card." In 2015 The Times called Caine "the epitome of Sixties cool in his first outing as the secret agent Harry Palmer". A trailer for his second role as Palmer described him as possessing "horn rims, cockney wit and an iron fist".

With his distinctive voice and manner of speaking, Caine is a popular subject for impersonators and mimics. Most Caine impressions include the catchphrase "Not a lot of people know that." The catchphrase emanates from Caine's habit of informing people of obscure "interesting facts" that he has collected. Referring to Caine as being the "biggest mine of useless information", Peter Sellers initiated the catchphrase when he appeared on BBC1's Parkinson show on 28 October 1972 and said:

Not many people know that. This is my Michael Caine impression. You see, Mike's always quoting from the Guinness Book of Records. At the drop of a hat he'll trot one out. 'Did you know that it takes a man in a tweed suit five-and-a-half seconds to fall from the top of Big Ben to the ground?' Now there's not many people who know that!

Caine later spoke of how Sellers used his impression of him as his answering machine message in the 1970s: "I called Peter one day, he wasn't in. And there was me saying, 'My name is Michael Caine. I just want you to know that Peter Sellers is not in. Not many people know that.' He invented that 'not many people know that.' And then everybody who rang him, they got me saying, 'Not many people know that.'" Over the years Caine himself had parodied his catchphrase and his "interesting facts", and has imitated others' impressions of him. In an interview with Michael Parkinson in 2007, Caine commented on the impersonations of his voice, "I can do it. 'Hello. My name is Michael Caine. Not many people know that.' I sound like a bloody moron. You know where they've got me now? On birthday cards. 'It's your birthday today. Not many people know that'. Now they've got me on Satellite navigation. It's me going, 'take the second turn on the right, and you'll wind up right in the shit.'" In 1983, Caine used his "not a lot of people know that" phrase as a joke in the film Educating Rita.

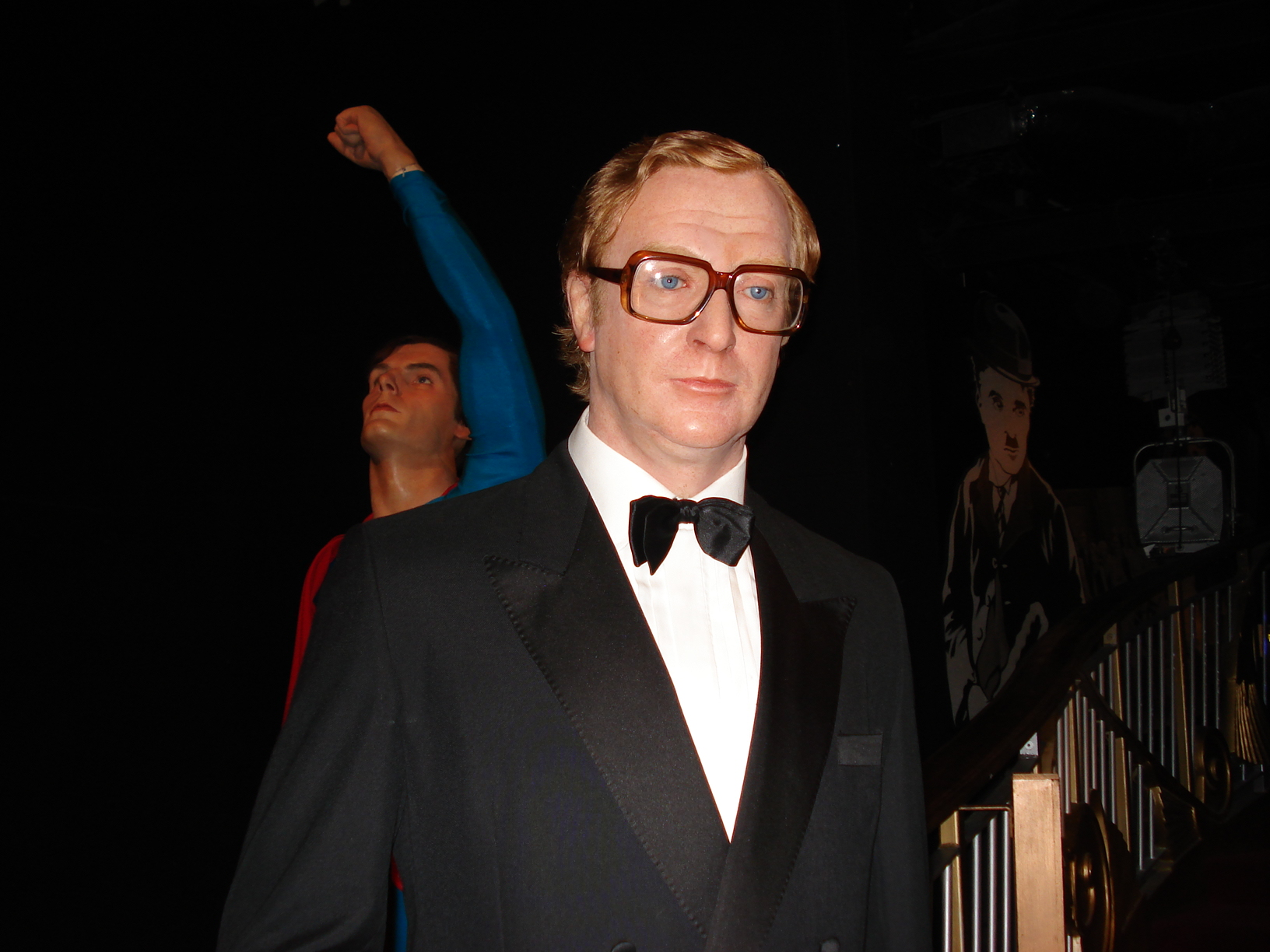
Waxwork of Caine as Harry Palmer (from 1965's The Ipcress File) at Madame Tussauds, London

The comedy sketch show Harry Enfield's Television Programme included a series of sketches in which Paul Whitehouse played a character called Michael Paine, an amalgam of previous Michael Caine impressions, who in a reference to Caine's character Harry Palmer from The Ipcress File wears oversized, thick-rimmed glasses and a trench coat. He introduces himself with the line, "My name is Michael Paine, and I am a nosy neighbour" and in a spoof of the stakeout at the beginning of The Ipcress File, recounts to the camera the "suspiciously" mundane behaviour of his neighbours, before saying, "Not a lot of people know that I know that". Caine's Harry Palmer character (with the glasses, the girls, and disregard for authority) was among the many British pop cultural influences for Mike Myers' Austin Powers films. At Myers' request, Caine himself starred in Austin Powers in Goldmember (2002), with his portrayal of Nigel Powers, father of Austin Powers, spoofing Harry Palmer.

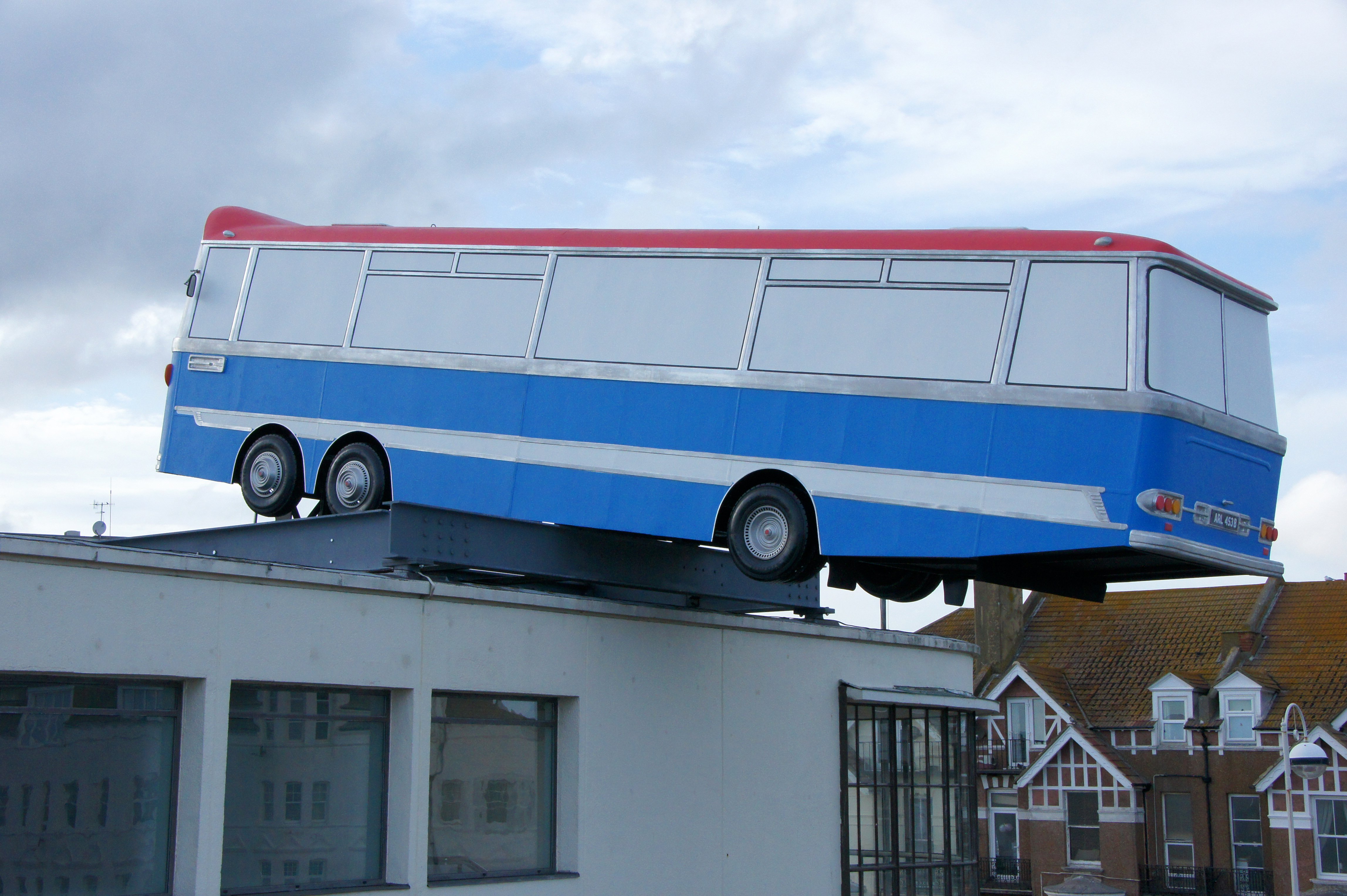
The artwork Hang On a Minute Lads, I've Got a Great Idea, the famous line by Caine at the end of The Italian Job (1969), by Richard Wilson on the De La Warr Pavilion, Bexhill-on-Sea, England

A parody of Caine appears in the animated series Ugly Americans, in the episode "The Dork Knight", which also parodies the film The Dark Knight. In the episode, Caine appears as himself, portrayed in the light of his Alfred Pennyworth interpretation, and constantly annoys the protagonists with endless anecdotes of his career.

The 2010 television series The Trip, starring Rob Brydon and Steve Coogan, featured improvised scenes in which the two leads argue over who can do the better Michael Caine impression. Among the lines they repeat in their attempts to outdo each other are, "You were only supposed to blow the bloody doors off!" and, "She was only sixteen years old"—from The Italian Job and Get Carter, respectively. Coogan and Brydon later did their impressions from a balcony at the Royal Albert Hall during a celebration of Caine's work, only to be interrupted by the real Caine informing them that they were out of shape: "For me, it's a full-time job."

In a 2010 interview with The Telegraph, Caine spoke of the impersonations and how everyone he meets quotes lines at him, to the point he quotes them quoting him. When asked whether he is ever tired of telling his anecdotes, Caine stated: "I enjoy making people laugh. The trick is to tell them against yourself. If you praise yourself your stories aren't funny."

In 2018, Caine starred in a British Airways pre-flight safety video, appearing with six other British celebrities, including actresses Olivia Colman and Naomie Harris. Promoting the Flying Start children's charity partnership between BA and Comic Relief, they are featured 'auditioning' in humorous sketches while also highlighting important safety messages.

== Other pursuits ==
In 1976, Caine became part owner of Langan's Brasserie. At one point, he had ownership in seven restaurants in the UK and US.

Caine has published three volumes of memoirs, What's It All About? in 1992, The Elephant to Hollywood in 2010 and Blowing the Bloody Doors Off: And Other Lessons in Life in 2018. He has also written trivia books, including: Not Many People Know That!, And Not Many People Know This Either!, Michael Caine's Moving Picture Show, and Not a Lot of People Know This Is 1988. Proceeds from the books went to the National Playing Fields Association, a UK charity for which Caine served as vice president, and which aims to protect and promote open spaces for sports and recreation in British cities and towns.

Caine is a fan of chill-out music, and he released a compilation CD, Cained, in 2007 on the UMTV record label. While discussing musical tastes with his friend Elton John, Caine remarked that he had been creating chillout mix tapes as an amateur for years. Caine and Elton John had also appeared on the same episode of Parkinson, during which they sang an impromptu version of the pub tune "Knees Up Mother Brown". Also in music, Caine provided vocal samples for the ska-pop band Madness for their 1984 song "Michael Caine", as his daughter was a fan. He has sung in film roles as well, including Little Voice and for the 1992 musical film The Muppet Christmas Carol.

== Personal life ==
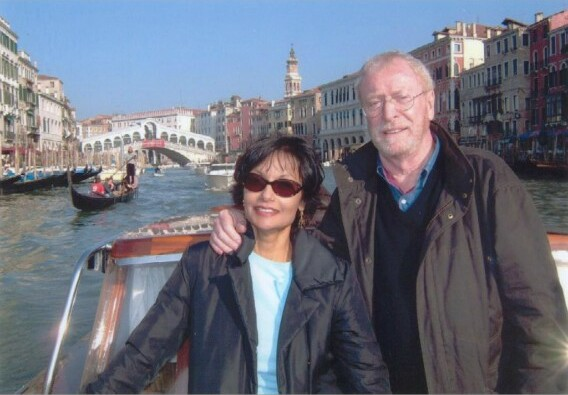
Caine and his wife Shakira in Venice, Italy, in 2014

As of 2023, Caine divides his time between residences in Chelsea Harbour and Wimbledon, London. He previously lived in Leatherhead, Surrey, in a house with a theatre which cost him £100,000 to build. He was patron to the Leatherhead Drama Festival. He has also lived in North Stoke, Oxfordshire; Clewer, Berkshire and Lowestoft, Suffolk. Caine owns a flat at the Apogee in Miami Beach, Florida. He still keeps a small flat near where he grew up in London.

Caine was married to actress Patricia Haines from 1954 to 1958. They had a daughter, Dominique (b. 14 August 1957). He dated Edina Ronay, Nancy Sinatra, Natalie Wood, Candice Bergen, Bianca Jagger, Jill St. John, Élisabeth Ercy and Françoise Pascal. Caine has been married to actress and model Shakira Baksh since 8 January 1973. They met after Caine saw her in a Maxwell House coffee commercial and a friend gave him her telephone number. He called her every day for ten days until she finally agreed to meet him. They have a daughter. Baksh is a Muslim while Caine is a Christian. He reflected in 2009, "My wife is a Muslim and she does Muslim stuff; I'm a Christian and I do Christian stuff, and no questions ever come up. The media view of Muslims is different from mine, which is very benign and peaceful".

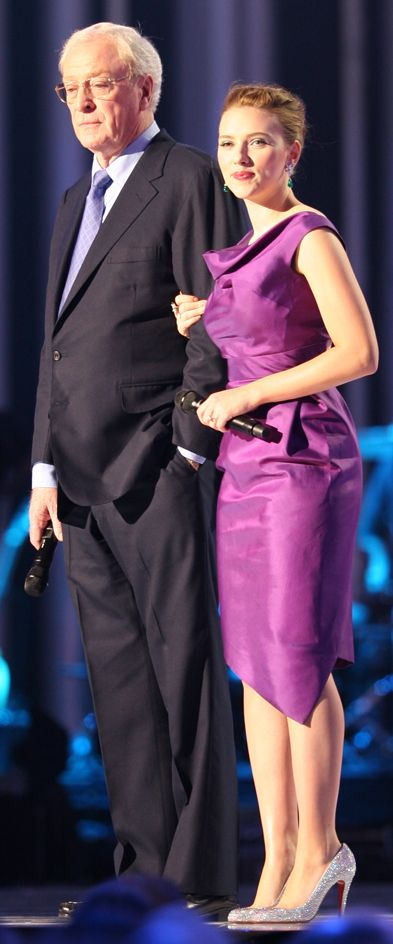
Caine with Scarlett Johansson at the Nobel Peace Prize Concert, December 2008

Proud of his working-class roots, Caine has discussed the opportunities his film career gave him: "I got to play football with Pelé, for God's sake. And I danced with Bob Fosse." He also became close friends with John Lennon, stating: "With John and I it was a case of bonding because we were both working class and we shared a sense of humour. We were pretending we weren't who people thought we were." His closest friends included two James Bond actors, Sean Connery and Roger Moore. At the 61st Academy Awards, the three of them presented the prize for Best Supporting Actor (which Caine and Connery have also won) to Kevin Kline.

In July 2014, Caine was reported to have been a celebrity investor in a tax avoidance scheme called Liberty.

Two years after his mother died, Caine and his younger brother Stanley learned from a news reporter working on a mental health article that they had an elder half-brother, David Burchell. Born six years before Michael's mother met Michael's father, David suffered from severe epilepsy and was a wheelchair user due to a childhood hip injury. He had been in and out of institutions most of his youth before residing permanently in Cane Hill Hospital, a mental health facility, since age 17. Although their mother visited David "nearly every Monday for five decades" at the hospital, even her husband did not know of David's existence. She told Michael that she was sometimes visiting a cousin at the facility. David died in 1992.

Caine quit his 80-cigarettes-a-day smoking habit in the early 1970s after a lecture from actor Tony Curtis. He is a supporter of the football club Chelsea FC. He is also a fan of cricket.

In July 2016, Caine changed his name by deed poll to his long-time stage name to simplify security checks at airports. Caine stated that because the security guard often recognised him but was unaware of his real name, it would waste a considerable amount of his time as he tried to prove that he and "Maurice Joseph Micklewhite" were the same person. "[A security guard] would say, 'Hi Michael Caine,' and suddenly I'd be giving him a passport with a different name on it. I could stand there for an hour. So I changed my name."

In February 2018, Caine suffered a fall on some ice and broke his ankle, which necessitated the use of a walking stick.

In February 2022, Caine underwent back surgery as a result of spinal stenosis, as revealed by his wife, Shakira.

As of 2025, Caine was using a wheelchair for public appearances, including when collecting an award at the Red Sea International Film Festival.

=== Political views ===
Caine has often spoken about his political views, referring to himself as a "left-wing Tory" influenced by both his working class background and Korean War service. He left the UK to live in the United States in the late 1970s due to tax under James Callaghan's Labour government, which peaked at 92 per cent. He lived in Beverly Hills during that time, but returned to the UK eight years later when taxes had been lowered by Margaret Thatcher's Conservative government:

I realised that's not a socialist country, it's a communist country without a dictator, so I left and I was never going to come back. Maggie Thatcher came in and put the taxes back down and in the end, you know, you don't mind paying tax. What am I going to do? Not pay tax and drive around in a Rolls-Royce, with cripples begging on the street like you see in some countries?

Caine said he voted for New Labour under the leadership of Tony Blair in 1997. In 2009, he publicly criticised Gordon Brown's Labour government for its new 50 per cent income tax rate on top earners and threatened to return to the United States if his taxes were increased further. Following the launch of his film Harry Brown in November 2009, Caine called for the reintroduction of national service in the UK to give young people "a sense of belonging, rather than a sense of violence". During the run up to the 2010 general election, Caine publicly endorsed the Conservative Party and appeared with its leader David Cameron for the launch of a civilian non-compulsory "National Service" for sixteen-year-olds.

Caine voted in favour of Brexit in the 2016 European Referendum, stating he would rather be a "poor master than a rich servant". He said he was a reluctant Leaver; "I don't know what to vote for. Both are scary. To me, you've now got in Europe a sort of government-by-proxy of everybody, who has now got carried away. Unless there is some extremely significant changes, we should get out".

In November 2024, following the election of the Labour Party and Keir Starmer becoming Prime Minister in July that year, Caine supported the petition on the UK Parliament petitions website that demanded a new general election in the UK by sharing it on his X account.

In a 2010 Classic FM interview, Caine said that he had requested a doctor to deliberately give his father a fatal overdose when he was dying from liver cancer in 1955 and endorsed voluntary euthanasia. Doctors had told his father that he had only four days to live.

Caine is inspired by Ayn Rand, having named his daughter Dominique after a character in her book The Fountainhead (1943).

== Awards and honours ==
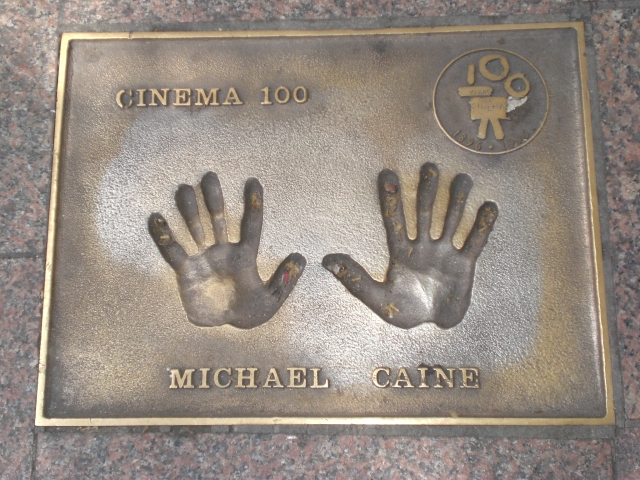
Caine's handprints in Leicester Square, London

Caine has been nominated for an Oscar six times, winning his first Academy Award for the 1986 film Hannah and Her Sisters, and his second in 2000 for The Cider House Rules, in both cases as a supporting actor. His performance in Educating Rita in 1983 earned him the BAFTA and Golden Globe Award for Best Actor. Caine is one of only four actors nominated for an Academy Award for acting in five consecutive decades, and only one of two from the 1960s to 2000s (the other one being Jack Nicholson); Laurence Olivier was also nominated for an acting Oscar in five consecutive decades (from the 1930s through the 1970s) as was Denzel Washington (from the 1980s to the 2020s). Paul Newman received acting Oscar nominations at least once per each of five distinct decades (from the 1950s to the 2000s)—albeit not consecutively, having been overlooked throughout the 1970s.

Caine appeared in seven films that were ranked in the BFI's 100 greatest British films of the 20th century.

Caine was appointed as Commander of the Order of the British Empire (CBE) in the 1992 Birthday Honours, and in the 2000 Birthday Honours he was knighted (as Sir Maurice Micklewhite, CBE) by Queen Elizabeth II at Buckingham Palace for his contribution to cinema. In a tribute to his background, he stated: "I was named after my father and I was knighted in his name because I love my father. I always kept my real name—I'm a very private and family-orientated person." In 2000 he received a BAFTA Academy Fellowship Award.

In 2008, Caine was awarded the prize for Outstanding Contribution to Showbusiness at the Variety Club Awards. On 5 January 2011 he was honored as Commander of the Ordre des Arts et des Lettres by France's culture minister, Frédéric Mitterrand. In May 2012, Caine was awarded the Honorary Freedom of the London Borough of Southwark as a person of distinction and eminence of the borough. In 2017, Caine was the recipient of the Golden Plate Award of the American Academy of Achievement. His Golden Plate was presented by Awards Council member Peter Jackson.

== Published works ==
Caine has written four memoirs, he published the first, What's It All About?, in 1992. Its title is a quote from the title song from his 1966 hit film Alfie. The book was reviewed negatively in The New York Times, which called it an "archetypal show-business memoir" that was engaging but tainted by the book's "name-dropping, the sexual boasting, the sensitivity to slights". His second memoir, The Elephant to Hollywood, was published in 2010. Its title refers to his journey from working-class roots in the Elephant and Castle neighborhood of London to Hollywood success. Janet Maslin of The New York Times reviewed it positively, calling Caine a "charming raconteur" and "wittily self-deprecating". His third memoir, Blowing the Bloody Doors Off, was published in 2018. Its title is a quote from his 1969 hit film The Italian Job. His fourth memoir, Don't Look Back, You'll Trip Over: My Guide to Life, was published in 2024.

Caine's first novel, a thriller entitled Deadly Game, was published in November 2023.

=== Fiction ===
- Deadly Game. Hachette. 2023. ISBN 978-1399702508.

=== Memoirs ===
- What's It All About? An Autobiography. Random House. 1992. ISBN 978-0394584218.
- My Autobiography: The Elephant to Hollywood. London: Macmillan Publishers Ltd. 2011.
- Blowing the Bloody Doors Off: And Other Lessons in Life. Hachette. 2018. ISBN 978-0316451192.
- Don't Look Back, You'll Trip Over: My Guide to Life. Hodder & Stoughton. 2024. ISBN 978-1399739979.

=== Other non-fiction ===
- Not Many People Know That!: Michael Caine's Almanac of Amazing Information. Hodder & Stoughton. 1984. ISBN 978-0340379059.
- And Not Many People Know This Either!. Robson Books. 1985. ISBN 978-0860513452.
- Acting in Film: An Actor's Take on Moviemaking. Applause Theatre Book Publishers. 1990. ISBN 9781557832771.

== Explanatory notes ==
Preceded by Michael Gough	Alfred Pennyworth Actor; 2005, 2008, 2012	Succeeded by Sean Pertwee
