= Len Deighton bibliography =

Len Deighton (1929–2026) was an English author known for his novels, works of military history, screenplays and cookery writing. He had a varied career, including as a pastry cook, waiter, co-editor of a magazine, teacher and air steward before writing his first novel in 1962: The IPCRESS File. He continued to produce what his biographer John Reilly considers "stylish, witty, well-crafted novels" in spy fiction, including three trilogies and a prequel featuring Bernard Samson. (Note: The ten books are: Berlin Game (1983); Mexico Set (1984); London Match (1985); Spy Hook (1988); Spy Line (1989); Spy Sinker (1990); Faith (1994); Hope (1995); Charity (1996); The prequel, published in 1987, is Winter.)

Deighton authored two television scripts, the first of which was Long Past Glory in 1963; he also wrote a film script, Oh! What a Lovely War (1969). His long-held interest in cooking—his mother had been a professional chef and instilled a love for cuisine in her son—led to an illustrated cookery column in the Sunday newspaper, The Observer, for two years. The work was collected into two later books, Len Deighton's Action Cook Book and Où est le garlic (both 1965); he subsequently wrote several other cookery books. Deighton has produced several other works of non-fiction, including a study of the assassination of John F. Kennedy, a history of the airship, Second World War military history and a short e-book about James Bond.

== Novels ==
The novels of Len Deighton
Title	Year of first publication	First edition publisher (All London)
The IPCRESS File	1962	Hodder & Stoughton
Horse Under Water	1963	Jonathan Cape
Funeral in Berlin	1964	Jonathan Cape
Billion-Dollar Brain	1966	Jonathan Cape
An Expensive Place to Die (Note: First edition came with a wallet of fictional secret documents)	1967	Jonathan Cape
Only When I Larf	1967	Privately printed (Note: Private printed edition of 150 copies is the first true edition; the public edition came in 1968, published through Michael Joseph. Deighton was also a co-producer of the film version of the novel.)
Bomber	1970	Jonathan Cape
Close-Up	1972	Jonathan Cape
Spy Story	1974	Jonathan Cape
Yesterday's Spy	1975	Jonathan Cape
Twinkle, Twinkle, Little Spy	1976	Jonathan Cape
SS-GB	1978	Jonathan Cape
XPD	1981	Hutchinson
Goodbye, Mickey Mouse	1982	Hutchinson
Berlin Game	1983	Hutchinson
Mexico Set	1984	Hutchinson
London Match	1985	Hutchinson
Winter	1987	Hutchinson
Spy Hook	1988	Hutchinson
Spy Line	1989	Hutchinson
Spy Sinker	1990	Hutchinson
MAMista	1991	Random House
City of Gold	1991	Random House
Violent Ward	1993	HarperCollins
Faith	1994	HarperCollins
Hope	1995	HarperCollins
Charity	1996	HarperCollins

== Miscellaneous ==
Several of Deighton's works have been adapted for screen: the films The Ipcress File (1965), Funeral in Berlin (1966), Billion Dollar Brain (1967) and Spy Story (1976). In 1988 Granada Television produced the miniseries Game, Set and Match based on his trilogy of the same name.

Miscellaneous works of Len Deighton
Title	Year of first publication	First edition publisher (London, unless otherwise stated)	Notes
Long Past Glory	1963	–	Television script
Len Deighton's Cookstrips	1963–1965	The Observer	Weekly cookery strip
Drinkmanship	1964	Haymarket Press	As editor
Oh! What a Lovely War	1969	–	Film script; Deighton requested that he not be given screen credit for his work.
Declarations of War	1971	Jonathan Cape	Short stories
How to be a Pregnant Father	1977	Macmillan Publishers	Book by Peter Mayle; Deighton provided the chapter "The Pregnant Father's Cookbook"
It Must Have Been Two Other Fellows	1977	–	Television script
Tactical Genius in Battle	1979	Phaidon Press	Book by Simon Goodenough; Deighton acted as editor and provided the introduction
The Adventure of the Priory School	1985	Santa Teresa Press, Santa Barbara, CA	Introduction only; original work by Arthur Conan Doyle. This edition was published for copyright purposes; limited to 25 copies
Pests	1994	Chris Martin, Mansfield Woodhouse, Notts	A limited edition of 226 copies
Sherlock Holmes and the Titanic Swindle	2006	Crippen & Landru, Norfolk, VA	A short story included in The Detection Club anthology The Verdict of Us All, edited by Peter Lovesey

== Non-fiction ==
Non-fiction works of Len Deighton
Title	Year of first publication	First edition publisher (London, unless otherwise stated)	Notes
Len Deighton's Action Cook Book	1965	Jonathan Cape	
Où est le garlic	1965	Penguin Books	
The Assassination of President Kennedy	1967	Jonathan Cape	Co-written with M Rand and H Lockston
Len Deighton's London Dossier	1967	Jonathan Cape	
Continental Dossier	1968	Michael Joseph	
Fighter: The True Story of the Battle of Britain	1977	Jonathan Cape	
Airshipwreck	1978	Jonathan Cape	with Arnold Schwartzman
Blitzkrieg: From the Rise of Hitler to the Fall of Dunkirk	1979	Jonathan Cape	
Basic French Cooking	1979	Jonathan Cape	
Battle of Britain	1980	Jonathan Cape	
The Orient Flight	1980	Germany Philatelic Society, Chesterfield, MO	As "Cyril Deighton"; with Fred Blau
The Egypt Flight	1981	Germany Philatelic Society, Chesterfield, MO	As "Cyril Deighton"; with Fred Blau
ABC of French Food	1989	Century	
Basic French Cookery Course	1990	Century	
Blood, Tears and Folly	1993	Jonathan Cape	
British Military Greats	2004	Cassell	contributed "Battle of Britain" chapter
James Bond: My Long and Eventful Search for His Father	2012	Amazon Kindle	In e-book format only

== Notes and references ==
=== Sources ===
- Brown, Geoffrey (February 1987). "The Thrillers and Spy Novels of Len Deighton". The Book and Magazine Collector (35). Diamond Publishing Group.
- Burton, Alan (2016). Historical Dictionary of British Spy Fiction. London: Rowman & Littlefield. ISBN 978-1-4422-5587-6.
- Jackson, Crispin; Gwilliam, Graham (March 1999). "Len Deighton: The Master Thriller Writer Turns Seventy". The Book and Magazine Collector (180). Diamond Publishing Group.
- Milward-Oliver, Edward (1987). The Len Deighton Companion. London: Grafton. ISBN 978-0-586-07000-0.
- Reilly, John M (1980). Twentieth Century Crime & Mystery Writers. London: Macmillan. ISBN 978-1-349-81366-7.
