= Quentin Tarantino's unrealized projects =

During his career, American film director Quentin Tarantino has worked on a number of projects which never progressed beyond the pre-production stage under his direction. Some of these projects fell into "development hell" or were officially canceled, some were turned over to other production teams, and others never made it past the speculative stage.

== 1980s ==
=== Love Birds in Bondage ===
Tarantino co-wrote Love Birds in Bondage with Scott Magill or McGill. Tarantino would go on to co-produce and co-direct the film. McGill committed suicide in 1987, but not before destroying all footage that had been shot. The film concerned a young woman who suffered a traumatic brain injury after an accident leading her to act erratically. She is institutionalized in a mental hospital and her boyfriend figures out a way to get himself admitted. Tarantino also played the boyfriend.

=== My Best Friend's Birthday ===
Long before his first released feature Reservoir Dogs, Tarantino met with Craig Hamann and was introduced to his 30-40 page script, My Best Friend's Birthday. Tarantino helped expand the script up to 80 pages and agreed to direct the film. On a $5,000 budget and a 16 mm camera, the film was shot in the span of four years. It was often alleged that the completed run time came out to 70 minutes but due to a lab fire during editing, the film was nearly destroyed, and only 36 minutes remained. However, in the 2019 book My Best Friend's Birthday: The Making of a Quentin Tarantino Film, written by Andrew J. Rausch, it was revealed the fire story was fabricated, with Tarantino choosing not to dismiss it as he thought it sounded interesting. In actuality, some rolls of film were simply discarded by mistake, and Tarantino, unsatisfied with the final product, edited together the scenes he liked, leaving the project unfinished. The 36 minute version was roughly edited together, and screened at several film festivals.

=== The Open Road ===
Tarantino co-worker and collaborator Roger Avary wrote a 40–80 page script while working with Tarantino at Video Archives. Avary likened it to Martin Scorsese's After Hours. The story revolved around a buttoned-up business man who decides to leave his world for the open road. He ends up picking up a wild hitchhiker and they get into various adventures. However, Avary struggled to finish the story and at some point Tarantino started to work on it and make changes. According to Tarantino the title of the screenplay was Pandemonium Reigns. According to Avary, Pandemonium Reigns was a separate script about a boxer who does not throw a fight, and the origins of Butch Coolidge.

At some point the script was named The Open Road and Tarantino ended up turning it into a 500-page screenplay with Avary. A significant change came when Tarantino changed the business man and hitchhiker into a comic book store worker and a call girl named Clarence and Alabama. Clarence begins to write a movie script while the two of them are on the road about a psychotic fantasy version of him and Alabama. The couple are serial killers named Mickey and Mallory. Eventually story and plot from Clarence's script start to bleed into his and Alabama's life, blurring the lines of fantasy and reality.

In spite of being 500 pages long, neither Tarantino nor Avary could figure out how to end the story. They deconstructed the whole thing leading to the screenplays of True Romance and Natural Born Killers, as well as aspects of Killing Zoe and Pulp Fiction.

== 1990s ==
=== Untitled John Woo film ===
In 1992, during a Toronto International Film Festival press conference for Reservoir Dogs, Tarantino revealed he wrote a screenplay for a film directed by John Woo. The film went unproduced.

=== Silver Surfer ===
Fresh off of the success of Reservoir Dogs, Tarantino went to Constantin Films with a completed script for a proposed Silver Surfer film. Ultimately, Constantin Films passed on his script.

=== Luke Cage ===
After the release of Reservoir Dogs, Tarantino contemplated developing a film based on Luke Cage. Being a huge fan of the character, Tarantino held a meeting with producer Ed Pressman, who owned the film rights to Luke Cage, and proposed a film based on the character and suggested casting Laurence Fishburne as Cage. Despite liking the idea, Tarantino shifted his interest for Pulp Fiction.

=== The Psychic remake ===
Sometime in the 1990s, Tarantino considered remaking Lucio Fulci's 1977 giallo Sette note in nero (Seven Notes in Black), released in America as The Psychic. He intended for Jackie Brown co-star Bridget Fonda to star in the film. By the year 2000, Tarantino gave an update on the proposed remake: "It's a project in the murky future. I don't even own the rights to that stuff. It's one of those things where it's like if somebody buys the rights to make it, I won't make it. They can totally fuck it up. If it's meant to happen, it'll happen." No further remarks on the project were made until Dardano Sacchetti, one of the original film's writers, revealed in an interview conducted for its 2019 Blu-ray release that he had been in contact with producers from Sony Pictures, who were interested in having Tarantino or other directors remake the film.

=== Black Mask ===
In the early 1990s, Tarantino has stated that he originally planned "to do a Black Mask movie", referring to the magazine largely responsible for popularizing hardboiled detective fiction, but development on "it kind of went somewhere else".

=== Killshot ===
After completing Pulp Fiction, Tarantino and Roger Avary acquired the film rights to Elmore Leonard's novel Killshot. Tarantino initially planned to write and direct Killshot and have another director make Rum Punch, but he changed his mind after re-reading the latter, saying he "fell in love" with the novel all over again.

=== Halloween 6 ===
In 1994, after completing Pulp Fiction, Miramax approached Tarantino to write and direct a sixth installment of the Halloween franchise. Though a screenplay was never completed, Tarantino pitched a story idea involving Michael Myers and the Man in Black fleeing Haddonfield together and going on a road trip down Route 66 while murdering people, events which bear resemblance to those depicted in his screenplay for Natural Born Killers, which he was pitching to Miramax Films at the same time. Tarantino ultimately declined the offer, but suggested Evil Dead II co-writer Scott Spiegel as a potential director.

=== The Killer Inside Me ===
In the mid-1990s, after the success of Pulp Fiction, Tarantino was attached to direct an adaption of The Killer Inside Me. Uma Thurman was set to star as Amy Stanton. Juliette Lewis was considered for the part of Joyce Lakeland and Brad Pitt was attached to star as Lou Ford. This effort fell through after the September 11 attacks, because the film script was deemed too violent. The film was eventually directed by Michael Winterbottom in 2010, without the involvement of Tarantino.

=== The Man from U.N.C.L.E. ===
Tarantino was briefly attached to a film adaptation of the 1960s TV series The Man from U.N.C.L.E.. He opted to do Jackie Brown instead. Eventually, a film adaptation of the show without Tarantino's involvement was released in 2015.

=== Never Again ===
In 1996, Tarantino was set to direct The X-Files episode "Never Again", but he was prevented by the Directors Guild of America; the guild noted that Tarantino, who was not a member, failed to join the union after directing the ER episode "Motherhood", violating an agreement the two parties had made. A spokeswoman from 20th Century Fox later noted, "Quentin approached us, we were very excited at the opportunity. We made some special arrangements, and we're disappointed that it's not happening. But we bow to Quentin's philosophical stance [and] we hope something can be worked out for the future." The episode was eventually directed by Rob Bowman and released in 1997.

=== Modesty Blaise ===
In 1997, it was reported that Tarantino would write the screenplay for a Modesty Blaise film for Miramax, and planned as a franchise. An anticipated sequel, pending the first film's success, was to be written by Neil Gaiman. In 2004, he would later serve as an executive producer on My Name Is Modesty, an adaptation of the Modesty Blaise comic series.

=== Sometimes We Touch ===
In 1997, Variety reported that Tarantino optioned J.C. Pollock's then-upcoming book Sometimes We Touch.

=== Green Lantern ===
In the late 1990s, Tarantino was offered to direct a film adaptation of Green Lantern before there was even a script, but he declined the offer.

=== The Outfit ===
Also in the late 1990s, Tarantino considered doing his version of Donald E. Westlake's The Outfit—previously filmed in 1973—with Robert De Niro as Parker, Harvey Keitel as his partner, and Pam Grier as the female lead. Specifically, the project was mooted during Tarantino's six-year hiatus from directing after the release of Jackie Brown and before committing to Kill Bill. Decides later, he expressed his regret that the opportunity had passed; "There's a part of me that wishes, now that they're older and can't do it, there's a part of me that really wishes I could have done that."

=== Iron Man ===
In 1999, Tarantino was also linked to a live-action Iron Man film, as director and writer.

=== Double V Vega ===
When developing Inglourious Basterds, Tarantino began to consider making a prequel/origin story about the Vega brothers. The film would have starred Michael Madsen as Vic Vega (Mr. Blonde) from Reservoir Dogs and John Travolta as Vincent Vega from Pulp Fiction. In 2007, due to the actors' ages and because of their characters' deaths in their respective films, Tarantino claimed that the film, titled Double V Vega, was "kinda unlikely now."

== 2000s ==
=== Forty Lashes Less One ===
In 2000, Tarantino was rumored to be developing the Elmore Leonard novel, Forty Lashes Less One, into a film. By 2007, he had written 20 pages of the screenplay. In 2015, he revealed that he still owned the rights to adapt the book, and that he was considering adapting it into a television miniseries.

=== Kill Bill sequels and spin-offs ===
During the production of Kill Bill and Kill Bill: Vol. 2, Tarantino originally believed that he would do a further two live action Kill Bill films, tentatively believing that they would be made once every ten years. In April 2004, Tarantino told Entertainment Weekly that he was planning a sequel:

"Oh yeah, initially I was thinking this would be my Dollars Trilogy. I was going to do a new one every ten years. But I need at least fifteen years before I do this again. I've already got the whole mythology: Sofie Fatale will get all of Bill's money. She'll raise Nikki, who'll take on The Bride. Nikki deserves her revenge every bit as much as The Bride deserved hers. I might even shoot a couple of scenes for it now so I can get the actresses while they're this age."

Details emerged around 2007 about two possible sequels. According to the article, "the third film involves the revenge of two killers whose arms and eye were hacked by Uma Thurman in the first stories." The article adds that the "fourth installment of the popular kung fu action films concerns a cycle of reprisals and daughters who avenge their mother's deaths". At the 2009 Morelia International Film Festival, Tarantino stated that he intended to make a third Kill Bill film. The same month, he stated that Kill Bill 3 would be his ninth film, and would be released in 2014. He stated that he wanted 10 years to pass after the Bride's last conflict, to give her and her daughter a period of peace. In December 2012, Tarantino stated: "I don't know if there's ever going to be a Kill Bill: Vol. 3. We'll see, probably not though." In January 2016, it was reported that Tarantino had spoken with Thurman on a potential return for a sequel, but noted that he remained non-committal on actually making a sequel. In July 2019, Tarantino stated: "Me and Uma have talked about it recently, frankly, to tell you the truth, I have thought about it a little further. We were talking about it literally last week. If any of my movies were going to spring from my other movies, it would be a third 'Kill Bill.'" In December, Tarantino said he had spoken to Thurman about an "interesting" idea for a new film: "It would be at least three years from now. It is definitely in the cards", while Uma Thurman confirmed that "Tarantino wrote something". In June 2021, Tarantino stated that the film would take place 20 years following the original films, when Beatrix Kiddo and her daughter B.B. are forced to go on the run after a period of peace. He found the idea of casting Thurman and her daughter Maya Hawke in the two roles exciting, after having previously worked with Hawke on Once Upon a Time in Hollywood. He also noted the possibility of Elle Driver, Sophie Fatale, and Gogo's twin sister Shiaki also appearing in the film.

He also envisioned making separate animated films which would tell the origin stories of both the Bride, when she was with the Deadly Viper Assassination Squad, and of Bill and his three Godfathers: Hatori Hanso, Pei Mei, and Esteban Vihaio. Tarantino had intended to make them following Grindhouse.

By 2021, however, Tarantino stated that none of the projects came to fruition due to his reluctance to take on more Kill Bill films following the fatigue he endured in the making of the first two.

=== Inglourious Basterds TV miniseries ===
After the completion of Kill Bill, Tarantino was originally developing Inglourious Basterds as a mini-series, before Luc Besson convinced him to make it as a film.

=== Untitled kung-fu film ===
Following the success of his Kill Bill films, Tarantino began developing a kung-fu followup film that would be entirely in Mandarin. It was to be made before Inglourious Basterds. The inspiration to do another martial arts film came from Tarantino seeing Zhang Yimou's House of Flying Daggers at the 2004 Cannes Film Festival. It wasn't known if Tarantino would hire actors fluent in Mandarin or celebrities that would have to learn Mandarin. The plan on releasing was to have two theatrical cuts, one with subtitles and the other with an out-of-sync English language dubbing, similar to old-school re dubs. Since then, no updates have emerged from the ambitious project.

=== Casino Royale ===
In the mid-2000s, Tarantino expressed interest in directing Casino Royale, the 2006 film adaptation of Ian Fleming's debut novel and the debut of James Bond. However, Eon Productions had no interest in hiring Tarantino. He claims to have worked behind the scenes with the Fleming family, and believed this was the reason why filmmakers finally went ahead with Casino Royale. Tarantino also said he would have set it in the 1960s and would have only made it with Pierce Brosnan returning as Bond. By February 2005, Martin Campbell was announced as the film's director, and the film was released on November 14, 2006, to critical and box-office success.

=== Untitled disaster film ===
Tarantino wanted to take his hand at another popular '70s genre film, where Jackie Brown was with blaxploitation and Kill Bill was with kung-fu films, this time with a disaster film. Taking inspiration from films like The Towering Inferno, The Poseidon Adventure, and Airport, Tarantino wanted to get as many of his reoccurring actors as possible and jokingly dubbed this Airport 2005. He remarked his casting choice as so: "Travolta could be the pilot, Pam Grier the stewardess, Robert Forster, Michael Madsen, Tim Roth, Harvey Keitel, Bridget Fonda."

=== The Scarlet Pimpernel ===
Also in the mid-2000s, Tarantino expressed interest in directing an adaptation of the British swashbuckler novel The Scarlet Pimpernel, with Sacha Baron Cohen starring. 20 years later, Tarantino and Cohen would reunite for a different British swashbuckler project, with the play The Popinjay Cavalier (2027).

=== Grindhouse sequel ===
Both Tarantino and Robert Rodriguez have expressed interest in making a sequel to their 2007 double-feature film Grindhouse. Tarantino said that he wants to shoot an "old-school Kung Fu movie in Mandarin with subtitles in some countries, and release a shorter, dubbed cut in others" for his segment. It has also been reported by Rotten Tomatoes that Edgar Wright may expand Don't into a feature film. According to Eli Roth, he and Wright have discussed the possibility of pairing Don't with Thanksgiving for a Grindhouse sequel. Roth is quoted as saying "We're talking to Dimension about it. I think they're still trying to figure out Grindhouse 1 before we think about Grindhouse 2, but I've already been working on the outline for it and I would do it in a heartbeat."

=== Westworld remake ===
In 2007, after the modest success of Death Proof, Warner Bros. hired Tarantino to direct a remake of the 1973 science-fiction film Westworld. Arnold Schwarzenegger was involved in the project as the lone gunslinger. However, Tarantino was fired due to creative differences with Warner Bros., specifically on the fact he wanted it to have a dark tone and was unsatisfied with Schwarzenegger. Eventually, the project was scrapped.

=== Sgt. Rock ===
Following the release of Death Proof, Warner Bros. also offered Tarantino a film adaptation of the DC Comics character Sgt. Rock, with a script written by David Webb Peoples. In June 2021, Tarantino called Webb's script magnificent, and believed he "would do a good job" if he directed it. He also noted that he doubted he would make the film, but still considered it "from time to time".

=== Faster, Pussycat! Kill! Kill! remake ===
Tarantino expressed in January 2008 his interest in a raunchy remake of the 1966 sexploitation film Faster, Pussycat! Kill! Kill!. The film has quite an influence on Tarantino; even going as far as to referencing the movie and giving co-writer/director of Faster, Pussycat!, Russ Meyer, thanks in his 2007 film Death Proof. Allegedly, the top casting choices would have been Kim Kardashian, Eva Mendes, and Britney Spears, with porn star Tera Patrick as Varla. When the rumor of Britney Spears playing Varla was brought to his attention, a source close to Tarantino replied that, "There is no truth to this." Actress Tura Satana clarified in an interview that she is working closely with Tarantino in rewriting the script. Since then, no other updates have emerged from his remake.

=== Berlin Game, Mexico Set and London Match ===
When promoting Inglourious Basterds, Tarantino stated that he wanted to adapt the first trilogy of novels by Len Deighton about fictional spy Bernard Samson; Berlin Game, Mexico Set and London Match. "I love England," Tarantino said. "It would be a wonderful life experience to have an excuse to work [there] for six or nine months." Tarantino also mused about working with British actors Simon Pegg, Kate Winslet, Michael Caine and Anthony Hopkins on projects.

=== Untitled 1930s-set gangster series ===
Tarantino first teased at the Morelia International Film Festival in Mexico back in 2009 about possibly doing a crime film in the style of those produced at Warner Bros. during the 1930s. At the 2013 BAFTA Awards, he was quoting as saying, "I could conceive maybe someday doing a '30s gangster picture, or something like that." In 2026, TMZ reported that Sylvester Stallone was teaming up with Tarantino to co-direct a 6-part series featuring gangsters, showgirls, boxing, and music. It was to be shot in black and white using '30s camera equipment.

=== Untitled screwball comedy ===
Tarantino had expressed interest in making a screwball romantic comedy film in the vein of Howard Hawks films that would've starred two A-list leads. No other news updates have emerged since.

=== Untitled John Brown biopic ===
Despite later mentions of his general distaste for the "biopic" genre, in an August 2009 interview with Charlie Rose, Tarantino said,

"There is one story that I could be interested in, but it would probably be one of the last movies I [ever make] ... My favorite hero in American history is John Brown. He's my favorite American who ever lived. He basically single-handedly started the road to end slavery and ... he killed people to do it. He decided, 'If we start spilling white blood, then they're going to start getting the idea.'"

=== Yucatan ===
In September 2009, Clifton Collins Jr. told The Film Stage that Chad McQueen and Lance Sloan were involving Tarantino in former Steve McQueen dream project Yucatan, and that he would be the best choice for director. McG was also involved with the project at one point.

== 2010s ==
=== Untitled medieval film ===
In January 2010, Tarantino announced that his next film, after Inglourious Basterds, will be a medieval film. He offered a role to Helen Mirren as a foul-mouthed monarch. The film was to retain Tarantino's signature traits, bloody violence and foul language, and was to be set in England's Middle Ages. Mirren had previously played a queen in 2006's The Queen as Queen Elizabeth II and was willing to play a monarch yet again. Although she was interested in the role, no other updates have emerged from this project, and his follow-up film to Inglourious was Django Unchained.

=== Less than Zero remake ===
In May 2010, Bret Easton Ellis, author of the 1985 novel Less than Zero, confirmed in an interview that Tarantino had been "trying to get Fox to let him remake the 1987 film". In 2012, when asked whether Less than Zero would be remade, Ellis once again confirmed that Tarantino "has shown interest" in adapting the story.

=== Untitled family film ===
In 2011, Tarantino briefly mentioned that he would like to do a children's film. He recalls in an interview on the Reelz Channel:

"I've actually always wanted to come up with a story that I wanted to do as a kid's movie... I remember from working at Video Archives that if a kid likes a movie, like say Mighty Ducks, they see that movie 20 times, 30 times. They know the names of all the kids in The Mighty Ducks and it's like, that's an audience member I want on my side! I just have to come up with the right storyline."

=== Killer Crow ===
In a late 2012 interview with the online magazine The Root, Tarantino described his next film as being the final entry in a "Django–Inglourious Basterds" trilogy called Killer Crow. The film will depict a group of World War II-era black troops who have "been fucked over by the American military and kind of go apeshit. They basically – the way Lt. Aldo Raine (Brad Pitt) and the Basterds are having an 'Apache resistance' – [the] black troops go on an Apache warpath and kill a bunch of white soldiers and white officers on a military base and are just making a warpath to Switzerland." Since then, no updates have emerged.

=== Django in White Hell ===
In November 2013, Tarantino announced plans to direct another western film, following Django Unchained. The project began development as a sequel novel to Django Unchained, and then a sequel film, before Django was removed from the script and the project was rewritten as his 2015 film The Hateful Eight.

=== Untitled prison film ===
Around the time he almost shelved The Hateful Eight because of a script leak, he talked about doing a prison film inspired by the Robert Blake murder case. He was potentially penning a script for a prison movie but no other updates have emerged from this project since then. In 2021, Tarantino's novel Once Upon a Time in Hollywood, based on his film of the same name, was dedicated to Blake. Notably, Blake's later life dealing with his wife's murder mirrors Brad Pitt's character Cliff Booth who is also accused of murdering his wife.

=== Untitled sci-fi film ===
At San Diego Comic-Con in 2014, Tarantino revealed he was contemplating a possible science fiction film, saying "It might be science fiction, but it wouldn't involve spaceships."

=== Django/Zorro ===
In 2015, a Django Unchained sequel crossover comic entitled Django/Zorro was released by Dynamite Entertainment. In June 2019, Tarantino had picked Jerrod Carmichael to co-write a film adaptation based on the crossover comic book series. In December 2019, it was reported that Tarantino was looking to make a smaller, stand-alone film, leaving development on Django/Zorro in doubt. In a 2022 interview with GQ, Carmichael revealed that the film had been canceled. In April 2026, the film reentered development with Brian Helgeland writing the screenplay, but without Tarantino's involvement as writer or director.

=== Untitled Star Trek film ===
While making a guest appearance on The Nerdist Podcast in December 2015, Tarantino expressed interest in making a Star Trek film. He said he was a fan of Star Trek: The Original Series (1966–1969) and J. J. Abrams's Star Trek (2009), and felt many classic Star Trek episodes could easily be expanded into a feature film. By December 2017, Tarantino pitched an idea to Paramount Pictures for a new Star Trek film. A writers room, consisting of Mark L. Smith, Lindsey Beer, Megan Amram and Drew Pearce, was assembled to flesh out the concept. The plan would be for Tarantino to direct the film, with Abrams, who had previously directed and produced earlier Star Trek reboot projects, on board to produce. Smith later became the frontrunner to write the screenplay later that month.

In May 2019, Tarantino confirmed that his Trek film was still in development, saying "It's a very big possibility. I haven't been dealing with those guys for a while cause I've been making my movie. But we've talked about a story and a script. The script has been written and when I emerge my head like Punxsutawney Phil, post-Once Upon a Time in Hollywood, we'll pick up talking about it again." Tarantino discussed the project in June 2019, stating that Smith had turned in his script, and Tarantino would soon be adding in his notes. He asserted his intention for the film to be rated R. In December 2019, it was reported that Tarantino had left the project, looking to make a smaller budget film. In January 2020, Tarantino stated the film "might" be made, but he would not direct it.

In August 2020, then-new Paramount Pictures president Emma Watts considered producing a Star Trek film using Smith's screenplay, but with a different director. In August 2021, Smith stated that the film would have revolved around Captain Kirk and his crew, with the film taking inspiration from gangster films, and involving time travel. It would have also been standalone in nature, similar to an episode of Star Trek: The Original Series.

=== Bounty Law TV miniseries ===
In July 2019, Tarantino revealed that he had written a limited series of five half-hour episodes of the in-universe Once Upon a Time in Hollywood television series Bounty Law, and that he intended to shoot the episodes in black and white and on film. Tarantino doubted that Leonardo DiCaprio, the actor who portrayed Rick Dalton the star of Bounty Law, would want to reprise the role, but would be pleased if he could. He had an outline for a further three episodes, and named Showtime, HBO, Netflix and FX as possible platforms for the series. Speaking about the project in July 2021, Tarantino stated that he had written "five or six" episodes of the show, and that it would be inspired by shows such as Wanted Dead or Alive and The Rifleman. He believed it could be his next dramatic project following the stage adaptation of Once Upon a Time in Hollywood. Sony stated to Tarantino that they would make the series, should he decide to move forward with it, though he noted that was unlikely to happen for a "couple [of] years". In September 2021, it was announced that a script for a Bounty Law episode, titled "Incident at Inez" would be included in the hardcover release of the Once Upon a Time in Hollywood novelization.

== 2020s ==
=== First Blood ===
In June 2021, Tarantino revealed that he had an interest in directing a film adaptation of the novel First Blood, which had previously been adapted into the 1982 film of the same name. He voiced interest in casting Kurt Russell as the sheriff, and Adam Driver as Rambo. He states that the inspiration for his idea came from the dialogue in the novel, and David O. Russell's career, where Tarantino believed that for his film The Fighter, that he got "over himself, over being the auteur" and focused on making "a good movie," a strategy Tarantino would seek to emulate. However it was noted unlikely to be produced as Tarantino only intends to direct one more film.

=== Lancer ===
In July 2021, Tarantino opined that Robert Rodriguez could want to direct a Once Upon a Time in Hollywood spin-off movie about fictional actor Rick Dalton's work in the real-world television series Lancer, following up with "I could see that being a great Robert Rodriguez movie."

=== Untitled Cliff Booth project ===
When asked about Once Upon a Time in Hollywood character Cliff Booth's time during World War II, Tarantino stated that, "Someday I'll do his adventure in the POW camp."

In April 2025, it was reported that David Fincher had been hired to direct a sequel to Once Upon a Time in Hollywood, with Netflix acquiring the script from Tarantino, and that Brad Pitt would be reprising his role as Cliff Booth. Tarantino later elaborated on his decision to not direct the film as his final project stating: "I love this script, but I'm still walking down the same ground I've already walked. It just kind of unenthused me. This last movie, I've got to not know what I'm doing again. I've got to be in uncharted territory". According to DP Robert Richardson, Pitt's F1 (2025) commitment delayed pre-production, and the extra time made Tarantino question whether he wanted it to be his final film.

=== Snake Belly ===
In October 2021, Tarantino revealed that he was developing a Spaghetti Western comedy titled Snake Belly. He stated that he was "looking forward to shooting" the project, as each actor would speak a different language. The hero was set to be American, a "bad sheriff" was to be played by a German, a Mexican saloon girl was to be played by an Israeli, and a Mexican Bandido was to be played by an Italian.

=== Justified: City Primeval ===
In February 2022, Tarantino was set to direct an episode or two of Justified: City Primeval, since he is a fan of Elmore Leonard, the creator of the show's characters. Tarantino has taken inspiration from Leonard in Tarantino's own works, but by April 2022, Tarantino was confirmed to not be directing episodes of the series.

=== The Movie Critic ===
In November 2022, Tarantino announced plans to shoot an eight-episode television series in 2023; later revealing this project to be The Movie Critic, which he had adapted into a feature script before deciding not to pursue the project in either format. The title The Movie Critic first surfaced in March 2023 when it was reported to be Tarantino's tenth and final film. The protagonist was based on a real-life movie reviewer who wrote for a pornographic magazine and was to be played by a male American actor in his thirties. The character writes for a fictional magazine The Popstar Pages and takes place in California in 1977. The project was scheduled to begin filming in the fall of 2023 but delayed due to the 2023 SAG-AFTRA strike. Tarantino also met with Olivia Wilde about potentially starring in the film. One sequence was reported to film in 2024 to take advantage of $20 million in California Film Commission tax credits with full production beginning in early 2025. By April 2024, while Tarantino was writing the script for The Movie Critic, it had morphed into a continuation of the Cliff Booth character from Once Upon a Time in Hollywood (2019), with Brad Pitt set to reprise his role, prior to the project's cancellation. However, in an August 2025 podcast appearance, he explained that The Movie Critic "would have been a spiritual sequel to Once Upon a Time in Hollywood, but there were no crossover characters, Cliff Booth was never in The Movie Critic". He added: "I was so excited about the writing, but I wasn't really that excited about dramatizing what I wrote once we were in pre-production."

== Other projects ==
=== Cinema of the Outrageous ===
In 1983, Tarantino was interviewing various filmmakers for a book titled Cinema of the Outrageous. While the book was never completed, he would interview Joe Dante on the set of Gremlins (1984).

=== Warzone ===
Prior to directing My Best Friend's Birthday, Tarantino starred in a shot-on-video zombie film titled Warzone in the early '80s. It was described as "Assault on Precinct 13 (1976) with zombies", with a budget of $2,000. The film would be unfinished and never released.

=== Mort the Dead Teenager ===
In May 2002, Tarantino was set to executive produce a film adaptation of the Marvel Comics character Mort the Dead Teenager, via A Band Apart, for Dimension Films. In 2003, Jessica Simpson was reportedly cast as Mort's love interest, with test footage shot, before the project was scrapped.

=== Kill Bill video game ===
In October 2002, it was announced that Vivendi Games (originally Black Label Games) had acquired the rights to develop a video game based on Kill Bill that was meant to coincide with the film's 2003 release, with Tarantino serving as creative consultant. The project was shelved in 2003, with some demo footage leaking online.

=== Untitled Sergio Corbucci biography ===
In July 2012, Tarantino revealed he was writing a biographical novel about film director Sergio Corbucci.

=== The Hateful Eight novel ===
In January 2014, after the script for The Hateful Eight leaked online, Tarantino planned to scrap the film and adapt the script as a novel instead.

=== Django Unchained TV miniseries ===
In May 2014, Tarantino has said in an interview that he has ninety minutes of unused material and considered re-editing Django Unchained into a four-hour, four-night cable miniseries. Tarantino said that breaking the story into four parts would be more satisfying to audiences than a four-hour movie: "... it wouldn't be an endurance test. It would be a miniseries. And people love those."

=== The Hateful Eight stage adaptation ===
In early 2016, Tarantino announced that he plans to write and direct a stage play version of The Hateful Eight, something that he still had an interest in pursuing by June 2021.

=== Untitled 1970 project ===
In October 2016, Tarantino revealed he was researching the year 1970 for a project, saying "am I going to write a book? Maybe. Is it going to be a six-part podcast? Maybe. A feature documentary? Maybe. I'm figuring it out."

=== Once Upon a Time in Hollywood extended cut ===
In August 2019, it was reported that a four-hour extended cut of Once Upon a Time in Hollywood could arrive on Netflix, in a similar fashion to the extended cut of The Hateful Eight, something actor Brad Pitt confirmed in September 2019 as something Tarantino had discussed. In January 2020, Tarantino, stated that the extended cut would likely be available in approximately one year. In June 2021, Tarantino said the cut would probably be released "in a couple of years." It will be roughly three hours and 20 minutes and is currently intended for a theatrical release.

=== Reservoir Dogs remake, stage adaptation, or novel ===
In June 2021, Tarantino stated that he had considered a remake of his 1992 directorial debut Reservoir Dogs, as his tenth and final film, though he quickly iterated that he "won't do it". His idea would have featured the main cast being portrayed by black actors. Tarantino indicated that he would instead prefer to make a Reservoir Dogs stage adaptation.

Tarantino also stated, "I could see myself writing a novelization of Reservoir Dogs". Later revealing that he had already written two chapters of it, before deciding to switch his attention to writing a Once Upon a Time in Hollywood novelization instead.

=== Once Upon a Time in Hollywood stage adaptation ===
In June 2021, Tarantino stated that he had written a stage adaptation of Once Upon a Time in Hollywood, with it featuring material not featured in the original film or the 2021 novelization. Such material includes Rick Dalton's time in Italy, and him and the character Marvin having dinner with Sergio Corbucci and his wife at their favorite Japanese restaurant in Rome. In July 2021, Tarantino believed that it would be his next dramatic work, once he finishes Cinema Speculation. He hopes also that it would debut in the West End theatres of London.

=== Untitled western novel ===
In June 2021, Tarantino stated that he had written two chapters of an original western novel, which he had described as "kind of pulpy".

=== The Films of Rick Dalton ===
In July 2021, Tarantino revealed that he had written most of a career book, recounting the filmography of the Once Upon a Time in Hollywood character Rick Dalton as if he had actually existed. It would include synopsis, critical quotes from the time, and recounting his film and television career through to 1988. It details every one of Dalton's appearances on episodic television, with most of them being real programs and episodes as opposed to fictional ones (such as Bounty Law). The book's working title is The Man Who Would Be McQueen: The Films of Rick Dalton or simply The Films of Rick Dalton.

One such film that would be described would be the fictional vigilante movie The Fireman:

Cliff Booth in 1979 or '80, wrote a vigilante exploitation movie for Rick ... Rick read it and goes, 'we can do this better,' so Rick rewrites it and the two of them are going to produce it, they get the money, and it's a vigilante movie called, The Fireman. The lead character was in the Vietnam War– it's very similar to The Exterminator–he became a cop, and then he started seeing this whole group of bad apple cops that are killing guys and are completely corrupt. And they end up killing his partner, played by a very young Samuel L. Jackson ... The film becomes a real big hit, and that makes Rick, he gets a third career, going into the '80s, as a straight to video action star."

By December 2021, Tarantino expected the book to be released following the publication of Cinema Speculation.

=== Untitled film novelization ===
In July 2021, Tarantino stated, "What I'd like to do, though, at some point, is find a movie that's not mine and do a novelization," he said. "It has to be something that I could really go my own way, but not completely upend the apple cart."

=== True Romance novelization ===
In December 2021, Tarantino stated that a novelization of True Romance (1993), which he scripted, was a potential future project of his.

== See also ==
- List of works by Quentin Tarantino
