= Eric Clarke =

Eric Clarke or Clark may refer to:

- Eric Clarke (footballer) (born 1957), Australian rules footballer
- Eric Clarke (politician) (born 1933), British politician
- Eric Clarke (musicologist) (born 1955), British academic
- Eric "Fish" Clarke (born c. 1960), Jamaican reggae drummer
- Eric Clark (politician) (born 1951), former Secretary of State of Mississippi
- Eric D. Clark (born 1966), disco and house musician
- Eric Clark (footballer) (1916–2008), Australian rules footballer
- Eric Clark (author) (1937–2018), British author and investigative journalist
