= Faith (novel) =

1994 novel by Len Deighton

- First edition cover (publ. HarperCollins)
- Author: Len Deighton
- Language: English
- Genre: Spy novel
- Publisher: Hutchinson
- Publication date: 1994 (UK)
- Publication place: United Kingdom
- Media type: Print (Hardcover)
- Preceded by: Spy Sinker
- Followed by: Hope

Faith is a 1994 spy novel by Len Deighton. It is the first novel in the final trilogy of three about Bernard Samson, a middle-aged and somewhat jaded intelligence officer working for the British Secret Intelligence Service (MI6). Faith is part of the Faith, Hope and Charity trilogy, being followed by Hope and Charity. This trilogy is preceded by the Game, Set and Match and the Hook, Line and Sinker trilogies. Deighton's novel Winter (1987) is a prequel to the nine novels, covering the years 1900-1945 and providing the backstory to some of the characters.

The novel is set in 1987, when Soviet control of Eastern Europe is beginning to falter. It picks up the story from the end of Spy Line and Spy Sinker, with Fiona and Bernard Samson returning to London Central to rebuild their careers and marriage after recuperating with Bret Rensselaer in California.

== Plot summary ==
Dicky Cruyer, who is now acting Director of Operations, sends Bernard and another agent into East Germany to meet Verdi, a KGB defector who has promised to supply access to the KGB mainframe and wanted to see Bernard. Upon discovering a corpse at the meeting point they realise that they have been set up. After killing a Stasi agent and being sheltered by one of Fiona's networks they escape back to West Berlin. Dicky is desperate for the Verdi operation to succeed in order to secure Operations permanently and angle for the soon to be vacant Deputy Director General position. Fiona is now working for Dicky and backing the operation because VERDI has promised to bring information about the death of her sister Tessa during Fiona's escape from the East. Others high-up in the SIS are determined to block the operation.

Bernard knows Verdi from their past in Berlin, does not trust him, and is uncertain about the operation, but he must work with his longtime friend Werner Volkmann to determine what is happening and bring Verdi safely to London. Along the way, Bernard deals with office politics, enemy agents, his wife, his former girlfriend Gloria, the seduction of Dicky's wife by a KGB operative, and Tessa's husband's efforts to determine who was responsible for her death and seek retribution.

Bret makes a surprise return to London to take the Deputy Director General position. He appoints Gloria as his assistant and promises a major clean out of London Central. Gloria tells Bernard she is worried that files about her father's and Bernard's connection with Fiona's mission are being illegally erased from top secret databases.

Verdi tells Bernard the corpse at the meeting point was Timmermann, a freelance agent working for George and Fiona who was nosing around about Tessa and had to be eliminated, something Bret had tried to inform Bernard of via a cryptic message. Verdi is safely brought to London to finalise the deal where he hands over Tessa's post mortem report as promised. Verdi then spins a fanciful story to Bernard that the report is a fake and that Tessa is really still alive and being held captive in East Germany; something Bernard forces Werner to keep secret. Verdi is then killed by a sniper and everyone faces an official inquiry into the mission's failure.
