= Bernard Samson =

Protagonist of nine Len Deighton novels

- First appearance: Berlin Game
- Last appearance: Charity
- Created by: Len Deighton
- Portrayed by: Ian Holm

In-universe information
- Occupation: SIS agent
- Spouse: Fiona Samson
- Nationality: English

Bernard Samson is a fictional character created by Len Deighton. Samson is a middle-aged and somewhat jaded intelligence officer working for the Secret Intelligence Service (SIS) – usually referred to as "the Department" in the novels. He is a central character in three trilogies written by Deighton, set in the years 1983–1988, with a large gap between 1984 and 1987. The first trilogy comprises the books Berlin Game, Mexico Set and London Match, the second comprises Spy Hook, Spy Line and Spy Sinker, and the third and final trilogy comprises Faith, Hope and Charity. The plot of the entire trilogy of trilogies revolves around Samson's wife Fiona, also an intelligence officer, and which side she is really working for, after she has defected to the East Germans in the first trilogy, leaving a distraught Bernard with their two children. Her defection also causes some of his superiors to question his loyalty.

Samson undergoes sacrifice in his duties and is often ignored by his superiors, being passed over for promotion or sent to Berlin during Christmas. This is especially true in the first trilogy. Like Deighton's earlier unnamed spy character ("Harry Palmer" in the film adaptations), Samson is cynical and has a disrespect for his superiors and any ambitious colleagues.

Bernard's description appears in Berlin Game:

My photo stared back at me from its silver frame. Bernard Samson, a serious young man with a baby face, wavy hair and horn-rimmed glasses, looked nothing like the wrinkled old fool I shaved every morning.

— Len Deighton, Berlin Game

Bernard Samson is also the name of a Swiss Franciscan seller of indulgences, who was denounced by Zwingli in 1516.

== Early life ==
Bernard Samson is the son of Brian Samson, a British SIS operative who worked undercover in Germany during World War II and who became head of the Berlin Field Unit after the war. Brian Samson plays a small role in Deighton's 1987 prequel novel Winter. Bernard grew up in post-war Berlin before the wall was built and received a typical German education rather than a privileged English one and never went to university. Despite his ability to speak German fluently, he is seen as an Englishmen by Germans, and as a German by the British, leaving him unsure about which country he really belongs to. Bernard worked for his father from a young age with his best friend Werner Volkmann. They served as couriers making payments to agents and performing espionage related 'odd-jobs'. This enabled Bernard to make friendships and connections that would serve him well in his future work.

== Career in London ==
Bernard quit being a Berlin field agent after a mission in which a friend was killed and he was lucky to escape to the West alive. Bernard is troubled by all the violence he has both suffered and inflicted, has recurring nightmares and drinks too much. Bernard hoped to get the German Desk but was passed over for Dicky Cruyer, an Oxford man with no field experience. Bernard now runs errands for Dicky, whom he considers incompetent and dangerous. Bernard is continually being tipped to take over the Berlin Field Unit if Frank Harrington ever retires.

Bernard's old friend Werner was sacked by the department after a cable he was delivering turned up in the hands of the KGB. At the start of the novels, Bernard's wife Fiona, who went to Oxford with Dicky and got her job through Bernard, is working on the top floor and is a rising star in the department. Much of what happened to Bernard was done in order to keep him in the dark about his wife's real mission and he is led to believe that she is a KGB agent who used him, betrayed all his missions in exchange for keeping him safe and then defected to the East. This has left him embittered towards the department and very cynical.

Bernard is very stubborn and believes he knows better than his superiors who are all just desk men. He trusts no one except for his old friend Werner. His secretive and suspicious ways often keep Bernard alive but they just as often get him into trouble and cause harm to many of those around him.

== Analysis ==
Len Deighton has stated that Bernard's testimony in the books is not reliable. Samson is biased, especially towards his superiors, and is prone to regarding himself too highly. The true nature of his character can be gleaned from reading between the lines, or alternatively from the sixth novel, Spy Sinker, which recounts the events of the previous books from a third-person perspective, and casts doubt upon Bernard's reliability as a narrator, especially in his assessment of his colleagues' capabilities and motives.

Critic Wesley Britton has seen the Bernard Samson books as an echo of the Biblical story of Samson: like Samson, Bernard has his own Delilah, when his wife turns out to be an apparent traitor.

== In other media ==
Bernard Samson was played by Ian Holm and Fiona Samson by Mel Martin in a 1988 Granada Television adaptation of the first trilogy, entitled Game, Set and Match, transmitted as twelve 60 minute episodes. Filmed on location in Berlin and Mexico, the project included a large international cast with 3,000 extras and a budget of $8 million. It is considered the most ambitious espionage miniseries ever filmed. While critically acclaimed, the ratings for the series were poor.

In February 2008, director Quentin Tarantino expressed interest in developing the Game, Set and Match trilogy as a three-hour film. He is quoted as saying, "I would see if I could boil it down to the fate of the characters, and ignore all this Maquis double agent stuff.

== See also ==
Pictures from the Granada TV production of Game Set & Match
