= Natural Born Killers =

1994 crime film by Oliver Stone

- Theatrical release poster
- Directed by: Oliver Stone
- Screenplay by: David Veloz; Richard Rutowski; Oliver Stone
- Story by: Quentin Tarantino
- Produced by: Jane Hamsher; Don Murphy; Clayton Townsend
- Starring: Woody Harrelson; Juliette Lewis; Robert Downey Jr.; Tommy Lee Jones; Tom Sizemore
- Cinematography: Robert Richardson
- Edited by: Hank Corwin; Brian Berdan
- Production companies: Regency Enterprises; Alcor Films; Ixtlan Productions; New Regency; JD Productions
- Distributed by: Warner Bros.
- Release date: August 26, 1994
- Running time: 119 minutes
- Country: United States
- Language: English
- Budget: $34 million
- Box office: $110 million

Natural Born Killers is a 1994 American romantic crime film co-written and directed by Oliver Stone and starring Woody Harrelson, Juliette Lewis, Robert Downey Jr., Tommy Lee Jones, and Tom Sizemore. The film tells the story of two victims of traumatic childhoods who become lovers and mass murderers, and are irresponsibly glorified by the mass media.

The film is based on an original screenplay by Quentin Tarantino that was heavily revised by Stone, writer David Veloz, and associate producer Richard Rutowski. Tarantino received a story credit though he subsequently disowned the film. Jane Hamsher, Don Murphy, and Clayton Townsend produced the film, with Arnon Milchan, Thom Mount, and Stone as executive producers.

Natural Born Killers was released by Warner Bros. on August 26, 1994, in the United States, and screened at the Venice Film Festival on August 29, 1994 where it won Grand Jury Prize. It was a box office success, grossing $110 million against a production budget of $34 million, but received polarized reviews. Some critics praised the plot, acting, humor, and combination of action and romance, while others found the film overly violent and graphic. Notorious for its violent content and inspiring "copycat" crimes, the film was named the eighth most controversial film in history by Entertainment Weekly in 2006.

== Plot ==
Mickey Knox and his wife Mallory stop at a diner in the New Mexico desert. A duo of rednecks arrive and begin sexually harassing Mallory as she dances by a jukebox. She initially encourages it before beating one of the men viciously. Mickey joins her, and the couple murder everyone in the diner, save one customer, to whom they proudly declare their names before leaving. The couple camp in the desert, and Mallory reminisces about how she met Mickey, a meat deliveryman who serviced her family's household. After a whirlwind romance, Mickey is arrested for grand theft auto and sent to prison; he escapes and returns to Mallory's home. The couple murders Mallory's sexually abusive father and neglectful mother, but spare the life of Mallory's little brother, Kevin. The couple then have an unofficial marriage ceremony on a bridge.

Later, Mickey and Mallory hold a woman hostage in their hotel room. Angered by Mickey's desire for a threesome, Mallory leaves, and Mickey rapes the hostage. Mallory drives to a nearby gas station, where she flirts with a mechanic. They begin to have sex on the hood of a car, but after Mallory suffers a flashback of being raped by her father, and the mechanic recognizes her as a wanted murderer, Mallory kills him. The pair continue their killing spree, ultimately claiming 52 victims in New Mexico, Arizona and Nevada. Pursuing them is detective Jack Scagnetti, who became obsessed with mass murderers at the age of eight after having witnessed the murder of his mother at the hand of Charles Whitman. Beneath his heroic façade, he is also a violent psychopath and has murdered prostitutes in his past. Following the pair's murder spree is self-serving tabloid journalist Wayne Gale, who profiles them on his show American Maniacs, soon elevating them to cult-hero status.

Mickey and Mallory become lost in the desert after taking psychedelic mushrooms, and they stumble upon a ranch owned by Warren Red Cloud, a Navajo man who provides them food and shelter. As Mickey and Mallory sleep, Warren, sensing evil in the couple, attempts to exorcise the demon that he perceives in Mickey, chanting over him as he sleeps. Mickey, who has nightmares of his abusive parents, awakens during the exorcism and shoots Warren to death. As the couple flee, they feel inexplicably guilty and come across a giant field of rattlesnakes, where they are badly bitten. They reach a drugstore to purchase snakebite antidote, but the store is sold out. A pharmacist recognizes the couple and triggers an alarm before Mickey kills him. Police arrive shortly after and accost the couple and a shootout ensues. The police end the showdown by beating the couple while a news crew films the action.

One year later, the imprisoned Mickey and Mallory are thought to be criminally insane and are scheduled to be transferred to psychiatric hospitals, with Scagnetti overseeing their transfer. Warden Dwight McClusky tells the detective that he should kill the Knoxes during their transfer and claim they had tried to escape.

Meanwhile, Gale has persuaded Mickey to submit to a live interview that will air after the Super Bowl. During the interview, Mickey declares himself a "natural born killer", inspiring the other inmates to start a prison riot. After McClusky terminates the interview, Mickey is left alone with Gale, the film crew and several guards. He manages to overpower a guard and kill most of the people in the room, taking Gale and several others hostage. Gale and his crew give a live television report that profiles the riot. Meanwhile, when Scagnetti attempts to seduce Mallory in her cell, she beats him viciously before another guard subdues her with tear gas. Mickey and Gale reach Mallory's cell, where Mickey kills the guards and engages in a Mexican standoff with Scagnetti before Mallory kills him.

Gale's entire television crew is killed trying to escape the riot, while Gale himself begins indulging in violence, shooting at prison guards. Mickey and Mallory steal a van and escape into the woods with Gale, to whom they give a final interview before declaring that he must die. He attempts various arguments to change their minds, appealing to their trademark practice of leaving one survivor. Mickey informs him that they are leaving a witness to tell the tale: his camera. Gale accepts his fate and is shot to death. Unbeknownst to the three, the entire exchange is transmitted to a horrified news anchor through Gale's in-ear microphone.

Several years later, Mickey and Mallory, still fugitives, travel in an RV, as a pregnant Mallory watches their two children play.

== Cast ==
- Woody Harrelson as Mickey Knox
- Juliette Lewis as Mallory Wilson Knox
- Robert Downey Jr. as Wayne Gale
- Tom Sizemore as Detective Jack Scagnetti
- Tommy Lee Jones as Warden Dwight McClusky
- Rodney Dangerfield as Ed Wilson
- Edie McClurg as Mrs. Wilson
- Sean Stone as Kevin Wilson
- Russell Means as Warren Red Cloud (Old Indian Man)
- Jeremiah Bitsui as Young Indian Boy
- Lanny Flaherty as Earl
- Evan Handler as David
- Balthazar Getty as Gas station attendant
- Richard Lineback as Sonny
- Kirk Baltz as Roger
- Steven Wright as Dr. Emil Reingold
- Pruitt Taylor Vince as Deputy Warden Kavanaugh
- Joe Grifasi as Deputy Sheriff Duncan Homolka
- Everett Quinton as Deputy Wurlitzer
- Marshall Bell as Deputy
- Peter Crombie as Intense cop
- Grand L. Bush as Prison inmate
- Louis Lombardi as Deputy "Sparky"
- Dale Dye as Dale Wrigley
- Corey Everson as Mallory Knox in TV reconstruction
- O-Lan Jones as Mabel
- Jared Harris as London Boy
- James Gammon (uncredited) as Redneck buddy
- Mark Harmon (uncredited) as Mickey Knox in TV reconstruction
- Adrien Brody and David Pasquesi (uncredited) as Gale's cameramen
- Arliss Howard (uncredited) as Owen Traft, Mickey and Mallory's guardian angel / the demon

=== Director's cut ===
- Ashley Judd as Grace Mulberry
- Rachel Ticotin as Prosecutor Wanda Bisbing
- Peter and David Paul as Simon and Norman Hun
- Denis Leary and Bret Hart as prison inmates

== Analysis and themes ==
One of the central themes of Natural Born Killers is the relationship between real-life violence and the mass media's coverage of it. This thematic preoccupation was declared in the film's promotional materials, with its theatrical poster advertising it as a "bold new film that takes a look at a country seduced by fame, obsessed by crime, and consumed by the media."

The character of Wayne Gale, the television host of American Maniacs, functions in the film as a figurehead of lurid true crime television documentaries, which recycle real-life incidents of violence and criminal activity into entertainment for the general public. On several occasions, expressionistic edits featuring Gale as a blood-soaked Satan are interspersed into the film, which Muir suggests emphasizes the film's assertion that mass media and crime mutually reinforce one another.

Media representation of the nuclear family has been identified as another theme in the film, particularly with the depiction of Mallory's dysfunctional family life, which includes a neglectful mother and a sexually abusive father. Muir notes that the sequence depicting Mallory's home life—presented as a television sitcom with the title I Love Mallory (a parody of I Love Lucy)—charts "the colossal gulf between the imagery sold to America regarding family life and the truth, for many Americans, of such family life in the 1990s." The "sitcom" representation of Mallory's household results in a visual dichotomy between her "life as she imagined it should be (replete with an oppressive laugh track eradicating any scary sense of ambiguity)" and the "grim truth of it."

Ian Cooper wrote that Mickey Knox's prison interview "parodies Geraldo Rivera's jailhouse interview with [Charles] Manson."

== Production ==
=== Concept ===
Natural Born Killers was based on a screenplay written by Quentin Tarantino, in which a married couple suddenly decide to go on a killing spree. Tarantino had sold an option for his script to producers Jane Hamsher and Don Murphy for $10,000 after he had tried, and failed, to direct it himself for $500,000. Hamsher and Murphy subsequently sold the screenplay to Warner Bros. Pictures. Around the same time, Oliver Stone was made aware of the script. He was keen to find something more straightforward than his previous production, Heaven & Earth (1993), a difficult shoot which had left him exhausted.

David Veloz, associate producer Richard Rutowski, and Stone rewrote Tarantino's script, keeping much of the dialogue but changing the focus of the film from journalist Wayne Gale to Mickey and Mallory. The script was revised so drastically that Tarantino was credited for the story only. In a 1993 interview, Tarantino stated that he did not hold any animosity towards Stone, and that he wished the film well.

Initially, when producers Hamsher and Murphy had first brought the script to Stone's attention, he had envisioned it as an action film; "something Arnold Schwarzenegger would be proud of." As the project developed however, incidents such as the O. J. Simpson case, the Menendez brothers case, the Tonya Harding/Nancy Kerrigan incident, the Rodney King incident, and the Waco siege all took place. Stone came to feel that the media was heavily involved in the outcome of all of these cases, and that the media had become an all-pervasive entity which marketed violence and suffering for the good of ratings. As such, he changed the tone of the film from one of purely action to a "vicious, coldhearted farce" on the media. Coloring Stone's approach to the material, and contributing to the violent nature of the film, were the anger and sadness he felt at the breakdown of his second marriage. He also said in an interview that the film was influenced by the "vitality" of Indian cinema.

=== Casting ===
Stone cast Woody Harrelson partly because, "frankly, he had that American, trashy look. There's something about Woody that evokes Kentucky or white trash." At the time, Harrelson was primarily known for his comedic performances, namely his role on the sitcom Cheers, and Stone was compelled to cast him against type. Stone cast Lewis for a similar reason, noting that, despite her success as portraying a defiled teenage daughter in Cape Fear (1991), he felt she could "pull off white trash, too. Juliette has malice in her eyes. She's got adorable eyes, but they jump and they gleam. I just felt they [were both] right. They didn't feel like they were upper-class people." Stone tried to convince Lewis to gain muscle mass for her role as Mallory so that she looked tougher, but she refused, saying she wanted the character to look like a pushover, not a bodybuilder.

Robert Downey Jr. was cast as Wayne Gale, the reporter chronicling the Knoxes; Downey prepared for his role as reporter Wayne Gale by spending time with Australian TV shock-king Steve Dunleavy, and later convinced Stone to allow him to portray Gale with an Australian accent. Tom Sizemore was cast as Detective Jack Scagnetti, the psychotic police officer with murderous impulses himself, while Tommy Lee Jones was cast as Dwight McClusky, a prison warden who appears in the last act of the film. Rodney Dangerfield, primarily known as a stand-up comedian, portrayed Mallory's rapist father and was allowed by Stone to rewrite all of his own character's lines.

=== Filming ===
Principal photography took 56 days to shoot. Filming locations included the Rio Grande Gorge Bridge just west of Taos, New Mexico, where the wedding scene was filmed, and Stateville Correctional Center in Joliet, Illinois, where the prison riot was filmed. In Stateville, 80% of the prisoners are incarcerated for violent crimes. For the first two weeks on location at the prison, the extras were actual inmates with rubber weapons. For the subsequent two weeks, 200 extras were needed because the Stateville inmates were on lockdown. According to Tom Sizemore, during filming on the prison set, Stone would play African tribal music at full blast between takes to keep the frantic energy up. While shooting the POV scene wherein Mallory runs into the wire mesh, director of photography Robert Richardson broke his finger and the replacement cameraman cut his eye. According to Oliver Stone, he was not popular with the camera department on set that day. For the scenes involving rear projection, the projected footage was shot prior to principal photography, then edited together, and projected onto the stage, behind the live actors. For example, when Mallory drives past a building and flames are projected onto the wall, this was shot live using footage projected onto the facade of a real building. An alternate ending was filmed but not used, in which Mickey and Mallory are shot dead by Arliss Howard's character. Stone decided against using this ending because he believed "the 1990s were a time when the bad guys got away with it".

The famous Coca-Cola polar bear ad Northern Lights, is seen twice during the film. According to Stone, Coca-Cola approved the use of the ad without having a full idea of what the film was about. When they saw the completed film, they were furious.

==== Visual style ====
Natural Born Killers was filmed and edited in a frenzied and psychedelic style and features both color and black and white cinematography, as well as animation (directed by Mike Smith), and other unusual color schemes and visual compositions. Editing of the film lasted approximately 11 months, with the final film containing almost 3,000 cuts (most films have 600–700). The film also employs a wide range of camera angles, featuring Dutch tilts prominently throughout, with the camera rarely angling along a horizontal field of vision. Film scholar Robert Kolker notes that the Dutch angles employment in the film are "the visual equivalent of a profound dislocation, a loss of object constancy, the slipperiness of subjectivity itself." Kolker comments that, unlike such films as Bonnie and Clyde from which Natural Born Killers drew influence, "from the very beginning... the viewer is forced into a dual situation, neither one of which allows easy access to the main characters. One situation, continued throughout the film, is a kind of rhythmic attention created by a startling flow of images. Stone builds his visuals on unexpected linkages and disorienting juxtapositions within the shots and edits."

Because the film is thematically preoccupied with media, Stone sought to implement visual elements of popular television into the film's visual tableau: "It had never quite been done before – a mixture of stocks and styles. I was influenced, I have to say, by MTV and some of the styles I saw in the early '80s and '90s on television. But no one had tried that style over the course of 90, 100 minutes." Commercials which were commonly on the air at the time of the film's release make brief, intermittent appearances as well.

Concurrent with Stone's preoccupation with television as both a visual and thematic reference point, portions of the film are narrated through parodies of popular television series, including a sequence presented in the style of a sitcom about Mallory's dysfunctional family (titled I Love Mallory), a parody of I Love Lucy. In the film's final montage, splices of real-life television news coverage of various criminal cases of the time are included, such as the O. J. Simpson case, the Menendez brothers, and the Tonya Harding/Nancy Kerrigan incident. Film scholar John Kenneth Muir notes this inclusion as an "exclamation point" concluding the film's thesis: "It seems to say, 'Welcome to the tabloid-TV culture of America in the 1990s, where crime pays and pays well.'"

=== Music ===
The film's soundtrack was produced by Stone and Trent Reznor of Nine Inch Nails, who reportedly watched the film over 50 times to "get in the mood". Reznor reportedly produced the soundtrack while on tour. On his approach to compiling the soundtrack, Reznor told MTV:

I suggested to Oliver [Stone] to try to turn the soundtrack into a collage-of-sound, kind of the way the movie used music: make edits, add dialog, and make it something interesting, rather than a bunch of previously-released music.

Some songs were written especially for the film or soundtrack, such as "Burn" by Nine Inch Nails.

== Release, reception and legacy ==
=== Box office ===
In its opening weekend, Natural Born Killers grossed a total of $11.2 million in 1,510 theaters, finishing first at the US box office. It finished its theatrical run in the United States and Canada with a total gross of $50.3 million. It grossed an estimated $60 million internationally for a worldwide total of $110 million against its $34 million budget.

=== Critical response ===
On review aggregator Rotten Tomatoes, Natural Born Killers has an approval rating of 50% based on 50 reviews, with an average rating of 5.8/10. The website's critical consensus reads, "Natural Born Killers explodes off the screen with style, but its satire is too blunt to offer any fresh insight into celebrity or crime – pummeling the audience with depravity until the effect becomes deadening." Metacritic, which uses a weighted average, assigned the film a score of 74 out of 100, based on 20 critics, indicating "generally favorable" reviews. Audiences polled by CinemaScore gave the film an average grade of "B−" on an A+ to F scale.

Roger Ebert of the Chicago Sun-Times gave the film four stars out of four and wrote, "Seeing this movie once is not enough. The first time is for the visceral experience, the second time is for the meaning." On his television show, his partner Gene Siskel agreed with him, adding extra praise to the scene featuring Rodney Dangerfield.

=== Criticism ===
Other critics found the film unsuccessful in its aims. Much of the criticism centered around the perception that the film was not effective as a satire and its message was muddled. Janet Maslin of the New York Times wrote, "While 'Natural Born Killers' affects occasional disgust at the lurid world of Mickey and Mallory, it more often seems enamored of their exhilarating freedom. If there is a juncture at which these caricatures start looking like nihilist heroes, then the film passes that point many times." Hal Hinson of The Washington Post voiced a similar concern, saying "'Killers' is intended as a gonzo critique of the mass media and, by extension, of the bloodthirsty legions of couch potatoes whose prurient taste guarantees that the garbage rises to the top of the charts. But the film doesn't make it as a piece of social criticism. Primarily this is because the movie's jittery, psychedelic style is so obviously a kick for Stone to orchestrate. Bloody, pulpy excess is his thing; it's what he does best." Hinson noted the film also loses its "symbolic footing" when it transitions into a prison film.

Some critics felt the film's focus on the mass media as the main culprit of society's ills rang hollow or that the film did not adequately hold the characters of Mickey and Mallory accountable for their actions. Maslin continued, "for all its surface passions, Natural Born Killers never digs deep enough to touch the madness of such events, or even to send them up in any surprising way. Mr. Stone's vision is impassioned, alarming, visually inventive, characteristically overpowering. But it's no match for the awful truth."

James Berardinelli gave the film a negative review but his criticism was different from many other such pans, which generally said that Oliver Stone was a hypocrite for making an ultra-violent film in the guise of a critique of American attitudes. Berardinelli noted that the movie "hits the bullseye" as a satire of America's lust for bloodshed, but repeated Stone's main point so often and so loudly that it became unbearable.

Stone got in trouble with the Native American community for the use of Russell Means.

In 2015, Taste of Cinema ranked the film 22nd among the "30 Great Psychopath Movies That Are Worth Your Time", and GamesRadar+ named the two lead characters among the "50 Creepiest Movie Psychopaths.

=== Accolades ===
At the 1994 Stinkers Bad Movie Awards, Harrelson was nominated for Worst Actor but lost to Bruce Willis for Color of Night and North. The film was nominated for Worst Picture but lost to North.

=== Year-end lists ===
- 2nd – David Stupich, The Milwaukee Journal
- 8th – Roger Ebert, The Chicago Sun-Times
- 8th – Michael Mills, The Palm Beach Post
- 8th – Christopher Sheid, The Munster Times
- Top 10 (not ranked) – Bob Carlton, The Birmingham News
- Honorable mention – Kenneth Turan, Los Angeles Times
- Honorable mention – Dennis King, Tulsa World
- Honorable mention – Howie Movshovitz, The Denver Post
- Honorable mention – Dan Webster, The Spokesman-Review
- Best-worst movie – Todd Anthony, Miami New Times
- 1st worst – Peter Travers, Rolling Stone
- 1st worst – Dan Craft, The Pantagraph
- 2nd worst – John Hurley, Staten Island Advance
- 10th worst – Glenn Lovell, San Jose Mercury News
- 10th worst – Sean P. Means, The Salt Lake Tribune
- Worst films (not ranked) – Jeff Simon, The Buffalo News
- Top 4 worst (not ranked) – Stephen Hunter, The Baltimore Sun

=== Retrospective ===
For the film's 25th anniversary in 2019, critics wrote about the film's impact in popular culture and its relevance today. Writing for The Guardian, Charles Bramesco argued the film's rebuke of the media as responsible for violence does not hold up to current times. Bramesco wrote, "With every public bloodbath [in the news today], discourse inches closer to accepting their root cause as a combination of lax gun laws and an undercurrent of psychosis endemic to those feeling marginalized from society. Stone’s inquest may have been a shock to the system at the time, but his tracing of that psychosis back to the evils of television scans as borderline reactionary to present-day sensibilities." Bramesco also noted the film's inclusion of Native American mysticism into its plot felt like a "white understanding of native culture."

Critic Owen Gleiberman said the film still "captures how our parasitical relationship to pop culture can magnify the cycle of violence...'Natural Born Killers' was the movie that glimpsed the looking glass we were passing through, the new psycho-metaphysical space we were living inside — the roller-coaster of images and advertisements, of entertainment and illusion, of demons that come up through fantasy and morph into daydreams, of vicarious violence that bleeds into real violence.”

=== Home media ===
Natural Born Killers was released on VHS in 1995 by Warner Home Video. A director's cut version of the film was released the following year on VHS by Vidmark/Lionsgate, who also released a non-anamorphic DVD of the director's cut in 2000. Distribution rights to Stone's director's cut reverted from Lionsgate to Warner Bros. in 2009, after which Warner issued an anamorphic DVD edition as well as a Blu-ray. Shout Factory licensed the title for a 4K UHD release and released it on September 26, 2023.

=== Controversies ===
==== Quentin Tarantino ====
After Quentin Tarantino attempted to publish his original screenplay to Natural Born Killers as a paperback book, as he had done with his scripts for True Romance and his own directorial efforts, Reservoir Dogs and Pulp Fiction, the producers of Natural Born Killers filed a lawsuit against Tarantino, claiming that when he sold the script to them, he had forfeited the publishing rights; eventually, Tarantino was allowed to publish his original script. Tarantino disowned the film, saying, "I hated that fucking movie. If you like my stuff, don't watch that movie." He also claimed to have never watched the film from beginning to end.

=== Censorship ===
When the film was first submitted to the Motion Picture Association of America (MPAA), employees told Stone they would give it an NC-17 unless he edited it. As such, Stone removed some violence by cutting approximately four minutes of footage and the MPAA re-rated the film as an R. In 1996, a Director's Cut was released on home video by Vidmark Entertainment and Pioneer Entertainment. Warner Home Video later released this cut on Blu-ray.

The film was banned in Ireland, including – controversially – from cinema clubs. The ban was later lifted. In the UK, though the cinema release was delayed while the BBFC investigated reports that the film caused copycat murders in the US and France, it was finally shown in cinemas in February 1995. The BBFC classified the film uncut at 18, citing strong bloody violence and sexual violence. The film was also banned in the Philippines by the Movie and Television Review and Classification Board (MTRCB), a government agency.

The original intended UK home video release in March 1996 was cancelled due to the Dunblane massacre in Scotland. In the meantime, Channel Five showed the film in November 1997. It was finally released on video in July 2001. Entertainment Weekly ranked the film as the eighth most controversial film ever.

==== "Copycat" crimes ====
From almost the moment of its release, the film has been accused of encouraging and inspiring numerous murderers in North America, including the perpetrators of the 1997 Heath High School shooting and the Columbine High School massacre. The Columbine killers even code-named their attack "NBK", an initialism for Natural Born Killers.

== See also ==
- Charles Starkweather
- Tabloid talk show
- Tabloid television
- Postmodernist film
- Cable news
- List of films featuring hallucinogens
- True Romance - Tony Scott's 1993 film also written by Quentin Tarantino
- Badlands – Terrence Malick's 1973 film also about killers in love
- Maximalist film

== Sources ==
- Kolker, Robert Phillip (2000). A Cinema of Loneliness: Penn, Stone, Kubrick, Scorsese, Spielberg, Altman. Oxford: Oxford University Press. ISBN 978-0-19-512350-0.
- Levy, Emanuel (1999). Cinema of Outsiders: The Rise of American Independent Film. New York: New York University Press. ISBN 978-0-8147-5289-0.
- Muir, John Kenneth (2011). Horror Films of the 1990s. Jefferson, North Carolina: McFarland. ISBN 978-0-7864-8480-5.
- Seitz, Matt Zoller (2016). The Oliver Stone Experience. New York: Abrams. ISBN 978-1-61312-814-5.
