= Kevin Thomas (film critic) =

American film critic (born June 12, 1936)

- Born: Kevin Thomas; June 12, 1936 (age 90); Los Angeles, California, U.S.
- Education: Gettysburg College; Pennsylvania State University
- Occupations: Film critic, writer

Kevin Thomas (born June 12, 1936) is an American film critic who wrote reviews on a regular basis for the Los Angeles Times from 1962 until 2005. His long tenure makes him the longest-running film critic among major United States newspapers.

Thomas is known for giving fairly positive reviews compared to other critics, and certainly less critical than Kenneth Turan, who joined the Los Angeles Times in 1991. However, Thomas also gained fame after being punched in the nose by Tommy Sands, whose acting he criticized in a review of None but the Brave (1965).

== Early life and education ==
Thomas was born in Los Angeles in 1936. He earned a bachelor's degree from Gettysburg College in 1958 and master's degree from Pennsylvania State University in 1960.

== Honors and awards ==
In 2003, the National Lesbian and Gay Journalists Association gave Thomas a Lifetime Achievement Award. Thomas holds an honorary position on the advisory board of GALECA: The Society of LGBTQ Entertainment Critics and its Dorian Awards.

In his 2022 book Cinema Speculation – which includes an entire chapter about Thomas – Quentin Tarantino said that Kevin Thomas was the only critic at the Los Angeles Times who seemed to enjoy his job.

A documentary on Thomas premiered in 2025 at the Wisconsin Film Festival.
