= Len Deighton's Action Cook Book =

British cookbook

Len Deighton's Action Cook Book is a 1965 collection of cookery strips (known as a cookstrip, an invention of Len Deighton's from his days as a student at the Royal College of Art) originally published in The Observer newspaper, with additional information and notes. Aimed at "an audience of men unskilled at knowing their way around the kitchen", the book has been described as a cult classic from the period and helped pave the transition from cooking being only for women, into being a sophisticated expectation of a modern man.

The book was reissued in 2009 by Harper Perennial (an imprint of HarperCollins) with original content and artwork, the 2nd edition of the cover artwork, and an additional updated introduction.

== Sequel ==
A follow-up book, Où Est Le Garlic?, was published later in 1965, and was Deighton's final cookbook. According to Deighton, the publishers had originally intended to "impregnante" this second volume with the smell of garlic, to attract attention in bookshops, but the plan was discarded after preemptive complaints from warehouse workers.

== In popular culture ==
At least one of the cookstrips from The Observer is pinned up in Deighton's spy hero's kitchen in the 1965 film of his 1962 novel The IPCRESS File.

The cookbook was mentioned in an episode of The Supersizers..., focusing on the extremely high quantities of alcohol required for a 1970s cocktail party. It recommends half a 70 cl bottle (35 cl) of spirit (e.g. rum, vodka, etc.) per person every two hours of a party, increasing to three-quarters (52.5 cl) of a bottle per person after 2 hours "since drinking will increase if they haven't gone home by then" (p126). This equates to 87.5 cl of spirits per person for a four-hour party.

== See also ==
- Len Deighton bibliography
