= The Outfit (1973 film) =

1973 film by John Flynn

- Theatrical poster
- Directed by: John Flynn
- Screenplay by: John Flynn; Walter Hill (Note: Uncredited.)
- Based on: The Outfit by Richard Stark
- Produced by: Carter De Haven
- Starring: Robert Duvall; Karen Black; Joe Don Baker; Robert Ryan; Joanna Cassidy
- Cinematography: Bruce Surtees
- Edited by: Ralph E. Winters
- Music by: Jerry Fielding
- Production companies: Aurora Enterprises, Ltd.
- Distributed by: Metro-Goldwyn-Mayer
- Release date: October 19, 1973
- Running time: 103 minutes
- Country: United States
- Language: English

The Outfit is a 1973 American neo-noir crime thriller film directed by John Flynn and starring Robert Duvall, Karen Black, Joe Don Baker, Robert Ryan, and Joanna Cassidy. The film follows a bank robber who, after serving a prison sentence for his crime, launches a revenge plot against the crime outfit that owned the bank. Flynn's screenplay is an adaptation of the novel of the same name by Richard Stark, pseudonym of Donald E. Westlake. It features a character modeled on Stark's fictional character Parker, who was introduced in The Hunter (1962).

== Plot ==
A pair of hitmen drive to Eddie Macklin's house and kill him as he builds a brick wall in his backyard. Eddie's brother Earl is released from prison in Illinois after a 27-month term for carrying a concealed weapon. His girlfriend Bett picks him up and takes him to a motel. She informs Earl of his brother's execution by the Outfit. Earl realises that the motel stay is a setup, and when one of the hitmen who killed his brother bursts into the room, Earl ambushes him and tortures him for information.

Macklin lets the hitman live and sends him back to Chicago as a warning. Bett confesses that the Outfit tortured her and threatened to cut her face up if she didn't lure Earl to the motel. His next move is to rob a poker game where Outfit member Jake Menner is playing. Menner explains that the bank that Eddie and Earl robbed together was an Outfit cover, so the contract on the two of them is simple retribution. Macklin calculates that the Outfit owes him $250,000 for the trouble it has caused him. He says whatever he earns by ripping off the Outfit's operations in the meantime is just gravy. Then, he shoots Menner in the hand as revenge for the treatment of Bett.

Menner tells his boss Mailer that the Outfit has a problem, but Mailer insists that it is Menner's problem to solve. The hitmen who killed Eddie are sent to kill Macklin's old partner Cody at a diner that he owns. Cody gets them to leave by pointing out that the town sheriff is there; then he and Macklin hatch a plan to keep robbing the Outfit, using Bett as a driver. Their next target is a dive restaurant that does not even have a safe. On their way out with the money, the cook throws a bowl of black pepper at Cody and three gunmen lie in wait outside the restaurant. Bett mows two of them down and the trio escapes.

Macklin and Cody go to Chemey to get a new car, since theirs has been made. Chemey's sister-in-law makes a pass at Cody. When he turns her down, she claims that he tried to rape her. That causes a physical confrontation that Chemey manages to deflate, allowing Cody and Macklin to leave in their new car.

Their next target is a much bigger operation. Cody poses as a mailman, and Macklin as a maintenance man. They knock out a secretary and make their way into a warren of back rooms where they rob the safe. Macklin and Cody then corner Mailer at a horse auction. He amiably agrees to pay the $250,000, but he warns Macklin to stop knocking off his businesses.

Mailer is furious that Macklin was able to be "close enough to touch" him. He orders him killed. At the payoff, Macklin quickly realizes it is a setup and that the briefcase is filled with newspaper instead of money. He and Cody manage to escape by tripping a fire alarm, enraging Mailer further.

After another ambush on the side of a road led by Menner, Cody and Macklin manage to kill him and his men. In the melee, however, Bett is shot and killed. Enraged, Macklin plans a last-ditch assault on Mailer's well-guarded home. Cody warns that it will be easy to get in but nearly impossible to get out. They hijack one of the Outfit's cars and use it to get past the gates. Inside the house, Cody plants a bomb under a table. The duo goes upstairs to hunt for Mailer, who spies Cody in his shaving mirror. He manages to ambush Cody, shooting him in the gut. Macklin is waiting for Mailer in the hallway—the still-conscious Cody shoots Mailer in the back, then Macklin finishes Mailer.

Once the bomb goes off, Macklin puts on a white medical coat and helps Cody out of the house. The police, fire department, and an ambulance have arrived. Posing as a medic, Macklin puts Cody into the back of an ambulance, and they laugh about how easy it was to escape.

== Cast ==
- Robert Duvall as Earl Macklin
- Karen Black as Bett Harrow
- Joe Don Baker as Jack Cody
- Robert Ryan as Mailer
- Joanna Cassidy as Rita
- Timothy Carey as Jake Menner
- Richard Jaeckel as Chemey
- Bill McKinney as Buck
- Sheree North as Buck's Wife
- Tom Reese as Hit Man
- Felice Orlandi as Frank Orlandi
- Marie Windsor as Madge Coyle
- Jane Greer as Alma
- Henry Jones as Doctor
- Elisha Cook as Carl
- Anita O'Day as herself
- Tony Trabert as himself
- Archie Moore as Packard
- George Savalas as Mickey

== Production ==
=== Development ===
The novel was published in 1963. It was the third Parker novel. It first appeared as a novella in the April 1963 issue of Manhunt magazine. Film rights were bought by Carter de Haven who set the film up at Metro-Goldwyn-Mayer. John Flynn, who had been a long time fan of the Parker novels, was brought in to write and direct. Contrary to rumors, Flynn claimed the film was always intended to be set in the present day and not in the 1940s. Despite the fact that James T. Aubrey, head of Metro-Goldwyn-Mayer, wanted the ending changed to make it more upbeat, Flynn remained very fond of the movie.

=== Casting ===
In February 1973, Charlton Heston wrote in his journal that he "found time to read The Outfit again, which I’d turned down after a skim. Maybe I made a mistake. It’s a good script and should make a good film." He does not appear in the final film. Professional football player Carl Eller was also at one time considered for a role in the film, but was ultimately not cast.

=== Filming ===
Principal photography of The Outfit took place in Los Angeles and at the Metro-Goldwyn-Mayer studio lot in the spring of 1973. Additional photography occurred at the historic Jansse mansion in Holmby Hills.

== Release ==
The Outfit was given a limited theatrical release in the United States on October 19, 1973, opening in Chicago and Detroit. The film opened in New York City the following year in April 1974, followed by a Los Angeles release on October 2, 1974.

=== Home media ===
The Warner Archive Collection released the film on DVD on November 16, 2010. Arrow Video released a limited edition Blu-ray on July 27, 2026.

== Reception ==
=== Critical response ===
Roger Ebert gave the film three-and-a-half stars out of four and praised it as "a classy action picture, very well directed and acted." However, Time wrote, "Director Flynn makes a movie that has been seen before, without either the skill or spirit that distinguished such excellent predecessors as Point Blank and Get Carter." In his review for The New York Times, Vincent Canby wrote, "The Outfit is not really a bad movie. It doesn't fail in an attempt to do something beyond its means. It doesn't attempt to do anything except pass the time, which simply isn't good enough when most of us have access to television."

Westlake called it "one movie made from a Stark book that got the feeling right. That movie is done flat, just like the books." Westlake felt Flynn "put together an incredible cast... He wrote it “period,” but then de-emphasized that. He had everybody moving fast. It was efficient but it was also thoughtful."

The Outfit (much like 1973's The Friends of Eddie Coyle and other crime films of this period) has been included on many lists of lesser known films recommended by 21st century film analysts.

Quentin Tarantino has a chapter on the movie in his 2022 book Cinema Speculation.

== See also ==
- List of American films of 1973

== Sources ==
- Heston, Charlton (1979). The Actor's Life: Journals, 1956–1976. New York City, New York: Pocket Books. ISBN 978-0-671-83016-8.
- McGilligan, Patrick (2005). Backstory 4: Interviews with Screenwriters of the 1970s and 1980s. Berkeley, California: University of California Press. ISBN 978-0-520-24517-4.
- Silver, Alain; Ward, Elizabeth, eds. (1992). Film Noir: An Encyclopedic Reference to the American Style (3rd ed.). Woodstock, New York: The Overlook Press. ISBN 978-0-879-51479-2.
- Tarantino, Quentin (2022). Cinema Speculation. New York City, New York: Harper. ISBN 978-0-06-311258-2.
