= Hope (Deighton novel) =

1995 spy novel by Len Deighton

- First edition (UK)
- Author: Len Deighton
- Language: English
- Genre: Spy novel
- Publisher: HarperCollins
- Publication date: 1995 (UK)
- Publication place: United Kingdom
- Media type: Print (Hardcover)
- Preceded by: Faith
- Followed by: Charity

Hope is a 1995 spy novel by Len Deighton. It is the second novel in the final trilogy of three about Bernard Samson, a middle-aged and somewhat jaded intelligence officer working for the British Secret Intelligence Service (MI6). Hope is part of the Faith, Hope and Charity trilogy, being preceded by Faith and followed by Charity. This trilogy is preceded by the Game, Set and Match and the Hook, Line and Sinker trilogies. Deighton's novel Winter (1987) is a prequel to the nine novels, covering the years 1900-1945 and providing the backstory to some of the characters.

== Plot summary ==
A severely wounded courier working for George Kosinski turns up at the flat in London where Bernard and Fiona are now living, since Tessa Kosinski left it to Fiona. George, who is now a tax exile living in Zurich, arrives to take the courier to a doctor and asks Bernard to keep it quiet because he doesn't want Inland Revenue to know he was in the country.

Suspecting that a Stasi agent travelled to Zurich to meet George, Bernard and Dicky Cruyer travel to Zurich to question George. George sent Tessa's engagement ring, given to him by the Stasi, to be cleaned and then disappeared. Bernard and Dicky track him to his old family estate in Poland where his brother Stefan resides. Stefan says that George was murdered by Russian Army defectors and all that was recovered was a leg mauled by wild dogs, and he has a death certificate to prove it. A hand with George's signet ring is later shown to the British Embassy as further proof and sent to Dicky in London. The Stasi try to steal the hand back before it can be forensically analysed but Dicky chases and shoots the agent and recovers the hand.

Bret Rensselaer and Gloria are implementing harsh budget cuts across the SIS. With the backing of Fiona and Dicky, Bernard gets a permanent job as Frank Harrington's deputy in Berlin. There he must deal with one of Fiona's networks in East Germany being captured because the head man was a Stasi plant. A young agent Bernard has worked with is killed and delivered to Gloria's hotel room as retaliation for Bernard killing a Stasi agent in Faith. Bernard also learns that Fiona was in love with her KGB minder, a double agent called Kennedy, whom Bernard shot while rescuing Fiona. Fiona and children decide to spend Christmas in the Caribbean with her father.

Bernard is sent back into Poland to extract George. He discovers that George and Stefan have been working for Polish intelligence all the time they have been travelling in the West. George fled to Zurich to try to get out but the Stasi tracked him down. They told George that Timmerman had brokered a deal and if George returns to Poland and renounces his British citizenship they will reunite him with Tessa, who is pregnant, and they can live peacefully in Poland. Bernard convinces George that this is nonsense and Tessa is dead and that London will treat him well if he comes clean. George agrees to be smuggled to Sweden in a light plane and after shooting George's tail they escape. Bernard hands George over to be shipped off to London for interrogation. Bernard and Gloria fly back to London for Christmas in the Learjet Bret chartered as an air ambulance in case anyone was injured.
