= MAMista =

Novel by Len Deighton

First edition (publ. HarperCollins)

MAMista is a novel by Len Deighton set in a fictional South American country, Spanish Guyana, in the late 1980s or early 1990s. It is influenced by Graham Greene and Joseph Conrad.

== Plot ==
The central character is Angel Paz, the nephew of an American gangster Don Arturo, who goes to the fictional country at his father's suggestion; Arturo wanted to prove to Angel that Marxism was dead. While there, he meets Ralph Lucas, an Australian who had been sent by his employer, a major pharmaceutical company, to supply medicines to the "people in the southern provinces" which are controlled by the "Movimiento de Accion Marxista", the MAM of the title. Lucas begins a relationship with one of the leaders of the MAM, Inez Cassidy.

The guerrillas raid an American base and kidnap two Americans intending to ransom them for the cost of the medicine the group needs; one of them kills himself shortly after seeing his wife killed in an explosion caused by the guerrillas. The other, along with other members of the guerrilla party and Lucas, die after getting lost in the forest after the raid. Angel escapes back to Los Angeles, but is murdered by Arturo on arrival.

== Critical reception ==
Kirkus Reviews called MAMista a "stately, outstanding mix of tragedy and black farce." By contrast, Publishers Weekly called it "ultimately disappointing with its unraveling plot and elusive characters."
