= Cinema Speculation =

2022 nonfiction book by Quentin Tarantino

- First edition cover
- Author: Quentin Tarantino
- Audio read by: Edoardo Ballerini; Quentin Tarantino
- Language: English
- Subject: Film
- Publisher: Harper
- Publication date: November 1, 2022
- Publication place: United States
- Media type: Print (hardcover)
- Pages: 400
- ISBN: 978-0-06-311258-2
- OCLC: 1348950198

Cinema Speculation is a 2022 nonfiction book by American filmmaker Quentin Tarantino, published by Harper on November 1, 2022.

== Background ==
Cinema Speculation is Tarantino's debut work of nonfiction and combines "film criticism, film theory, a feat of reporting, and wonderful personal history". The book is a collection of essays organized around "key American films from the 1970s" which Tarantino saw in his youth, ranging from blaxploitation films to all the Best Picture nominees of 1970. It was inspired by the film writing of critic Pauline Kael.

== Contents ==
The first and last chapters are autobiographical. Two other chapters are a homage to film critic Kevin Thomas, and a comparison of two generations of film-makers. The rest of the chapters are essays about the following films:

- Bullitt
- Dirty Harry
- Deliverance
- The Getaway (1972)
- The Outfit
- Sisters
- Daisy Miller
- Taxi Driver (two chapters)
- Rolling Thunder
- Paradise Alley
- Escape from Alcatraz
- Hardcore
- The Funhouse

== Publication ==
The book was initially scheduled to be published on October 25, 2022; Cinema Speculation was published by Harper on November 1, 2022. It is the second book in a two-book deal Tarantino signed with HarperCollins in 2020. Tarantino promoted the book with a nationwide book tour. The book's cover features a photograph of Steve McQueen with director Sam Peckinpah on the set of the 1972 action crime thriller The Getaway.

== Reception ==
Cinema Speculation debuted at number five on The New York Times nonfiction best-seller list for the week ending November 5, 2022. Kirkus Reviews gave the book a starred review, writing, "Whether you agree with his assessments or not, he provides the original reporting and insights only a veteran director would notice, and his engaging style makes it impossible to leave an essay without learning something." The Daily Telegraph reviewer Jasper Rees gave the book 3 out of 5 stars, writing, "At times it's like leafing through yellowing back issues of Screen International. At others you feel Tarantino would have made a brilliant Tinseltown gossip columnist."

== See also ==
- New Hollywood
- Exploitation film
- American independent cinema
- Cinephilia
- A Personal Journey with Martin Scorsese Through American Movies - 1995 documentary film similar in content
