= Mel Martin =

English actress (born 1947)

- Born: 7 March 1947 (age 79); London, England
- Occupation: Actress
- Notable work: Only Fools and Horses (1993)
- Spouses: Paul Ridley (m. 1980–1982); John Duttine (m. 1998)

Mel Martin (born 7 March 1947) is an English actress.

== Early life ==
Her father was the artist Frank Vernon Martin, who died in 2005.

== Career ==
Her breakthrough role was as the star of LWT's Love For Lydia (1977), adapted from the novel by H E Bates. She has appeared in British television programmes beginning with Special Branch (1969) in which she played Barbara Cartwright, Mystery and Imagination: Sweeney Todd (1970), then New Scotland Yard, The Pallisers, Love For Lydia, Bergerac, Minder, Cover Her Face, Lovejoy, Cadfael, When the Boat Comes In, Inspector Morse and The Men's Room (1991), as well as films such as Quincy's Quest (1979), Business As Usual (1987), White Hunter Black Heart (1990), and Tom's Midnight Garden (1999).

She starred as Fiona Samson, the double agent and wife of Bernard Samson (played by Ian Holm) in the television adaptation of Len Deighton's trilogy Berlin Game, Mexico Set and London Match (broadcast as Game, Set and Match). She portrayed Vivien Leigh opposite Anthony Higgins as Laurence Olivier in the TV biopic Darlings of the Gods. In 2004, she portrayed Dorothy Huber in "They Understand Me in Paris", an episode of Rosemary and Thyme; Dorothy was the wife of millionaire Casper Hubert. She played Lady Dant in Mrs 'Arris Goes to Paris (1992). In 1997 she played Dawn Langley in "Daughter of the Regiment", Hetty Wainthropp Investigates (S3:E2). She has also appeared in the 1993 Christmas Special episode of Only Fools and Horses "Fatal Extraction" as Delboy's love interest Beverley.

== Personal life ==
Martin was married to Paul Ridley from 1980 to 1982. Her second marriage is to actor John Duttine, whom she met while filming the TV adaptation of Ruth Rendell's Talking to Strange Men. Martin and Duttine have appeared together on screen several times. In the Casualty episode "Branded" from February 1995, she played Mrs Jackson, whose transvestite former husband was played by Duttine. In the Heartbeat episode entitled "Troubled Waters", broadcast on 22 July 2007, Martin made a guest appearance in the series but never appeared in the same scenes as Duttine who was playing his regular role of Sergeant George Miller. She played Emily Merryweather, a widow who took a big shine to local garage owner Bernie Scripps played by Peter Benson. In April 2002, they played the prosecution and defence barristers at Little Mo's trial for the attempted murder of her husband Trevor in EastEnders.
