= Len Deighton's London Dossier =

1967 guide book to London

- First edition hardcover
- Author: Len Deighton
- Cover artist: Raymond Hawkey
- Language: English
- Genre: Guide book
- Publisher: Jonathan Cape & Penguin
- Publication date: 1967 (UK)
- Publication place: United Kingdom
- Media type: Print (hardcover & paperback)
- Pages: 352 pp

Len Deighton's London Dossier is a guide book to London, edited by British author Len Deighton and published in 1967. It consists of a "collection of personal guides to the hidden gems and sites of London by a range of writers and raconteurs, many of them Len Deighton’s friends." Deighton himself contributes two of the 14 essays.

Among the contributors are the Sunday Times columnist and editor Godfrey Smith, musician and TV presenter Steve Race, the Evening Standard critic and columnist Milton Shulman, photographer and journalist Daniel Farson, photographer Adrian Flowers, investigative reporter and crime writer Eric Clark, and photographer, journalist and foodie Adrian Bailey.

The book is "styled as a 'dossier' to capitalise in part on Deighton's growing reputation at the time as a spy thriller writer, and also cashes in on his growing reputation as one of sixties London's 'names' and all-purpose man about town.The book will tell you where to hire a barrel organ; where to buy snake steaks; where to find the nearest nudist colony; and how to handle taxi drivers. It's eclectic in the extreme, but a fantastic read where the mini skirts, cigarette smoke and smell of jellied eels leaps off the page."
