= Mexico Set =

1984 novel by Len Deighton

- First edition (Hutchinson)
- Author: Len Deighton
- Language: English
- Genre: Espionage novel
- Publisher: Hutchinson (UK); Knopf (US)
- Publication date: 1984 (UK)
- Publication place: United Kingdom
- Media type: Print (Hardcover)
- Preceded by: Berlin Game
- Followed by: London Match

Mexico Set is a 1984 spy novel by Len Deighton. It is the second novel in the first of three trilogies about Bernard Samson, a middle-aged and somewhat jaded intelligence officer working for the British Secret Intelligence Service (MI6). Mexico Set is part of the Game, Set and Match trilogy, being preceded by Berlin Game and followed by London Match. This trilogy is followed by the Hook, Line and Sinker trilogy and the final Faith, Hope and Charity trilogy. Deighton's novel Winter (1987) is a prequel to the nine novels, covering the years 1900-1945 and providing the backstory to some of the characters.

Mexico Set continues the story that began with Berlin Game, where Bernard Samson's wife Fiona was unmasked as a KGB double agent.

== Plot summary ==
The story begins in Mexico, where Samson is on the trail of his Soviet opposite number: Erich Stinnes, a KGB major working in East Germany whom London Central wishes to coax over to the West.

The task of laying the delicate and elaborate groundwork for Stinnes' defection propels Samson from Mexico to London, Paris, Berlin, and the East-West border. What happens along the way—a temporary abduction, an unnecessary murder, an inconvenient suicide—happens so fast that Samson hardly seems able to keep London Central informed of developments. Or is it that Samson wants to keep his colleagues in the dark? Certainly London Central's entire senior staff—from Samson's immediate supervisors, locked in their endless internecine office warfare, to the dotty Director-General himself—would have reason to suspect that Samson might be working for the other side. He was, after all, closer than any of the other to the former traitor-in-their-midst.

Samson himself is losing control—events seem to be controlling him. As he finds himself in a series of ever more incriminating positions, as one by one the avenues of escape or vindication close before him, the novel winds back towards Mexico and toward the climax - at the scene of the defection Samson has so painstakingly orchestrated—in which the allegiances of all involved are finally and fatefully revealed.

== Adaptations ==
Years after its publication, Granada TV made a version of the trilogy for ITV, consisting of twelve 60 minute episodes, called Game, Set and Match, starring Ian Holm as Bernard Samson and Mel Martin as Fiona. It was adapted by John Howlett and directed by Ken Grieve and Patrick Lau.
