= Eric Clark (author) =

British writer and investigative journalist (1937–2018)

- Born: 29 July 1937; Moseley, United Kingdom
- Died: 22 October 2018 (aged 81)
- Occupations: Investigative journalist, Fiction author
- Spouse: Marcelle Bernstein
- Website: ericclark.net

Eric Clark (29 July 1937 – 22 October 2018) was a British author and investigative journalist. Clark is best known for his book The Real Toy Story, which examines the world toy market and the battle companies have to win over consumers. During his career, he wrote several books in both the fiction and non-fiction sectors that have been published in more than 20 countries (LINK). His works included thrillers, documentaries, magazine, and newspaper articles.

In the 1960s, Clark wrote a series of articles that appeared in The Observer, focusing on the American Mafia's infiltration of London's casinos. These articles were credited for the changes that were made to the UK's gambling laws. One of Clark's espionage novels, The Sleeper, was described by Kirkus Reviews as "mind-lingering entertainment that boosts Clark high up in the stark, lean, British-suspense echelons."

== Life and Family ==
Clark was born in Moseley, Birmingham, to Horace and Hilda (née Mitchley) and grew up in Erdington in the city. After studying at Handsworth Grammar School, Clark flew to Spain with the desire to be the next Hemingway. He had the ambition to write from a young age and wrote his first (unpublished) novel before his 17th birthday. He then started his career in journalism.

In 1958, Clark married Frances Grant; the couple later divorced. In 1972, Clark married Marcelle Bernstein. Together they had three children, Rachael, Charlotte and Daniel. He also has 4 grandchildren, Madeleine, Cecilia, Tabitha and Iris. Together, Clark and Bernstein decided to become freelance writers, and earned their living as self-employed authors. Clark's style of writing was that of unadorned and spare prose, while his wife preferred to use more adjectives and write in a "flowery" manner.

In 1974, he received a prospective commission from politician Enoch Powell who asked Clark to write a biography for him in exchange for access to his papers. At their meeting in Powell's London flat, Powell expressed his surprise that Clark had married someone of Jewish heritage, and Clark rejected the offer. He later expressed his belief the intended purpose of the proposed biography was to promote Powell should Britain require a leader in the context of a breakdown of civil order.

Clark was a member of the Society of Authors (SoA) for more than 30 years and in the later years became part of their management committee. He was also a fellow of English PEN, a member of the National Union of Journalists, the Authors Guild, the Mystery Writers Association, and the International Thriller Writers organisation.

At the age of 81, Clark died on 22 October 2018.

== Career ==
=== Non-Fiction ===
Clark started working for local papers, including the Erdington News and the Birmingham Post, before moving to The Daily Mail. In 1958, he joined The Guardian, where he wrote authoritative backgrounders to major events of the time, such as the Great Train Robbery. From 1964 to 1972, Clark worked for The Observer, where he served as Home Affairs Editor and head of the Investigative Unit. Here, his exposure of London's casinos "led the Home Secretary, Roy Jenkins, to introduce swingeing new controls that cleaned up the British gambling scene and sent many American 'businessmen' scurrying home."

In 1967, Clark contributed a chapter 'Underworld' to Len Deighton's London Dossier published by Jonathan Cape and Penguin. The book's cover described it as "an alternative new way of taking the city apart".

In 1969, Clark's first book was Everybody's Guide to Survival: A Handbook on Danger - How to Prevent It or Live through It. His solution to the problem of escaping from a submerged car led to a 1968 television appearance on ATV's Tonight with Dave Allen. "A tank was rigged up in the studio car park: the about-to-be-submerged pair discovered to their horror that the car, an old banger, leaked like a sieve. 'If things go wrong we'll smash the tank,' the director assured them. 'Do that and you'll kill us both,' said Eric. He and Allen were nevertheless lowered in – and survived."

In 1973, Clark wrote Corps Diplomatique, later published in the US as Diplomat. The book showed how "the old school of diplomacy is dying. Modern communications have diminished the diplomat's autonomy... the U.S. State Department has recently demonstrated some iconoclastic feminism, and egalitarian recruiting has undercut the aura of aristocracy... Clark occasionally chides the vestigial formalities such as calling cards...suggesting that, after all, diplomats are nothing more than 'glorified journalists.' His portrayal of espionage, propaganda, and posts behind the Iron Curtain and at the U.N. is dispassionate and objective."

In 1988, Clark released The Want Makers, a look at the rise of advertising, revealing how deeply the industry has come to affect every area of life. This was another international investigation, based on firms in London, Tokyo, and New York. In the book, Clark describes "in exhaustive detail an industry that targets as captive customers children, who spend more time watching TV than in school and can zero in on consumer 'grazers' 18–30 years old, who eat lightly and often and buy more of everything than anyone else. He shows us tobacco and liquor advertisers who subtly evade regulation, giant pharmaceutical companies with identical therapies that push their own brand names on doctors through gifts, entertainment and a barrage of trade ads, and political TV spots that overwhelm democracy in national elections."

In 2007, The Real Toy Story was published. Clark contrasted the ruthless pragmatism of the international toy industry with the cozy lovable image of the products it sells. He interviewed 200 industry insiders, from lone inventors to heads of multinational companies, and also investigated the Chinese sweatshops, where 80% of the world's toys are made:

'This is where toys are produced for a few cents each by vast numbers of young migrants toiling in sweatshop conditions. This is the hidden face of the toy industry, without which it could not exist. The Pearl River Delta, China. The workshop of the world. Behind high fences, sprawling factory compounds stretch mile after dusty, depressing mile along the congested roads. Guarded gates control entry and exit. Adjoining many of the blocks are identical concrete boxes – the washing at the chicken-wire-covered windows, adding flashes of colour, is the only indication that these are the dormitories. Between shifts, the workers, mostly young women, their faces set in exhaustion, shuffle from building to building. Shifts can last more than 15 hours a day, seven days a week...'

=== Fiction ===
Between 1977 and 1985, Clark wrote five espionage novels. The first, Black Gambit, influenced by John le Carré, concerns a plan to rescue a Soviet dissident under house arrest by substituting a double for him. Kirkus Reviews described the book as 'revamped escape-from-behind-the-Iron-Curtain... (with) the quiet, cumulative force and the clean, cinematic through-line that more convoluted spy-thrillers miss out on.'

Clark's second novel, The Sleeper, which was published in 1980, was judged by Kirkus to be his most successful: "Clark's quietly impressive spy debut, Black Gambit (1977), had everything but original twists—and now he has those too, in a swift, cleanly knotted festival of ironies... Dark-edged characters, shards of raw action, implicit moral dilemmas left and right, plus a last-page punchline guaranteed to elicit a gasp or groan."

With Send in the Lions, in 1981, Clark set the story of a plane hijack in the near future: "It's 1985, and a terrorist band (including cool-killer Karen, a Dutch diplomat's daughter) hijacks a Concorde jet carrying, among others, a US movie queen, the Soviet deputy foreign minister, the son of billionaire Andrew Muntwick... and an ugly little nobody named Ross whom Karen loathes on sight. And when the plane is forced to land in Algeria, the terrorists and these prime hostages disappear...How will the governments react?..." The reviewer found the book "more like a film scenario than a full-scale novel... swiftly readable but disappointingly sketchy."

Clark's last two novels, Chinese Burn (1984) and China Run (1985) were both set in China. According to Kirkus, Chinese Burn had "none of the grabs of Clark's best suspense (The Sleeper)--but readers may forgive the predictability... in order to enjoy the richly detailed, well-researched Chinese backgrounds."

== Publications ==
=== Non-Fiction ===
- Len Deighton's London Dossier (Chapter 10), 1967
- Everybody's Guide to Survival, 1969
- Corps Diplomatique, 1973
- Diplomat: The World of International Diplomacy, 1974
- The Want Makers: The world of advertising: how they make you buy, 1988
- The Real Toy Story: Inside the Ruthless Battle for America's Youngest Consumers, 2007

=== Fiction ===
- Black Gambit, Morrow, 1977
- The Sleeper, 1980
- Send in the Lions, Hodder and Stoughton, 1981
- Chinese Burn, Hodder and Stoughton, 1984
- China Run, Little Brown & Co, 1985
