= Goodbye, Mickey Mouse =

1982 novel by Len Deighton

- First Edition
- Author: Len Deighton
- Language: English
- Genre: Historical fiction
- Publisher: Knopf
- Publication date: 12 October 1982
- Publication place: United Kingdom
- Media type: Print (Hardcover & Paperback)
- Pages: 337

Goodbye, Mickey Mouse is a historical novel by Len Deighton published on 12 October 1982. Set in Britain in early 1944, it tells the story of the 220th Fighter Group of the US Eighth Air Force in the lead up to the Allied invasion of Europe. The Group is based at a fictional airfield in Norfolk named Steeple Thaxted.

== Synopsis ==
Each chapter is titled by the name of the main character it deals with. The central storyline revolves around a love affair between a new pilot, Captain James Farebrother, and an English girl, Victoria Cooper. Another major plot line follows Lieutenant Mickey Morse, nicknamed Mickey Mouse, who is racing to be the first American pilot to break Eddie Rickenbacker's record of 26 kills from World War I.

=== Critical reception ===
The New York Times review suggested that the novel successfully evoked wartime Britain, and featured Deighton's trademark technical and operational details of the P-51 Mustang fighter which the Group flies. It described the aerial scenes as few and brief but powerfully capturing the terror and excitement of bomber escort missions over Germany.

Simon Mcleish gave the book a mixed review. He stated that Goodbye Mickey Mouse is obviously "well researched," but the research "is presented less obtrusively". Mcleish also stating that "for the general reader, Goodbye Mickey Mouse" is not Deighton's most appealing novel, "though it would repay the effort required to read it."
