= John Howlett =

English author and screenwriter (1940–2019)

- Born: 4 April 1940; United Kingdom
- Died: 4 March 2019 (aged 78); United Kingdom
- Citizenship: United Kingdom
- Education: Jesus College, Oxford
- Occupations: Screenwriter, author
- Children: 2, Isabel, Suzanne
- Writing career
- Language: English
- Genres: Screenwriting, fiction
- Notable works: if...., Cry, Love Of An Unknown Soldier
- Website: johnhowlett.co.uk

John Howlett (4 April 1940 – 4 March 2019) was an English author and screenwriter who lived in Rye, East Sussex.

He started his writing career by co-writing the screenplay of the 1968 feature film if...., directed by Lindsay Anderson.

== Education ==
Howlett attended Tonbridge School and Jesus College, Oxford where he studied history.

== Screenwriting Credits ==
His writing credits cover film and TV and include both writing and adaptation.

- 1999 Doomwatch: Winter Angel (TV movie) (writer)
- 1999 Darkness Falls (writer)
- 1993 Colpo di coda (TV movie) (writer)
- 1992 Touch and Die (TV movie) (writer)
- 1992 Bonne chance Frenchie (TV mini-series) (adaptation)
- 1990 Where Were You That Night? (TV Movie)
- 1989 Crossing the Line (TV Series)
- 1988 Game, Set and Match (TV series)
- 1985 Murder of a Moderate Man (TV mini-series)
- 1968 Thirty-Minute Theatre (TV series)
- 1968 if.... (from an original story called "Crusaders" & script)

== Other work ==
He was also a researcher on the 1975 TV documentary James Dean: The First American Teenager. He is the author of the 1980 biography of Frank Sinatra, together with a biography of James Dean and a number of works of fiction.

His full book credits are:

Fiction

- The Christmas Spy (1975)
- Tango November (1976)
- Maximum Credible Accident (1980)
- Orange (1985)
- Murder of a Moderate Man (1985)
- Cry (1995)
- Love Of An Unknown Soldier (2010)
- A Long Road Home (2012)
- When War Came Again (2012)
- First Snow Of Winter (2012)

Non fiction

- James Dean (1975)
- Frank Sinatra (1979)

Theatre

- Dean - West End musical with Robert Campbell. Subsequently produced in Japan by the Takarazuka Revue
- Lorca - Musical with Theo Jaskolkowski & Robert Campbell

Radio - (BBC Radio 4)

- Soldier, Poor man, Beggarman, Thief
- Next Man Through the Door
- Gone for Soldiers
- Maximum Credible Accident
