= Germany Philatelic Society =

- Type: not-for-profit organization
- Location: Chesterfield, Missouri
- Region served: United States and Canada
- Key people: Rudi Anders, president
- Revenue: Membership fees
- Website: http://www.germanyphilatelicsocietyusa.org (Germany Philatelic Society USA)

The Germany Philatelic Society is dedicated to the documentation, preservation, advancement and promotion of the stamps and postal history of Germany and its related areas through education, study, research and services.

== GPS units ==
The society maintains chapters and study groups. Chapter may be formed by five or more members of the GPS after making application for admission and charter by the society. Study groups may be formed by ten or more members subject to the provisions of the by-laws.

=== Chapters ===
Chapters are located in various parts of the United States and Canada:

- Eastern USA chapters are located at Baltimore, Maryland; Buffalo, New York; New York City; Philadelphia, Pennsylvania.
- Southern USA chapters are located at: the Carolinas, Central Florida.
- Central USA locations are at: Chicago, Illinois; Columbus, Ohio; Milwaukee, Wisconsin; Minneapolis/St. Paul, Minnesota; Omaha, Nebraska; and St. Louis, Missouri.
- Western USA locations: Denver, Colorado; and Tucson, Arizona.

=== Study groups ===
GPS maintains study groups on the stamps and postal history of Buildings, German Colonies, Early Empire, GDR, HOPs (hand overprints), Inflation, Stadtpost, Color Studies and the Third Reich.

== Membership ==
Any person of good character interested in the postage stamps and postal history of Germany may join. The society headquarters is located at P.O. Box 6547 Chesterfield, Missouri.

A reduced membership fee schedule is available to all younger collectors, under the age of 21.

PayPal is accepted as of July 1, 2015.

== Publications ==
The Society's journal is The German Postal Specialist which is published and issued twelve times during the year (September through August). It also offers books and CD-ROMs on studies already completed.

== Services ==
The society offers a number of services, such as identification & translation services, the loan of items from its literature libraries, etc.

In 2014 the Society's entire Audio/Visual library was digitized and converted into DVD format. Single program or 3-4 multiple program are available for sale to all philatelic groups and individuals within the United States for nominal prices.

== Staff ==
The society maintains a staff consisting of: president, vice president, secretary/treasurer, a director of international affairs, an audio-visual librarian, literature librarian, publicity director and web master. The current president is Rudi Anders. The GPS is governed by its set of by-laws, dated August 2012 and revised in 2014.

== See also ==
- Philately
