= Eric Clark (footballer) =

Australian rules footballer

Personal information
- Full name: Eric Clark
- Born: 13 March 1916
- Died: 9 November 2008 (aged 92)
- Original team: Kew
- Height: 180 cm (5 ft 11 in)
- Weight: 73 kg (161 lb)

Playing career^{1}
Years	Club	Games (Goals)
1936–39	Fitzroy	34 (1)
1939	North Melbourne	2 (1)
Total		36 (2)
- ^{1} Playing statistics correct to the end of 1939.

Eric Clark (13 March 1916 – 9 November 2008) was an Australian rules footballer who played with Fitzroy and North Melbourne in the Victorian Football League (VFL).
