= Charity (novel) =

1996 novel by Len Deighton

- First edition cover (publ. HarperCollins)
- Author: Len Deighton
- Language: English
- Genre: Spy novel
- Publisher: Hutchinson
- Publication date: 1996 (UK)
- Publication place: United Kingdom
- Media type: Print (Hardcover)
- Preceded by: Hope

Charity is a 1996 spy novel by Len Deighton. It was the last fiction novel published during the author’s lifetime and the final book in the final trilogy about Bernard Samson, a middle-aged and somewhat jaded intelligence officer working for the British Secret Intelligence Service (MI6). Charity is part of the Faith, Hope and Charity trilogy, being preceded by Faith and Hope. This trilogy is preceded by the Game, Set and Match and the Hook, Line and Sinker trilogies. Deighton's novel Winter (1987) is a prequel to the nine novels, covering the years 1900–1945 and providing the backstory to some of the characters.

== Plot summary ==
Bernard is still working for Frank Harrington in Berlin where he hardly ever gets to see his wife and children whom he hardly knows any more. While crossing Poland Bernard is captured by Polish intelligence and is severely beaten for shooting their men while retrieving George Kosinski in Hope. Meanwhile, George is being interrogated in London but he has revealed no useful information and is now threatening to destroy Bernard and Fiona's careers. Bernard is using his position in Berlin to investigate Tessa's death which results in Silas Gaunt confessing to hiring Thurkettle to fake Fiona's death but he denies knowing anything about using Tessa and tells Bernard to back off.

Bernard has had enough, and contacts The Swede to organise to fly him, his children and hopefully Gloria out of the country to begin a new life. The Swede is drunk and erratic and tells Bernard that on the night of Tessa's death he was hired to fly Jay Prettyman from Berlin to London and was carrying a locked box that Prettyman would need. Prettyman never showed up but his ex-wife did and took the box.

Bernard tracks down the dying Prettyman who confesses that he hired Thurkettle but found him dead at the meeting place and drove back to West Berlin and that his ex-wife is now demanding money for the return of the box. Prettyman says the operations was all a waste of time anyway because the ruse never fooled the KGB. Bernard finds Thurkettle's hastily buried body and a gun Werner was asked to give Prettyman at the meeting place. Werner steals the box from Prettyman's ex-wife and in retaliation she shoots and wounds Werner at his grand house warming party.

The Swede is murdered by the Russians and Gloria tells Bernard that his plan to abduct his children was stupid and that they are best off where they are, in boarding school which provides them with much needed stability. Bernard realises there is no future for him and Gloria and that she is now seeing Bret.

Bret holds an inquiry in to Tessa's murder and announces Silas was solely responsible and no longer has any connection to the Department. The Department ordered Dicky to bring Tessa to Berlin. Silas blackmailed Prettyman into hiring Thurkettle to kill Tessa and then killing him. The box was a bomb designed to blow up The Swede's plane removing the last loose ends. Bernard suspected this but said nothing hoping to flush out who else was in on the plan but is forced to step in when he discovers Bret has ordered Frank's assistant to break into the box.

Bret tells Bernard that both he and the Department owe him and that he will do his best to try to give Frank's job, and a pension to Bernard when Frank retires. Bret tells Bernard he is being stupid and that Fiona really loves him and not her job. Bernard say he has asked Fiona to join him in Berlin and hopes that his children can go to school in Berlin just like he did.
