= Spy Sinker =

1990 spy novel by Len Deighton

- First edition cover (UK, Hutchinson); Cover artist Patrick McCreeth
- Author: Len Deighton
- Language: English
- Genre: Spy novel
- Publisher: Hutchinson
- Publication date: 1990 (UK)
- Publication place: United Kingdom
- Media type: Print (Hardcover)
- Preceded by: Spy Line
- Followed by: Faith

Spy Sinker is a 1990 spy novel by Len Deighton. It is the final novel in the second of three trilogies about Bernard Samson, a middle-aged and somewhat jaded intelligence officer working for the British Secret Intelligence Service (MI6). Spy Sinker is part of the Hook, Line and Sinker trilogy, being preceded by Spy Hook and Spy Line. This trilogy is preceded by the Game, Set and Match trilogy and followed by the final Faith, Hope and Charity trilogy. Deighton's novel Winter (1987) is a prequel to the nine novels, covering the years 1900-1945 and providing the backstory to some of the characters.

== Plot summary ==
Spy Sinker starts in 1977 and ends in 1987. It tells the entire story in the previous five novels from the third person perspective (Bernard Samson's bosses, his colleagues, his girlfriend Gloria, and most of all his wife Fiona). Thus it fills in the gaps in the story, as the previous five books only reveal what Bernard can see and think he understands. It also tells the back story leading up to the story in the five novels, which has only been hinted at previously.

== Reception ==
The novel received a mixed review from Kirkus Reviews. Publishers Weekly gave a negative review, writing the book was disappointing, passionless, and unsuspenseful.
