= Game, Set and Match =

- Soundtrack cover
- Genre: Drama
- Based on: Berlin Game, Mexico Set and London Match by Len Deighton
- Written by: John Howlett
- Directed by: Ken Grieve, Patrick Lau
- Starring: Ian Holm; Michael Culver; Michael Degen; Mel Martin; Gottfried John; Anthony Bate
- Theme music composer: Richard Harvey
- Country of origin: United Kingdom
- Original languages: English, German
- No. of series: 1
- No. of episodes: 13

Production
- Producer: Brian Armstrong
- Running time: 60 minutes
- Production company: Granada Television

Original release
- Network: ITV
- Release: 3 October – 19 December 1988

Game, Set and Match is a 1988 television serial directed by Ken Grieve and Patrick Lau and written by John Howlett. It is based on the books Berlin Game (1983), Mexico Set (1984), and London Match (1985) by Len Deighton. The two directors worked separately on different episodes. Filmed on location in Berlin and Mexico, the project included a large international cast with 3,000 extras and a budget of $8 million. While critically acclaimed, the ratings for the series were a disaster. Ian Holm was nominated for a BAFTA award for his portrayal of Bernard Samson.

It was aired in 1989 in the United States as part of the PBS show Mystery!

== Plot synopsis ==
The series focuses on Bernard Samson (Ian Holm), beginning with his search for the "mole" that threatens the Brahms Network in East Germany. Samson is sent to Berlin to bring out a Brahms agent. He is then sent to Mexico to try to persuade a KGB major (Gottfried John) to defect, using his childhood friend Werner Volkmann's wife Zena as bait. After it appears another traitor is working at London Central, Samson himself becomes one of the prime suspects.

== Cast ==
- Ian Holm as Bernard Samson
- Mel Martin as Fiona Samson
- Michael Culver as Dicky Cruyer
- Michael Degen as Werner Volkmann
- Gottfried John as Eric Stinnes
- Anthony Bate as Bret Renssalaer
- Frederick Treves as Frank Harrington
- Amanda Donohoe as Gloria Kent
- Hugh Fraser as Giles Trent
- Gail Harrison as Tessa Kozinski
- Gary Whelan as George Kozinski
- Brigitte Karner as Zena Volkmann
- Alan MacNaughtan as Sir Henry Clevemore DG
- Michael Aldridge as Silas Gaunt
- Peter Vaughan as David Kimber-Hutchinson
- Eva Ebner as Frau Lisl Hennig
- Jeremy Child as Henry Tiptree
- Doran Godwin as Daphne Cruyer

== Episodes ==
No.	Title	Directed by	Written by	Original release date	Length
1 2	"Berlin Game: Parts 1 & 2"	Ken Grieve	John Howlett	3 October 1988 (UK); March 23, 1989 (PBS, U.S. airing)	120 min.
Bernard Samson, once a field agent for British MI6 based in West Berlin, is now working at a desk. A flashback relates how Samson attempted to run an aging Polish agent in Gdańsk. The agent's son is an officer in the Polish army and Samson is to make contact and try to "turn" him. The attempt proves to be a set-up and fails. A leak from within London Central has been discovered in the German arm of the British SIS. The leak causes concern among the higher levels of the SIS in regard to their East German "Brahms Network", especially their most valuable agent, "Brahms Four".
3	"Berlin Game: Part 3"	Patrick Lau	John Howlett	10 October 1988(UK); March 30, 1989 (PBS, U.S. airing)	TBA
Samson has been sent back to Berlin. He meets with station chief Frank Harrington, then tracks down his childhood friend and former agent Werner Volkmann's wife Zena, who has become Harrington's mistress. Werner is suspected of being the leak, while Samson has suspicions it is Giles Trent of the Foreign Office. He also suspects his wife, Fiona—who is security chief at London Central—is having an affair with his superior Bret Rensselaer.
4	"Berlin Game: Part 4"	Patrick Lau	John Howlett	17 October 1988; April 6, 1989 (PBS, U.S. airing)	TBA
Giles Trent has attempted suicide after being confronted as a Russian spy. After agreeing to become a double agent, Trent is murdered by a member of the Brahms Network who believes Trent to be the leak. Samson does not believe Trent was responsible for the leak and was planted by the Russians to divert attention from the real mole. Samson is sent back over the Berlin Wall to contact Brahms Four who wishes to be extracted from East Germany.
5	"Berlin Game: Part 5"	Ken Grieve	John Howlett	24 October 1988 (UK); April 13, 1989 (PBS, U.S. airing)	TBA
Bernard and Werner successfully extract Brahms Four from the East. Samson discovers the identity of the mole.
6	"Mexico Set: Part 1"	Ken Grieve	John Howlett	31 October 1988(UK); April 20, 1989 (PBS, U.S. airing)	TBA
Werner and Zena notify Bernard they have spotted Erich Stinnes, a KGB major who was responsible for Bernard's capture in East Berlin, in Mexico City. Bernard and Dickie Cruyer travel to Mexico to attempt Stinnes' defection to the West.
7	"Mexico Set: Part 2"	Patrick Lau	John Howlett	7 November 1988(UK); April 27, 1989 (PBS, U.S. airing)	TBA
Using Zena as bait, Bernard has contacted Stinnes and continues attempting to convince him to defect. Samson is suspicious that Stinnes is playing a double game.
8	"Mexico Set: Part 3"	Ken Grieve	John Howlett	14 November 1988(UK); May 4, 1989 (PBS, U.S. airing)	TBA
The attempt to turn Stinnes continues with Zena attempting to run the operation for her own gain. Bernard is frustrated with the double dealing of Zena as well as his superiors.
9	"Mexico Set: Part 4"	Patrick Lau	John Howlett	21 November 1988(UK); May 11, 1989 (PBS, U.S. airing)	TBA
Still tracking Stinnes, Bernard himself comes under suspicion that he is a double agent.
10	"Mexico Set: Part 5"	Ken Grieve	John Howlett	28 November 1988(UK); May 18, 1989 (PBS, U.S. airing)	TBA
The defection of Stinnes is completed, although with disastrous consequences. Stinnes is taken to England to be debriefed.
11	"London Match: Part 1"	Ken Grieve	John Howlett	5 December 1988 (UK); May 25, 1989 (PBS, U.S. airing)	TBA
Based on information gained from Stinnes, Bernard locates a British woman working as a Russian courier. Her interrogation leads to suspicions that there is an additional mole in London Central.
12	"London Match: Part 2"	Patrick Lau	John Howlett	12 December 1988 (UK); June 1, 1989 (PBS, U.S. airing)	TBA
Stinnes continues to be debriefed and information points to Bret Rensselaer.
13	"London Match: Part 3"	Ken Grieve	John Howlett	19 December 1988 (UK); June 8, 1989 (PBS, U.S. airing)	TBA
Rensselaer is further incriminated and turns to Bernard to help clear him. Werner is captured in East Germany and an arrangement is made to make a prisoner exchange for him.

== Reception ==
Clifford Terry, writing for the Chicago Tribune, called the series "a crackling cloak-and-dagger thriller". He noted that "the sharp direction by Kenneth Grieve and Patrick Lau and the provocative script by Howlett... comes up a winner through an assemblage of superb performances." In TV Week, a supplement to The Philadelphia Inquirer, Lee Winfrey praised the production, calling it a "mind-bender", and singling out Gottfried John as a "mesmerizing menace", and cited Holm as "[holding] things together." Conversely, in his review for The New York Times, John O'Connor wrote "Costly and ambitious, the 13-hour production of Game, Set and Match... is a mess." He cited Ian Holm as being miscast.

== Soundtrack ==
Game, Set and Match

Soundtrack album by Richard Harvey
- Released: 1988
- Genre: Television score
- Label: Chrysalis
- Producer: Richard Harvey

The soundtrack by Richard Harvey for Game, Set and Match was released on LP in 1988. Some of the music ("Game, Set and Match", "Goodbye Codes" and "The Cloisters of San Jacinto") was reissued in 2016 on Shroud for a Nightingale: The Television Drama Music of Richard Harvey. "The Bridge" and "The End Game" are available on Shroud for a Nightingale: The Screen Music of Richard Harvey.

=== Track list ===
All songs by Richard Harvey.

1. "Game, Set and Match"
2. "Wrong Side of Charlie"
3. "Tante Lisl - The Wings of Remembrance"
4. "Unter Den Linden"
5. "Goodbye Codes"
6. "Coming Home"
7. "The Bridge"
8. "Tianguis"
9. "Domingo's Path"
10. "Snakes & Ladders"
11. "The Cloisters of San Jacinto"
12. "The Hurricane Season"
13. "A Christmas Spy"
14. "A Rough Crossing"
15. "The Oxford Joker"
16. " Pulling Strings"
17. "The End Game"
