= London Match =

1985 spy novel by Len Deighton

- First edition cover
- Author: Len Deighton
- Language: English
- Genre: Spy novel
- Publisher: Hutchinson
- Publication date: 1985 (UK)
- Publication place: United Kingdom
- Media type: Print (Hardcover)
- Pages: 405 pp
- ISBN: 978-0-09-161890-2
- OCLC: 12502667
- Preceded by: Mexico Set
- Followed by: Spy Hook

London Match is a 1985 spy novel by Len Deighton, concluding the first of three trilogies about Bernard Samson, a middle-aged and somewhat jaded intelligence officer working for the British Secret Intelligence Service (MI6). London Match is part of the Game, Set and Match trilogy, being preceded by Berlin Game and Mexico Set. This trilogy is followed by the Hook, Line and Sinker trilogy and the final Faith, Hope and Charity trilogy. Deighton's novel Winter (1987) is a prequel to the nine novels, covering the years 1900-1945 and providing the backstory to some of the characters.

London Match concludes the story that began with Berlin Game, where Bernard Samson's wife Fiona was unmasked as a KGB double agent and was forced into defecting, and that was continued in Mexico Set, where Bernard Samson assisted the defection of Erich Stinnes, his KGB opposite number.

== Plot summary ==
Samson suspects that there is a traitor within his department of MI6, due to the appearance of a memorandum which was leaked to the KGB. It transpires that it is part of a plot conducted by his wife—now working for East German intelligence—to frame his superior, Bret Rensselaer, as a KGB agent. When Samson's old friend Werner Volkmann is arrested by the East German police Samson organizes an unauthorised exchange of defector Erich Stinnes for him, but the operation ends in a shoot-out on the Berlin U-Bahn.

== Adaptations ==
Bernard Samson was played by Ian Holm and Fiona Samson by Mel Martin in a 1988 Granada Television adaptation of the first trilogy, entitled Game, Set and Match, transmitted as twelve 60 minute episodes. Filmed on location in Berlin and Mexico, the project included a large international cast with 3,000 extras and a budget of $8 million. While critically acclaimed, the ratings for the series were a disaster. It was adapted by John Howlett and directed by Ken Grieve and Patrick Lau.
