= Winter (Deighton novel) =

1987 novel by Len Deighton

Winter: A novel of a Berlin family
- First edition (UK)
- Author: Len Deighton
- Language: English
- Subject: Second World War, Nuremberg trials
- Genre: Historical fiction
- Published: Hutchinson (UK)
- Media type: Book
- Pages: 571
- ISBN: 0-09-170960-1
- OCLC: 16470341

Winter is a 1987 novel by Len Deighton, which follows the lives of a German family from 1899 to 1945. At the same time the novel provides a historical background to several of the characters in Deighton's nine novels about the British intelligence agent Bernard Samson, who grew up in the ruins of Berlin after the Second World War.

== Plot summary ==
The narrative starts on the eve of the year 1900 with Harald Winter, a German businessman with two sons, Peter and Paul, two very different brothers, whose lives are inextricably linked with Germany in the years leading up to the Second World War. One a scholar and one a romantic, their lives diverge, leading one into the inner mechanisms of the Nazi Party and one into exile in America, the birthplace of their mother.

From their sheltered childhood through their violent coming of age in the Great War, from the chaos of 1920s Berlin to the spreading power of Hitler they are wrenched apart by conflicting ideals and ambitions. Their story is further complicated by their father's long standing affair with a Hungarian woman, eventually revealed to be Jewish; their love for him is overshadowed by their loathing of his behaviour.

Since the entire story unfolds as a flashback from the time of the Nuremberg War Crimes Trials after the Nazis' defeat, the readers know that both would make a career as lawyers, but in widely divergent directions: one would enter the Nazi Party and think up various "legal" ways to legitimise their crimes, while the other brother would be a staunch anti-Nazi, go into exile and come back to Germany after the war as a member of the American war crimes prosecution. But the reader cannot be sure, until deep in the book's plot, which is which.

== Context ==
For readers of Len Deighton's three trilogies about the MI6 operative Bernard Samson (Berlin Game, Mexico Set and London Match; Spy Hook, Spy Line, and Spy Sinker; and Faith, Hope and Charity), this is the story that started it all. The novel provides the historical background to several of the characters in the nine novels. It does this by introducing the reader to a minor character at least in this novel – who is a British intelligence agent, a character which recurs in different guises throughout the novel, including, for a brief period in the 1920s. This character, we learn, is Brian Samson, Bernard's father.

It is also made clear that Brian Samson loathed the Nazis; his conflicted relationship with Germany is a recurring theme through the Bernard Samson novels. A further contrast is supplied through the use of Brian's social displacement as a working class man operating in the rarified atmosphere of the world of pre-war and wartime espionage. This is echoed in Bernard, who makes frequent reflections about his lack of University education in comparison to both his peers and his wife.

The book contains an atmospheric description of a Zeppelin raid on London.

== Reception ==
Winter received favourable reviews, with critics describing it as "a masterful portrayal of the German Zeitgeist of almost half a century" and that it "makes comprehensible the awful appeal of Nazism to people of different persuasions".
