= Spy Hook =

1988 novel by Len Deighton

- First edition cover (UK, Hutchinson); Cover artist Hargrave Hands
- Author: Len Deighton
- Language: English
- Genre: Spy novel
- Publisher: Hutchinson
- Publication date: 1988 (UK)
- Publication place: United Kingdom
- Media type: Print (Hardcover)
- Followed by: Spy Line

Spy Hook is a 1988 spy novel by Len Deighton. It is the first novel in the second of three trilogies about Bernard Samson, a middle-aged and somewhat jaded intelligence officer working for the British Secret Intelligence Service (MI6). Spy Hook is part of the Hook, Line and Sinker trilogy, being succeeded by Spy Line and Spy Sinker. This trilogy is preceded by the Game, Set and Match trilogy and followed by the final Faith, Hope and Charity trilogy. Deighton's novel Winter (1987) is a prequel to the nine novels, covering the years 1900-1945 and providing the backstory to some of the characters.

== Plot summary ==
The novel begins with Bernard Samson visiting his old friend and ex-SIS colleague in Washington named Jim Prettyman as part of an investigation regarding a substantial amount of missing agency funds. Samson tells Prettyman that London wants him to return to the UK to give evidence about the missing funds, but Prettyman refuses. Soon after, Prettyman is shot six times in an apparent mugging.

All his allies start losing interest in the investigation, and after digging deeper Bernard is sent to America once again. In California, he meets Bret Rensselaer, who Samson believed had died after a shootout. In fact, Rensselaer has not died (as hinted at the end of the first trilogy, and discussed in this book) but is in fact in rehabilitation. Bernard returns to Europe, where he confronts a man called "Dodo" and is saved from an untimely death by Prettyman, who it turns out has had his death faked and gone under "deep-cover".

Bernard then takes his evidence to the elderly Director General, who in a surprise turn of events orders his arrest, which thanks to some quick thinking by Bernard's pal Werner Volkmann, who claims to be Samson, Bernard evades the Military Police for a while. Bernard's escape from the Military Police buys him time to seek an explanation from the Berlin Station Chief, Frank Harrington, before disappearing into the night.

== Reception ==
Publishers Weekly gave a positive review, writing that "Deighton mesmerizes the reader...The suspense is inexorable." Kirkus Reviews likewise gave a positive review, writing "Deighton's fans will be delighted to slip back into Bernie's complex world, so brightly human and artfully shadowed. Another Deighton triumph and likely best-seller."
