= Spy Line =

1989 spy novel written by Len Deighton

- First edition cover (UK, Hutchinson)
- Author: Len Deighton
- Language: English
- Genre: Spy novel
- Publisher: Hutchinson
- Publication date: 1989 (UK)
- Publication place: United Kingdom
- Media type: Print (Hardcover)
- Preceded by: Spy Hook
- Followed by: Spy Sinker

Spy Line is a 1989 spy novel written by British writer Len Deighton. It is the second novel in the second of three trilogies about Bernard Samson, a middle-aged and somewhat jaded intelligence officer working for the British Secret Intelligence Service (MI6). Spy Line is part of the Hook, Line and Sinker trilogy, being preceded by Spy Hook and followed Spy Sinker. This trilogy is preceded by the Game, Set and Match trilogy and followed by the final Faith, Hope and Charity trilogy. Deighton's novel Winter (1987) is a prequel to the nine novels, covering the years 1900-1945 and providing the backstory to some of the characters.

== Plot summary ==
The novel starts with Bernard Samson in hiding in Berlin after the events in the first book of the series. He is soon found by the SIS and is invited by Frank Harrington to sit in on a debriefing of an undercover agent, where it is revealed that Erich Stinnes has been smuggling drugs into East Germany.

Bernard is eventually recalled to London, and sent on a mission to Vienna to pick up a package from a stamp auction. This is revealed to be a Russian passport, which he uses to meet his wife Fiona, whom it is now revealed is a double agent (It is not made clear for how long Bernard knew this).

Finally, Fiona attempts to escape from East Germany, whereupon Erich Stinnes, and Fiona's sister Tessa are both killed. Bernard and Fiona escape back to the other side of the wall and are transported to America for debriefing.
