= Berlin Game =

1983 spy novel by Len Deighton

- First edition (UK)
- Author: Len Deighton
- Language: English
- Genre: Espionage novel
- Publisher: Hutchinson (UK); Knopf (US)
- Publication date: 1983 (UK)
- Publication place: United Kingdom
- Media type: Print (Hardcover)
- Pages: 301 pp
- ISBN: 0-09-154190-5
- OCLC: 10125712
- Followed by: Mexico Set

Berlin Game is a 1983 spy novel by Len Deighton. It is the first novel in the first of three trilogies about Bernard Samson, a middle-aged intelligence officer working for the British Secret Intelligence Service (MI6). Berlin Game is part of the Game, Set and Match trilogy, being succeeded by Mexico Set and London Match, and followed by the Hook, Line and Sinker trilogy and the final Faith, Hope and Charity trilogy. Deighton's novel Winter (1987) is a prequel to the nine novels, covering the years 1900 to 1945 and providing the backstory to some of the characters.

== Plot summary ==
The book is set in the early 1980s, following a highly placed agent in East Germany codenamed "Brahms Four" (one of Britain's agents behind the Iron Curtain), who demands that he is urgently granted safe passage to the West. This request sends a ripple of panic through the SIS, and Bernard Samson (a former field agent now working behind a London desk) is tasked with assisting in the escape. It is revealed that Brahms Four had saved Samson’s life nearly twenty years earlier.

Early on, Samson is confronted with undeniable evidence that there is a traitor among his colleagues working for the KGB. A number of suspects are presented: Dicky Cruyer, his incompetent supervisor (whom Samson despises); Bret Rensselaer, an American who has built his entire career around the work of Brahms Four, and who had been spending an inordinate amount of time with Samson's wife, Fiona (also an intelligence officer); Frank Harrington, the 'rezident' (head) of the Berlin field unit; or any member of the senior staff at London Central, including the Director-General himself.

Samson then travels to East Berlin to assist in the escape of Brahms Four and decides to send Brahms Four out in his place. His suspicions of treachery prove well-founded when he is captured and subsequently confronted by one of the suspects, who had defected and betrayed the operation.

== Adaptations ==
Bernard Samson was played by Ian Holm and Fiona Samson by Mel Martin in a 1988 Granada Television adaptation of the Game, Set and Match trilogy, entitled Game, Set and Match, transmitted as twelve 60 minute episodes. Filmed on location in Berlin and Mexico, the project included a large international cast with 3,000 extras and a budget of $8 million. While critically acclaimed, the ratings for the series were a disaster. It was adapted by John Howlett and directed by Ken Grieve and Patrick Lau. It has not been officially released on VHS or DVD.

== Other ==
In the preface to the reprint edition, Deighton notes that the novel is told in the highly subjective voice of the character of Bernard Samson, an unreliable narrator "who is inclined to complain and exaggerate so that we have to interpret the world around him". The author adds that "Readers who take Bernard’s words are missing a lot of the intended content".

In the prequel to the trilogy, Winter (1987), Deighton reminded his readers that the views of the characters were not necessarily those of the writer. The book's epigraph is a quote from James Jones: "readers should remember that the opinions expressed by the characters are not necessarily those of the author".

== In Other Media ==
In the Cold War film Target, Gene Hackman's character is seen reading this novel. Robert Forster's character also reads the novel in Quentin Tarantino's film Jackie Brown; Tarantino had at one point expressed interest in adapting the Game, Set, Match trilogy into a film.

== Additional listing ==
- Ich bin ein Berliner
