= Muzzy =

Muzzy may refer to:

== People ==
- Muzzy Izzet (born 1974), Turkish-English former footballer
- Muzzy Marcellino (1912–1997), American singer and musician
- Rob Muzzy, American motorcycle racing team manager
- Muzz, a British DJ and musical artist (formerly Muzzy)
- Washington Muzzy (1828-1898), American farmer and politician

== In fiction ==
- Muzzy is a large furry alien who appears in the BBC educational films Muzzy in Gondoland, Muzzy Vocabulary Builder and Muzzy Comes Back

== Places ==
=== United States ===
- Mount Jefferson (Massachusetts), also known as Muzzy Hill
- Muzzy Field, stadium in Bristol, Connecticut
