= Horror Hospital =

1973 British film by Antony Balch

- Theatrical release poster
- Directed by: Antony Balch
- Written by: Antony Balch; Alan Watson
- Produced by: Richard Gordon
- Starring: Robin Askwith; Michael Gough
- Cinematography: David McDonald
- Edited by: Robert Dearberg
- Music by: De Wolfe
- Production company: Noteworthy Films
- Distributed by: Antony Balch
- Release date: 1973 (UK)
- Running time: 90 mins
- Country: United Kingdom
- Language: English

Horror Hospital (also known as Computer Killers) is a 1973 British science-fiction comedy-horror film directed by Antony Balch and starring Robin Askwith, Michael Gough, Dennis Price and Skip Martin. It was written by Balch and Alan Watson.

A failed songwriter decides to take a vacation at a health farm. His hosts actually want to lobotomize him, in order to turn him into an obedient zombie slave.

== Plot ==
When attempts to break into the pop business leave him with nothing but a bloody nose, songwriter Jason Jones decides to take a break with 'Hairy Holidays', an outfit run by shifty, gay travel agent Pollack. After failing to chat Jason up, Pollack sends him to pseudo-health farm Brittlehurst Manor.

On the train journey there, Jason meets Judy who is travelling to the same destination to meet her long-lost aunt. Both are unaware that the health farm (i.e. "Horror Hospital") is a front for Dr. Storm and his lobotomy experiments that turn wayward hippies into his mindless zombie slaves.

The wheelchair-using doctor surrounds himself with an entourage that includes Judy's aunt, erstwhile brothel madam Olga, dwarf Frederick and numerous zombie biker thugs. Dr. Storm also has a Princess car, fitted with a giant blade that decapitates escapees and interfering parties. Abraham arrives at the Horror Hospital "looking for his chick" and is promptly whacked around the head by the motorcycle zombies. Frederick, fed up at literally being Storm's whipping boy, helps the kids escape as paving the way for the 1970s youth to put the final spanner/wrench in the works to Storm's scheme.

== Cast ==
- Michael Gough as Dr. Christian Storm
- Robin Askwith as Jason Jones
- Vanessa Shaw as Judy Peters
- Ellen Pollock as Aunt Harris
- Dennis Price as Mr. Pollack
- Skip Martin as Frederick
- Kurt Christian as Abraham Warren
- Barbara Wendy as Millie
- Kenneth Benda as Carter
- Martin Grace as bike boy
- Colin Skeaping as bike boy
- George Herbert as laboratory assistant
- Susan Murphy as lobotomy victim number 1.
- James Boris IV as "Mystic" band member (as James IV Boris)
- Alan Laurence Hudson as "Mystic" band member (as Allan "The River" Hudson)
- Simon Lust as "Mystic" band member
- Alan Watson as transvestite in club (uncredited)
- Antony Balch as bearded man in club/bike boy (uncredited)
- Ray Corbett as hunting man (uncredited)
- Richard Gordon as man in club (uncredited)

== Production ==
=== Background ===
After the success of his feature film debut Secrets of Sex (1969), an anthology sex film that flirted with horror themes, Antony Balch envisioned his second film as an out-and-out horror film and one with a continuous narrative. Location filming was undertaken in and around Knebworth House near Stevenage, Hertfordshire.

=== Writing ===
The script was written by Balch and his friend Alan Watson during the 1972 Cannes Film Festival, although the film's title was thought up before the plot. Among Watson's ideas for the Horror Hospital script was the lethal Rolls-Royce, with its giant blade that decapitated people as it drove by.

=== Filming ===
The film was shot during a four-week schedule beginning on 16 October 1972. Shooting was done at Merton Park (mainly the pop group scene), Battersea Town Hall (which provided the interiors of Brittlehurst Manor) and Knebworth House.

The film's last night party on 11 November was compromised when Phoebe Shaw served cake that was laced with drugs. In his autobiography, Askwith wrote "I don’t know what she put in the cake but I ended up with a twenty stone electrician Roy, sitting on my lap telling me he thought he was in love with me." Only producer Richard Gordon managed to avoid eating the cake.

=== Casting ===
Robin Askwith's role was specially written for him after he appeared in Gordon's previous 1972 production Tower of Evil. Balch asked Michael Gough to base his performance on Bela Lugosi, screening him a 16mm print of The Devil Bat, in which Lugosi plays a mad perfume manufacturer.

The female lead was taken by Phoebe Shaw, who had previously appeared in several TV commercials, and was renamed 'Vanessa Shaw' for the film. During filming, Shaw and Askwith briefly became lovers. Her only other known roles were an uncredited bit part in a 1969 American TV adaptation of David Copperfield and brief roles as a boutique assistant in Say Hello to Yesterday (1970) and a police cadet in Ooh… You Are Awful (1972). 'Dwarf' actor Skip Martin (who ran a tobacconist's shop in between acting assignments) and veteran character actor Dennis Price also appeared in the film, as well as Kurt Christian, whose full title was Baron Kurt Christian von Siengenberg, and who left the country not long after the film was released. His ambition at the time, according to Films and Filming magazine, was to "play a role that does not involve killing somebody".

Nicky Henson was originally considered for Christian's role.

=== Music ===
Horror Hospital contains a pop music number, "Mark of Death", composed by Jason DeHavilland and performed by the group Mystic (James IV Boris, Alan "The River" Hudson, Simon Lust).

== Reception ==
The Monthly Film Bulletin wrote: "If Horror Hospital is more consistently enjoyable than Secrets of Sex, this is perhaps not so much because it boasts a more illustrious cast as because the conventions of the horror film are at once more rigid and more susceptible to Balch's macabre bent. ... The dialogue maintains an unusually high standard of double entendre ... . And if Horror Hospital makes no serious attempt to replace the basic clichés, it at least celebrates their survival with a satirical relish seldom displayed on this side of the Atlantic."

Sight and Sound wrote: "Antony Balch's all-out assault on the conventions of the horror movie produces a ghoulish giggle or two in a tale of one of those health resorts where lobotomy turns out to be part of the cure. Reminiscent of early Corman in its camp sense of fun, and appropriately over-acted by most of the cast."

The Los Angeles Times wrote: "'In Antony Balch and Alan Watson's ludicrous screenplay, clichés mask for hipness and there is no thought behind the mind control. Director Balch mixes campy humor, gruesome deeds and brutal shock effects. Gough, who is appropriately ghoulish, wears a crimson cape and a tuxedo he may have borrowed from Dracula."

== Home media ==
The film was originally released on DVD in the US by Elite Entertainment on 2 November 1999. A new remastered DVD with a new commentary from producer Richard Gordon was released by Dark Sky Films on 15 June 2010.

The film was re-released on DVD and released for the first time on Blu-ray in the UK by Odeon on 10 August 2015.
