= Spy Story =

Spy Story may refer to:

- Spy Story (novel), a 1974 spy novel by Len Deighton
- Spy Story (film), a 1976 British espionage film, based on the novel
