= Patrick Armstrong =

Patrick Armstrong may refer to:

- Patrick Armstrong of Guildford Four and Maguire Seven
- Patrick Armstrong, the name used by a fictional intelligence officer in the 1974 novel Spy Story by Len Deighton
- Patrick Armstrong, character in the 1976 film Spy Story, based on the novel of the same name
