= Return to Sender (1963 British film) =

British film by Gordon Hales

- Theatrical release poster
- Directed by: Gordon Hales
- Written by: John Roddick
- Based on: a novel by Edgar Wallace
- Produced by: Jack Greenwood
- Starring: Nigel Davenport; Yvonne Romain; Geoffrey Keen
- Cinematography: Bert Mason
- Edited by: Gordon Hales
- Music by: Bernard Ebbinghouse
- Production company: Merton Park Studios
- Distributed by: Anglo-Amalgamated Film Distributors
- Release date: 12 March 1963
- Running time: 61 minutes
- Country: United Kingdom
- Language: English

Return to Sender is a 1963 British drama directed and edited by Gordon Hales and starring Nigel Davenport, Yvonne Romain and Geoffrey Keen. It was made at Merton Park Studios as part of the long-running series of Edgar Wallace adaptations.

== Plot ==
A corporate fraudster is arrested for stealing a large sum of money from his partners. When he learns that the prosecuting counsel is led by a particularly brilliant barrister, he attempts to undermine the barrister's credibility by employing a shady individual to use smear tactics against him.

== Cast ==
- Nigel Davenport as Dino Steffano
- Yvonne Romain as Lisa
- Geoffrey Keen as Robert Lindley
- William Russell as Mike Cochrane
- Jennifer Daniel as Beth
- Paul Williamson as Tony Shaw
- John Horsley as Supt. Gilchrist
- Gerald Andersen as Lloyd
- Richard Bird as Fox
- Marianne Stone as Kate
- Lucy Griffiths as Agatha

== Critical reception ==
The Monthly Film Bulletin wrote: "A conventional but well-produced thriller in the Edgar Wallace series. The complicated plot has an interesting twist, and is rather superior to the dialogue and characterisation."
