= Licensed to Love and Kill =

1979 British film Lindsay Shonteff

- Original film poster
- Directed by: Lindsay Shonteff
- Written by: Lindsay Shonteff (as Jeremy Lee Francis)
- Produced by: Elizabeth Gray
- Starring: Gareth Hunt
- Cinematography: Bill Patterson
- Edited by: Gerry Ivanov
- Music by: Leonard Young
- Production company: Lindsay Shonteff Film Productions
- Distributed by: Firebird Films
- Release date: August 1979 (UK)
- Running time: 94 minutes 78 minutes (US)
- Country: United Kingdom
- Language: English

Licensed to Love and Kill (VHS release titles The Man from S.E.X. and Undercover Lover) is a 1979 imitation James Bond film directed by Lindsay Shontef and starring Gareth Hunt. It was written by Shonteff (as Jeremy Lee Francis) and produced by his wife Elizabeth Gray.

== Plot ==
Secret Agent Charles Bind is called in to investigate the disappearance of Lord Dangerfield, a British diplomat. The trail leads Bind to Dangefield's daughter Carlotta Muff-Dangerfield who is called "Lotta Muff", an ambitious American Senator named Lucifer Orchid, and Bind's counterpart in the forces of evil, Ultra One.

== Cast ==
- Gareth Hunt as Charles Bind
- Nick Tate as Jensen Fury
- Fiona Curzon as Carlotta Muff-Dangerfield
- Geoffrey Keen as Stockwell
- Gary Hope as Senator Lucifer Orchid
- Don Fellows as vice-president
- John Arnatt as Merlin
- Toby Robins as Scarlet Star
- Imogen Hassall as Miss Martin
- John Junkin as helicopter mechanic
- Me Me Lai as Female Madam Wang
- Noel Johnson as Lord Dangerfield
- Anna Bergman as hotel receptionist
- Eiji Kusuhara as Male Madam Wang
- Doug Robinson as giant
- Deep Roy as midget

== Aspects of production ==
During the production of Henson and Shonteff's previous Charles Bind film No. 1 of the Secret Service (1977), a sequel was announced entitled An Orchid for No. 1. Though initially signed to Shonteff for three films, Nicky Henson was signed by the Royal Shakespeare Company. Henson was replaced by Gareth Hunt who was known for his role as secret agent Mike Gambit in The New Avengers (1976–77).

Geoffrey Keen repeated his role as Bind's M type superior Rockwell. The original Rockwell from the Tom Adams Charles Vine films was played by John Arnatt who returned to Shonteff's series playing Merlin, the Q type character who issues Bind his secret weapons. Fiona Curzon who plays the female lead had a smaller different role in the previous No 1. of the Secret Service. Gary Hope had a role as an Army officer in the first Vine film Licensed to Kill (1965).

== Soundtrack ==
Simon Bell wrote the music and Doreen Chanter composed and performed the theme song, Love is a Fine Thing.

== Reception ==
Alan Burton in Historical Dictionary of British Spy Fiction, which cites that "the cycle of spy films began to lose steam in the 1970s", and mentions Licensed to Love and Kill and its preceding film No. 1 of the Secret Service as "the odd picture [that] turned up in the cinema schedules", refers to both films as "crude parodies".
