= Uelmen =

Uelmen is a surname. Notable people with the surname include:

- Betty Uelmen (1919–1974), known professionally under the pen name Dail Ambler, British screenwriter
- Erich Uelmen (born 1996), American baseball player
- Gerald Uelmen (born 1940), American attorney
- Matt Uelmen (born 1972), American video game music composer
