= Kenneth Benda =

English actor (1902–1978)

- in The Avengers: A Sense of History (1966)
- Born: Charles Kenneth Anton Benda; 3 June 1902; Hampstead, London, England
- Died: 26 July 1978 (aged 76); Hammersmith, London, England
- Occupation: Actor
- Spouse: Lucy Evelyn Alston (m. 1932 - 1978)
- Children: Two (Anthony and Rosemary)

Charles Kenneth Anton Benda (3 June 1902 – 26 July 1978) was an English actor often on television. He appeared in British television series No Hiding Place, The Saint, The Avengers, Z-Cars, The Prisoner, Doctor Who, Doomwatch and films The Private Life of Sherlock Holmes, The Ruling Class, Horror Hospital, The Adventure of Sherlock Holmes' Smarter Brother, The Strange Case of the End of Civilization as We Know It, International Velvet and others. His stage appearances included small roles at The Old Vic and with Peter Hall's National Theatre company.

== Private life ==
Benda was the son of Charles Benda, a company director and merchant dealing in Oriental Goods. His grandparents, Anton Benda and his wife Frances Mandelbaum, both originally from the Kingdom of Bavaria, were naturalized as British subjects, and in the census of 1871 his grandfather was described as a foreign agent.

On 2 June 1932, at St Peter's, Cranley Gardens, he married Lucy Evelyn Alston, a daughter of Sir Beilby Alston. Their daughter Rosemary Evelyn was born in 1936. In 1960, she married Robert Calder-Smith and they had two daughters and three sons, Henrietta, Anthony, Victoria, Dominic and Benjamin.

Benda retired to the Old Vicarage, Crondall, near Farnham, Surrey, where he died in July 1978. His widow survived him until 1991. Both are buried at Crondall.

== Acting credits ==
Production	Notes	Role
No Hiding Place	"Deadline for Dummy" (1963)	Gen. Barnaby
The Scales of Justice	"The Undesirable Neighbour" (1963) "The Invisible Asset" (1963)	Judge; Club Member
The Plane Makers	"Loved He Not Honours More" (1963)	Indian Passenger
The Saint	"The Lawless Lady" (1964)	Lord Henry Wentworth
Call the Gun Expert	"The Teenage Murderer – 1926" (1964)	Bernard Spilsbury
Edgar Wallace Mysteries	"The Verdict (1964 film)" (1964) "Game for Three Losers" (1965)	Lord Chief Justice; Bryce
The Wednesday Play	"The Trial and Torture of Sir John Rampayne" (1965)	Sir John's Father
Bindle (One of Them Days)	Film (1966)	Rev. Sopley
Adam Adamant Lives!	2 episodes (1966)	Sir James
The Avengers	"A Sense of History" (1966) "From Venus with Love" (1967)	James Broom; Lord Mansford
Softly, Softly	"Selection" (1967)	Chief Constable Everett
Sir Arthur Conan Doyle	"Redhanded" (1967)	Lord Mannering
Theatre 625	"The Ragged Trousered Philanthropists" (1967)	Sir Graball D'Encloseland
The Prisoner	"Free for All" (1967)	Supervisor
The Franchise Trail	TV Film (1968)	Pharaoh Mamoulian
Detective	"The High Adventure" (1968)	Sir James Trevor
Z-Cars	"He Must Be Up to No Good: Part 2" (1968)	Sir Francis King
The Jazz Age	"Mister Jack Hollins Against Fate" (1968)	Sir Maurice Cope
BBC Play of the Month	"Maigret at Bay" (1969)	Jean-Baptiste Prieur
Callan	"Nice People Die at Home" (1969)	Doctor
A Touch of Love	Film (1969)	Mr. Stacey
Doctor in the House	"The War of the Mascots" (1969)	Sir William
Scream and Scream Again	Film (1970)	Prof. Kingsmill
Oh, Brother!	"By the Fleshpots" (1970)	
Take Three Girls	"Gloria for First Offence" (1970)	Second Assistant
Secrets of Sex	Film (1970)	Sacha Seremona
If It Moves, File It	"Walled in" (1970)	Admiral
The Private Life of Sherlock Holmes	Film (1970)	Minister
Biography	"Beethoven" (1970)	Schneller
The Befrienders	TV Film (1970)	Lawton
Doctor Who	2 episodes: "The Claws of Axos" (1971)	The Minister
Paul Temple	"Ricochet" (1971)	Gunther
The Guardians	"Head of State" (1971)	General
The Search for the Nile	"Find Livingstone" (1971)	Sir Henry Rawlinson
Justice	"To Help an Old School Friend" (1971)	Wetherby
The Regiment	"A Perfect Day" (1972)	Lord Chief Justice
Clouds of Witness Lord Peter Wimsey (TV series)	1st. broadcast episode (1972)	Serjeant-at-arms
The Ruling Class	Film (1972)	Lord Chancellor
Doomwatch	"Without the Bomb" (1972)	Clive Hughes
The Venturers	TV Film (1972)	Grumbold
Scoop	"A Surfeit of Boots" (1972)	Prime Minister
Arthur of the Britons	"The Gift of Life" (1972)	Ulrich
The Edwardians	"Daisy" (1973)	Archbishop of Canterbury
Horror Hospital	Film (1973)	Carter
Emmerdale	1 episode (1973)	Sir Gerald Scott
A Pin to See the Peepshow	1 episode (1973)	Crown counsel
The Dragon's Opponent	"The Battle" (1973)	Air Vice-Marshal
The Pallisers	2 episodes (1974)	Major Domo
Fall of Eagles	"Requiem for a Crown Prince" (1974)	Professor Widerhoffer
Play for Today	"The Cheviot, the Stag and the Black, Black Oil" (1974)	Duke of Sutherland
No, Honestly	2 episodes (1974)	Royle
The Early Life of Stephen Hind	1 episode (1974)	Wexford
The Stud	Film (1974)	Carruthers
Churchill's People	"The Fine Art of Bubble-Blowing" (1975)	Lord Grabble
The Adventure of Sherlock Holmes' Smarter Brother	Film (1975)	Butler
Wodehouse Playhouse	"The Code of the Mulliners" (1976)	Bagshot – Butler
The Strange Case of the End of Civilization as We Know It	Film (1977)	Sir Miles Messervey, 'M'
The Basil Brush Show	1 episode (1977)	
International Velvet	Film (1978)	Presentation Official
