= Dail Ambler =

British screenwriter (1919–1974)

Betty Mabel Lilian Uelmen
- Born: Betty Mabel Lilian Williams; 11 January 1919; Aldershot, Hampshire, England
- Died: 6 September 1974 (aged 55); Surrey, England
- Resting place: North Watford Cemetery, Watford, Hertfordshire, England
- Occupations: Journalist, screenwriter, pulp fiction writer
- Writing career
- Pen name: Dail Ambler, Danny Spade
- Genres: Pulp fiction, screenwriting
- Notable works: Beat Girl; Take Me Over; Delayed Flight; Night after Night after Night; The Dame Plays Rough; Waterfront Rat; Calling Mr. Spade; The Lady Says When; Honey, You Slay Me; White Curves and Black Coffee; The Virgin Collector; Three Men for the Job

Betty Mabel Lilian Uelmen (née Williams; 11 January 1919 – 6 September 1974) was a British journalist, screenwriter, and pulp fiction writer who used the pen names Dail Ambler and Danny Spade. She was also known professionally as both Betty Williams and Betty Uelmen.

== Life ==
She was born in Aldershot in Hampshire and worked as a Fleet Street journalist and correspondent before settling on a career in fiction writing. By 1950, she was publishing at least one novel a month under the Danny Spade name for pulp paperback publisher Scion Ltd; she later wrote for Milestone Publications. Her writing style and content were somewhat influenced by Mickey Spillane. After the boom in pulp fiction in the United Kingdom ended in the mid-1950s, she turned to screenwriting under the Dail Ambler name. She later lapsed into semi-retirement in Surrey, where she died at the age of 55.

She is buried under the name Dail Ambler in North Watford Cemetery in Watford, Hertfordshire.

== Selected work ==
=== Books ===
- The Dame Plays Rough (1950) by Danny Spade
- Waterfront Rat (1951) by Danny Spade
- Calling Mr. Spade (1952) by Danny Spade
- The Lady Says When (1952) by Dail Ambler
- Honey, You Slay Me (1953) by Danny Spade
- White Curves and Black Coffee (1953) by Danny Spade
- The Virgin Collector (1971) by Dail Ambler
- Three Men for the Job (1975) by Dail Ambler (posthumous)

=== Film ===
- Beat Girl (1960), directed by Edmond T. Gréville
- Take Me Over (1963), directed by Robert Lynn
- Delayed Flight (1964), directed by Michael Luckwell and Tony Young
- Night after Night after Night (1969), directed by Lindsay Shonteff

== Television ==
- two scripts for Armchair Theatre
  - The Pillars of Midnight (1958)
  - Murder in Slow Motion (1958)
- one episode for Harpers West One (1961)
