= Noel Johnson =

English actor (1916–1999)

- Recording Dick Barton
- Born: Noel Frank Johnson; 28 December 1916; West Bromwich, England
- Died: 1 October 1999 (aged 82); Llandough, Wales
- Occupation: Actor
- Years active: 1941–1997
- Spouse: Leonora Peacock (m. 1942)
- Children: 1

Noel Frank Johnson (28 December 1916 – 1 October 1999) was a British actor. He was the voice of special agent Dick Barton on BBC Radio and Dan Dare on Radio Luxembourg.

== Life ==
Johnson was born 28 December 1916 in West Bromwich, England and attended Bromsgrove School, where his fictional character Dick Barton was listed on the honours boards. He married Leonora Peacock in 1942: they had one son Gareth Johnson. He died 1 October 1999.

== Career ==
After wartime service in the Royal Army Service Corps, including evacuation from Dunkirk, he was invalided out, and joined the BBC Repertory Company in 1945. He was the original voice of Dick Barton from 7 October 1946, performing over 300 episodes before quitting in 1949 to pursue a stage career. He was paid £18 per week but felt that he deserved much more for such a popular character. He returned to play Dick Barton once more in a special series in 1972.

In 1969 he appeared in a BBC seven-part David Ellis radio thriller called Find The Lady. He later played Dan Dare on the Radio Luxembourg serial, but his name was kept secret. His assured upper class voice cadence made him ideal for certain characters, notably in the BBC Radio 4 dramatic adaptation of A Dance to the Music of Time by Anthony Powell. This was broadcast as 26 one-hour episodes between 1978 and 1981; Johnson played the novel sequence's narrator Nicholas Jenkins, while the younger Nicholas was played by Gareth Johnson in the first 18 episodes. In the last quarter of the series – in which Jenkins is in late middle-age – Johnson plays Jenkins alone.

His movie career included roles in Frenzy, The First Great Train Robbery, For Your Eyes Only and his last film Withnail & I in 1987, where he played a militaristic and drunken bar owner. Johnson also appeared in numerous television dramas until the mid-1990s, including A for Andromeda, The Andromeda Breakthrough, Dixon of Dock Green, Coronation Street, Out of the Unknown, Strangers and Brothers, Little Sir Nicholas, Doomwatch, Death of an Expert Witness, Colditz, Rumpole of the Bailey, Doctor Who (in the serials The Underwater Menace and Invasion of the Dinosaurs), Inspector Morse and A Touch of Frost, amongst many others.

== Filmography ==
Year	Title	Role	Notes
1950	Highly Dangerous	Frank Conway	Uncredited
1951	Appointment with Venus	Clark, R.N.	
1951	The Case of the Missing Scene	Crawford	
1955	Little Red Monkey	Det. Sgt. Hawkins	
1963	The Partner	Charles Briers	
1966	Bat Out of Hell (TV series)	George Stewart	Five episodes
1972	Frenzy	Doctor in Pub	
1974	Frightmare	The Judge	
1974	The Swordsman	Christian Duval	
1975	Royal Flash	Lord Chamberlain	
1978	The First Great Train Robbery	Connaught	
1979	Licensed to Love and Kill	Lord Dangerfield	
1980	Love in a Cold Climate	Lord Stromboli	TV Mini-Series, 1 episode
1981	Lady Killers	Thomas Inskip	Episode: "The Darlingest Boy"
1981	For Your Eyes Only	Jack, Vice Admiral	
1986	Defence of the Realm	Club Member	
1987	Withnail and I	General	
