= How Sleep the Brave =

1982 film by Lindsay Shonteff

- Directed by: Lindsay Shonteff (as Lyndon James Swift)
- Written by: Bobby Bauer; Jeremy Lee Francis
- Produced by: Lindsay Shonteff; Elizabeth Laurie
- Starring: Lawrence Day; Luis Manuel; Thomas M. Polland; Christopher Muncke
- Cinematography: Sabastian Rich
- Edited by: John Luton
- Production company: Lindsay Shonteff Film Productions
- Distributed by: Movietime International
- Release date: 1982
- Running time: 90 mins
- Country: United Kingdom
- Language: English

How Sleep the Brave is a 1982 Vietnam war film directed and produced by Lindsay Shonteff. Entirely shot in Berkshire, England, it stars Lawrence Day, Luis Manuel, Thomas M. Polland and Christopher Muncke. The script was written by Bobby Bauer and Jeremy Lee Francis. It was co-produced by Elizabeth Laurie and Lindsay Shonteff.

== Synopsis ==
On Christmas 1969, during the Vietnam War, a group of fresh, young American soldiers arrive at an army camp in Vietnam and are sent to patrol in a nearby jungle. After they kill a few Viet Cong soldiers and lose a couple of their comrades in the battle, they return to camp. They are sent on a mission to destroy a Viet Cong village. After they destroy the village, they embark on a hazardous journey through a jungle to board a helicopter and return to camp. But, it's only a matter of who will survive the Viet Cong's gunshots and make it to the helicopter.
