= Elliott Stein =

American film critic (1928–2012)

Elliott Stein (December 5, 1928 – November 7, 2012) was an American film critic, historian, programmer, and scriptwriter.

In the 1950s, he managed Janus, a literary review in Paris, and was a film critic there from 1960 to 1970. He also wrote for the review Bizarre with Kenneth Anger and later collaborated on Anger's book Hollywood Babylon.

Returning to New York City in the 1970s, Stein wrote for the Criterion Collection, Film Comment, the Financial Times The New York Times, Rolling Stone, Sight and Sound, The Village Voice, The Soho Weekly News, and others.

Stein is referred to in the diaries and memoirs of Ned Rorem, Susan Sontag, John Ashbery and Richard Olney. He co-wrote the films Secrets of Sex (1970) and New York City Inferno (1978), and acted in others including Les Coeurs Verts (1965) by Édouard Luntz and Secrets of Sex (1970), playing the dual role of the strange young man and the Mummy.
