= Night After Night After Night =

1969 British film by Lewis J. Force (Lindsay Shonteff)

- Theatrical release poster
- Directed by: Lewis J. Force (Lindsay Shonteff)
- Screenplay by: Dail Ambler
- Produced by: James Mellor
- Starring: Jack May Justine Lord Gilbert Wynne
- Cinematography: Douglas Hill
- Edited by: John Rushton
- Music by: Douglas Gamley
- Production company: Dudley Birch Films
- Distributed by: Butcher's Film Distributors
- Release date: 1969
- Running time: 88 minutes
- Country: United Kingdom
- Language: English

Night After Night After Night, also known as Come Nightfall, He Kills Night after Night after Night, and The Night Slasher, is a 1969 British thriller film directed by Lindsay Shonteff (as Lewis J. Force) and starring Jack May, Justine Lord and Gilbert Wynne. It was written by Dail Ambler.

== Plot ==
Four women have been murdered and Detective Inspector Bill Rowan is investigating. He believes that young thug and convicted rapist Peter Laver is responsible. When Rowan's own wife becomes the fifth victim, and yet two more women are murdered, Rowan arrests Laver on a spurious charge, and he is convicted for the latest murder, for which he has no alibi. Judge Charles Lomax presides over the murder case, and suffers a breakdown midway through the case. Discovering that the judge has a secret room full of pornography and S&M equipment, Rowan realizes that in fact, Lomax is the murderer.

== Cast ==
- Jack May as Judge Charles Lomax
- Justine Lord as Helena Lomax
- Gilbert Wynne as Detective Inspector Bill Rowan
- Donald Sumpter as Peter Laver
- Gary Hope as counsel
- Linda Marlowe as Jenny Rowan
- Jack Smethurst as chief inspector
- Terry Scully as Carter
- Peter Forbes-Robertson as Powell
- Jacqueline Clerk as Josie Leach
- Michael Nightingale as Martingale, the solicitor
- John Gabriel as counsel
- Elisabeth Murray as Marion Brown
- Walter Horsbrugh as doctor
- Simon Lack as Endell's Q.C.
- Bernard G. High as witness
- Roy Skelton as counsel
- Carol Haddon as 1st prostitute (in car)
- Yvonne Paul as 2nd prostitute
- April Harlow as 1st stripper
- Shirley Easton as 2nd stripper
- Philip Caton as David Endell (uncredited)

== Critical reception ==
The Monthly Film Bulletin wrote: "Lurid, pedestrian and totally unconvincing thriller whose contrived script throws up so conspicuous a red herring that the identity of the real villain is never in any doubt. The accent throughout is on sexual deviation and sleazy thrills; which is just as well, since if the plot weren't so ludicrous, it might raise some mildly serious questions about how such an obviously psychopathic judge (black wigs and leather gear are mere incidental diversions) came to be appointed in the first place."

Kine Weekly wrote: "Simple melodrama with a spice of blood, sex, and insanity, this will pass in most situations. X fare for the uncritical. ...The plot is a pretty heavy amalgam of false clues and values, but the identity of the mad murderer is not likely to puzzle practised audiences, in spite of contrived red herrings such as making the judge's clerk a wild-eyed, but harmless, sexual pervert. The main story of mystery, murder and detection is unnecessarily held up by inclusion of love scenes illustrating Pete Laver's lusty habits and the ending is anticlimax. That experienced actor Jack May gives the part of Judge Lomax all the essential melodramatic overtones and Gilbert Wynne walks competently through the role of Inspector Rowan. Donald Sumpter enjoys a far meatier character as Pete Laver, and Justine Lord combines beauty and worry as the judge's neglected wife."
