= The Venturers =

1975 British TV drama series

- Written by: Donald Bull
- Starring: Geoffrey Keen
- Country of origin: United Kingdom
- No. of episodes: 10

Production
- Running time: 50 min

Original release
- Network: BBC1
- Release: 7 January – 11 March 1975

The Venturers is a British television series produced by the BBC in 1975.

The series, created by Donald Bull, had started out as an edition of Drama Playhouse in 1972 before being commissioned as an ongoing series. The Venturers took place in the high pressure world of Prince's merchant bank and dealt with the intricacies of high finance amongst its millionaire clients.

Geoffrey Keen starred as director Gerald Lang, in a virtual reprise of his role as oil executive Brian Stead in Mogul / The Troubleshooters. Other major cast members included James Kerry, David Buck, Cyril Luckham and William Squire.

The Venturers lasted for a single series of ten episodes.

== Cast ==
- Geoffrey Keen as Gerald Lang
- David Buck as Tom Prince
- James Kerry as David Ayrton
- Karin MacCarthy as Dorothy Ayrton
- Hugh Manning as Freddie Pander
- Cyril Luckham as Lord Kilvern
- William Squire as Sir George Fielding
- Nigel Bradshaw as Jimmy
