= Antony Balch =

English film director and distributor

- Balch in Bill and Tony (1972)
- Born: 10 September 1937; London, England
- Died: 6 April 1980 (aged 42)
- Occupations: Film director and film distributor

Antony Balch (10 September 1937 – 6 April 1980) was an English film director and distributor, best known for his screen collaborations with Beat Generation author William S. Burroughs in the 1960s and for the 1970s horror film, Horror Hospital.

== Biography ==
Balch's fixation for horror and exploitation movies began early in life, culminating in a school-aged Balch meeting his idol Bela Lugosi in Brighton, England in the early 1950s. Lugosi was touring in a stage version of Dracula at the time.

Working his way into the British film industry, Balch directed adverts for Camay soap, and a 30-second commercial for Kit-E-Kat.

In the early part of the 1960s he lived briefly in France working as a location scout and subtitler of French films for their British releases. In Paris, Balch became friendly with radical artists such as William Burroughs and Kenneth Anger. Burroughs and Balch met at Madame Rachou's Beat Hotel, and the two quickly became collaborators. In Barry Miles’ biography of Burroughs, Balch is described as "gay, well dressed with dark hair and an eager smile. After a few drinks he could be quite camp: 'The trouble with fish is that they are so fisheee!’ he once shrieked in a restaurant".

Balch gets a "special thanks" credit in Burroughs' novel The Ticket That Exploded and directed the Burroughs-influenced experimental film, Towers Open Fire among other short works. In 1963, Balch attended a showing of the 1930s horror film, Freaks and decided to become a distributor in order to open the film in London. Freaks had been banned in Britain since 1932, but, with the help of Anger, Balch bought the British rights to the film. He released Freaks and Towers Open Fire as part of a triple-bill.

Balch was next hired to run two movie theatres in London—The Jacey in Piccadilly Circus and The Times in Baker Street. Balch did everything from choosing what films played, to organizing the front-of-house displays, to keeping an eye on projectionists and janitorial staff. Whereas The Times was more rep oriented, The Jacey specialized in playing exploitation films like Nudist Paradise and the Japanese horror/art-house hit Onibaba. Meanwhile, Balch carried on his career as a distributor, eventually releasing films such as The Corpse Grinders, Kenneth Anger's Invocation of My Demon Brother, Paul Bowles in Morocco, and Russ Meyer's Supervixens. Balch was one of the first people to embrace art, horror and exploitation films with equal enthusiasm, a view that was hardly shared by many film critics of the time.

Throughout the 1960s and 1970s his special niche was releasing foreign sex films. Most of the sex films Balch released in the UK had been purchased at the Cannes or Venice film festivals; with no stars or name directors they cost next to nothing. Balch then added his own personal touch, giving the films tongue-in-cheek English titles and eye catching campaigns like "No photographs permitted of this controversial X Film" (from When Girls Undress). Balch worked out of an office in Golden Square, Soho and lived in Dalmeney Court on Duke Street. Dalmeney Court's other occupants included Burroughs and artist Brion Gysin plus the occasional celebrity passing through such as The Animals’ Eric Burdon.

A second Balch/Burroughs collaboration film, The Cut-Ups opened in London in 1967. This was part of an abandoned project called Guerrilla Conditions meant as a documentary on Burroughs and filmed throughout 1961-1965. Inspired by Burroughs' and Gysin's technique of cutting up text and rearranging it in random order, Balch had an editor cut his footage for the documentary into little pieces and impose no control over its reassembly. The film opened at Oxford Street's Cinephone cinema and had a disturbing reaction. Many audience members claimed the film made them ill, others demanded their money back, while some just stumbled out of the cinema ranting "its disgusting".

Included in The Cut-Ups are shots of Burroughs acting out scenes from his book Naked Lunch. The idea of bringing Naked Lunch to the big-screen was Balch's dream project. First developed in 1964, a script with musical numbers was completed in the early 1970s, and the project announced to the press in March 1971. Personal differences between Balch and the film's would-be leading man Mick Jagger however caused the project's collapse. According to Literary Outlaw, Ted Morgan's 1988 biography of Burroughs, Jagger "thought Balch was coming on to him sexually, and in any case didn’t have a reputation as a director in the industry".

Balch found a more committed investor for his plans to make feature films in producer Richard Gordon. Gordon had a long history in horror cinema, and had been partly responsible for the stage version of Dracula that had allowed Balch to meet Lugosi. Their first film together was shot from a script never fully completed. With Balch using his own money to fund half of the budget what emerged was the deceptively titled Secrets of Sex (1970). Balch's feature debut is in fact a multi-genre anthology film which blends slapstick comedy, spy spoof, bloody horror movie and softcore sex film under the pretext of being a comment on the battle of the sexes. Secrets of Sex was a sensation, running for six months at the Piccadilly Jacey.

Encouraged by the film's British success, Balch and Gordon set about a second collaboration called Horror Hospital (1973). In the classic exploitation film tradition, the title was invented before the plot. Balch then spent his time locked in a hotel room with co-writer Alan Watson until the script was complete. Horror Hospital featured Michael Gough as the very Lugosi-like Dr. Storm. When Gough asked Balch what he wanted bringing to the role Balch screened him The Devil Bat, a Lugosi classic about a mad scientist masquerading as a perfume inventor. Horror Hospital was the most successful of all of Balch's films.

While other projects were discussed, including a comedy called The Sex Life of Adolf Hitler and a horror film co-written by Christopher Wicking, Balch never made another feature film. Speaking to the critic Kim Newman in Shock Xpress magazine (vol.2, no.5, 1988), Wicking recalled "I had a crazy meeting with him, when he wanted to do some picture or other. He spent most of the time walking across the furniture. Languorously, he would walk across three or four chairs. He went into another little world. He was a sad figure in a way, because he was well before his time".

In 1978, Balch was diagnosed with stomach cancer, and died on 6 April 1980 aged 42.

In 2014, the first book about Antony Balch's life and career, Guerilla Conditions, la folle épopée cinématographique d'Antony Balch avec William Burroughs, Richard Gordon et tous les autres was published (Adrien Clerc, Ledatape Organisation).

== Filmography ==
=== As director ===
==== Short films ====
- Towers Open Fire (1962–1963)
- Guerrilla Conditions (uncompleted)
- The Cut-Ups (1966)
- Bill and Tony a.k.a. Who’s Who (1972)
- Ghosts at Number 9 a.k.a. Ghosts at Number 9 (paris) (1982, posthumously released short film compiled from reels of film found at Balch's office after his death)
- William Buys a Parrot (posthumously released 1982)

==== Feature films ====
- Secrets of Sex (1970)
- Horror Hospital (1973)

=== As distributor ===
- Freaks (1963)
- Towers Open Fire (1964)
- The Burning Court (1965)
- Men and Women (1965)
- Une fille et des fusils (1966)
- Gift (1966)
- The Comic Strip Hero (1967)
- The Cut-Ups (1968)
- Hercules Against the Barbarians (1968)
- Requiem for a Gunfighter (1968)
- Häxan, or Witchcraft Through the Ages (1968)
- Run, Angel, Run! (1969)
- Invocation of My Demon Brother (1969)
- The Gay Deceivers (1970)
- Love 65 (1970)
- Secrets of Sex (1970)
- Daughter of Horror (1971)
- Paul Bowles in Morocco (1971)
- Don't Deliver Us from Evil (1971)
- Horror Hospital (1973)
- Doctor in the Nude (1974)
- Bill and Tony (1974)
- Mama's Dirty Girls (1975)
- Truck Stop Women (1975)
- Supervixens (1977)
- Black Snake a.k.a. Slaves (1977)
