= Clegg (film) =

1970 British film by Lindsay Shonteff

- U.K. theatrical release poster
- Directed by: Lindsay Shonteff
- Written by: Lewis J. Hagleton
- Produced by: Lindsay Shonteff (credited as Lewis J. Force)
- Starring: Gilbert Wynne; Norman Claridge; Gilly Grant
- Cinematography: John C. Taylor
- Edited by: Jackson Bowdell
- Music by: Paul Ferris
- Production company: Lindsay Shonteff Film Productions
- Distributed by: Tigon Films
- Release date: 1970
- Running time: 85 minutes
- Country: United Kingdom
- Language: English

Clegg (also known as The Bullet Machine, Clegg Private Eye and Harry and the Hookers) is a 1970 British crime film directed by Lindsay Shonteff and starring Gilbert Wynne in his first starring film role. It was written by Lewis J. Hagleton.

== Plot ==
Ex-policeman and now private detective Harry Clegg is hired by wealthy businessman Lord Cruickshank to investigate a death-threat letter he has received, which leads to a string of murders, some by Clegg himself.

== Cast ==
- Gilbert Wynne as Harry Clegg
- Norman Claridge as Lord Cruickshank
- Gilly Grant as Suzy the slag
- Gary Hope as Wildman
- Ronald Leigh-Hunt as Inspector Kert
- Michael Nightingale as Col. Sullivan
- A. J. Brown as Joseph Valentine
- Noel Davis as manager
- Margery Mason as neighbour
- Sue Bond as panties girl

== Production ==
The film was shot in various locations around London including the Docklands and Highgate Cemetery, as well as in Paris.

Shonteff said in an interview: "It was made for peanuts [and] my blood ...The final budget was [$26,500 American] for a colour 35mm feature, which meant making a lot of tough deals, paying people very little money, and shooting in four weeks. But we finished it and the picture did okay."

== Critical reception ==
The Monthly Film Bulletin wrote: "A pathetic attempt to transplant the private eye thriller to the British scene, high on violence and low on style. The hero's attempts to deliver his sub-Chandlerian wisecracks with the weary cynicism of a Philip Marlowe are merely embarrassing, while Lindsay Shonteff's idea of direction seems to be to squeeze in as many massive close-ups of guns, telephones and osculating lips as possible. 'It happens in all the Bogart movies,' says Clegg at one point: the trouble is that there it happens so much better."
