= Don Fellows =

American actor (1922–2007)

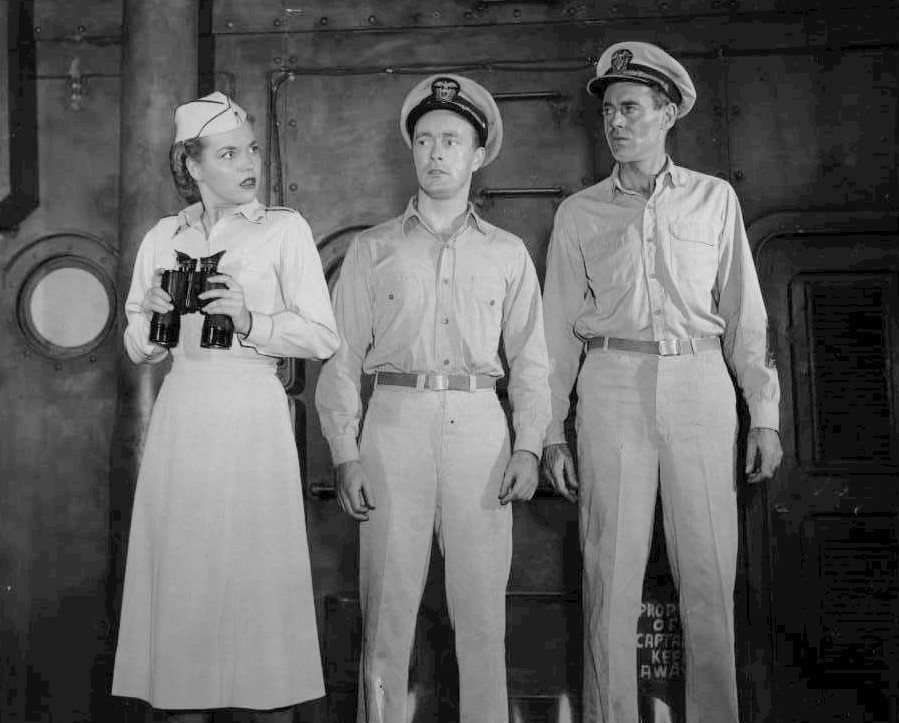
- Fellows (center) as Ensign Pulver with Patricia Ferris and Henry Fonda in Mister Roberts on Broadway
- Born: December 2, 1922; Salt Lake City, Utah, U.S.
- Died: October 21, 2007 (aged 84); London, England
- Education: University of Wisconsin
- Occupation: Actor
- Years active: 1948–2002
- Organization: Actors Studio
- Spouse: Miranda Willis (m. 1970) (2nd marriage)
- Children: 4

Don Fellows (December 2, 1922 – October 21, 2007) was an American actor known for his roles in British theater and television.

Born in Salt Lake City, Utah and raised in Madison, Wisconsin, Fellows served in the United States Merchant Marine during World War II. He was a graduate of the University of Wisconsin and a member of the Actors Studio. He moved to London in 1973 to further his stage career.

Fellows' TV appearances included Space: 1999, Z Cars, Lillie, The Sandbaggers, The Citadel, The Beiderbecke Tapes, The Bill and Inspector Morse.

His film appearances included Spy Story (1976), The Omen (1976), Twilight's Last Gleaming (1977), Valentino (1977), Licensed to Love and Kill (1979), Raiders of the Lost Ark (1981), Eye of the Needle (1981), Who Dares Wins (1982), Electric Dreams (1984), Superman IV: The Quest for Peace (1987) and Velvet Goldmine (1998).

He featured alongside fellow American expatriate actor Ed Bishop in the radio series The BBC Presents: Philip Marlowe.

In 1992, he played the part of Conn Kortchmar, an American GI, in the Radio 4 drama The Archers.

Throughout his life, Fellows suffered from a stutter, which he was able to suppress while acting. He died in 2007, at the age of 84.

== Filmography ==
- The Detective (1968) as Reporter (uncredited)
- Pretty Poison (1968) as Detective
- Symbiopsychotaxiplasm (1968) as Himself
- Trick Baby (1972) as Phillips
- Soft Beds, Hard Battles (1974) as Senior Counsellor (uncredited)
- The Spikes Gang (1974) as Cowboy
- Inside Out (1975) as U.S. Colonel
- The Omen (1976) as Thorn's Second Aide
- Death Play (1976) as Arthur
- Spy Story (1976) as Colonel Schlegel
- Twilight's Last Gleaming (1977) as Gen. Stonesifer
- Valentino (1977) as George Melford
- Lillie (1978, TV) as J. M. Whistler
- The Adventures of Pinocchio (1978) as the Green Fisherman (English version, voice; uncredited)
- The London Connection (1979) as General
- Licensed to Love and Kill (1979) as Vice-President
- Ike (1979, TV) as Gen. Carl Spaatz
- Tales of the Unexpected (1979, TV) as Renshaw
- Superman II (1980) as General
- Raiders of the Lost Ark (1981) as Col. Musgrove
- Eye of the Needle (1981) as American Colonel
- Who Dares Wins (1982) as Ambassador Franklin
- Enigma (1982)
- Electric Dreams (1984) as Mr. Ryley
- Odin: Photon Sailer Starlight (1985) as Suzuka (1992) (English version, voice)
- Reunion at Fairborough (1985) as Duffy
- The American Way (1986) as Capt. War Hero
- Haunted Honeymoon (1986) as Producer
- Superman IV: The Quest for Peace (1987) as Levon Hornsby
- Jeeves and Wooster: Safety in New York / Bertie Sets Sail (1992) as J. Washburn Stoker
- Patlabor: The Movie (1989) as Jitsuyama (1995) (English version, voice)
- Felidae (1994) as Dr. Preterius (English version, voice; uncredited)
- Ekkusu (1996) as Nataku (English version, voice; uncredited)
- Bye Bye, Lady Liberty (1996) as Silverman (English version, voice)
- Velvet Goldmine (1998) as Lou
- The Man Who Cried (2000) as Joe
