= Delayed Flight (film) =

1964 British film by Tony Young

- Theatrical release poster
- Directed by: Tony Young
- Screenplay by: Dail Ambler
- Produced by: Bill Luckwell; David Vigo
- Starring: Helen Cherry; Hugh McDermott
- Cinematography: Walter J. Harvey (as Jimmy Harvey, B.S.C.)
- Edited by: Norman Cohen
- Music by: Wilfred Burns
- Production companies: Luckwell Productions; Hammer Film Productions
- Distributed by: Columbia Pictures
- Release date: 1964
- Running time: 62 minutes
- Country: United Kingdom

Delayed Flight is a 1964 British low-budget 'B' thriller film directed by Tony Young, and starring Helen Cherry and Hugh McDermott. The screenplay was by Dail Ambler.

== Plot ==
An airline flight lands at an airport in England, where the passengers are told they must be delayed and quarantined for 24 hours due to a smallpox scare. Two of them, Helen Strickland and American Army Lt. Col. Calvin Brampton, escape. A third passenger, a secret agent, also escapes but is fatally shot. Before dying, he entrusts important official documents to Brampton to be delivered to the Prime Minister. Meanwhile, Strickland is also heading to London to intercept a private letter that must not be seen by her husband.

The two team up and are pursued by the police for breaking quarantine, and by the two sinister henchmen who shot the secret agent and who work for an organization that wants the documents in order to instigate an uprising in Africa. After various adventures, Calvin and Strickland achieve their ends and say their farewells. The smallpox scare turns out to have been nothing more than a case of chicken pox.

== Cast ==
- Helen Cherry as Helen Strickland
- Hugh McDermott as Lieutenant Colonel Calvin Brampton
- Paul Williamson as Shentor
- Neal Arden as Hicks
- John Watson as Dooley
- Hector Ross as Styles
- Totti Truman Taylor as doctor
- Patrick Jordan as Carter
- Ross Hutchinson as Haines
- Jessie Barclay as receptionist
- Keith Rawlings as Police Inspector
- Nicolette Pendrell as air hostess

== Production ==
Delayed Flight was filmed in March 1964 at Bray Studios as a supporting feature, with the financial involvement of Hammer Film Productions as well as Bill Luckwell's own company.

This was the last film produced by Luckwell, and was the second of two thrillers (the other being The Runaway (1964), shot back-to-back with Delayed Flight) which he and Young made at Bray Studios, owned at that time by Hammer Films.

== Release ==
The film was intended to be distributed by Columbia Pictures, but was not released in the UK or US. In Australia, it was shown to accompany other Columbia films such as Fail Safe (1964) and The Long Ships (1964).
