= Sue Bond =

British actress (born 1945)

- Born: 9 May 1945 (age 81); Aylesbury, Buckinghamshire, England
- Occupations: Actress; cabaret singer; comedian
- Years active: 1969–1986
- Spouse: David Bond

Sue Bond (born 9 May 1945) is a British actress, cabaret singer and comedian, best remembered for her appearances on The Benny Hill Show in the early 1970s. She appeared with Benny Hill for three years between 1970 and 1973, making her one of the longest serving female cast members of the pre-Hill's Angels era. In the mid-1970s, Bond appeared increasingly in sitcoms.

Alongside of her acting, Bond had a second career as a singer, mainly on the Northern Club Circuit. Her last acting credit to date was in the short-lived revival of Mind Your Language in 1986, but she continued singing on the cabaret circuit into the early 1990s.

== Acting roles ==
- The Nine Ages of Nakedness (1969; 'Serving Girl')
- Clegg (1970; 'Panty Girl')
- Secrets of Sex (1970; 'The Call Girl')
- The Benny Hill Show (1970–73, TV)
- The Yes Girls (1971, 'Maria')
- Freelance (1971, 'Girl in blue film')
- Casanova (1971, TV; 'Whore')
- Now Look Here (1971, TV)
- The Magnificent Seven Deadly Sins (1971; 'Girl with Glasses')
- The Fenn Street Gang (1971; 'Dolly')
- Doctor in Charge (1972, TV)
- Love Thy Neighbour (1972, TV; 'Barmaid')
- White Cargo (1973; 'Desiree')
- Not On Your Nellie (1973, TV; 'Girl on Coach'/title sequence, uncredited)
- The Creeping Flesh (1973; 'Girl in Tavern', uncredited)
- On the Buses (1973, TV; episode: Olive’s Divorce, Clippie (uncredited))
- Thriller: File It Under Fear (1973, TV; 'Karen')
- And Mother Makes Three (1973, TV; 'Nellie McQueen')
- O Lucky Man! (1973)
- Billy Liar (1973, TV; 'Dishy Bird')
- Dixon of Dock Green (1974, TV; 'Marion')
- A Little Bit of Wisdom (1974, TV; 'Showgirl')
- Love Thy Neighbour (1974, TV; 'Amy')
- The Best of Benny Hill (1974)
- And Mother Makes Five (1975, TV; 'Shop Assistant')
- Spring and Autumn (1975, TV; 'Barmaid')
- Jack and the Beanstalk (1975, stage; 'Fairy Queen')
- Look: Mike Yarwood (1976, TV)
- George and Mildred (1977, TV; 'Cynthia')
- Robin's Nest (1979, TV; 'Fiona')
- George and Mildred (1979, TV; 'Gloria')
- Tommy (1979, stage; 'The Nurse')
- Leave Him to Heaven (1979, TV; 'Janine')
- George and Mildred: The Movie (1980; 'Marlene')
- All Creatures Great and Small (1980, TV; 'Lydia')
- Keep It in the Family (1980, TV; 'Mimi')
- Let There Be Love (1982, TV; 'Neighbour')
- Janet and Company (1982, TV)
- Jack of Diamonds (1983, TV; 'Gloria')
- Mind Your Language (1986, TV; 'Rita')
