= Gilbert Wynne =

Welsh actor (born 1934)

- Born: 7 September 1934 (age 91); Hawarden, Flintshire, Wales
- Education: Royal Academy of Dramatic Art
- Occupation: Actor
- Notable work: Doctor Who: The Krotons (1968–69)
- Spouse: Gaynor James (m. 1959)

Gilbert Wynne (born 7 September 1934) is a British television actor.

Graduating from RADA in 1961, he started his career appearing at Nottingham Repertory and then appeared at the Old Vic (both London and Bristol), Regent's Park Open Air Theatre and with the Ravinia Shakespeare Company in Chicago.

Wynne appeared in a number of television programmes, including Lady Killers, Softly Softly and The Life and Times of David Lloyd George.

He had the title role in Clegg and played a Detective Inspector in Night After Night After Night. In addition, Wynne also played the main dance judge in the music video to Geri Halliwell's rendition of It's Raining Men.
