= Big Zapper =

1973 British film by Lindsay Shonteff

- Directed by: Lindsay Shonteff
- Written by: Hugh Brody
- Produced by: Lindsay Shonteff; Elizabeth Gray
- Starring: Linda Marlowe; Gary Hope; Sean Hewitt
- Cinematography: John C. Taylor
- Edited by: Spencer Reeve
- Music by: Colin Pearson
- Production companies: Delta Film Company; Lindsay Shonteff Film Productions
- Distributed by: Miracle Films
- Release date: 20 September 1973
- Running time: 92 minutes
- Country: United Kingdom
- Language: English

Big Zapper (also known as The Sex Life of a Female Private Eye), is a 1973 British action film directed by Lindsay Shonteff and starring Linda Marlowe, Gary Hope and Sean Hewitt. It was written by Hugh Brody, and was followed by a sequel, The Swordsman (1974).

== Plot ==
Harriet Zapper is a detective hired by Jeremiah Horn to locate his missing daughter Pandora, who has in fact been murdered by gangland boss Kono. Attempting to investigate, her brother Septimus is also killed by Kono. With the help of three samurai imported from Japan, Zapper pursues Kono and, with her skills in unarmed combat, brings him to justice.

== Cast ==
- Linda Marlowe as Harriet Zapper
- Gary Hope as Kono
- Sean Hewitt as Fingers
- Michael O'Malley as Strawberry Jim
- Richard Monette as Rock Hard
- Jack May as Jeremiah Horn
- Penny Irving as Maggie
- Stuart Lock as Septimus / Randy Horn
- Bobbi Anne as Pandora Horn / Pandy
- Kristopher Kum as samurai
- Hock Chuan as samurai
- Tony Hiew as samurai
- William Ridoutt as Shawn Cobra
- Graham Ashley as Cortini

== Critical reception ==
The Monthly Film Bulletin wrote: "A paltry and nasty sexual fantasy which looks as though it has been dreamed up for the entertainment of impotent sadists. ... Attempting some kind of balance between jokiness and titillation, Shonteff effectively stifles both. The feeble jokes and tricks fail to camouflage the dominant motif: knives penetrate, blood gushes, heads roll. And to crown it all, particularly inane use is made of a cod Chandler narration."

Russel Davies wrote in The Observer: "Big Zapper is a crude abomination which director/producer Lindsay Shonteff may look back to with shame when he grows up. Starring Linda Marlowe, she has the legs of Arkle and the face of an actress with possibilities, it is a non-stop, non-start action-comic, a mindless farrago of chops and slashes narrated by Miss Marlowe in the would-be deadly monotone of a Michaela Spillane."

The Jerusalem Post wrote: "Big Zapper will surely be a strong contender for the worst film of the year. This British picture, produced and directed by Lindsay Shonteff, bears some resemblance to Mr. Hercules Against Karate, which is now being shown in Israel. But while the latter is an amusing, almost non-violent spoof on the current "karate craze" in the cinema, Big Zapper is a nauseatingly brutal piece. Moreover, though it is often incredibly silly, the film is never even remotely funny. ... Slick and sickening."
