= The Swordsman (1974 film) =

1974 British film by Lindsay Shonteff

- Directed by: Lindsay Shonteff
- Written by: Hugh Brody
- Produced by: Lindsay Shonteff; Elizabeth Gray; Stuart Black
- Starring: Linda Marlowe; Alan Lake; Edina Ronay
- Cinematography: Les Young
- Edited by: Anton Schiller
- Music by: Colin Pearson; Roger Wootton
- Production company: Lindsay Shonteff Film Productions
- Distributed by: Rank Film Distributors
- Release dates: 1974; 27 June 1976
- Running time: 90 minutes
- Country: United Kingdom
- Language: English

The Swordsman (also known as Zapper's Blade of Veangeance) is a 1974 British action film directed by Lindsay Shonteff and starring Linda Marlowe, Alan Lake and Edina Ronay. It was written by Hugh Brody. It is a sequel to Big Zapper (1973) and follows the adventures of female private detective Harriet Zapper.

== Plot ==
Reynaud Duval runs a fencing school, and wanting to be his father's sole heir, forces him to write a false will and then murders him. He leaves a note with the body which incriminates master swordsman Zendor. Duval's younger brother Karel hires detective Harriet Zapper and her Chinese side-kick Hock to investigate.

== Cast ==
- Linda Marlowe as Harriet Zapper
- Alan Lake as Reynaud Duval
- Jason Kemp as Karel Duval
- Tony Then as Hock
- Edina Ronay as Guy Champion
- Noel Johnson as Christian Duval
- Peter Halliday as Rabelais
- Michael O'Malley as Gendarme
- Graham Ashley as bar-fly
- William Ridoutt as Inspector Cook
- David Robb as Alex Zendor

== Production ==
It was produced in 1974, including location shooting in the South of France around Nice.

== Release ==
In 1976 it was released on the Odeon Circuit by Rank Film Distributors.

== Critical reception ==
The Monthly Film Bulletin wrote: "The Swordsman is remarkable only for the relentless consistency with which it apes the style of the more overblown TV commercials. Making pseudo-sophisticated hay of swashbuckling adventure, sub-Bond chicanery and the private eye thriller, the film is never more embarrassing than in its archly knowing references to other movies, from Bogart ... to Jane Russell. All of which, as the script labours over the slightest of exchanges and the plot staggers from implausibility to implausibility, only underlines ineptness of the present material."

Screen International wrote: "After a splendidly bizarre beginning that establishes Reynaud and Guy as cartoon strip baddies in butch black clobber, the film loses pace and much of its impudent vitality. Harriet has lost her drive and aggressive sexuality; and her scenes with Hock are played with a down-beat slowness that make her reactions to his enthusiasm and energy seem closer to those of an overtired mother than the hard-bitten disillusionment of a Samantha Spade or Phillipa Marlowe. Alan Lake makes a superb villain of melodrama, a larger than life swashbuckling baddie deserving a cause of greater devilry and stronger opponents. There is a tongue-in-cheek wit about the dialogue and direction that sometimes cracks the surface of mass market violence; but Lindsay Shonteff has been too sparing with the salt this time."
