= Linda Marlowe =

Australian-born English actress (born 1940)

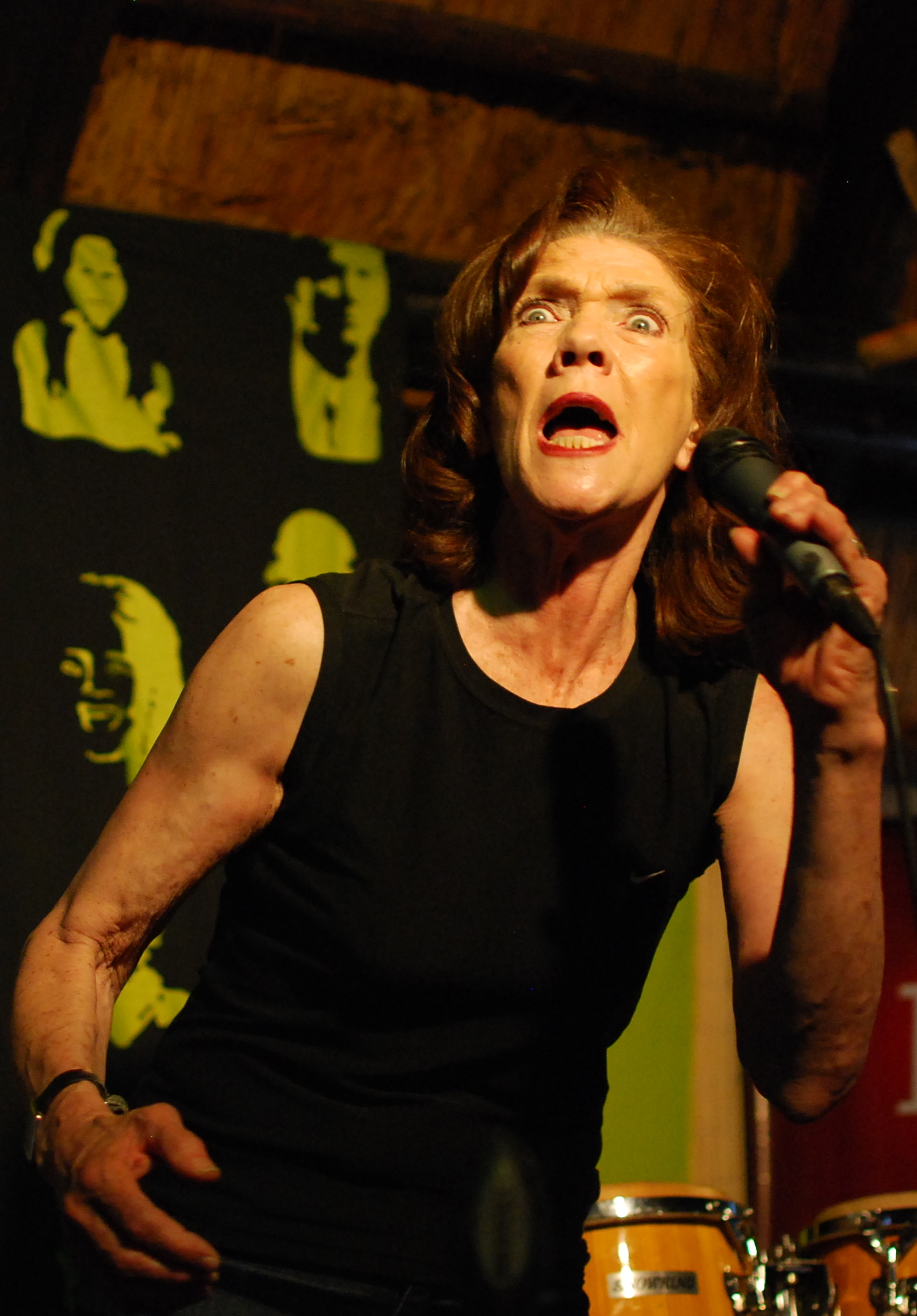
- Marlowe in 2010
- Born: Linda Virginia Bathurst; 26 July 1940 (age 86); Sydney, Australia
- Occupation: Actress
- Years active: 1960–present
- Television: EastEnders (2014–2017)
- Spouse: William Marlowe (1958–1967)
- Parent: Peter Bathurst

Linda Virginia Marlowe (née Bathurst; born 26 July 1940) is an Australian-born British film, theatre, and television actress. She is noted for her association with Steven Berkoff, performing in many of his theatrical works, creating a one-woman show based on his female characters called Berkoff's Women, and being referred to as his "muse" by a number of critics.

Marlowe's television roles include A small part in The Saint "The time to die" (1968) the 1995 Lynda La Plante series She's Out, and the recurring role of Sylvie Carter in EastEnders from December 2014 to March 2017. Her film credits include Impact (1963), Manifesto (1988), The House of Mirth (2000), Hellraiser: Deader (2005) and Tinker Tailor Soldier Spy (2011).

== Biography ==
Linda Virginia Bathurst was born on 26 July 1940 in Sydney, New South Wales, Australia, to English parents who decided to return to the United Kingdom when she was ten. She attended the Central School of Speech and Drama, and after leaving drama school at the age of 20, she was offered a leading role at the Connaught Theatre in Worthing. This was followed by further theatrical work in Birmingham and at the Gate Theatre in Dublin.

She performed in several productions at the Half Moon Theatre on Alie Street including Grand Larceny (1977); Dick Whittington, or The City of Fear (1977) and Greek (1980), which was one of many Steven Berkoff plays she performed in including, among others, Decadence, East, The Trial and Metamorphosis, for which she is internationally best known.

She played Osloo in the Doctor Who audio story, The Macros, written by actress Ingrid Pitt and Tony Rudlin.

Marlowe became a patron of Half Moon Theatre in autumn 2016.

== Selected filmography ==
- Impact (1963)
- That Kind of Girl (1963)
- The World Ten Times Over (1963)
- The Americanization of Emily (1964)
- Spaceflight IC-1 (1965)
- The Man Outside (1967)
- Night After Night After Night (1970)
- Dyn Amo (1972)
- Tam Lin (1970)
- Big Zapper (1973)
- The Swordsman (1974)
- Penelope Pulls It Off (1975)
- Mr. Love (1986)
- Manifesto (1988)
- The Green Man (1990)
- She's Out (1995)
- The Tenant of Wildfell Hall (1996)
- The House of Mirth (2000)
- Hellraiser: Deader (2005)
- Coronation Street (2008)
- Day of the Dead (2008) ... Francine Bowman
- “Not in My Backyard”, S13 of Midsomer Murders (2011), ... Fiona Conway
- Tinker Tailor Soldier Spy (2011)
- Houdini (2014)
- EastEnders as Sylvie Carter (2014–2017)
- Casualty (2018)
- The Lossen (2018)
- A Hymn for Her (2022)
