= Kurt Christian =

English actor

- Born: Baron Kurt Christian von Siegenberg; 1950 (age 75–76); British Hong Kong
- Occupations: Actor, producer
- Years active: 1954-present

Kurt Christian (born 1950) is an English actor. He is known for his main roles in two fantasy movies by Ray Harryhausen, as Haroun in The Golden Voyage of Sinbad (1973) and as Rafi in Sinbad and the Eye of the Tiger (1977).

Other notable movies that he starred in include Paper Tiger (1975), Pope Joan (1972) and Horror Hospital (1973).

== Filmography ==
- The Purple Plain (1954)
- Windom's Way (1957)
- Nine Hours to Rama (1963)
- The Long Duel (1967)
- Fragment of Fear (1970)
- The Last Valley (1971)
- Pope Joan (1972)
- Horror Hospital (1973)
- The Golden Voyage of Sinbad (1973)
- Paper Tiger (1975)
- Joseph Andrews (1977)
- Sinbad and the Eye of the Tiger (1977)
- The Time Crystal (1981)
- The Boys Next Door (1985)
