= The Yes Girls =

1972 British film by Lindsay Shonteff

- Film titles
- Directed by: Lindsay Shonteff
- Written by: Lindsay Shonteff
- Produced by: Lindsay Shonteff
- Starring: Sue Bond
- Cinematography: John C. Taylor
- Edited by: Jackson Bodell
- Music by: Alan Gorrie
- Production company: Lindsay Shonteff Film Productions Ltd.
- Release date: 1972
- Running time: 83 minutes
- Country: United Kingdom
- Language: English

The Yes Girls (also known as Take Some Girls, Excitement Girls and Pin-Up Girl) is a 1972 British low-budget sexploitation film directed, written and produced by Lindsay Shonteff and starring Sue Bond and Sally Muggeridge. A woman escapes from a school for delinquent girls and becomes involved with a lecherous porn director.

== Plot ==
Maria Carter has recently escaped from an approved school and in London meets aspiring actress Angela and her room-mate Caron. The three girls get parts in a low-budget sexploitation movie called Flesh in the Fields, which against all odds turns out to land Maria a Hollywood deal.

== Cast ==
- Sue Bond as Maria Carter
- Sally Muggeridge as Angela
- Felicity Oliver as Caron
- Ray Chiarella as Jack Shulton
- Jack May as King Reiter
- Jack Smethurst as Sam Hed
- Neville Barber as Production Manager
- Fred Hugh as Landlord
- Dennis Adams as Cohen
- Tony Edwards as Cameraman
- Toby Lenon as Gardener
- Anthony Jacobs as Clothes Shop Manager
- Denise Stafford as Mrs. Carter

== Critical reception ==
The Monthly Film Bulletin wrote: "A low budget sex movie about the making of a low budget sex movie. The 'Hollywood looks at Hollywood' formula has been adapted in an appropriately basic way and the humour relentlessly excavates every cliché. The producer grinds his teeth on an everlasting cigar over every item of expenditure, while his disconsolate director is ever eager to find an artistic angle, even when ordered to get a close-up of Maria's joggling, roly-poly charms. The three girls have, however, some genuine charm of their own and there is something horribly apt about the film-within-a-film they turn out – an ultimate in primitive nudie pics that looks like a titillating interlude from The Running, Jumping and Standing Still Film."
