= Paul Williamson (actor) =

British actor (born 1929)

- Born: Paul Williamson; 1929 (age 96–97); Hampstead, London, England
- Education: Royal Academy of Dramatic Art
- Occupation: Actor
- Spouse: Clare Welch (m. 1966; died 2019)

Paul Williamson (born 1929) is a British retired actor.

== Early life and career ==
Williamson was born in Hampstead, London in 1929. He had completed one year of training at the RADA when he was called up for National Service. After six weeks of initial training, he underwent training as a gunner in the Royal Artillery. Subsequently, he received a commission, extended his service for another year, and ultimately concluded as a Lieutenant. After his time as a soldier, Williamson resumed his studies at RADA, graduating in 1951. He worked as an actor for over 60 years.

== Personal life ==
In 1966, Williamson married Clare Welch (1935–2019), an actress. They were together for 53 years until Welch's death in 2019.

== Filmography ==
=== Film ===
Year	Title	Role	Type
1963	Return to Sender	Tony Shaw	Feature film
1964	The Runaway	Thomas	Feature film
1964	Delayed Flight	Shentor	Feature film
1972	Running Scared	John	Feature film
1973	Man at the Top	Tarrant	Feature film
1979	Yesterday's Hero	1st Club Director (uncredited)	Feature film
1981	Venom	Detective Sergeant Glazer	Feature film
1981	The Island of Adventure	M.I.5 Boss	Feature film
1983	On the Third Day	Douglas Hammond	Feature film
1988	The Accidental Tourist	London hotel manager	Feature film
1996	Emma	Footman	Feature film
1997	Shooting Fish	Weighing-In Official	Feature film
1999	The Rat Trap		Short
2001	All the Queen's Men	McCinley	Feature film
2007	12 in a Box	Bill	Feature film
2007	Namastey London	Mr. Brown	Feature film

=== Television ===
Year	Title	Role	Note
1955	The Adventures of the Scarlet Pimpernel	Chauvelin's Agent	Episode: "The Christmas Present"
1956-57	The Adventures of Sir Lancelot	Various	7 Episodes
1960	ITV Television Playhouse	Policeman	Episode: "Breakaway"
1966	The Man in Room 17	Nigel Hendy	Episode: "Where There's a Will"
1966	Redcap	Capt. Pears	Episode: "The Alibi"
1967	City '68	John Floyd	Episode: "The Appointment"
1968	George and the Dragon	Sgt. Hunter	Episode: "Court Case"
1968	Love Story	Larry	Episode: "The Vast Horizons of the Mind"
1971	Coronation Street	Mr. Stewart	2 Episodes
1971	The Rivals of Sherlock Holmes	Capt. Harris R.N.	Episode: "The Case of the Dixon Torpedo"
1972	Callan	Stafford	5 Episodes
1972	General Hospital	Mr. Crossan	Episode #1.16
1973	The Regiment	Major 'Bunty' Allen	Episode: "Ambush"
1973	The Adventurer	Superintendent	Episode: "The Case of the Poisoned Pawn"
1973	Harriet's Back in Town	David Duncan	2 Episodes
1973	Marked Personal	Robert Fowler	2 Episodes
1974	Special Branch	Bomb Expert	Episode: "Intercept"
1975	Public Eye	Counsel	Episode: "Fit of Conscience"
1976	Z-Cars	Curtis	Episode: "Kidnap"
