= The Green Man (TV serial) =

British TV series

- Genre: Supernatural, Drama
- Based on: The Green Man by Kingsley Amis
- Written by: Malcolm Bradbury
- Directed by: Elijah Moshinsky
- Starring: Albert Finney; Nicky Henson; Josie Lawrence; Michael Culver
- Composer: Tim Souster
- Country of origin: United Kingdom
- Original language: English
- No. of series: 1
- No. of episodes: 3

Production
- Producer: David Snodin
- Running time: 50 minutes
- Production company: A&E Television Productions for BBC

Original release
- Network: BBC1
- Release: 28 October – 11 November 1990

The Green Man is a three-part BBC TV adaptation of Kingsley Amis's 1969 novel of the same name, first broadcast on BBC1 from 28 October to 11 November 1990 and starring Albert Finney as the main character Maurice.

== Plot ==
Maurice Allington is the owner of "The Green Man", a country inn that he claims is haunted by ghosts. He is usually either frightening guests with his ghost stories, or trying to seduce them, but he slowly comes to realise that some of his stories may be true.

== Cast ==
- Albert Finney as Maurice
- Linda Marlowe as Joyce
- Sarah Berger as Diana
- Nicky Henson as Jack
- Josie Lawrence as Lucy
- Michael Grandage as Nick
- Natalie Morse as Amy
- Michael Culver as Underhill
- Robert Schofield as David
- Michael Hordern as Gramps
- Nickolas Grace as Sonnenscheim
- Sandra Caron as Mrs. Klinger
- Brian Greene as Mr. Klinger
- Anna Syke as Mrs. Underhill

== Production ==
=== Locations ===
The serial was filmed on location with West Dorset doubling as the Cambridgeshire area and Up Cerne Manor House (and possibly Dominey's Yard by Buckland Newton) representing The Green Man hotel and other exteriors.

== Reception ==
=== Awards ===
The series won the 1991 BAFTA for Best Original Television Music (by Tim Souster), Finney was nominated for Best Actor, and Masahiro Hirakubo was nominated for Best Film Editor.
