= Yesterday's Spy =

1975 book

Yesterday’s Spy
- First edition
- Author: Len Deighton
- Language: English
- Genre: Spy novel
- Publisher: Jonathan Cape
- Publication date: 1975
- Publication place: United Kingdom
- Media type: Print (hardcover and paperback)
- Preceded by: Spy Story (1972)
- Followed by: Twinkle, Twinkle, Little Spy (1976)

Yesterday’s Spy is a 1975 spy novel by British author Len Deighton. It is set in the post-World War II era, focusing on former resistance figures drawn back into the world of intelligence and rumours of clandestine activities.

== Plot ==
The novel follows Steve Champion, a flamboyant and wealthy businessman who once led an anti-Nazi intelligence network during the Second World War. Rumours have begun to circulate that Champion may still be involved in espionage and may be connected with clandestine arms dealings, including alleged contact with Arab arms dealers, raising concerns among British and American intelligence agencies.

To investigate these rumours, Champion's oldest wartime ally, often referred to as Charlie, is sent by British intelligence to the south of France to reopen Champion's file. Charlie's mission takes him from London and Wales to France and beyond, as he interviews former colleagues, wartime contacts, and individuals whose lives have been shaped by past conflicts. These encounters force Charlie to confront the complex interplay of past loyalties, present suspicions, and the moral ambiguity that lies at the heart of intelligence work.

As Charlie pieces together Champion's recent activities, he grapples with memories of the wartime resistance and reflects on how both men's lives have diverged since the war. Along the way, the investigation reveals shifting alliances, unresolved resentments, and the enduring cost of lives lived in shadows.

== Main characters ==
- Steve Champion: A charismatic and enigmatic former leader of the anti-Nazi Guernica network, now a businessman surrounded by rumours of espionage and clandestine dealings.
- Charlie: Champion's wartime comrade and the point-of-view character sent by British intelligence to investigate Champion’s current activities.

== Themes ==
Yesterday's Spy explores themes common in Cold War espionage fiction, including loyalty and betrayal, the psychological legacy of war, and the blurred lines between heroism and duplicity in intelligence work. The novel emphasizes character interaction and moral ambiguity over action-driven plot, with much of the tension deriving from interrogations, memory, and suspicion.

== Publication history ==
Yesterday's Spy was first published in 1975 by Jonathan Cape in the United Kingdom. The novel has since been reissued in various editions, including a 2021 paperback edition by Penguin as part of its Modern Classics series.

== Reception ==
Contemporary and later reviews of Yesterday's Spy have highlighted Deighton's craftsmanship and his ability to evoke postwar tensions through character and atmosphere. Some critics praise the novel's psychological depth and moral complexity, while others note that its slower, detail-oriented narrative differs from more action-driven thrillers.
