= No. 1 of the Secret Service =

1977 British film by Lindsay Shonteff

- Original US film poster
- Directed by: Lindsay Shonteff
- Written by: Lindsay Shonteff (as Howard Craig)
- Produced by: Elizabeth Gray
- Starring: Nicky Henson; Richard Todd; Aimi MacDonald; Geoffrey Keen; Sue Lloyd; Dudley Sutton; Jon Pertwee; Milton Reid
- Cinematography: Ivan Strasberg
- Edited by: John Luton
- Music by: Leonard Young
- Production company: Lindsay Shonteff Film Productions
- Distributed by: Hemdale Film Corporation
- Release date: 31 October 1977
- Running time: 91 minutes
- Country: United Kingdom
- Language: English

No. 1 of the Secret Service is a 1977 imitation James Bond film directed and written by Lindsay Shonteff and starring Nicky Henson as British secret agent Charles Bind. It was produced by Shonteff and his wife Elizabeth Gray. The film had the working title of 008 of the Secret Service. It was released on VHS under the title Her Majesty's Top Gun.

== Plot ==
Eccentric Arthur Loveday decides to do his bit for world peace by having influential financiers assassinated. With regular law enforcement agencies powerless to prevent their deaths, Her Majesty's Government sends in their top agent Charles Bind who is licensed to kill.

Loveday accomplishes his deeds through an organisation of mercenaries named K.R.A.S.H. (Killing Rape Arson Slaughter and Hit). Bind takes them on with his pair of .357 Magnum Smith & Wesson Model 66 revolvers and a .50 calibre M2 Browning machine gun for crowds.

== Cast ==
- Nicky Henson as No. 1 / Charles Bind
- Richard Todd as Arthur Loveday
- Aimi MacDonald as Anna Hudson
- Geoffrey Keen as Rockwell
- Dudley Sutton as K.R.A.S.H. leader
- Sue Lloyd as Sister Jane
- Jon Pertwee as The Rev. Walter Braithwaite
- Milton Reid as Eye Patch
- Jennifer Baker as Loveday's girl
- Susan Baker as Loveday's girl
- Fiona Curzon as bar girl
- Jenny Till as vampire girl
- Katya Wyeth as Miss Martin
- Oliver MacGreevy as Simms

== Production ==
In 1965, Canadian director Lindsay Shonteff directed and co-wrote Licensed to Kill, a low budget British made James Bond imitation/parody exploitation film. Produced by James Ward, it starred Tom Adams as Charles Vine imitating Sean Connery as James Bond. With the popularity of the mid-1960s spy movie craze, American producer Joseph E. Levine picked up the film for American and worldwide distribution. He retitled the film The Second Best Secret Agent in the Whole Wide World and added a new title song sung by Sammy Davis Jr.

The international success of the film led to producer Ward and Tom Adams reprising Charles Vine in two sequels; Where the Bullets Fly (1966) directed by John Gilling and presented by Levine and the 1967 made in Spain film Somebody's Stolen Our Russian Spy/O.K. Yevtushenko that languished in a vault until a release in the mid-1970s. Shonteff had nothing to do with those films.

With the continued popularity of the James Bond films starring Roger Moore in the mid-1970s, talk of Sean Connery reprising his 007 role in the planned James Bond of the Secret Service and the delay in the production of Eon Productions’ The Spy Who Loved Me, Shonteff thought he would return to the imitation James Bond field with his own film. The original title of 008 of the Secret Service was replaced by No. 1 of the Secret Service.

Perhaps to avoid rights difficulties with producer James Ward, Shonteff replaced the name of "Charles Vine" with "Charles Bind", that was also the name of one of the characters in Carry On Spying (1964). Bind was played by a fair haired Roger Moore imitator, Nicky Henson. Bind's M type superior Rockwell who was previously played by John Arnatt is now played by Geoffrey Keen who would later make appearances in several Bond films as the Minister of Defence.

With production beginning in October 1976, a sequel was announced during production entitled An Orchid for No. 1.

The sequel was not released until 1979 under the title Licensed to Love and Kill with Gareth Hunt replacing Nicky Henson who had signed with the Royal Shakespeare Company.

== Soundtrack ==
Simon Bell wrote and performed the theme song "Givin' It Plenty" that was also used in the first sequel Licensed to Love and Kill and reused in Tintorera (1977).

== Reception ==
The Monthly Film Bulletin wrote: "A good deal more violent but no less appealing than the Charles Vine James Bond spoofs of the Sixties, this knockabout spy picture returns to familiar territory. ...The censor is reported to have taken a dim view of the gratuitous murders of the KRASH training course and the flying limbs in the dockside massacre, and to have rejected the producers view that the repeated sight a lightly-clad Aimi Macdonald being doused with water (one of several over-worked running gags) was suitable viewing for under-fourteens. Nicky Henson is undoubtedly a more animated Bond substitute than Tom Adams, and Lindsay Shonteff hurries the proceedings along with a certain breathless verve. There remain, however, few signs of genuine life in this over-exploited old workhorse."

Alan Burton in Historical Dictionary of British Spy Fiction, which cites that "the cycle of spy films began to lose steam in the 1970s", and mentions No. 1 of the Secret Service and its sequel Licensed to Love and Kill as "the odd picture [that] turned up in the cinema schedules", refers to both films as "crude parodies".

== Sequels ==
- Licensed to Love and Kill (1979) starring Gareth Hunt
- Number One Gun (1990) starring Michael Howe
