= Jack May =

English actor (1922–1997)

- May in How I Won the War (1967)
- Born: Jack Wynne May; 23 April 1922; Henley-on-Thames, Oxfordshire, England
- Died: 19 September 1997 (aged 75); Hove, Sussex, England
- Occupation: Actor
- Years active: 1945–1996
- Spouse: Petra Davies (m. 1957)
- Children: 2

Jack Wynne May (23 April 1922 – 19 September 1997) was an English actor. He played William E. Simms in the cult classic TV series Adam Adamant Lives!, and provided voice work for productions such as the cartoon Count Duckula and the long-running BBC Radio soap opera The Archers, performing in the latter for forty five years.

== Early life and education ==
May was born in 1922 in Henley-on-Thames, and was educated at Forest School in Walthamstow. After war service with the Royal Indian Navy in British India, he was offered a place at RADA, but instead went to Merton College, Oxford. Here, with the OUDS, he played parts that included John of Gaunt in Richard II and Polonius in Hamlet.

== Career ==
May became familiar on television as the valet William E. Simms in two series of the BBC 1 fantasy/adventure television series Adam Adamant Lives! from 1966 to 1967.

He provided the voice for Igor, long-suffering butler to Count Duckula in the cartoon series of the same name. He also appeared as the waiter Garkbit in the television version of The Hitchhiker's Guide to the Galaxy, Théoden in the 1981 BBC Radio adaptation of The Lord of the Rings, as General Hermack in the 1969 Doctor Who serial The Space Pirates, and in Bachelor Father. For 45 years the long-running BBC Radio 4 series, The Archers, featured the voice of May as Nelson Gabriel, son of Walter Gabriel, making him (at the time of his death) the fourth-longest serving soap opera star in the world. He played the voice of Muzzy in Muzzy in Gondoland and Muzzy Comes Back.

His other credits in film and television included Dr. Denny in the 1960 serial The Citadel, the sex-crazed Judge in the horror film Night After Night After Night (1970), the District Commissioner in The Man Who Would Be King (1975), and the prosecuting naval attorney in The Bounty (1984).

On stage he played many leading and supporting roles, spending five years with Birmingham Repertory Theatre during which time he attracted considerable notice in the title part of Shakespeare's Henry VI. This trilogy of plays came to the Old Vic in London, and from then on began to be far more regularly revived. For Birmingham Rep, he also played parts as diverse as Richard II, Alec in Coward's Still Life (the story better known as Brief Encounter) and the Elephant in Obey's Noah. He returned to the Old Vic for the 1958–59 season, as Shakespeare's Julius Caesar among other parts. Later stage roles included The Headmaster in A Voyage Round My Father, and Colonel Pickering in Pygmalion with Alec McCowen and Diana Rigg.

== Personal life ==
May married actress Petra Davies in 1957. He died at 75, on 19 September 1997. He and his wife had two children.

== Partial filmography ==
- Gert and Daisy's Weekend (1942) as Old Man
- Give Me the Stars (1945) - Milkman (uncredited)
- The Oracle (1953) - Old Man
- Innocents in Paris (1953) - (uncredited)
- John Wesley (1954)
- Child's Play (1954) - Bob Crouch
- It's a Great Day (1955) - Nightwatchman (uncredited)
- Cat Girl (1957) - Richard Johnson
- The Silent Enemy (1958) - (uncredited)
- There Was a Crooked Man (1960) - Police Sergeant
- Seven Keys (1961) - Prison Officer (uncredited)
- Solo for Sparrow (1962) - Insp. Hudson
- The Traitors (1962) - Burton / 'The Traitor'
- Solo for Sparrow (1962) - MO
- A Funny Thing Happened on the Way to the Forum (1966) - Shopkeeper
- How I Won the War (1967) - Toby
- A Twist of Sand (1968) - Inspector Seekert
- Night After Night After Night (1969) - Judge Charles Lomax
- Goodbye, Mr. Chips (1969) - Price (uncredited)
- Trog (1970) - Dr. Selbourne
- The Yes Girls (1971) - King Reiter
- Big Zapper (1973) - Jeremiah Horn
- The Man Who Would Be King (1975) - District Commissioner
- The Seven-Per-Cent Solution (1976) - Dr. Schultz
- Sammy's Super T-Shirt (1978) - Sportsmaster
- A Horseman Riding By (1978) - Lord Gilroy
- The Return of the Soldier (1982) - Brigadier General
- The Bounty (1984) - Prosecuting Captain
- The Shooting Party (1985) - Sir Harry Stamp
- The Doctor and the Devils (1985) - Dr. Stevens
- Muzzy in Gondoland (1986) - Muzzy (voice actor)
- Count Duckula (1988-1993 - 47 episodes) - Igor (voice actor)
- Muzzy Comes Back (1989) - Muzzy (voice actor)
- Willie's War (1994) - Grandfather
