= Colin Skeaping =

English stuntman

- Born: Colin Peter Skeaping; 18 June 1944 (age 81); Colchester, Essex, England
- Occupations: Stuntman, actor

Colin Skeaping (born 18 June 1944) is a stuntman with a long career in Hollywood stunts. He was the stunt double for Mark Hamill's role as Luke Skywalker in all three original Star Wars films. He was also a stunt double in other noteworthy film series such as the James Bond and Superman movies.

== Career ==
=== Star Wars ===
Skeaping was Mark Hamill's stunt double for Star Wars, The Empire Strikes Back, and Return of the Jedi. In addition to his stunt work, he also played a Death Star trooper in Star Wars and a gunner for the second Death Star in Return of the Jedi.

=== James Bond ===
Skeaping performed stunts in the James Bond films Live and Let Die, The Spy Who Loved Me, and Octopussy. He also played Monorail Driver in The Spy Who Loved Me.

=== Superman ===
Skeaping was a stunt performer in the three first Superman films. He also played the pilot of the Bell Jetranger helicopter that crashes atop the Daily Planet building in the first Superman film, causing Superman to reveal himself to save Lois Lane.

== Selected filmography ==
=== Films ===
Colin Skeaping was a stunt performer unless otherwise mentioned.

- Horror Hospital (1973) as Bike Boy #2
- Live and Let Die (1973)
- The Spy Who Loved Me (1977) stunt performer / Monorail Driver (uncredited)
- Star Wars Episode IV: A New Hope (1977) as Mark Hamill's stunt double / Death Star trooper (uncredited)
- The Stick Up (1977) as Fairground Performer
- Star Wars Episode V: The Empire Strikes Back (1980)
- Star Wars Episode VI: Return of the Jedi (1983) as Mark Hamill's stunt double / Death Star II gunner
- Superman: The Movie (1978) as stunt performer / Pilot
- Superman II (1980)
- The Great Muppet Caper (1981)
- Superman III (1983)
- Octopussy (1983)
- Top Secret! (1984) as Soufflé (Resistance Member) (uncredited)
- Indiana Jones and the Temple of Doom (1984)
- Return to Oz (1985) as Wheeler
- Batman (1989)
- Split Second (1992) as Drunk
