= Donald Bull =

Australian rugby union player

- Born: Donald E. C. Bull

Rugby union career
- Position: centre
International career
Years	Team	Apps	(Points)
1928	Wallabies	1	(0)

Donald E. C. Bull was a rugby union player who represented Australia.

Bull, a centre, claimed 1 international rugby cap for Australia.
