= Lindsay Shonteff =

Canadian film director (1935–2006)

- Born: Lindsay Craig Shonteff; November 5, 1935; Toronto, Ontario, Canada
- Died: March 11, 2006 (aged 70); Reading, England
- Occupation(s): Screenwriter, Film producer

Lindsay Craig Shonteff (5 November 1935 – 11 March 2006) was a Canadian born film director, film producer and screenwriter who achieved fame for low-budget films produced in the United Kingdom.

== Biography ==
Lindsay Shonteff was born in Toronto, Ontario and made his directing, producing, editing and screenwriting debut in 1959 with a Canadian made Western The Hired Gun/The Last Gunfighter that he edited in his own home. After the film's release, Shonteff went to England following his friend and fellow Canadian Sidney J. Furie.

Shonteff's debut in Britain was Devil Doll (1964); Furie was originally scheduled to direct, but was offered a more prestigious film and recommended Shonteff. Richard Gordon said Furie advised Shonteff throughout the making of the film. Shonteff had to cut the horror tale of a ventriloquist's dummy for an X rating from the British Board of Film Censors.

This film led to interest from Columbia Pictures for a contract but Shonteff argued over the matter and the contract did not come through.

Shonteff then filmed the "African horror adventure" Curse of Simba (aka Curse of the Voodoo) in 1965 for Gordon.

The same year, he co-wrote and directed a James Bond type film for producer S.J.H. "James" Ward, Licensed to Kill. The film was picked up for American and international release by Joseph E. Levine; it was re-edited and retitled The Second Best Secret Agent in the Whole Wide World. Reportedly Shonteff was offered a contract by 20th Century Fox but disagreed on conditions.

Shonteff collaborated again with Ward on Run with the Wind in 1966. He then directed Harry Alan Towers's The Million Eyes of Sumuru in 1967.

In 1969, Shonteff directed the rarely seen crime film Clegg, followed in 1970 by the horror film Night After Night After Night and the cult film Permissive which explored the world of groupies. In addition, Shonteff directed the 1971 sex drama The Yes Girls and the rarely seen crime thriller The Fast Kill in 1972. He then directed the cult exploitation film Big Zapper in 1973, and its sequel, The Swordsman, the following year.

With the publicity battle between the rival James Bonds of Albert R. Broccoli (The Spy Who Loved Me) and Kevin McClory (the projected James Bond of the Secret Service) in 1977, Shonteff returned to the secret agent fold with No. 1 of the Secret Service (originally titled 008 of the Secret Service). He followed this with Licensed to Love and Kill (1979) and Number One Gun (1990). He also directed a film adaptation of Len Deighton's Spy Story in 1976.

== Later life and death ==
Shonteff's later work included How Sleep the Brave, a Vietnam War project, filmed in England in 1981.

Shonteff died on the last day of production of his final film Angels, Devils, and Men.

When he died, he was married to his wife of over 44 years, Christina Shonteff.

== Filmography ==
Year	Title	Notes
1961	The Hired Gun	
1964	Devil Doll	
1965	Curse of Simba	Also known as: Curse of the Voodoo and Voodoo Blood Death
1965	Licensed to Kill	
1966	Run with the Wind	
1967	The Million Eyes of Sumuru	
1969	Night After Night After Night	Credited as Lewis J. Force
1970	Clegg	Also known as The Bullet Machine
1970	Permissive	
1971	The Yes Girls	Credited as Anton Schiller
1972	The Fast Kill	
1973	Big Zapper	
1974	The Swordsman	
1976	Spy Story	
1977	No. 1 of the Secret Service	
1979	Licensed to Love and Kill	
1982	How Sleep the Brave	Credited as Lyndon James Swift
1984	The Killing Edge	
1984	Lipstick and Blood	Credited as Robert Bauer
1990	Number One Gun	
1992	The Running Gun	
2004	Ice Cold in Phoenix	Direct-to-video
2009	Angels, Devils and Men	
