= Muzzy Comes Back =

- Also known as: Muzzy 2 Muzzy Level II
- Written by: Wendy Harris; Richard Taylor; Joe Hambrook
- Directed by: Richard Taylor
- Starring: Jack May; Willie Rushton; Miriam Margolyes; Susan Sheridan; Derek Griffiths; Benjamin Whitrow; Peter Jones
- Theme music composer: Peter Shade
- Country of origin: United Kingdom
- Original language: English

Production
- Production company: Richard Taylor Cartoon Films

Original release
- Network: BBC
- Release: 1989

Related
- Muzzy in Gondoland

Muzzy Comes Back (also known as Muzzy 2 and Muzzy Level II) is a sequel to the animated direct-to-video film Muzzy in Gondoland, created by the BBC in 1989, as a way of teaching English as a second language. It has been adapted, using changed text in speaking and subtitles, for teaching other languages, such as German.

== Plot ==
Muzzy, the friendly metal and machine-eating extraterrestrial, returns for more adventures with his friends in the Kingdom of Gondoland. Everyone expects him, and King Nigel and Queen Eliza decide to arrange a ball for the christening of Bob and Sylvia's new baby daughter and their granddaughter, Princess Amanda. Meanwhile, Corvax, Nigel's former vizier and the villain of the previous film, who was demoted to menial labour for his failure to stop his computer from producing Sylvia clones and left Nigel trapped in it when he tried to stop it himself, invents an invisibility device. With his assistant Thimbo "the Terrible", a thief on parole, he schemes to kidnap Amanda so he can get revenge on Bob for when he stopped Corvax from escaping after the events with the Sylvia clones and taking Sylvia away from him.

Corvax and Thimbo succeed in kidnapping Amanda, and they get away on Nigel's yacht. However, Amanda sinks the boat by pulling the plug out of the hull. The three survive and enter Corvax's hideout: a small hut, which turns out to be Corvax's operations centre, hidden in a mountainside cave. Meanwhile, Muzzy, Nigel, Eliza, Bob, and Sylvia follow Corvax's trail, recover Nigel's yacht, and track Corvax to his hideout. During this time, Muzzy falls ill due to hunger since he had not eaten any clocks or other metal/mechanical items, so Bob calls Nigel and Eliza and has them retrieve a supply of them from Muzzy's flying saucer, along with a black box that Muzzy uses to identify Corvax's lair, and with directions from a farmer, they are able to locate it (Even Eliza, who gets help going between the rocks after trying to squeeze through herself.).

In the hideout, Amanda gets hungry and wants to eat; while preparing the food, Thimbo lets the invisibility device loose; it is picked up by Amanda, who activates it. Corvax and Thimbo struggle to find Amanda due to how they lost the other invisibility device back in the river when Amanda sunk the yacht. Muzzy, Nigel, Bob, Eliza, and Sylvia enter the hideout and confront Corvax. Thimbo confesses to Nigel that the hut is an operations centre. Meanwhile, Amanda is found, but cannot be seen. Muzzy constructs another invisibility device using parts from Corvax's lair and his technological expertise, and uses it to make Amanda visible. Everyone then goes back to the palace. In the end, Corvax and Thimbo ride with sheep to receive the unknown ultimate punishment offscreen (although it is accordingly known that, in Britain, this means 250 years in prison, essentially a life imprisonment). As for Muzzy, Bob, Sylvia, Nigel, Eliza, and Amanda, they are able to enjoy the party as they originally intended to do.

As in the first film, a bicycle-riding human named Norman is the star of a series of skits that periodically interrupt the main story to teach the viewers how to say certain things in different languages as they relate to the scenes they follow. These skits have more continuity than they do in the first film as Norman struggles to build a new home throughout them after his old home falls apart.

== Cast ==
- Jack May as Muzzy, a furry, greenish-blue extraterrestrial who eats metallic and mechanical objects; and Norman's friend and fellow human

- Willie Rushton as King Nigel, the lion ruler of Gondoland and Sylvia's father; and additional voices
- Miriam Margolyes as Queen Eliza, Nigel's rat wife and Sylvia's mother; Norman's unnamed human wife; and the bulldog Servant Maid
- Susan Sheridan as Princess Sylvia, Nigel and Elza's rat daughter and Amanda's mother; Amanda, Sylvia and Bob's daughter; and additional voices
- Derek Griffiths as Bob, Sylvia's mouse husband and Amanda's father; Corvax, a green goblin mad scientist and Nigel's former vizier; and additional voices
- Peter Jones as Thimbo the Terrible, Corvax's bulldog assistant; Guest #1, a mouse; and the Shepherd, a pink goblin
- Benjamin Whitrow as Norman, a human bicyclist

== Credits ==
- Directed by Richard Taylor
- Executive Producer: Joe Hambrook
- Original English Scripts by Wendy Harris, Joe Hambrook, Richard Taylor
- Language Course Designer: Diana Webster
- Animation by Richard Taylor Cartoon Films Ltd.
- Additional animation by Bob Godfrey Films Ltd.
- Music by Peter Shade
- Produced by Richard Taylor Cartoon Films for BBC English Television
