= Richard Gordon (film producer) =

Film producer (1925–2011)

- Born: Richard Gordon; 31 December 1925; London, England
- Died: 1 November 2011 (aged 85); Manhattan, New York City
- Occupations: Film producer, executive producer
- Years active: 1953–2011

Richard Gordon (31 December 1925 – 1 November 2011) was a British-born producer and financier of horror films.

== Career ==
As a youth, Gordon displayed a love of films from an early age. While he was in school, he wrote articles on the subject, edited fan club magazines, and organized a film society. His entry into the industry was delayed by a period of service in the British Royal Navy, from 1944 through 1946.

In 1947, Gordon and his brother Alex moved to New York City. Two years later, at the age of 23, Gordon set up his own company, Gordon Films, a distributor of imported films in the United States. He produced twice for Boris Karloff, and later worked with Antony Balch on two exploitation films. His last two films were The Cat and the Canary (1979) and Inseminoid (1981).

With writer Tom Weaver, he can be heard on the DVD commentary tracks for eight of his films: The Haunted Strangler, Fiend Without a Face, First Man into Space, Corridors of Blood, Devil Doll, Secrets of Sex, Horror Hospital and The Cat and the Canary. Weaver wrote The Horror Hits of Richard Gordon, a book-long interview published by BearManor Media in 2011. Gordon's brother, Alex Gordon, produced exploitation films for American International Pictures in the 1950s.

Gordon died at New York-Presbyterian Hospital on 1 November 2011, at age 85. He had been suffering from heart problems for several months.
