= Geoffrey Keen =

English actor (1916–2005)

- Born: Geoffrey Ian Keen; 21 August 1916; Wallingford, Berkshire, England
- Died: 3 November 2005 (aged 89); Northwood, London, England
- Occupation: Actor
- Years active: 1943–1991
- Spouse(s): Doris Groves (1960–1989; her death); Hazel Terry (divorced); Madeline Howell (divorced)
- Children: 2

Geoffrey Keen (21 August 1916 – 3 November 2005) was an English actor who appeared in supporting roles in many films. He is well known for playing British Defence Minister Sir Frederick Gray in the James Bond films.

== Biography ==
=== Early life ===
Keen was born in Wallingford, then Berkshire, later Oxfordshire, England, the son of stage actor Malcolm Keen. He was educated at Bristol Grammar School. He then joined the Little Repertory Theatre in Bristol for whom he made his stage debut in 1932. After a year in repertory he stayed for a year in Cannes before being accepted for a place at the London School of Economics. In a last-minute change of mind, he entered the Royal Academy of Dramatic Art, where he won the Bancroft Gold Medal after only one year. In 1939, he had just joined the company at Stratford's Shakespeare Memorial Theatre when World War II started. Keen enlisted in the Royal Army Medical Corps, though also managed to appear in an Army instructional film for Carol Reed.

=== Career ===
Keen made his full film debut in 1946 in Riders of the New Forest but soon appeared in better known films for Reed such as Odd Man Out (1947), The Fallen Idol (1948) The Third Man (1949) and Walt Disney's Treasure Island (1950). He quickly became one of the busiest character actors, typically doing five films a year. He also continued to perform on stage, for instance as Iachimo in Peter Hall's 1957 production of Cymbeline, and a sadistic Turkish General in Terence Rattigan's controversial play Ross (1960).

Keen was cast mainly as establishment figures, including government ministers, senior police officers and military figures, though he also appeared in working class roles in Chance of a Lifetime (1950) and Millions Like Us (1943). He often portrayed balding, cold-hearted, and sarcastic executives or lawyers. On television, he was one of the leads in BBC TV's long-running drama about the oil industry, The Troubleshooters, between 1965 and 1972.

On the big screen, he played the role of Minister of Defence Sir Frederick Gray in six James Bond films between 1977 and 1987:

- The Spy Who Loved Me
- Moonraker
- For Your Eyes Only
- Octopussy
- A View to a Kill
- The Living Daylights

He also appeared in The Spanish Gardener, Doctor Zhivago, Born Free and Cromwell, as well as in numerous TV programmes. He even appeared in a leading role in the Hammer horror film Taste the Blood of Dracula that starred Christopher Lee. In all, Keen had appeared in 100 films before he retired in 1991.

== Filmography ==
=== Film ===
- The New Lot (1943) as Corporal (uncredited)
- Odd Man Out (1947) as Soldier (uncredited)
- Riders of the New Forest (1948) as Mr. Rivers
- The Fallen Idol (1948) as Detective Davis
- It's Hard to Be Good (1948) as Sergeant Todd
- The Small Back Room (1949) as Pinker
- The Third Man (1949) as British Military Policeman (uncredited)
- Chance of a Lifetime (1950) as Bolger
- Treasure Island (1950) as Israel Hands
- Seven Days to Noon (1950) as Alf
- The Clouded Yellow (1950) as Police Inspector
- Cheer the Brave (1951) as Wilson
- Green Grow the Rushes (1951) as Spencer Prudhoe
- High Treason (1951) as Morgan Williams
- Cry, the Beloved Country (1951) as Father Vincent
- His Excellency (1952) as Morellos
- Hunted (1952) as Detective Inspector Deakin
- Angels One Five (1952) as Station Personnel: Company Sergeant Major
- Lady in the Fog (1952) as Christopher Hampden
- The Long Memory (1953) as Craig
- Genevieve (1953) as Policeman
- Turn the Key Softly (1953) as Mr. Gregory
- Malta Story (1953) as British Soldier (uncredited)
- Rob Roy: The Highland Rogue (1953) as Killeran
- Meet Mr Lucifer (1953) as Mr. Lucifer (voice)
- Face the Music (1954) as Maurie Green
- The Maggie (1954) as Campbell
- Doctor in the House (1954) as Dean
- The Divided Heart (1954) as Marks
- Carrington V.C. (1954) as President
- The Awakening (1954) as The Supervisor
- The Glass Cage (1955) as Harry Stanton
- Passage Home (1955) as Ike the bosun
- Doctor at Sea (1955) as Hornbean
- Storm Over the Nile (1955) as Dr. Sutton
- Portrait of Alison (1955) as Inspector Colby
- A Town Like Alice (1956) as Noel Strachan
- The Man Who Never Was (1956) as Gen. Archibald Nye
- The Long Arm (1956) as Chief Superintendent Malcolm
- Yield to the Night (1956) as Prison Chaplain
- Loser Takes All (1956) as Reception Clerk
- Sailor Beware! (1956) as Rev. Mr. Purefoy
- House of Secrets (1956) as Col. Burleigh, CIA
- Zarak (1956) as Carruthers (uncredited)
- The Spanish Gardener (1956) as Dr. Harvey
- Town on Trial (1957) as Charles Dixon
- The Secret Place (1957) as Mr. Haywood
- Fortune Is a Woman (1957) as Michael Abercrombie aka Young Abercrombie
- Doctor at Large (1957) as Second Examiner
- The Scamp (1957) as Headmaster
- The Birthday Present (1957) as Col. Wilson
- Nowhere to Go (1958) as Inspector Scott
- Web of Evidence (1959) as Prison Governor
- Horrors of the Black Museum (1959) as Supt. Graham
- Deadly Record (1959) as Supt. Ambrose
- The Boy and the Bridge (1959) as Bridge Master
- The Scapegoat (1959) as Gaston
- Devil's Bait (1959) as Joe Frisby
- The Dover Road Mystery (1960) as Superintendent Graham
- The Malpas Mystery (1960) as Torrington
- Sink the Bismarck! (1960) as Assistant Chief of the Naval Staff
- The Angry Silence (1960) as Davis
- The Silent Weapon (1961) Scotland Yard (film series) as Superintendent Carter
- No Love for Johnnie (1961) as The Prime Minister – Reginald Stevens
- Spare the Rod (1961) as Arthur Gregory
- Raising the Wind (1961) as Sir John
- A Matter of WHO (1961) as Foster
- The Inspector (1962) as Commissioner Bartels
- The Spiral Road (1962) as Willem Wattereus
- Live Now – Pay Later (1962) as Reggie Corby
- Return to Sender (1962) as Robert Lindley
- The Mind Benders (1963) as Calder
- Torpedo Bay (1963) as Hodges
- The Cracksman (1963) as Magistrate
- Dr. Syn, Alias the Scarecrow (1963) as General Pugh
- The Heroes of Telemark (1965) as General Bolt
- Doctor Zhivago (1965) as Prof. Boris Kurt
- Born Free (1966) as Kendall
- Berserk! (1967) as Commissioner Dalby
- Thunderbird 6 (1968) as James Glenn (voice)
- Taste the Blood of Dracula (1970) as William Hargood
- Cromwell (1970) as John Pym
- Sacco e Vanzetti (1971) as Judge Webster Thayer
- Doomwatch (1972) as Sir Henry Leyton
- Living Free (1972) as Kendall
- QB VII (1974) as Magistrate Griffin
- The Spy Who Loved Me (1977) as Sir Frederick Gray
- No. 1 of the Secret Service (1977) as Rockwell
- Holocaust 2000 (1977) as Gynecologist
- Moonraker (1979) as Sir Frederick Gray
- Licensed to Love and Kill (1979) as Stockwell
- For Your Eyes Only (1981) as Sir Frederick Gray
- Rise and Fall of Idi Amin (1981) as British Ambassador
- Octopussy (1983) as Sir Frederick Gray
- A View to a Kill (1985) as Sir Frederick Gray
- The Living Daylights (1987) as Sir Frederick Gray (final film role)

== Television ==
- The Adventures of Robin Hood – episode – The Wager (1956) – Blind Beggar
- The Men from Room 13 – episodes -The Man Who Sold Romance Part 1 (1959)–The Man Who Sold Romance Part 2 (1959) as Fred Anderson
- Hancock (1963 TV series) ('The Man on the Corner' episode) (1963) as Colonel Beresford
- Death in Ecstasy in 1964 as Inspector Roderick Alleyn, based on the Ngaio Marsh novel
- The Saint – episode – The Saint Steps In (1964) – Hobart QuennelThe Man Who sold Romance Part 1
- The Persuaders! – season 1, episode 12 (1972) as Thaddeus Krane
- The Troubleshooters - main cast - 1965-72 - Brian Stead
- The Venturers - main cast - (1975) – Gerald Lang
- Return of the Saint – episode – The Debt Collectors (1978) – Sir Charles
- Lady Killers – episode – Killing Mice (1980) – Mr. Fulton
