= Secrets of Sex =

1970 British film by Antony Balch

- DVD Cover
- Directed by: Antony Balch
- Written by: Antony Balch; Martin Locke; John Eliot; Maureen Owen; Elliott Stein
- Produced by: Antony Balch; Richard Gordon
- Starring: Valentine Dyall; Cathy Howard; Maria Frost; Yvonne Quenet; Sue Bond; Kenneth Benda; Mike Briton
- Cinematography: David McDonald
- Edited by: John Rushton
- Music by: De Wolfe
- Production company: Noteworthy Films
- Distributed by: Antony Balch
- Release date: February 1970 (UK)
- Running time: 85 min.
- Country: United Kingdom
- Language: English
- Budget: £32,000

Secrets of Sex, released in the US as Tales of the Bizarre and Bizarre, is a 1970 British multi-genre sexploitation anthology film, directed by Antony Balch and narrated by Valentine Dyall. It was written by Martin Locke, John Eliot, Maureen Owen, Elliott Stein and Balch.

== Plot ==
The film comprises a set of episodes, each featuring recurring sexual themes depicting the battle of the sexes, and introduced by an Egyptian mummy voiced by Valentine Dyall.

== Cast ==
- Valentine Dyall as the mummy (narration)
- Richard Schulman as the judge
- Janet Spearman as the judge's wife
- Dorothy Grumbar as the photographer
- Anthony Rowlands as the model
- Norma Eden as the photographer's assistant
- George Herbert as the steward
- Kenneth Benda as Sacha Seremona
- Yvonne Quenet as Mary-Clare
- Reid Anderson as Dr. Rilke
- Sylvia Delamere as the nurse
- Cathy Howard as the cat burglar
- Mike Briton as the burgled man
- Maria Frost as Lindy Leigh
- Peter Carlisle as Colonel X
- Steve Preston as Philpott
- Graham Burrows as the military attache
- Sue Bond as the call girl
- Laurelle Streeter as the lady in the greenhouse
- Bob E. Raymond as the lady in the greenhouse's new valet
- Mike Patten as 1st flicker flashback boy
- Raymond George as 2nd flicker flashback boy
- Karrie Lambert as 1st flicker flashback lady
- Joyce Leigh Crossley as 2nd flicker flashback lady
- Nicola Austin as the flicker flashback girl
- Elliott Stein as the strange young man / the mummy

== Production ==
After directing the Burroughs-influenced shorts Towers Open Fire (1963) and The Cut Ups (1967), Balch approached producer Richard Gordon in 1968 to direct an anthology film running just over an hour and entitled Multiplication.

Five writers are credited with the screenplay; several others, including Brion Gysin and Ian Cullen (writer of Cruel Passion (1977) and husband of Yvonne Quenet) also claimed to have worked on the script. After the script was rewritten to bring the film up to feature length and the budget doubled (£32,000) filming took place over 14 weeks in 1969.

Many of the actresses who appear nude in the film, such as Cathy Howard and Maria Frost, were topless models who had begun to get minor acting roles in British sex and horror films of the period. Frost, who plays Lindy Leigh in the film, was so horrified she'd been given a major role in the film that she reportedly told Balch "I'm a model, I can't act." She had previously appeared in the two Harrison Marks shorts Maria and Scouts Honour.

The dinosaur sculptures that feature in the "Strange Young Man" segment are the famous Crystal Palace Dinosaurs.

Commenting on the film in an unpublished 1975 interview, Balch claimed "this is a very uneven film, but three episodes and a single shot, are good. I liked the ones with the photographer, Elliot Stein, and the Lady in the Greenhouse. The episode of the monster baby is a bore, but the single shot of it, at the end is brilliant."

== Release ==
Released in February 1970, it was a huge success in the UK, running for six months at the Jacey Cinema in Piccadilly Circus alone, during which time it recouped its entire production cost. The film remained in circulation in the UK throughout the 1970s, sometimes appearing in a half hour edited version that played on the second half of double-bills.

== Censorship history ==
The film was substantially cut for the British cinema release in 1970, with censor John Trevelyan removing around six minutes from the film, while reportedly muttering "nasty stuff". Heavily cut was the "Spanish horse/Female photographer" sequence, together with assorted orgy and sex scenes, a bathroom striptease sequence and shots of strippers being pelted with tomatoes, while shots of men in bed together in the "Bedroom Beauties of 1929" sequence were removed entirely.

Writing in The Monthly Film Bulletin Jan Dawson remarked of the cuts: "paradoxically, the bowdlerized version of the film moves closer to pornography than the version from which its audience is being protected. ... it's sad that censorship should function against its own long term purpose and re-enforce the man-in-the-mac's sexual furtiveness by denying him the chance to view sex irreverently."

The film was briefly released uncut in America under the name Bizarre by New Line Cinema, before being withdrawn and re-released in 1972 as Tales of the Bizarre, a drastically re-edited version that deleted around 17 minutes from the film. The 1980 UK video release on the Iver Film Services label is uncut, as are the 2005 American DVD and the 2009 British DVD.

== Critical reception ==
Monthly Film Bulletin wrote: "[A]n exploitation sex film informed throughout by the refreshing view that sex is less often fun than funny ... (the stories) create a hilarious effect because of the discrepancy between their own unflinching seriousness and the ludicrousness of the pet theories they expound."

Sight and Sound wrote: "One has to make allowances for the tiny budget, inexperienced cast and the inexorable effect of time on what was once considered raunchily risqué, but the feature debut of legendary distributor/exhibitor/William S. Burroughs collaborator Antony Balch is so far ahead of the dismal 1970s British softcore norm that it's hard to credit it's from the same milieu. Spellbindingly bonkers from its opening scene, which establishes an ancient mummy as the onscreen narrator (with Valentine Dyall's sonorous voice), it's a series of vignettes by turns sexy, horrific and/or flat-out demented, with nods to comic-strip spy thrillers and silent slapstick, and memorably perverse touches like the meal of bloodily rare steak and lychees enjoyed by a couple of torture fetishists during a break in their photo session."

In Cinefantasique, John R. Duvoli called the film "superior to the run-of-the-mill sex cheapie and worthy of attention," writing: "Not all the episodes work that well. Director Antony Balch, a thirty-two year old former experimental filmmaker (Towers Open Fire etc.) in his first feature, seems more adept at building his tales than bringing them to a satisfactory conclusion. ... Special mention goes to DeWolfe's music score and David McDonald's photography. Valentine Dyall, who achieved fame as radio's wartime "Man in Black" is our narrator, and his resounding voice is put to good use. Acting standouts are Mr. Stein, Maria Frost and Cathy Howard."

== Home media ==
In 2005, the film was released as a special edition DVD by Synapse Films under its American title, Bizarre. In January 2010, the film, under its original title, was finally released on DVD in the UK by Odeon Entertainment, featuring new sleeve-notes by author Simon Sheridan.
