= Muzzy in Gondoland =

1986 film

- Directed by: Richard Taylor
- Written by: Wendy Harris; Richard Taylor; Joe Hambrook
- Starring: Jack May; Willie Rushton; Miriam Margolyes; Susan Sheridan; Derek Griffiths; Benjamin Whitrow
- Music by: Peter Shade
- Production company: Richard Taylor Cartoon Films
- Release date: 1986
- Running time: 71 minutes
- Country: United Kingdom
- Language: English

Muzzy in Gondoland (often shortened to simply Muzzy) is a British animated direct-to-video film, first created by the BBC in 1986, as a way of teaching English as a second language. The English version of the film features the voices of Willie Rushton, Miriam Margolyes, Susan Sheridan, Derek Griffiths, Jack May, and Benjamin Whitrow.

DMP Organization later acquired the rights to Muzzy and translated it into other languages (see below). It is unknown, however, who plays whom in the various dubbed versions of the film.

A sequel, Muzzy Comes Back, was released in 1989.

Digital Education developed a new version of the course, which was released in 2013. The 2013 version is CGI and is close to a shot-for-shot remake of the original film, but some changes have been made, e.g. The queen is very fat and is identified as such in the original version, these instances are removed and the Queen is slimmed down in the CGI version. She was also absent from the initial montage where the main cast describe themselves with a single word, except when she comments on the members.

== Plot ==
Muzzy, a large, bear-like extraterrestrial creature with greenish-blue fur who eats clocks and other metal and mechanical objects, arrives from outer space to visit Gondoland, which is ruled over by an unnamed king (retroactively named Nigel) and queen (retroactively named Eliza). Their daughter is Princess Sylvia; Bob is their gardener; and Corvax is a scientist serving as the royal vizier. Bob and Sylvia are secretly in love and decide to get married. However, Corvax, who also loves Sylvia, sees what is happening, and informs the King and Queen. Angered, the King pursues and catches them. The King orders that Bob be sent to prison, while Sylvia is taken back to the Palace.

Bob shares a cell with Muzzy, who tells him that he has been imprisoned for eating parking meters. Realising Muzzy's unusual diet, (Note: See also: Michel Lotito, a real-world case.) Bob encourages Muzzy to eat the bars of the prison cell window, and they escape. Back at the palace, Corvax tries flirting with Sylvia, but she angrily protests that she loves Bob. Crestfallen, Corvax uses his computer to clone Sylvia, but the duplicate hates him just as much as the original. Furious, Corvax strikes his computer, causing it to glitch and produce five more duplicates who roam around the palace before the computer explodes from the damage Corvax wrought on it in his anger.

Bob returns to the Palace with Muzzy, where they find the real Sylvia in the palace gardens. She tells them to hide in the shed and wait for her to bring them food there. Sylvia fakes a headache so her parents won't suspect anything. However, they encounter the healthy clones doing various activities at the same time. Back in the computer lab, Corvax attempts to recall the six duplicates of Sylvia, but the computer malfunctions due to the damage it sustained earlier and begins to infinitely produce Sylvia clones. Before long, hundreds of duplicates are swarming the palace. Down on the ground floor, the King notices that the Sylvia duplicates are coming from Corvax's room and decides to investigate. Seeing that Corvax cannot stop the computer, the King decides to fix it himself. He pulls some wires attached to the computer, which stops the process but sucks him inside the computer, despite Corvax's pleas not to do it, fearful of the consequences. Not knowing how to save the King, Corvax panics and attempts to escape by helicopter to save his own neck, with Bob in pursuit, after the Queen discovers what happened and ordered Corvax captured.

Sylvia and Muzzy enter the computer lab, and Muzzy releases the King from inside the machine after doing a little rewiring of it due to his technological expertise, much to the Queen and Sylvia's gratitude. Bob then returns with Corvax, and Bob is proven innocent, while Corvax is arrested by the King's Guard to pay for his crimes. Bob and Sylvia are reunited; by now, the King's hostile feelings towards the couple have dissolved. Muzzy reprograms the computer to send all of the Sylvia duplicates back inside it. Bob and Sylvia get married, while Corvax is given penal labour in the form of clock duty. Muzzy leaves Gondoland in his flying saucer, while the King thanks him for his help and hopes that he will return one day.

=== Norman skits ===
During the film, a bicyclist named Norman is the star of a series of skits, teaching the viewers how to say certain things in different languages.

- Near the beginning where everyone is introduced, Norman greets the King as he passes by, then enters the Big Ben and pops out to greet the viewers depending on the time. After he leaves for home in the evening, he, the Sun and the Moon bid each other and the viewers goodnight.
- When Sylvia gets food for Bob, Norman goes to a restaurant and orders food items from the waiter, all of which are thrown at him from offscreen. He is ultimately soaked when he asks for a wash.
- When Bob is overwhelmed by Corvax telling him to count all the flowers in the palace garden, Norman stops his bicycle at a fork in the road and does not know which way to go.
- During "The Big Muzzy Story", Norman, his unnamed wife, and Corvax's pet cat talk about the word "what" by identifying close-up objects.
- While Muzzy tries to get food, Norman and Corvax talk about "this" and "that".
- After Muzzy and Bob introduce themselves, Norman, as a postman, talks about "who" while delivering a letter eventually to Corvax.
- After Muzzy tells Bob where he came from, Norman interviews many bikers in a race from different countries.
- While spelling his and Sylvia's names on the prison cell wall, Bob and Muzzy say the Alphabet depending on the country. (For example, Ñ is included for the Spanish version).
- When Corvax tries to woo Sylvia, Norman gives an arrow chasing him instructions such as "come here" and "go away".
- When Muzzy gets wet after escaping prison with Bob, Norman has various conditions like that, and his wife offers solutions to get rid of them.
- While Muzzy is looking for Bob, Norman talks about "where" using a box.
- After Norman encounters the six Sylvia clones together, he acknowledges that they're all Sylvia, then says the names of colours after they talk about the colour of the dress they are each wearing.
- Before lunch begins at the castle, Norman does various activities at different times and keeps being interrupted by a ringing telephone.
- When Sylvia fakes a headache, Norman becomes a physician and gives various items to his patients. After that, the King and Queen talk about masculine and feminine pronouns ("his" and "her").
- After Bob tells Muzzy that it gets dark earlier in Autumn, Norman talks about the seasons, months and days.
- When Sylvia questions why Muzzy likes clocks, Norman talks about "why" with a boy who can't reach an apple.
- When Muzzy, Bob and Sylvia find the Sylvia clones, Norman compares them and sees how they are all different.
- Near the denouement, Norman interacts with the main story world once more by inquiring of Sylvia; angered, Bob rejects him by knocking him off his bicycle.

== Cast ==
- Jack May as Muzzy, a large, furry, greenish-blue extraterrestrial who eats metallic and mechanical objects, mainly clocks.
  Muzzy, the titular character.
- Willie Rushton as the King, a lion who is the ruler of Gondoland. Rushton also provides additional voices.
- Miriam Margolyes as the Queen, a rat who is the King's wife. Margolyes also voices Norman's wife.
- Susan Sheridan as Princess Sylvia, a dog who is the King and Queen's daughter. Sheridan also provides additional voices.
- Derek Griffiths as Bob, a mouse who is the royal gardener and Sylvia's love interest, and Corvax, a green goblin mad scientist who is the King's vizier and Bob's rival for Sylvia's affection. Griffiths also provides additional voices.
- Benjamin Whitrow as Norman, a human bicyclist.

== As a language course ==
DMP Organization, the worldwide distributor of the Muzzy courses, has licensed the development of the New Muzzy to Digital Education SA. There are various distributors of the course around the world. The original system was available in the following languages: French, Spanish, Italian, German, Russian, Portuguese, Welsh (advertised only on S4C in Wales), Irish (advertised as Muzzy Mór, literally Big Muzzy), Scottish Gaelic (Muzzy Mòr), Esperanto, Japanese (vocabulary builder only), and Mandarin Chinese.
