= Spy Story (film) =

1976 British espionage film

- Directed by: Lindsay Shonteff
- Based on: Spy Story by Len Deighton
- Produced by: Lindsay Shonteff
- Starring: Michael Petrovitch; Philip Latham; Don Fellows
- Edited by: John Gibson
- Music by: Roger Wootton
- Production company: Lindsay Shonteff Film Productions
- Release date: 1976
- Country: United Kingdom
- Language: English

Spy Story is a 1976 British espionage film directed and produced by Lindsay Shonteff and starring Michael Petrovitch, Philip Latham and Don Fellows. It is based on the 1974 novel of the same title by Len Deighton.

== Plot ==
Agent Patrick Armstrong is pressured into taking part in an undercover operation to enable a Russian Admiral to defect to the West, but refuses. Armstrong is subsequently kidnapped, but escapes and travels by submarine to the Arctic, to assist in the defection. The plan fails, but in a second plan involving a substitute corpse, he is shot and later discovers that the defection plot was a dummy operation.

== Cast ==
- Michael Petrovitch as Patrick Armstrong
- Philip Latham as Ferdy Foxwell
- Don Fellows as Colonel Schlegel
- Michael Gwynn as Dawlish
- Nicholas Parsons as Ben Toliver
- Toby Robins as Helen Schlegel
- Tessa Wyatt as Sara Shaw
- Derren Nesbitt as Colonel Stok
- Nigel Plaskitt as Mason
- Ciaran Madden as Marjorie
- Bernard Kay as Commander Wheeler
- Paul Maxwell as submarine Captain
- Andrew Downie as MacGregor
- John Forgeham as security guard
- Michael Knowles as milkman

== Reception ==
The Monthly Film Bulletin wrote: "Many viewers are ... going to feel cheated by the realist style, the bright colour and the naturalistic sound. At every point where a conventional sequence development seems about to be realised it is abruptly arrested, most obviously in the use of the traditional 'flight into Scotland' trope (cf. The Thirty-Nine Steps) which is abandoned as inexplicably as it begins. Spy Story is, in fact, is the supreme anti-Hitchcock, naturalising the Master's most celebrated and most familiar formal devices so that they are neutralised and exist as figures in a pattern from which emotion, and above all suspense, has been eliminated."

David McGillivray wrote in Screen International: "One way to boost the business of Spy Story would be to offer prizes to those who could prove they understood it. It is, to my mind, incomprehensible from beginning to end. ... This would be unimportant, of course, had the plot been a hook on which to hang the sex and violence usually associated with espionage thilers. But there is none. Author Len Deighton's intention (to which Lindsay Shonteff has adhered slavishly) was to point up the childishness and futility of Secret Services by detailing page upon page of exchanged pleasantries and political shop talk. Much of this is well observed (apparently there is no screenplay credit because Shanteff got his secretary to copy the dialogue direct from the novel), and much is well played, particularly by Don Fellows and the late Michael Gwynn. But unfortunately does not make for very compulsive viewing."

In The Guardian, Derek Malcolm wrote: "I haven't read Len Deighton's Spy Story but would imagine it a great deal less difficult to get through than the resulting film. Made (cheapishly by the looks of it) by the Canadian director Lindsay Shonteff, in England, it is a mundane and confused reworking, like a crossword puzzle shorn of half its clues. According to the synopsis, Michael Petrovich was chosen to play the central character, a latterday Harry Palmer groping gloomily with treacherous war games, because the director 'liked the quiet power behind his unassuming facade.' Well, he can say that again and believe it again if he likes. Even such sturdy familiars as Philip Latham, Michael Gwynne and Don Fellows can make no impression on an amorphous script unwisely culled too closely from the book. I'm sorry to say the film left a complete blank on my quietly powerful facade."

Time Out wrote: "Shonteff's film catches Deighton's nuances of power and corruption, but sequences that do for starters hardly work as a continuing ploy; and soon characters are locked in limp confrontation, exchanging increasingly cryptic chunks of information while the plot works towards total incomprehensibility."

In The Historical Dictionary of British Spy Fiction, Alan Burton wrote: "It is a literal account of the original story, only lacking a few scenes .... The film was largely shot on location, giving it a raw and authentic quality, but was so badly received by the critics as dull, confusing, and inept that a battered Shonteff was led to publish a letter of complaint in which he berated critics as 'hypocrites'."
