= Washington Muzzy =

American farmer and politician (1828-1896)

Isaac Washington Muzzy (September 10, 1828 – April 27, 1896) was an American farmer and politician.

Muzzy was born in Sandy Creek, Oswego County, New York and moved to Ottertail, Otter Tail County, Minnesota in 1857 with his wife and family and was a farmer. He served in the 4th Minnesota Infantry Regiment during the American Civil War. Muzzy served in the Minnesota House of Representatives in 1885 and 1886 and was a member of the Farmer-Alliance. In 1893, he was the editor and publisher of the Montana Farmer agricultural magazine. Muzzy died in Chicago, Cook County, Illinois.
