= Spy Story (novel) =

1974 spy novel by Len Deighton

- First edition
- Author: Len Deighton
- Cover artist: Raymond Hawkey
- Language: English
- Genre: Spy novel
- Publisher: Jonathan Cape
- Publication date: 1974
- Publication place: UK
- Media type: Print (hardback and paperback)
- Pages: 224
- ISBN: 0-224-00971-0
- OCLC: 3207715
- Dewey Decimal: 823/.9/14
- LC Class: PZ4.D324 Sp PR6054.E37
- Preceded by: Close-Up (1972)
- Followed by: Yesterday's Spy (1975)

Spy Story is a 1974 spy novel by Len Deighton, which features minor characters from his earlier novels The IPCRESS File, Funeral in Berlin, Horse Under Water, and Billion Dollar Brain.

In common with several of his other early novels, the chapter headings have a "feature". In Spy Story these take the form of excerpts from the fictional Studies Centre's rules.

== Protagonist ==
As in the earlier "Unnamed hero" novels, we never learn the protagonist's name, only that he is living under an alias "Pat Armstrong". Armstrong works for the Studies Centre in London, where wargames are played with computer assistance, using the latest intelligence data on Soviet electronic warfare capabilities. We learn in passing that Armstrong is in his late 30s and that he formerly worked for an unnamed intelligence organisation, which may well be the WOOC(P) of the earlier books – Dawlish, the head of WOOC(P) in the earlier novels, appears as a character, where it is revealed that he was Armstrong's superior. An additional character from earlier novels is Soviet KGB Colonel Oleg Stok.

== Plot ==
The story opens with Armstrong and his colleague Ferdy Foxwell returning from a six-week mission aboard a nuclear submarine, gathering data on Soviet communications and electronic warfare techniques in the Arctic Ocean. He and Foxwell visit "The Bonnet", a rural Scottish public house. On returning to London, Armstrong's car breaks down on his way home and he decides to use the phone in his old flat, for which he still has the key. He is surprised and disturbed to discover that the flat has been refurnished, including photographs which he owns but with someone else replacing him in the images, wearing identical clothes. He discovers a door hidden in the back of the wardrobe leading into the adjoining flat, which has been fitted out as some kind of sick bay. When he leaves the flat thinking that a taxi he ordered has arrived, he is confronted by Special Branch officers who have a former member of the Studies Centre verify who he is before releasing him.

While they were away, the Studies Centre acquired a new boss, the abrasive American, Charles Schlegel, a former Marine Corps Colonel. Foxwell and Schlegel do not get on at all well and even less so when Schlegel makes Armstrong his Personal Assistant. Shortly after his return, Armstrong is about to leave his flat when it is ransacked by KGB Colonel Oleg Stok and two assistants, who even blow open a safe left by the previous occupant. They offer no explanation for this, leaving Armstrong yet more puzzled. At a party at Ferdy Foxwell's palatial London house, Armstrong learns that Foxwell is close to MP Ben Toliver and has even been passing him classified information. Also at the party is Dawlish, the head of the intelligence organisation WOOC(P) of earlier books. We learn that Armstrong worked for Dawlish before deciding to quit intelligence work. Dawlish tries to recruit him but Armstrong turns him down.

Toliver has a suspicious car accident returning home from Foxwell's party. Armstrong traces the woman who was reported to be with him to a small French restaurant, where he discovers photos of a Soviet Rear-Admiral and a Soviet Rear-Admiral's uniform being made. He returns to the restaurant later to discover it deserted. Breaking in, he discovers all traces of what he had earlier seen have been removed, along with all paperwork. Armstrong uses the Studies Centre library to find the name of the Soviet Rear-Admiral: Remoziva, whose equally high-achieving sister is leading a Soviet delegation negotiating the re-unification of East and West Germany.

Leaving the restaurant, he is met by a high-ranking police officer who escorts him to Battersea, from where a helicopter takes him to Heathrow Airport, from whence he is flown north in a small single-engine aircraft. It takes him to a remote location in the west of Scotland, where he finds Toliver and his co-conspirators. It appears that they have been running their own unauthorised intelligence operation to arrange the defection of Admiral Remoziva, who will die within a year if he does not receive treatment for a kidney condition. The plan is to meet the Admiral on the Arctic ice and leave a corpse in his place. They had planned to keep him at Armstrong's former flat, and use the adjoining medical bay to treat him. Armstrong receives a message from an unidentified member of the clique advising him to leave, which he does. After a nightmare journey through a snowstorm, he reaches a road, where he finds Dawlish and Schlegel waiting. They tell him that the defection is still on, although using a USN submarine instead of a British one.

Out on the Arctic ice, they rendezvous with Remoziva's helicopter but it turns out to contain Colonel Stok. After a brief struggle the helicopter takes off with one of Stok's men holding on to Foxwell. Armstrong grabs Foxwell's legs and is also hauled aloft. He fires at the man holding Foxwell and they both fall to the ice. He manages to lift Foxwell and staggers off to where their submarine has surfaced but by the time he reaches it Foxwell is dead. At the end of the book it is revealed that the scheme was to discredit Remoziva and by association, his siblings; his sister is forced to step down from the German Re-unification negotiations, causing the talks to collapse.

== The Studies Centre ==
Len Deighton's fascination with military history and computers are combined in Ferdy Foxwell's Studies Centre. The Centre possesses a mainframe computer, which is used in contract to the Ministry of Defence and its officers for studying likely military scenarios for the Cold War becoming a Hot War. Ferdy is an expert games player, and usually defeats the officers sent to play against him. A noteworthy win involves simulating the ability of Soviet amphibians to land on ice on the Bering Strait in winter, which extends their range and allows them to act as a deterrent to warships, which US Navy officers did not expect. Ferdy and his programmers are also somewhat playful, inserting whimsical error codes into the computer's software (which is programmed in FORTRAN). An example given is "I'm only a bloody machine but I know how to print a label once only" for a program halt.

The Studies Centre does not only run military strategy simulations; it also produces simulations of historical battles, for the education of military professionals. One simulation discussed is a re-run of the Battle of Britain exploring what might have happened if the Germans had fitted drop tanks to Luftwaffe Bf 109 E-4 fighters. "During the battle the Germans had long-range drop tanks for the single-seat fighters, but did not use them. Once you programme double fuel loads for the fighters, there are many permutations for the bombing attacks."

Ferdy's interest in producing defeats and his success in historical and real situations produces much suspicion from his colleagues and from the Ministry, after only a few years. Patrick Armstrong and the Colonel have been called in by the Minister to investigate possible breaches in security, as Ferdy's passionate activity could be the work of the KGB to break military morale, as well as learning tactical secrets useful in a possible war with the Soviets.

== Reception ==
The book was a best-seller in Great Britain, reaching number 2 on The Bookseller best-seller list. The Jonathan Cape hardcover sold 40,000 copies.

Critics generally praised the book, though several complained about the wafer-thin characterisations and the convoluted plot.

The Times Literary Supplement deemed it "a vintage Len Deighton thriller" but complained that Deighton had made "no real advance on his books of ten years ago. Mr. Deighton has, after all, written himself into the position of being judged by rather high standards." The TLS critic praised Deighton's "impeccable handling of the widely different locations", but complained that "the story [and] the characters are empty (though not by the standards of the genre)." Despite this, the TLS critic believed "there is an overall impression of richness. We have been to these, or similar, locations before on spying trips: an isolated castle in Scotland, a nuclear submarine under the northern ice-pack, a party of brittle richesse in Camden. The action and the high life are familiar enough, but the skill with which each is drawn and integrated is beguiling. Too laconic for an old-fashioned cliffhanger, Mr Deighton yet produces a sort of dispassionate cerebral excitement which, like the polar ice itself, is nine-tenths submerged and all the more menacing for that."

Roderick MacLeish, in The Washington Post Book World remarked that Deighton is fun, and unlike John le Carré, Deighton recognises the amoral darkness of intelligence, politics and the spiritual rot that infects anyone who gets involved "is relegated to the status of cushioning for good, exciting stories." MacLeish says Spy Story is almost as much fun as "the superb yarn" Funeral in Berlin. MacLeish praised Deighton's sense of place: "the atmospherics ring forever true. Deighton seems to know the places he writes about—the bone-buckling cold and interminable rain of the Highlands will be familiar to anyone who has ever tramped across those wastes of appalling beauty. The hushed, lifeless world of ice, emptiness and stars that look as if they would break from the sky while submarines, with the power to incinerate the world, play tag miles below, is redolent of the desolation which, said Tacitus, the conquerors of his time called peace." MacLeish said that the polar ice-cap climax is "one of the most hair-raising passages ever written about sea warfare." However, writing about the protagonist Patrick Armstrong, MacLeish writes, "He needs a bath and loses his mistress in the end because of the things he's done in the beginning and the middle. Deighton is better at plots and settings than he is at people. But the plots are marvelous and the settings alone are worth the price of admission."

Gene Lyons, writing in The New York Times Book Review noted that Deighton's success as a writer of spy thrillers "has always rested on his recognition of the humorous possibilities of the form." Lyons calls the book a "superior entertainment" and remarks that "Deighton seeks a literate audience" but that protagonist Patrick Armstrong "display[s] only the vestigial personal memory needed to flesh him out, so that he may neither learn significantly from previous adventures, nor (God forbid) intellectualize overmuch."

However Pearl K. Bell writing in The New Leader called the book "an impenetrable lemon". "The artful fuzziness so completely overwhelmed the plot that the book was unreadable, all murk and no menace." Bell said that "evasive indirection has been Deighton's trademark since his first spy novel, The IPCRESS File, appeared in 1963. At the time, his obsessive reliance on the blurred and intangible, on loaded pauses and mysteriously disjointed dialogue, did convey the shadowy meanness of the spy's world, with its elusive loyalties, camouflaged identities and weary brutality. But Deighton's later efforts have bloated these cryptic and inscrutable mannerisms into a dense fog of unknowing."

== Film ==
A film adaptation starring Michael Petrovitch as Pat Armstrong was released in 1976, directed by Lindsay Shonteff.
