= Nicky Henson =

British actor (1945–2019)

- Henson in Witchfinder General (1968)
- Born: Nicholas Victor Leslie Henson; 12 May 1945; London, England
- Died: 15 December 2019 (aged 74)
- Occupation: Actor
- Years active: 1964–2019
- Spouses: Una Stubbs (m. 1969; div. 1975) Marguerite Porter (m. 1986)
- Children: 3, including Christian and Keaton

Nicholas Victor Leslie Henson (12 May 1945 – 15 December 2019) was a British actor.

== Early life ==
Henson was born in London, the son of Harriet Martha (née Collins) and comedian Leslie Henson, a few days after VE Day, hence his middle name, Victor. Adam Henson, a farmer and regular presenter on BBC TV's Countryfile, is Henson's nephew; being the son of Nicky's brother Joe Henson.

He attended St. Bede's Prep School in Eastbourne and Charterhouse in Godalming. He entered the stage management course at RADA being below the minimum age for the acting course, to which he transferred as planned the following year. He first appeared on stage himself as a guitarist. As a member of the Young Vic Company, he played Pozzo in Samuel Beckett's Waiting for Godot.

== Career ==
=== Television ===
Henson appeared in various television roles, including guest roles in Fawlty Towers, Minder, Boon, Inspector Morse, A Touch of Frost, Heartbeat, After You've Gone, Lovejoy and Doctors. In 1990 he played the doctor in the BBC’s adaptation of Kingsley Amis’ Ghost story The Green Man. He played the eponymous hero in Shine on Harvey Moon when the series was revived in 1995. He also played Michael in the upper hand.

In 2005, he played Hugo, an antiques dealer, in Bad Girls. In February 2006, Henson joined the cast of EastEnders, playing Jack Edwards. Henson left the production towards the end of the year due to health problems.

Henson played three different characters in the police drama series The Bill, the first in 1991, the second in 1998, and the third in 2007. In 2010, he appeared as Charles Grigg, a former acquaintance of Carson the butler, in an episode of Downton Abbey and appeared in two episodes in 2013. He also played Randolph Mepstead, the older brother of David Jason's character in the pilot episode of the mid-1970s series Lucky Feller.

Henson played the role of Mr Johnson in the Fawlty Towers episode "The Psychiatrist". He stated that despite his 50 years of professional acting, his tombstone will probably read "Here lies Nicky Henson – he was in one episode of Fawlty Towers". He was paid a modest appearance fee and he was told he might earn the same again in repeats fees.

=== Films ===
Henson's film appearances include Witchfinder General (1968), There's a Girl in My Soup (1970), Mosquito Squadron (1970) and Psychomania (1973). He graduated to lead roles in The Bawdy Adventures of Tom Jones (1976) and No. 1 of the Secret Service (1977), before returning to supporting roles in Vera Drake (2004) and George Clooney's Syriana (2005).

=== Theatre ===
On stage, Henson played many Shakespearean characters (including a period with the Royal Shakespeare Company from 1977) and had leading roles in Look Back in Anger, Man and Superman, Rosencrantz and Guildenstern are Dead, She Stoops to Conquer, Noises Off and others. He appeared as Mordred in the original 1964 London version of Camelot opposite Laurence Harvey as King Arthur. Henson made his Broadway debut in a production of Oscar Wilde's An Ideal Husband, opposite Stephanie Beacham. Henson played Colonel Vershinin in a notable 1990 production of Anton Chekhov's play Three Sisters, alongside the Cusack sisters (Sorcha, Niamh, and Sinead) and their father Cyril Cusack at London's Royal Court Theatre. He was nominated for a 1998 Laurence Olivier Theatre Award for Best Supporting Performance in a Musical of 1997 for his role in Enter the Guardsman.

Henson started directing with a Restoration workshop at LAMDA with a production of The Provok'd Wife. In 2009, he directed the Jack Shepherd play Only When I Laugh at the Arcola Theatre in London and Alan Ayckbourn's Intimate Exchanges at Sheringham Little Theatre.

=== Radio ===
Henson played Lemuel "Chipper" Barnet in Space Force series 1 and 2 (1984–1985). He also played Major in Dombey and Son (BBC Radio 15 Minute Drama, 2007).

== Personal life, illness and death ==
Henson married actress Una Stubbs (who played his sister-in-law Caroline Bishop in EastEnders). The couple had two sons, including Christian. The marriage ended after Henson began an affair in 1974 with actress Susan Hampshire, his co-star in several stage productions.

He later married ballerina Marguerite Porter, with whom he had a third son, Keaton.

Henson was diagnosed with cancer in 2003. Surgeons removed tumours from around his spleen, but a routine check-up in 2006 showed that other tumours had grown and it would have been dangerous to remove them. As such, he was put on a regime of chemotherapy and he worked regularly to raise funds for cancer charities, especially Marie Curie Cancer Care. He died on 15 December 2019, aged 74.

== Filmography ==
Film
| Year | Title | Role | Notes |
|---|---|---|---|
| 1964 | Father Came Too! | Motorcyclist | |
| 1965 | Every Day's a Holiday | Tailor's Shop Customer | Uncredited |
| 1966 | Doctor in Clover | Boutique Assistant | |
| 1967 | The Jokers | Man at Party with Hunting Horn | |
| 1967 | I'll Never Forget What's'isname | Young Man at Disco | Uncredited |
| 1968 | Here We Go Round the Mulberry Bush | Craig Foster | |
| 1968 | 30 Is a Dangerous Age, Cynthia | Paul | |
| 1968 | Witchfinder General | Trooper Swallow | |
| 1969 | Crooks and Coronets | Lord Freddie Fitzmore | |
| 1969 | Mosquito Squadron | Flight Sergeant Wiley Bunce | |
| 1969 | The Coward Revue | | Television film |
| 1970 | There's a Girl in My Soup | Jimmy | |
| 1972 | All Coppers Are... | Barry | |
| 1973 | Psychomania | Tom Latham | |
| 1973 | The Love Ban | Baker | |
| 1973 | Penny Gold | Rogers | |
| 1974 | Vampira | Marc Williams | |
| 1975 | Bedtime with Rosie | Fantasy Man | Uncredited |
| 1976 | The Bawdy Adventures of Tom Jones | Tom Jones | |
| 1977 | No. 1 of the Secret Service | No. 1 / Charles Bind | |
| 1980 | The Double Dealer | Brisk | Television film |
| 1981 | A Midsummer Night's Dream | Demetrius | Television film |
| 1982 | Anyone for Denis? | Vouvrey | Television film |
| 1985 | Tropical Moon Over Dorking | Rex | Television film |
| 1985 | Absurd Person Singular | Sidney Hopcroft | Television film |
| 1986 | Season's Greetings | Neville | Television film |
| 1988 | Star Trap | Adam Blunt | Television film |
| 1993 | Micky Love | Martin Bowen | Television film |
| 1994 | The Healer | Dr Ralph Raebryte | Television film |
| 1996 | Death at Broadcasting House | Detective Sergeant Ring (voice) | Direct-to-video |
| 1997 | From the Bottom of a Well | (voice) | Direct-to-video |
| 1998 | Anorak of Fire | Jim O'Rourke | Television film |
| 1999 | Parting Shots | Askew | |
| 2001 | Me Without You | Ray | |
| 2001 | Death, Deceit and Destiny Aboard the Orient Express | Tom Finlay | |
| 2001 | Love or Money | Guy | Television film |
| 2002 | Flyfishing | Howard | |
| 2004 | Vera Drake | Private Doctor | |
| 2004 | The Fete | Ray | Short |
| 2005 | A Waste of Shame | John Shakespeare | Television film |
| 2005 | Syriana | Sydney Hewitt | |
| 2006 | A Quiet Drink | Peter | Short |
| 2008 | Dr. No: The Radio Play | Chief of Staff (voice) | |
| 2011 | Blitz | Superintendent Brown | |
| 2012 | Truth or Dare | Mr Hautbois | Uncredited |
| 2012 | Run for Your Wife | Hospital Patient | |
| 2014 | We Still Kill the Old Way (2014 film) | Jack Houghton | |
| 2015 | Narcopolis | Chief Ballard | |
| 2015 | Draw on Sweet Night | Sir Thomas Kytson | |
| 2015 | Brackish Water | Richard Holmwood | Short |
| 2016 | Tommy's Honour | Charles Kinloch | |
| 2016 | Gozo | Tony | |
| 2016 | We Still Steal the Old Way | Jack Houghton | |
| 2017 | The Holly Kane Experiment | Marvin Greenslade | |
| 2018 | Tango One | Latham | Final film role |

Television
| Year | Title | Role | Notes |
|---|---|---|---|
| 1961 | The Avengers | Crowd member | Series 1, episode 20 |
| 1964 | Paris 1900 | Dardillon | Series 1, episode 5 |
| 1964 | The Human Jungle | (Uncredited) | Series 2, episode 8 |
| 1966 | The Frost Report | Various roles | Series 1 (13 episodes) |
| 1967 | Vacant Lot | Rock | Series 1, episodes 1 & 3 |
| 1968 | ITV Playhouse | Amos Wild | Series 1, episode 21 |
| 1971 | Shirley's World | Beanie | Series 1, episode 7 |
| 1971 | Comedy Playhouse | Nicky | Series 11, episode 5 |
| 1972 | BBC Show of the Week | | 1 episode |
| 1972 | Arthur of the Britons | Garet | Series 1, episode 3 |
| 1974 | Comedy Playhouse | Nick Ransley | Series 14, episode 9 |
| 1975 | Prometheus: The Life of Balzac | Honore de Balzac | Miniseries (6 episodes) |
| 1975 | Lucky Feller | Randolph 'Randy' Mepstead | Pilot episode |
| 1977 | The Foundation | Douggie Taylor | Series 1 (4 episodes) |
| 1977 | Cottage to Let | Steve | Series 1, episode 4 |
| 1978 | That's the Way the Money Goes | Paul | Series 1 (8 episodes) |
| 1979 | Fawlty Towers | Mr Johnson | Series 2, episode 2 |
| 1979 | Minder | George Wilson | Series 1, episode 2 |
| 1980 | Seagull Island (Note: A feature length version, titled The Secret of Seagull Island, was released in 1982.) | Martin Foster | Miniseries (5 episodes) |
| 1981 | Whoops Apocalypse | Engelbert (uncredited) | Series 1, episode 4 |
| 1982 | BBC2 Playhouse | Tosh | Series 8, episode 29 |
| 1983 | The Happy Apple | Charles Murray | Series 1 (7 episodes) |
| 1984 | Driving Ambition | Allan Hearshner | Series 1, episodes 5 & 8 |
| 1987 | Sunday Premiere | Alistair | 1 episode 1986 "" Season's Greetings" by Alan Aykbourne BBC play |
| 1987 | Home to Roost | Edward Willows | Series 3, episode 2 |
| 1988 | Singles | Gerry | Series 1, episode 5 |
| 1988 | Thin Air | Richard Heller | Miniseries (5 episodes) |
| 1989 | Inspector Morse | Vince Cranston | Series 3, episode 3 |
| 1989 | Boon | Terry Patterson | Series 4, episode 13 |
| 1990 | After Henry | Ian | Series 3, episode 10 |
| 1990–1991 | The Upper Hand | Michael Wheatley | Series 1–2 (4 episodes) |
| 1990 | The Green Man | Jack | Miniseries (3 episodes) |
| 1991 | The Bill | Colin Mathews | Series 7, episodes 75 & 76 |
| 1992 | Between the Lines | Ch. Supt. Charlie McGregor | Series 1, episode 10 |
| 1993 | Wales Playhouse | Gruff | Series 2, episode 3 |
| 1993 | Sitting Pretty | Philip | Series 2, episode 1 |
| 1994 | Health and Efficiency | Anthony Bolt | Series 1, episode 4 |
| 1994 | Class Act | Sammy Buchanan | Series 1, episode 2 |
| 1995 | Shine on Harvey Moon | Harvey Moon | Series 5 (main role, 12 episodes) |
| 1995–1997 | All Quiet on the Preston Front | Greg Scarry | Series 2–3 (5 episodes) |
| 1995 | Coronation Street: The Feature Length Special | Henri de Vence | Direct-to-video |
| 1996 | Pie in the Sky | Harrington Smithfield | Series 4, episode 3 |
| 1997 | Paul Merton in Galton and Simpson's... | CID Officer | Series 2, episode 2 |
| 1998 | The Bill | John Defoe | Series 14, episode 67 |
| 1999–2000 | A Touch of Frost | DS Larry Finlay | Series 7, episodes 1 & 2 |
| 2001 | Midsomer Murders | Simon Reason | Series 4, episode 5 |
| 2002 | Heartbeat | Alan Jones | Series 11, episode 16 |
| 2002 | NCS: Manhunt | Vincent Fairey | Series 1, episodes 3 & 5 |
| 2003 | Swiss Toni | Mike Black | Series 1, episode 3 |
| 2003 | Blue Dove | Gerry Weston | Miniseries |
| 2005 | Bad Girls | Hugo | Series 7, episode 3 |
| 2006 | EastEnders | Jack Edwards | 37 episodes |
| 2007 | Midsomer Murders | Terence Charteris | Series 10, episode 7 |
| 2007 | After You've Gone | David | Series 2, episode 4 |
| 2007 | The Bill | Vince Murray | Series 23, episodes 73 & 74 |
| 2008 | Doctors | Carl Knight | Series 9, episode 205 |
| 2010 | Casualty | A Dawson (uncredited) | Series 24, episode 20 |
| 2010, 2013 | Downton Abbey | Charles Grigg | Series 1 & 4 (3 episodes) |
| 2014 | No Point | Charity Shop Customer | |
| 2016 | Grantchester | Frank Archer | Series 2, episode 2 |
| 2017 | Doctors | Eddie Canbray | Series 19, episode 57 |

Audio plays
| Year | Title | Role | Notes |
|---|---|---|---|
| 2001, 2008 | Doctor Who: The Monthly Adventures | Pieter Stubbe Dick Turpin / Grel | Series 2, episode 5 Series 9, episode 9 |
| 2010 | Doctor Who: The Eighth Doctor Adventures | Gregson Grenville Ice Warriors | Series 4, episode 5 Series 4, episode 6 |
