= Fire of Moscow (1812) =

Part of the French invasion of Russia

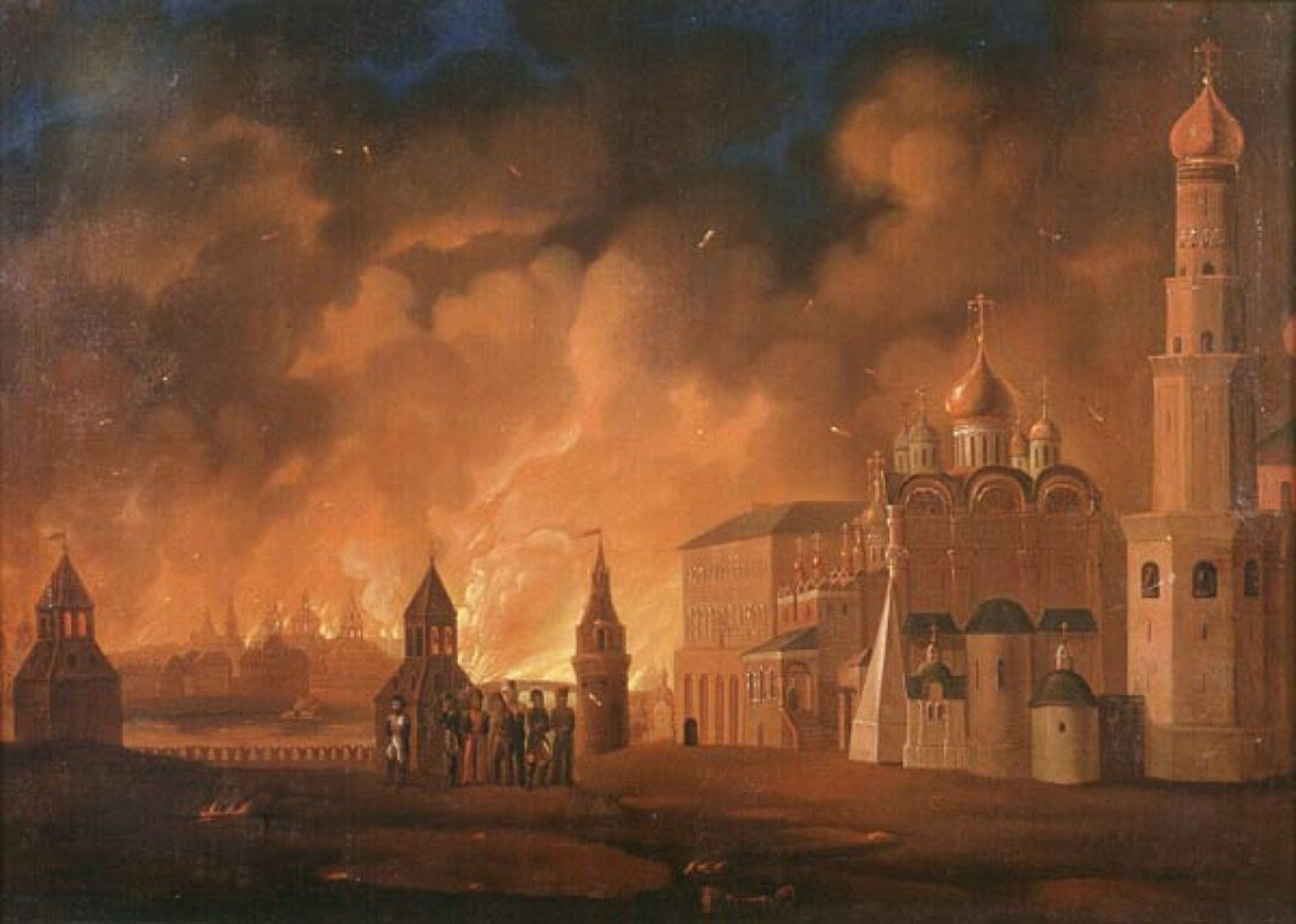
- Fire of Moscow by Alexander Smirnov, 1813
- Date: 14–18 September 1812
- Location: Moscow, Russian Empire
- Outcome: Russian evacuation: Destruction of 6,496 out of 9,151 residential buildings; Destruction of 6,584 wooden and 2,567 stone houses; Destruction of 122 out of 329 churches.

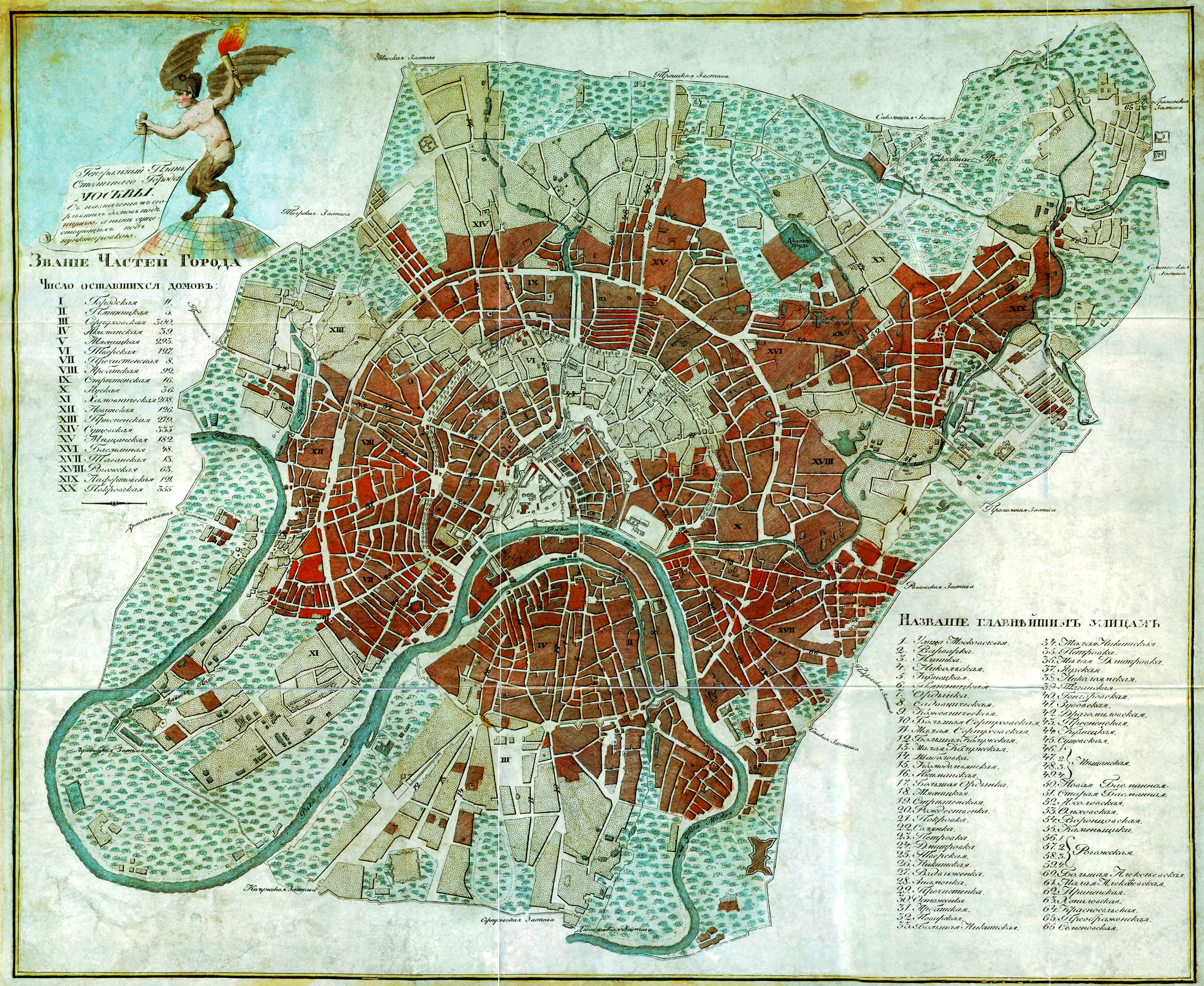
An 1817 map. Areas of Moscow destroyed by the fire are in red.

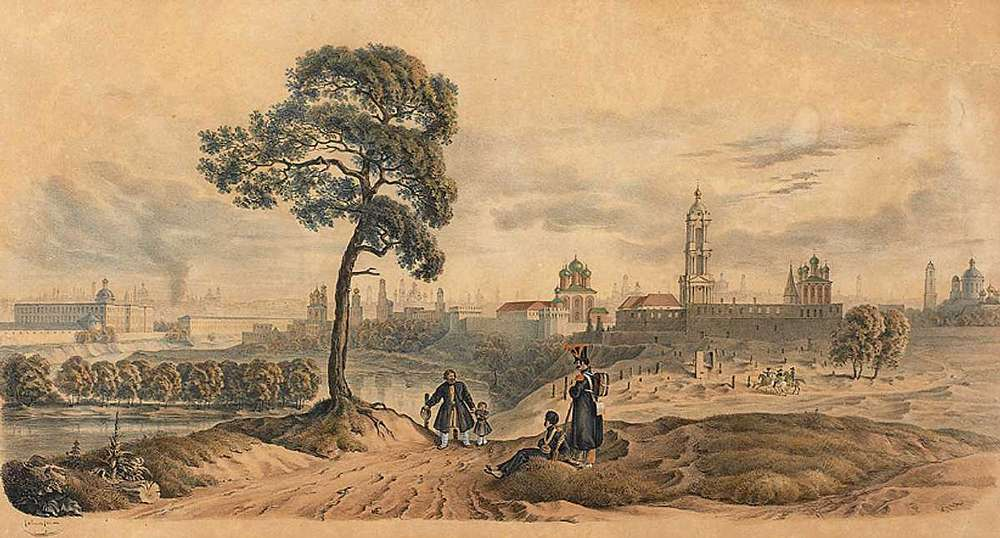
Faber du Faur Moskau 1812

During the French occupation of Moscow, a fire persisted from 14 to 18 September 1812 and destroyed the city. The Russian troops and most of the remaining civilians had abandoned the city on 14 September 1812 just ahead of French Emperor Napoleon's troops entering the city after the Battle of Borodino. The Moscow military governor, Count Fyodor Rostopchin, has often been considered responsible for organising the destruction of the former capital to weaken the French army in the scorched city even more.

== Background ==
After continuing Barclay's "delaying operation" as part of his attrition warfare against Napoleon, Kutuzov used Rostopchin to burn most of Moscow's resources as part of a scorched earth strategy, guerilla warfare by the Cossacks against French supplies and total war by the peasants against French foraging. This kind of war without major battles weakened the French army at its most vulnerable point: military logistics. On 19 October 1812, the French army, lacking provisions and being warned by the first snow, abandoned the city voluntarily.

Regarding the state of Moscow itself, the city was mostly deserted, at least in comparison to its normal levels of population: At the beginning of 1812 Moscow had around 270,184 inhabitants according to a contemporary police survey; of these, somewhere between 6,200 and 10,000 civilians chose to remain in the city after the arrival of the French, in addition to between 10,000 and 15,000 sick or wounded Russian soldiers.

== Causes ==
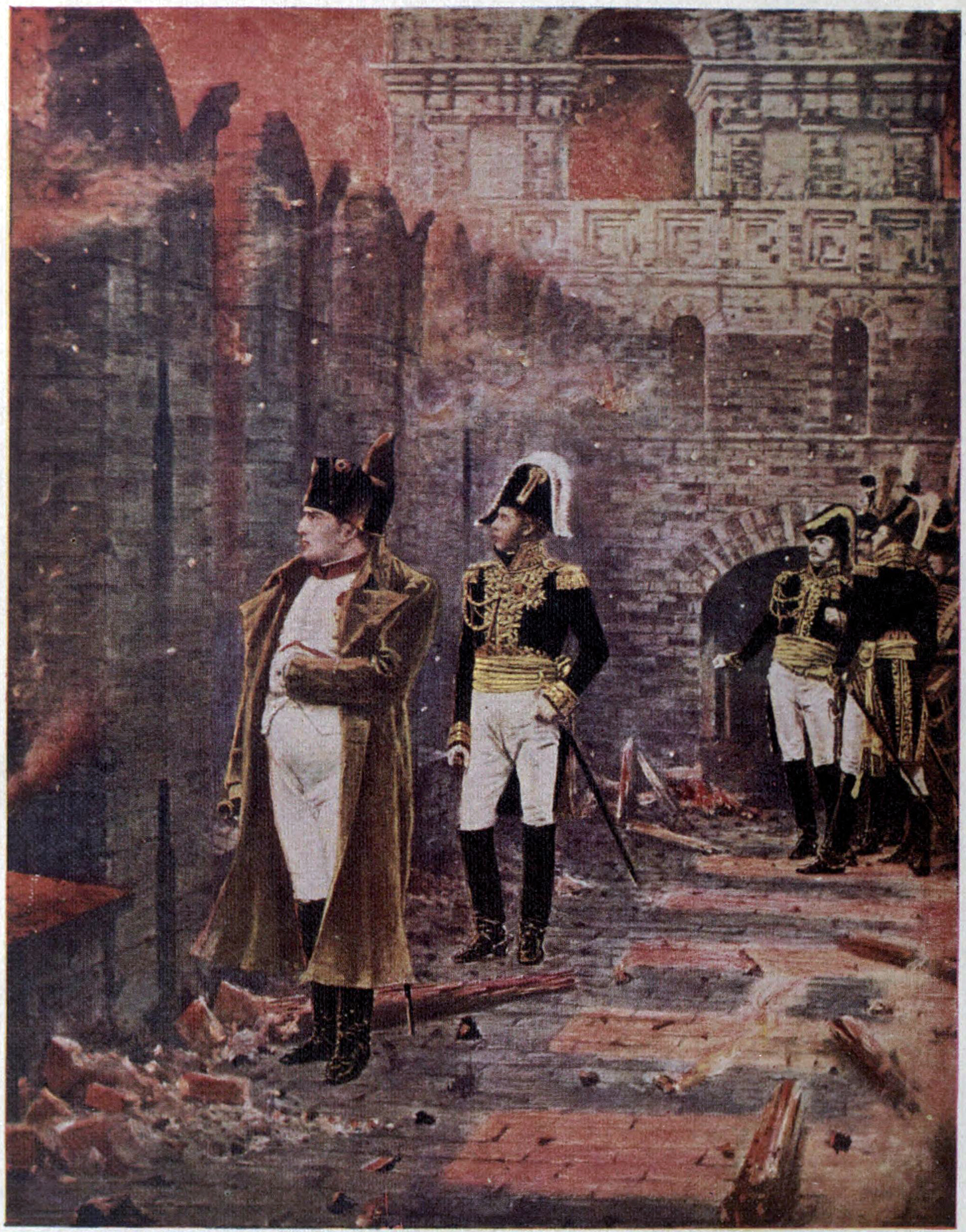
Napoleon watching the fire of Moscow from the walls of the Kremlin

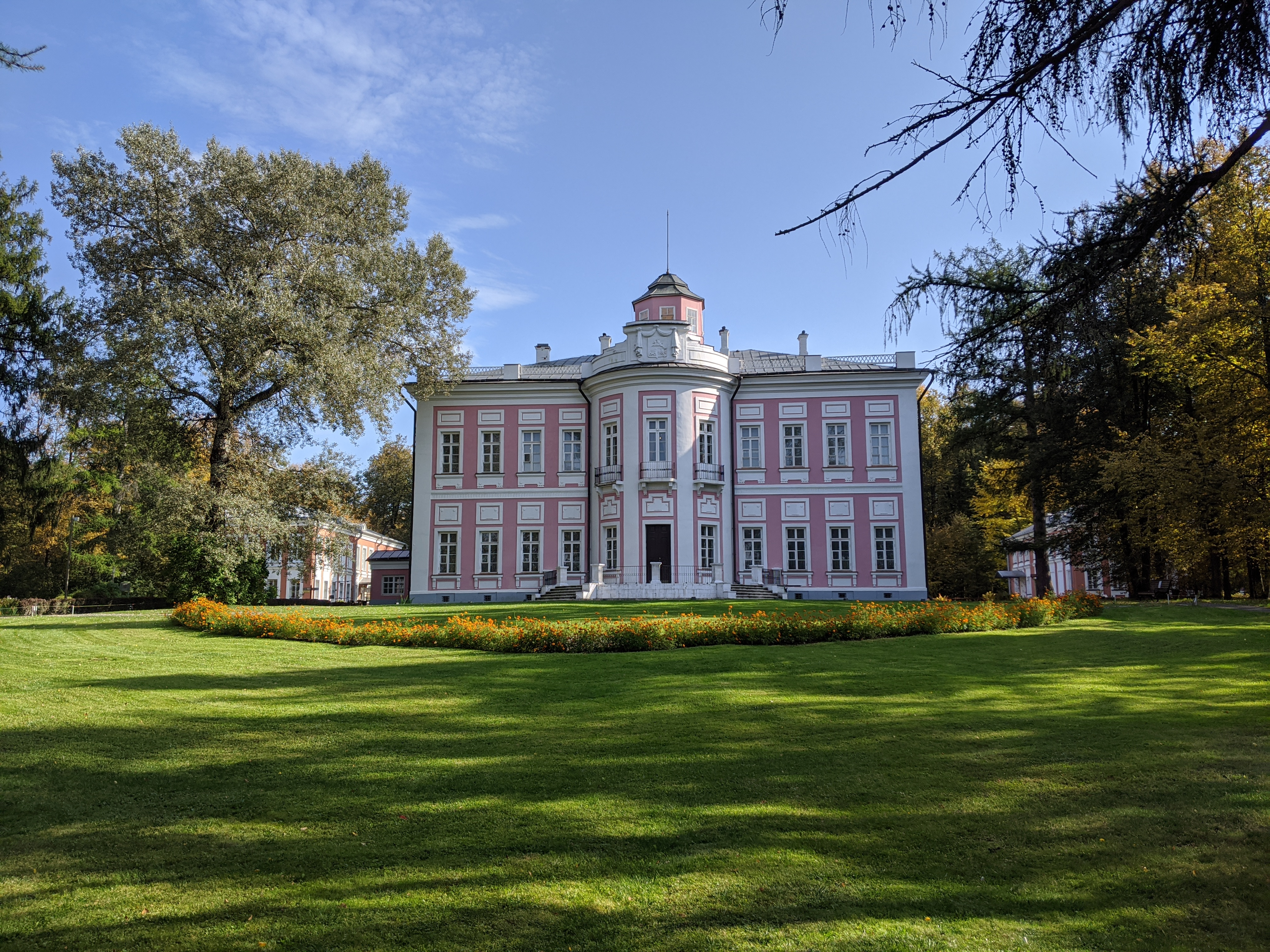
Vyazyomy Manor

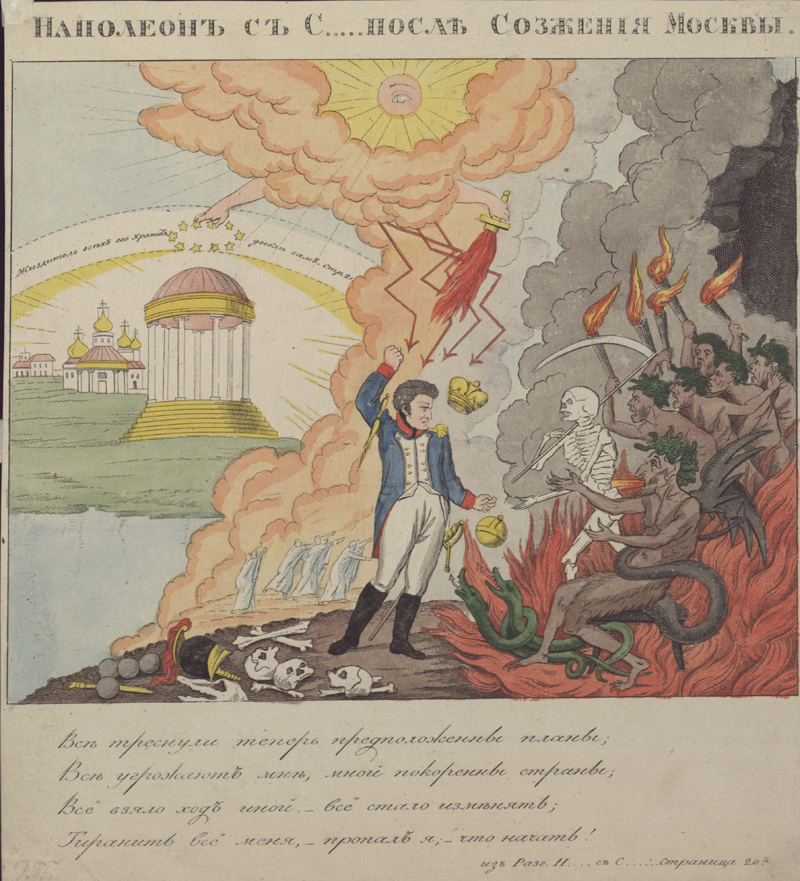
A 19th-century caricature (lubok) of Napoleon meeting Satan after the Fire of Moscow, by Ivan Alekseevich Ivanov

Search had been made for the fire-engines since the previous day, but some of them had been taken away and the rest put out of action...The Poles reported that they had already caught some incendiaries and shot them, ...they had extracted the information that orders had been given by the Governor of the city and the police that the whole city should be burnt during the night.

Before leaving Moscow, Count Rostopchin supposedly gave orders to the head of police (and released convicts) to have the Kremlin and major public buildings (including churches and monasteries) set on fire. During the following days, the fires spread. According to Germaine de Staël, who left the city a few weeks before Napoleon arrived and afterward corresponded with Kutuzov, it was Rostopchin who ordered his own mansions to be set on fire, so no Frenchmen should lodge in it. The French actress Louise Fusil, who was living in Moscow, wrote that the fire started at Petrovka Street and offers more details in her memoirs. Today, the majority of historians blame the initial fires on the Russian strategy of scorched earth.

Furthermore, a Moscow police officer was captured trying to set the Kremlin on fire where Napoleon was staying at the time. Brought before Napoleon, the officer admitted he and others had been ordered to set the city on fire, after which he was bayonetted by guardsmen on the spot on the orders of a furious Napoleon.

The sight of the fire deeply disturbed Napoleon who was horrified and intimidated at the Russian resolution to destroy their most sacred and beloved city before surrendering it. According to him, most churches, monasteries, and palaces survived as they were made out of stone. A witness records him as remaining transfixed watching the fire from the Kremlin while saying: "What a terrible sight! And they did this themselves! So many palaces! What an incredible solution! What kind of people! These are Scythians!"

The catastrophe started as many small fires, which promptly grew out of control and formed a massive blaze from the northeast, according to Larrey. The fires spread quickly since most buildings in Moscow were made of wood, except in the German Quarter. Although Moscow had a fire brigade, their equipment had previously either been removed or destroyed on Rostopchin's orders. The flames spread into the Kremlin's arsenal, and was put out by French guardsmen. The burning of Moscow is reported to have been visible up to 200 versts (215 km, or 133 miles) away.

Tolstoy, in his book War and Peace, suggests that the fire was not deliberately set, neither by the Russians nor the French, but was the natural result of placing a deserted and mostly wooden city in the hands of invading troops. Before the invasion, fires would have started nearly every day even with the owners present and a fully functioning fire department, and the soldiers would start additional fires for their own needs, from smoking their pipes, cooking their food twice a day, and burning enemies' possessions in the streets. Some of those fires would inevitably get out of control, and without an efficient firefighting response, these individual building fires would spread to become neighborhood fires, and ultimately a citywide conflagration.

== Timeline of events ==
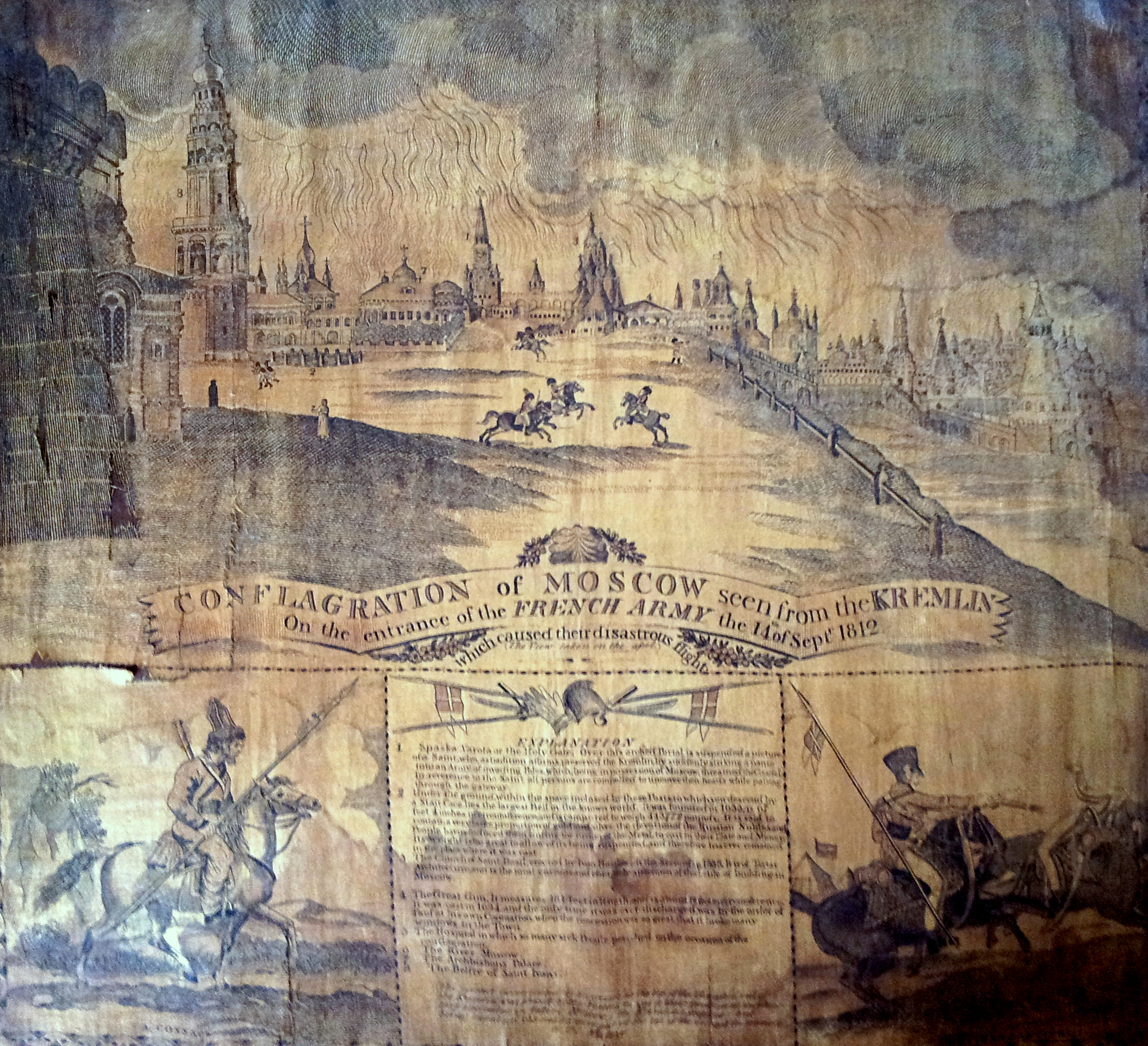
Commemorative Bandanna: Burning of Moscow (1812) Printed in England – "Conflagration of Moscow Seen from the Kremlin, on the entrance of the French Army, the 14th of Sept 1812"

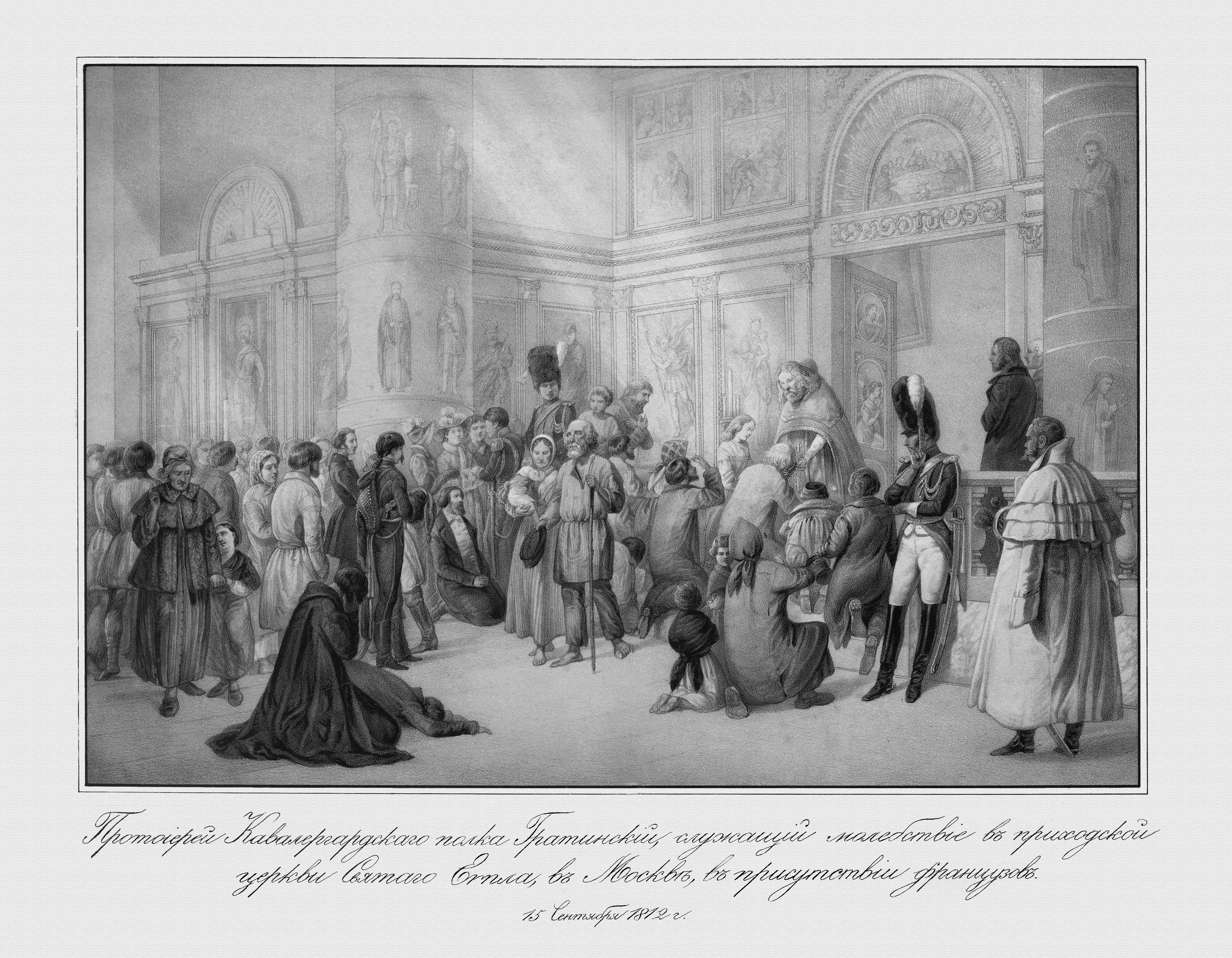
Liturgy in the Saint Euplo church of Moscow in presence of French soldiers, 27 September 1812.

Manoeuvre of Tarutino

- 7 September – Battle of Borodino;
- 8 September – The Russian army began retreating east from Borodino. They camped outside Mozhaysk. When the village of Mozhaysk was captured by the French on the 9th, the Grande Armée rested for two days to recover.
- 9 September – Napoleon asked Berthier to send reinforcements from Minsk to Smolensk and from Smolensk to Moscow.
- 10 September – The main quarter of the Russian army was situated at Bolshiye Vyazyomy. Kutuzov settled in a manor on the high road to Moscow. The owner was Dmitry Golitsyn, who entered military service again. Russian sources suggest Mikhail Kutuzov wrote a number of orders and letters to Rostopchin about saving the city or the army.
- 11 September – Tsar Alexander signed a document that Kutuzov was promoted General Field Marshall, the highest military rank. Napoleon, still in Mozhaysk, wrote Marshal Victor to hurry to Moscow.
- 12 September – The main forces of Kutuzov departed from the village, now Golitsyno and camped near Odintsovo, 20 km to the west, followed by Mortier and Joachim Murat's vanguard. Eugene de Beauharnais attacked Savvino-Storozhevsky Monastery. Napoleon Bonaparte, who suffered from a cold and lost his voice, spent the night at Vyazyomy Manor (on the same sofa in the library) within 24 hours.
- 13 September – Napoleon leaves the manor house and heads east. Napoleon and Józef Poniatowski also camped near Odintsovo and invited Murat for dinner. Russian army set camp at Fili; Russian vanguard lodged nearby in Dorogomilovo. On Sunday afternoon the Russian military council at Fili discussed the risks and agreed to abandon Moscow without fighting. Leo Tolstoy wrote Rostopchin was invited also and explained the difficult decision in quite a few remarkable chapters. The troops started at once. "They were passing through Moscow from two o'clock at night, till two in the afternoon and bore away with them the wounded and the last of the inhabitants who were leaving." The civilian flight from Moscow was organized by Miloradovich while Kutuzov kept a low profile during the retreat using side streets.
- 14 September – The Russian army crossed the Moskva river near Sparrow Hills and marched through Moscow into a southeast bound road to Ryazan, followed by masses of civilians. Napoleon arrived at Poklonnaya Hill. After a ceasefire Murat's corps was the first to ride through the city, taking the Kremlin in the afternoon, leaving the inhabitants enough time to depart. First fires broke out in the evening.
- 15 September – More wind and massive fires. Napoleon arrives at Kremlin. It was seven o'clock in the evening when suddenly a shot rang out from the Kaluga Gate. The enemy blew up a powder magazine, which must have been the signal agreed upon; several rockets shoot up at once, and half an hour later a fire appeared in several blocks of the city. The wind changed direction and reached hurricane strength. Six or seven thousand little shops caught fire again.
- 16 September – By four in the morning the firestorm threatens Kremlin. Watching the fire from Kremlin Hill, Napoleon relocated to the suburban and empty Petrovsky Palace (located on the road to Saint Petersburg) in the afternoon. According to sergeant Adrien Bourgogne: "Orders had been given to shoot everyone found setting fire to houses. This order was executed at once. A little open space next to the Place du Gouvernement was called by us the Place des Pendus, as here a number of incendiaries were shot and hung on the trees."
- 18 September – Fire destroys three-quarters of the city and settling down; when it begins to rain, Napoleon returns to the Kremlin.
- 19 September – Murat lost sight of Kutuzov who changed direction and turned west to Podolsk and Tarutino where he would be more protected by the surrounding hills and the Nara river.
- 20 September – Napoleon sends a message to propose peace to the Tsar who is based in Saint Petersburg.
- 21 September – The fires are finally subsided.
- 23 September – Order given for the two battalions of the 33rd Regiment to break away. As they were daily bothered by numerous pulks of Cossacks' Napoleon ordered to clean the area and forage with the assistance of the Dutch flying squadron. On 25 September, in collaboration with German infantrymen and French dragoons, it had to sweep the area around Malye Vyaziomy.
- 24 September – Dinners were held at the Kremlin, with promotions and ribbons, and a theatre was set up.
- 26 September – After losing sight of the Russian army, Murat finally detects them near Podolsk.
- 27 September – A ball was held. Everyone put on their newly acquired clothes and drank rum punch. First snowfall of the season; the French army is suffering from famine and the cold.
- 28 September – A large supply of foodstuffs was seized at Malye Vyaziomy by Johan Frederik Wilhelm Veeren and loaded onto 26 wagons. They were pursued by Cossacks who managed to take 15 wagons.
- 3 October – Kutuzov and his entire staff arrived at Tarutino. He wanted to go even further in order to control three-pronged roads from Obninsk, so that Napoleon could not turn south or southwest.
  Kutuzov's food supplies and reinforcements were mostly coming up through Kaluga from the fertile and populous southern provinces, his new deployment gave him every opportunity to feed his men and horses and rebuild their strength. He refused to attack; he was happy for Napoleon to stay in Moscow for as long as possible, avoiding complicated movements and maneuvers.
  Kutuzov avoided frontal battles involving large masses of troops. This tactic was sharply criticized by Chief of Staff Bennigsen and others, but also by the Autocrat and Emperor Alexander. Barclay de Tolly interrupted his service for five months and settled in Nizhny Novgorod. Each side avoided the other and seemed no longer to wish to get into a fight.
- 4 October – A plan to march the French army to Saint Petersburg was given up; absolute lack of forage, limited cavalry and artillery as horses died on the spot. Murat and his cavalry arrived at Winkovo and settled near a lake, watching the Russian army, but he was forced to withdraw into a ravine. A network of Cossacks and armed peasants were killing all isolated men.
- 5 October – On order of Napoleon, the French ambassador Jacques Lauriston leaves Moscow to meet Kutuzov at his headquarters near Tarutino. Kutuzov agreed to meet, despite the orders of the Tsar. Rostopchin owned an estate near Tarutino, Russia. Robert Wilson was with him, when Rostopchin set fire to his estate.
- 7 October – Although the weather was fine and the temperature mild, not a single (French) courier from Moscow reached Vilnius, due to a lack of horses.
- 8 October – Murat personally asked Miloradovich to let his cavalry go foraging.
- 15 October – Napoleon ordered evacuation of the 12,000 sick and wounded to Smolensk.
- 17 October – French columns again passed the Nara river and proceeded to their respective destinations.
- 18 October – At dawn during breakfast, Murat's camp in a forest was surprised by an attack by forces led by Bennigsen, known as Battle of Winkovo. Bennigsen was supported by Kutuzov from his headquarters at distance. Murat loses 12 guns, 3,000 men, and 20 of his baggage carts. Bennigsen asked Kutuzov to provide troops for the pursuit. However, the General Field Marshal refused.
- 19 October – After 36 days, the French army (around 108,000) leaves Moscow at seven in the morning. Before he left, Mortier was to blow up the Kremlin, but the marshal did not have enough time to complete this task and only managed a small explosion. Napoleon made camp in the village of Troitsk, Moscow on the Desna River. Napoleon's goal was to get around Kutuzov, but on the 24th he was stopped at Maloyaroslavets on his way to Medyn and forced to go north on the 26th.

== Extent of the disaster ==
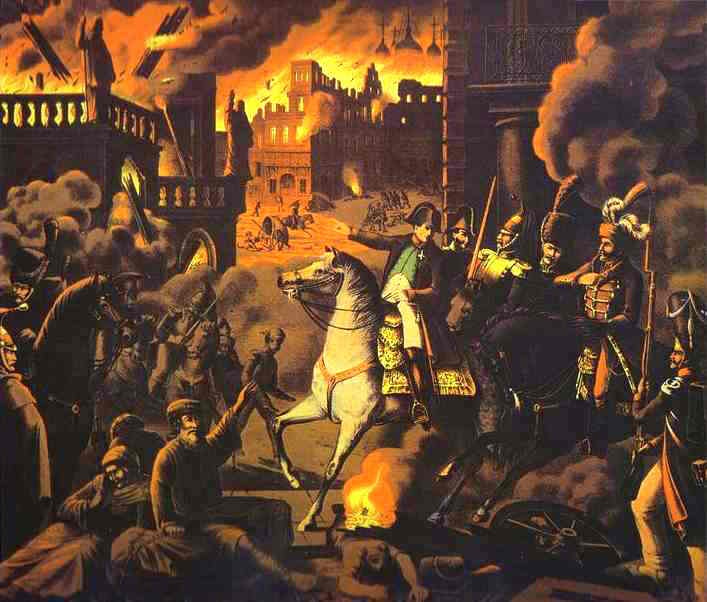
Napoleon within the burning Moscow

...In 1812, there had been approximately 4,000 stone structures and 8,000 wooden houses in Moscow. Of these, there remained after the fires only about 200 of the stone buildings and some 500 wooden houses along with about half of the 1,600 (?) churches, although nearly every church was damaged to some extent...the large number of churches that escaped total destruction by the flames is probably explained by the fact that altar implements and other paraphernalia were made of precious metals, which immediately attracted the attention of the looters. Indeed, Napoleon had a systematic sweep made for the church silver, which ended up in his war chest, the mobile treasury.

The treatment of these Russians left behind, civilians or soldiers, by the French was mixed: According to a Russian source, they destroyed monasteries and blew up architectural monuments. Moscow churches were deliberately turned into stables and latrines. Priests who did not give up church shrines were murdered savagely, nuns were raped, and stoves were fired using ancient icons. On the other hand, Napoleon personally made sure that enough food was delivered to Moscow to feed all the Russians left behind who were fed regardless of sex or age.

Still, the remaining buildings had enough space for the French army. As General Marcellin Marbot reasoned:

"It is often claimed that the fire of Moscow... was the principal cause of the failure of the 1812 campaign. This assertion seems to me to be contestable. To begin with, the destruction of Moscow was not so complete that there did not remain enough houses, palaces, churches, and barracks to accommodate the entire army [for a whole month]."

== Reconstruction of the city ==
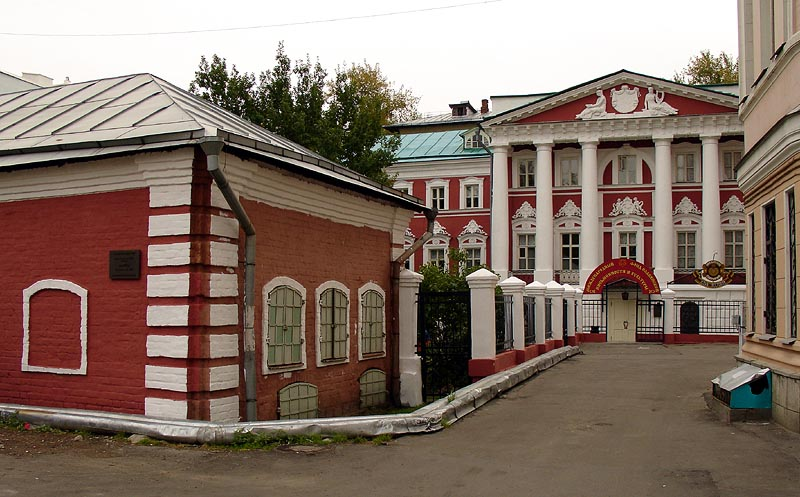
Some 18th-century buildings were rebuilt to original plans

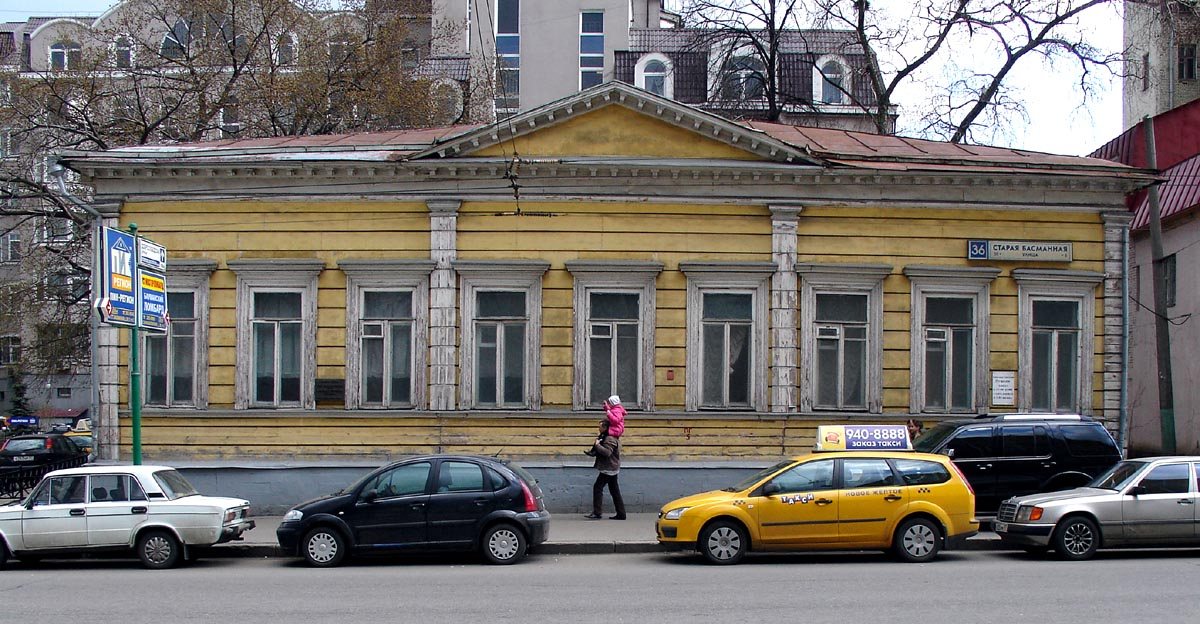
Vasily Pushkin house, a typical example of 1810s cheap wooden architecture with neoclassical trim

The process of rebuilding after the fire under military governor Alexander Tormasov (1814–1819) and Dmitry Golitsyn (1820–ca 1840) was gradual, lasting well over a decade.

== In culture ==
- Leo Tolstoy describes the occupation and fire in his novel War and Peace (Book XI).
  Tolstoy portrays the decision-making after Borodino in the first four chapters of book 11 of War and Peace. This opens with an essay on the difficulty, or maybe even the impossibility, or determining cause and effect in history. He attacks, in particular, the 'great man' theory of history, which says that events can be explained by "the actions of some one man – a king or a commander": that Kutuzov, for example, gave the order for the army to abandon Moscow to the French, and therefore they did so.
- Louise Fusil, a French actress, who was living in Russia for six years, witnessed the fire and described in her memoir the retreat.
- Kutuzov, Russian movie (1943) with English subtitles, describes also the Fire of Moscow.
- The fire was adapted into 1965–67 Soviet film War and Peace; the film crew planned out the scenes for 10 months and shot the fires with six ground cameras while also filming from helicopters.
- The fire is depicted in the 1955 film Napoléon, as well as in the 2023 film Napoleon.
- There is a Russian romance titled Russian: Шумел, горел пожар московский, romanized: Shumel, gorel pozhar moskovsky, lit. 'The Moscow fire roared and burned' inconclusively attributed to Nikolay Sokolov, a philosophical musing about the fickle fate, Napoleon being an example. A variant of the last stanza of the romance is:

Russian text	Transliteration	English translation
Судьба играет человеком, Она изменчива всегда, То вознесет его высоко, То бросит в бездну без стыда.	Sudba igraet chekovekom Ona izmenchiva vsegda To voznesyet ego vysoko To brosit v bezdnu bez styda.	Fate plays with man, She is always capricious, She would lift him high, And then throw him shamelessly into an abyss.

The line "Fate plays with man" has become a Russian catchphrase.

There are a number of paintings about the event.

== Bibliography ==
- Austin, Paul Britten (2012). 1812: Napoleon in Moscow (2nd ed.). Barnsley, England: Frontline Books. ISBN 978-1-4738-1139-3 – via Google Books.
- Bourgogne, Adrien Jean Baptiste François (1899). Cottin, Paul (ed.). Memoirs of Sergeant Bourgogne, 1812–1813 (2nd ed.). New York: Doubleday & McClure Company. LCCN 99001646 – via Internet Archive.
- Caulaincourt, Armand-August-Louis de (1935). Libaire, George; Morrow, William (eds.). With Napoleon in Russia: The memoirs of General de Caulaincourt, Duke of Vicenza. New York: William Morrow and Company, Inc – via Internet Archive.
- Haythornthwaite, Philip; et al. (Illustrations and graphics by Peter Dennis) (2012). Cowper, Marcus (ed.). Borodino 1812: Napoleon's great gamble. Campaign. Vol. 246. London: Bloomsbury Publishing. ISBN 978-1-84908-697-4 – via Google Books.
- Lieven, Dominic (2009). Dohle, Markus; Wright, Deborah; Weldon, Tom; Prior, Joanna (eds.). Russia Against Napoleon: The Battle for Europe, 1807 to 1814. London: Allen Lane (Penguin Books). ISBN 978-0-14-194744-0. OCLC 419644822 – via Google Books.
- Marbot, Jean-Baptiste Antoine Marcelin (1913) [1891]. The memoirs of General Baron de Marbot, late lieutenant-general in the French army. Vol. I. Translated by Butler, Arthur John (5th ed.). London: Longmans, Green, and Co – via Internet Archive.
- Ludwig, Emil (1927). Allen, George (ed.). Napoleon. Translated by Eden, Paul; Cedar, Paul (7th ed.). London: Unwin Brothers Ltd – via Internet Archive.
- Riehn, Richard K. (1990). 1812: Napoleon's Russian campaign. New York: McGraw-Hill. ISBN 978-0-07-052731-7. LCCN 89028432. OCLC 20563997 – via Internet Archive.
- Taylor, Ella (27 June 2019). Mulvaney, John; Turell, Saul J.; Becker, William J. (eds.). "War and Peace: Saint Petersburg Fiddles, Moscow Burns". The Criterion Collection. Essays. New York: The Criterion Collection, Inc. (Janus Films). Archived from the original on 3 July 2019.
- Staël-Holstein, Anne Louise Germain de (1821). de Staël-Holstein, Augustus (ed.). Ten Years' Exile; or Memoirs of that Interesting Period of the Life of the Baroness de Staël-Holstein. London: Treuttel and Würtz/Hewlett & Brimmer, Printers. OCLC 5938603 – via Internet Archive.
- Vionnet, Louis Joseph (2013). With Napoleon's Guard in Russia: The Memoirs of Major Vionnet, 1812. Casemate Publishers. ISBN 978-1-78340-898-6 – via Google Books.
- Zamoyski, Adam (2004) [1980]. Moscow 1812: Napoleon's Fatal March (2nd ed.). New York: HarperCollins. ISBN 978-0-06-107558-2. LCCN 2004047575. OCLC 55067008 – via Internet Archive.
- US DOD (2021). "delaying operation".
