= Curse of Simba =

1965 British film by Lindsay Shonteff

- Australian theatrical release poster
- Directed by: Lindsay Shonteff
- Screenplay by: Brian Clemens (as "Tom O'Grady"); Leigh Vance
- Produced by: Richard Gordon
- Starring: Bryant Haliday; Dennis Price
- Cinematography: Gerald Gibbs
- Music by: Brian Fahey
- Production company: Gala Film
- Distributed by: Allied Artists
- Release date: September 22, 1965 ((USA)
- Running time: 77 min (UK); 61 min (US)
- Country: UK
- Language: English
- Budget: £50,000

Curse of Simba (also known as Voodoo Blood Death; U.S. title: Curse of the Voodoo), is a black-and-white 1965 British-American supernatural horror film directed by Lindsay Shonteff and starring Bryant Haliday and Dennis Price. The screenplay was by Brian Clemens (as Tom O'Grady) and it was produced by Kenneth Rive.

In the United States where it was shown as the second film on a double feature with the low-budget US science fiction movie Frankenstein Meets the Space Monster (1965).

The film follows a white hunter who brings a curse home to England after enraging the Simbazi, an African tribe, by killing one of the lions that the tribe venerates. To break the curse and live, he must return to Africa and kill the tribal chief who put it on him.

== Plot ==
Alcoholic Mike Stacey is leading a safari when one of the hunters, Radlett, wounds a lion. Mike says he now must kill it, but Major Lomas warns him that they are on Simbazi land and, as the Simbazi worship lions, Mike will be cursed. Mike scoffs at the notion and heads out with his native guide Saidi. Mike kills the lion but gets mauled in the process.

The Simbazi chief, Simbaza, and several warriors arrive at the safari camp. Spotting the lion skin stretched on a rack, Simbaza curses Mike by thrusting a spear into the ground at his feet.

The next morning, to Mike's dismay, the safari packs up to return to Johannesburg. Most of the bearers have run off during the night, frightened by the curse. As they drive through the bush, Saidi attempts to stab Mike, who has lost consciousness from his injuries. Saidi and Lomas struggle. Lomas wins; Saidi runs away.

In Johannesburg, Major and Mrs. Lomas arrange to meet Mike at a nightclub. There, it is explained that Janet, Mike's wife, has left him, taking their son Tommy to her mother's home in London. When a drunken Mike shows up, Mrs. Lomas tells him that he ought to go home and save his marriage.

Mike later insists Janet meet him that night in the bar of his hotel to discuss their future. Janet stands him up, and Mike hooks up with a woman at the bar. He goes to her flat with her but passes out on her bed as soon as they arrive. He has a nightmare about Saidi, who at that moment is being held captive by Simbazi tribesmen. At 4:00 a.m., Mike walks back to his hotel, but a lion seemingly stalks him. He returns to the woman's flat later that day. She says that she too heard a lion – but, then, she lives only 500 yards from the zoo.

Mike again invites Janet out for a drink and a chat. As they sit at their table, Mike sees Simbaza wearing a suit, tie, and hat, looking at him. Janet sees nothing. Mike follows Simbaza through the streets of London and onto a bus. When Mike gets aboard, Simbaza has vanished. When Mike sits down and looks over his shoulder, Simbaza is sitting behind him. Mike looks away, and when he glances back, Simbaza has again disappeared.

At his hotel that night, Mike is awakened by someone rattling his room's doorknob. He grabs his revolver, opens the door, sees Simbaza, pushes him away, and fires four rounds through the closed door. Janet is called by a Police Inspector, who explains what has happened and confiscates Mike's pistol.

Mike is next pursued across a misty Hampstead Heath by two Simbazi warriors carrying spears and in native dress. He wakes up in his hotel room after this, being treated by a doctor. Janet tells the doctor about Mike's hallucinations, which he says could be caused by his alcoholism, his infected wounds, or probably both. Janet declares that she will nurse Mike back to health. That night, Simbaza peers through Mike's window, still in city clothes, and Mike has another nightmare about Saidi, who is still being held captive.

After three days of care, the doctor recommends that Mike be committed to a mental institution. Janet refuses to do so and instead consults a Simbazi expert, who tells her the only way Mike will survive the curse is to return to Africa and kill the man who had put it on him.

Mike and Janet go back to Africa. They meet Lomas at a bush camp. Mike turns down Lomas' offer of help and sets out alone. He finds tribesmen stomping Saidi and shoots, killing one of them while the others scatter.

Mike and Simbaza stalk each other through the jungle. Mike eventually runs Simbaza down with a World War II vintage Dodge WC series truck, crushing him between a front wheel and the frame. Simbaza is dead; the curse is broken. Mike and Saidi walk away, both now free.

== Cast ==
- Bryant Haliday as Mike Stacey (in credits as Bryant Halliday)
- Dennis Price as Major Lomas
- Lisa Daniely as Janet Stacey (in credits as Lisa Danielly)
- Mary Kerridge as Janet's Mother
- Ronald Leigh-Hunt as doctor (in credits as Ronald Leigh Hunt)
- Jean Lodge as Mrs Lomas
- Dennis Alba Peters as Saidi
- Danny Daniels as Simbaza
- Tony Thawnton as Radlett
- Michael Nightingale as second hunter
- John Witty as Police Inspector
- Andy Meyers as Tommy Stacey
- Louis Mahoney as Africane expert
- Jimmy Felgate as barman
- Nigel Feyisetan as Simbaza in London
- Beryl Cunningham as nightclub dancer
- Valli Newby as nightclub pickup
- Bobby Breen Quintet as nightclub band

== Production ==
As a follow-up to Devil Doll (1964) executive producer Richard Gordon and director Shonteff selected a screenplay by Brian Clemens (written under the pseudonym 'Tom O'Grady' and with additional dialogue and scenes by Leigh Vance) originally titled The Lion Man for their star performer Haliday. Though set in Africa, outdoor sequences were filmed in London's Regent's Park and stock footage of African fauna was extensively used. Gordon defended the use of stock footage, saying in an interview that it is 'one of the ways to make low-budget pictures - to have plenty of running time, without having to do a lot of complicated shooting'. However, as British film historian John Hamilton points out, in Curse of Simba, the stock footage is 'poorly integrated and reinforces the slap-dash feel of the production'. He says the film is Gordon's 'least favourite of the pictures [he has] worked on'. Interiors were shot at Shepperton Studios.

Production began in April 1964 as a joint project of the UK's Galaworld Films and the American Gordon Films Inc. The movie was originally budgeted at £35,000 and meant to be shot in four weeks, but because, as Gordon said in an interview, 'The weather really botched things up and sort of depressed everybody', it ended up being completed a week over schedule and £15,000 over budget. But even at £50,000, it was 'still less than $150,000' at the time.

There is disagreement about the rating and running time of Curse of Simba in the UK. Hamilton includes the film in X-Cert: The British Independent Horror Film 1951-1970 at a running time of 77 minutes. But the BBFC website shows an A-certification, which was granted on 27 May 1965, and a run time of exactly 61 minutes 51 seconds. At the time, an X-cert would have restricted showing the movie only to theatre-goers of age 16 or older; an A-cert, which was less strict, had no age restrictions but meant that the film was 'more suitable for adults' than children. Bryan Senn, an American film historian, writes that 'in England, the picture was trimmed by 10 minutes in order to fit the distributor's need for a shorter supporting feature', while British film historian Phil Hardy lists alternate run times of 77 and 61 minutes, but without noting if different countries got different run times. The British website Colonialfilms.org lists a running time of 61 minutes.

In the US, the film's runtime is usually listed as 77 minutes. Senn, however, disagrees with the others on both the UK and the US running time, listing them instead as 66 minutes for the UK print and 82 minutes for the US print.

The unnamed reviewer at Blackhorrormovies.com wonders if the only Caucasian person in the Bobby Breen Quintet, which performs during the nightclub scene, is the same Bobby Breen who was a well-known child singer and actor during the 1930s. Curse of Simba is the only film in which the quintet appears, according to the BFI filmography of the band. The New York Times obituary for the Bobby Breen who had been a child star notes that while he continued recording into the 1960s - he was under contract to Motown then - no recordings of his from the 1960s have been released. The obituary makes no mention of Curse of Simba.

Senn also notes that both Haliday's and Daniely's names were misspelled on US prints of Curse of the Voodoo. Both were given 'a superfluous "l"' in their surnames, so that Allied Artists listed them in the credits as 'Halliday' and 'Danielly'. Senn writes, 'Fortunately, Mr Haliday didn't notice'.

Although production started in 1964, the vehicles used in the safari scenes are World War II-era Willys MB Jeeps and a 1942 Dodge WC 56 ¾-Ton (1500-lb) Command/Reconnaissance Car, with which Mike runs over Simbaza at the climax of the film.

== Distribution ==
Curse of Simba was distributed in the UK by Gala Film Distributors Ltd and Curse of the Voodoo in the US by Allied Artists.

== Exhibition ==
Curse of the Voodoo was first shown in the US on 22 September 1965 in Ohio. It opened in Los Angeles almost four months later, on 12 January 1966.

The film was released to US television as Curse of the Voodoo in November 1966, a little more than a year after it first appeared in theatres. It was part of a 12-film package titled 'Teleworld 12' and syndicated to local TV stations by Teleworld itself. It was still being broadcast in the late 1970s; e.g. on WNEW-TV in New York on 7 January 1978.

Curse of the Voodoo has been released on DVD in the US three times for home viewing by the same company, Elite Entertainment. It was first issued as a single disc on 4 May 1999, then included in four-disc packs titled Halloween 2002, released 29 October 2002, and The British Horror Collection, released 3 February 2004. The three other films in both packs were Tower of Evil (1972), Horror Hospital (1973) and Inseminoid (1981).

== Reception ==
The Monthly Film Bulletin wrote: "A turgid piece of nonsense, filmed for the most part in what appears to be Epping Forest and Wimbledon Common, and incorporating stock animal footage. The script is composed exclusively of clichés, and the direction staggers from TV close-up to TV close-up with paralysing incompetence."

While Haliday's obituary calls the film "faintly racist", Hardy describes it as "a crudely racist story". The anonymous reviewer for Blackhorrormovies.com writes, "Wow. Could this be any more offensive? It opens documentary-style with a voiceover (and a montage of booga-booga tribesmen and wild animals devouring each other): 'Africa: A country [?!] that for centuries was hidden from civilised man (...) Africa: Where primitive people still practise evil religions which weave a dark web of death around all those who sin against their gods'". The reviewer further points out that Major Lomas describes the Simbazi by saying, "These people are further from civilisation than Stone Age men".

The BoxOffice magazine review of 13 December 1965 says that "for the undemanding audience" which seems to "relish such goings-on, it's not disappointing fare", and that '"it's as actionful as anything that's preceded this import". As such, BoxOffice rated the film as "good" on its very-poor-to-excellent scale, while noting that Variety and Parents' Magazine gave it the lower rating of "fair".

Hamilton writes: "Not surprisingly, given the tight shooting time and forced rescheduling, the film exhibits a rushed and amateurish feel". He continues: "The cramped sets (...) look bland and somewhat seedy, and the flat lighting and unimaginative camerawork only compound the impression of watching a rather dull TV drama". Hamilton is also of the opinion that Regent's Park is a poor substitute for anywhere in Africa.

Senn writes that "It's difficult to dislike Curse of the Voodoo, mostly because of its sheer earnestness (...) Yet it's almost nearly as difficult to like the film, for its slow pace and cranky characters possess little appeal", and for the visual problems inherent in having "London-area woodlands standing in for the Dark Continent". He calls the movie "a deadly serious film with no touch of whimsy or camp about it". Senn also says that Daniely has "seemingly disavowed her film work, claiming not to remember anything about it" but 'Money' was her terse reply when asked what attracted her to Curse of the Voodoo and 'crap' her evaluation of it".
