= The Projected Man =

1966 British film by Ian Curteis

- British release poster
- Directed by: Ian Curteis; Uncredited: John Croydon
- Written by: Peter Bryan; John C. Cooper; Frank Quattrocchi
- Produced by: John Croydon; Maurice Foster
- Starring: Mary Peach; Bryant Haliday; Norman Wooland; Ronald Allen; Derek Farr; Tracey Crisp
- Cinematography: Stanley Pavey
- Edited by: Derek Holding
- Music by: Kenneth V. Jones
- Production companies: Compton Productions; MLC Productions
- Distributed by: Compton-Cameo Films (UK); Universal Pictures (US)
- Release date: 1966 (UK)
- Running time: 90 minutes
- Country: United Kingdom
- Language: English
- Budget: £100,000

The Projected Man is a 1966 British science fiction film directed by Ian Curteis, written by Peter Bryan, John C. Cooper, and Frank Quattrocchi, and starring Bryant Haliday, Mary Peach, Norman Wooland, Ronald Allen, and Derek Farr.

It was released in the United States by Universal Studios, as a double bill with Island of Terror. The plot revolves around a scientist, Dr. Paul Steiner, experimenting with matter teleportation by means of a laser device. However, after a failed attempt at projecting himself, he becomes a disfigured monster who embarks on a murderous rampage.

Discovered by Alex Gordon as an unproduced screenplay by Hollywood writer Frank Quattrocchi, The Projected Man was directed by Ian Curteis, who had been approached following the BBC's transmission of a television film he had directed. He took the job despite reservations about a rigidly tight four-week shooting contract and an inadequate budget. After four weeks the finance ran out and producer John Croydon took over the direction, unpaid and meeting the remaining financial demands himself in order to complete the film. However, Croydon remained uncredited as the producers did not wish to publicise the problems which had occurred on set.

The Projected Man has received mixed reviews. Several sources were critical of the film's resemblance to other science fiction films, with The Fly and 4D Man being singled out by critics and moviegoers alike as possible inspirations, although the film's executive producer Richard Gordon has denied this. The Projected Man was featured in a ninth-season episode of comedy television series Mystery Science Theater 3000, and has been released on DVD by Cinema Club.

== Plot ==
Dr. Paul Steiner and Dr. Christopher Mitchell work on a projection device that enables them to transmit any object within a few miles of the machine. While they find the device works with inanimate objects, the living creatures they use it on always seem to die. When Dr. Patricia Hill arrives, she helps them fix the error, making Steiner think the problem has been solved. Meanwhile, Dr. Blanchard, Steiner's boss and head of the institute for which he works, is being blackmailed by Mr. Latham, who wants credit for Steiner's discovery. He forces Blanchard to demand Steiner to give a premature presentation to Professor Lembach.

Steiner, Mitchell, and Hill feel they are ready to present, but at the event, Blanchard places acid on the machine when everyone is unaware, causing an explosion. The funding for Steiner's project is ended instantly; however, Mitchell later discovers that the device has been tampered with. Steiner goes to Blanchard's house, where Lembach and Latham are having dinner. He presents the men with the evidence that his machine was deliberately tampered with, and Lembach allows him to have another chance. Steiner decides to try to project himself to Lembach's house, and, with help from his secretary, Sheila, he begins the procedure. However, right then, Mitchell and Hill return to the laboratory.

The two try to convince Sheila to stop the projection, but as she is inexperienced with the device, she instead ends up projecting Steiner to somewhere else. He ends up at a construction site, the hideout of a band of thieves who are attempting to break into a bank. It is learned that an error in the projection has given Steiner the ability to kill people by touching them, and has mutilated one half of his body. Steiner kills the criminals, and then enters a store, where he steals a pair of rubber gloves and a coat. He then breaks into the institute, where he finds Latham and kills him. He also destroys the building's power supply, alerting Hill and Mitchell that something is wrong. By this time, Inspector Davis has discovered the bodies of the criminals and is determined to stop Steiner.

Sheila is kidnapped by Steiner, who interrogates her in her apartment. She reveals that Blanchard and Latham planned against him, angering Steiner. Before leaving, Steiner sets Sheila's apartment on fire with her inside (unaware that she survives) and goes to hide at Blanchard's house. When Blanchard returns home, he is killed by Steiner. Meanwhile, Davis has examined Latham's body and realizes that the electric marks left on Latham were the same as the criminals. Steiner shows up at Hill's house, where he finds her and Mitchell. Steiner demands that they tell him where he can find more electricity, since after the projection he needs energy to survive. Hill and Mitchell try to convince him to return to the laboratory so they can try reversing the projection, but Steiner rebuffs them and leaves toward a power plant.

Davis, Hill, and Mitchell find him rumbling around in the power plant. Davis tries to kill him, but Steiner resists his bullets, so Hill again tries to persuade Steiner to return to the laboratory. Steiner is eventually convinced, so he goes with them, but when he arrives, he tricks them and begins destroying things. With the laboratory on fire and the projection device wildly out of control, Steiner is hit by the projection device's laser, causing him to disappear as the fire rages on.

== Cast ==
- Bryant Haliday as Dr. Paul Steiner
- Mary Peach as Dr. Patricia Hill
- Norman Wooland as Dr. L.G. Blanchard
- Ronald Allen as Dr. Chris Mitchell
- Derek Farr as Inspector Davis
- Tracey Crisp as Sheila Andersen
- Derrick De Marney as Latham
- Gerard Heinz as Prof. Lembach
- Sam Kydd as Harry Slinger
- Terry Scully as Steve Lowe
- Norma West as Gloria King
- Frank Gatliff as Dr. Wilson
- John Watson as Sgt. Martin
- Alfred Joint as security man
- Rosemary Donnelly as girl
- David Scheuer as boy

== Production ==
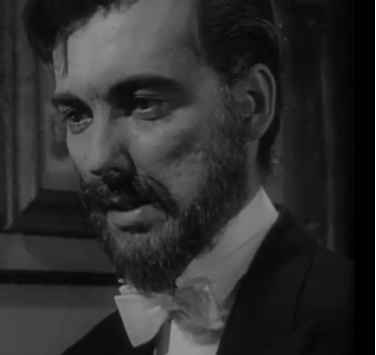
Bryant Haliday, pictured here in Devil Doll, was a fan of horror films and enjoyed acting in The Projected Man.

The Projected Man was discovered as an unproduced screenplay by film producer Alex Gordon. The script was written by Frank Quattrocchi, a Hollywood screenwriter, and was originally set in the United States. Gordon sent it to his brother Richard, also a film producer. Richard enjoyed reading it, but had it re-written to be set in London. He would serve as producer on the film. Ian Curteis was hired to direct The Projected Man, which would be his first theatrical film, as all of his previous work had been in television. Curteis was hired at the insistence of producer John Croydon, who was confident that Curteis would later become a success.

These were the kind of people that we could get for pictures, and even though their names may not have meant anything in the United States or elsewhere, they gave the pictures a lot of extra weight in the U.K.

— Producer Richard Gordon on the casting of the film.

The movie was 50% financed by Compton, the company run by Tony Tenser and Michael Klinger.

Bryant Haliday was cast in the lead role as Professor Steiner. He was chosen for the role as Gordon was opposed to a British actor playing the title role, and the budget would not allow a Hollywood star to be used. The fact that Gordon was already familiar with him, as he had cast him in Curse of Simba and Devil Doll, was also a factor. Haliday, a fan of horror movies, enjoyed doing The Projected Man. British stage actress Mary Peach was cast in the lead role as Dr. Patricia Hill. It was insisted that she be given top billing for her role. Norman Wooland, a German-born British character actor, was cast as Dr. Blanchard, the film's villain. Derek Farr portrays Inspector Davis, and Ronald Allen plays the role of Dr. Christopher Mitchell. A scene in the film features actress Norma West lying topless on a morgue table; this scene was added to aid sales overseas.

Curteis ran into several problems while directing the film. Owing to his absence of feature film experience, the film's tight schedule, and limited funding, he became quickly overwhelmed, and The Projected Man started going over its budget and falling behind on schedule. Executive producers Tony Tenser and Michael Klinger threatened to take over production as they did not want to increase the budget. Since Croydon had hired Curteis, it became his responsibility to fire him and finish directing the film. Richard Gordon suggested that "I think Curteis was relieved to step out because he simply didn't know any longer what to do." Croydon was not credited for his directing work on the film; as Gordon said, "one tries not to publicize such incidents."

== Release ==
The Projected Man was released in the United Kingdom by Compton-Cameo Films Ltd in the summer of 1966 with an X-certificate, then suitable for patrons aged over 16.

The Projected Man was shot at the same time as Island of Terror, with which it was released on a double bill. The idea of the double bill came to Richard Gordon when he ran Island of Terror for Universal Studios' executive in charge, Hi Martin. As The Projected Man's special effects were not yet finished, Gordon showed Martin Island of Terror. Martin enjoyed the film and obtained the American rights for a "very large sum of money." As Gordon was not keen on the idea of Island of Terror being placed at the bottom of the bill with one of Universal's other features, which he described as "no good for [our production company] financially," he proposed adding a second film, noting that The Projected Man was nearing completion. He showed an unfinished workprint of the film to see if Martin was interested, and he enjoyed it enough to accept the deal. When The Projected Man was shown in theatres in the United States, it was cut thirteen minutes shorter than the original British print, due to the fact that Universal felt the opening scene, which depicted a rehearsal for an experiment which came later in the film, was "repetitive." They also did not want a double bill with a duration of over three hours, and did not want to edit Island of Terror, so The Projected Man was trimmed to provide an exact 180-minute running time.

=== Home media ===
In 2006, The Projected Man was released on DVD by Cinema Club. Shout! Factory released the movie on Blu-ray in 2018.

== Reception ==
A review in entertainment industry magazine Variety praised The Projected Man, writing that the screenplay "is a mosaic compiled from other films but the pieces hang together fairly well." However, Variety criticised the character's motives, saying that "the origin and motives of the third party are never fully explained." The magazine wrote that the performances in the film were "generally good," and that "the characters do not fall prey to the usual cliches."

Writing for Ottawa Citizen, Gordon Stoneham, reviewing the double bill of The Projected Man and Island of Terror, called The Projected Man "dreadful stuff," saying that the film was "badly written, woodenly acted, and abounding in the cliches of the horror film genre." However, he wrote that "it is short and to the point" and wrote that "although it trods a familiar path, every now and then it comes up with some arresting bit of cinematic coloring that rivels the attention." Comparing the two films, he stated that The Projected Man was "the best."

A TV Guide review wrote that the "characters are better portrayed than usual in films of this nature, keeping the actors from becoming mere stereotypes" and that "subtle artistic direction and first-quality special effects give this picture a strong visual presence." The review graded The Projected Man with two stars out of four.

The anonymous reviewer for the British Kinematograph Weekly called the cast "competent" and noted that, while the "plot [was] at least as old as H. G. Wells", there was something about the film that would challenge the "hard-boiled child of today".

Many reviews were critical of the film's resemblance to The Fly. British magazine Time Out later pointed it out, as did TV Guide. Audiences also noted that it was similar to the 1959 science fiction film 4D Man. In a 2000 interview with Video Watchdog, Richard Gordon stated "we weren't really influenced by The Fly" and wrote in the 2006 book Interviews with B Science Fiction and Horror Movie Makers that "Projected Man does have a very strong similarity to The Fly, but it came to us as a finished screenplay and seemed to be a perfectly logical film to make."

=== Mystery Science Theater 3000 ===
The Projected Man was the premiere episode of Mystery Science Theater 3000's ninth season. The episode debuted 14 March 1998, on the Sci-Fi Channel. MST3K writer Paul Chaplin says Haliday possessed "a crippling lack of screen presence" and that if "Haliday was considered to be someone who could carry a film ... [then] in mid-1960s England they must have been about three million years behind the music."

Paste writer Jim Vorel ranked the episode #147 (out of the then-191 nationally-aired MST3K episodes). Vorel calls it "dumb British sci-fi horror film" and says, "The riffs focus heavily on the snooty, foppish, brandy-quaffing British character actors, and are variable in quality." The episode did not make the Top 100 list of episodes as voted upon by MST3K Season 11 Kickstarter backers.

The MST3K version of The Projected Man was included as part of the Mystery Science Theater 3000, Volume XXX DVD collection, released by Shout! Factory on 29 July 2014. The other episodes in the four-disc set include The Black Scorpion (episode #113), Outlaw (episode #519), and It Lives by Night (episode #1010). The Projected Man disc also included the featurette Shock to the System: Creating the Projected Man.
