= House of A. I. Lobkova =

- Дом А. И. Лобковой
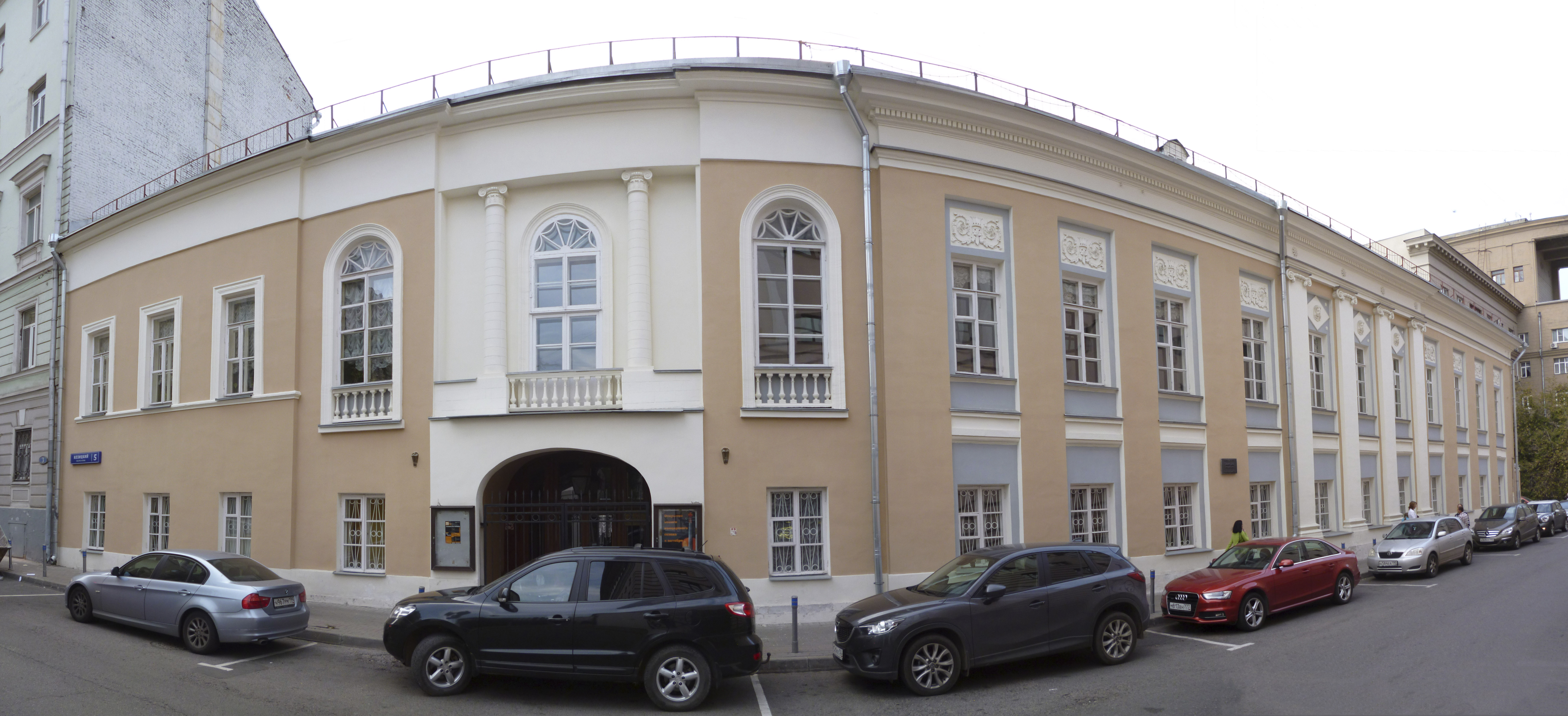
- Interactive map of the House of A. I. Lobkova area

General information
- Location: Moscow, Kozitskiy pereulok, 5
- Coordinates: 55°45′54″N 37°36′34″E

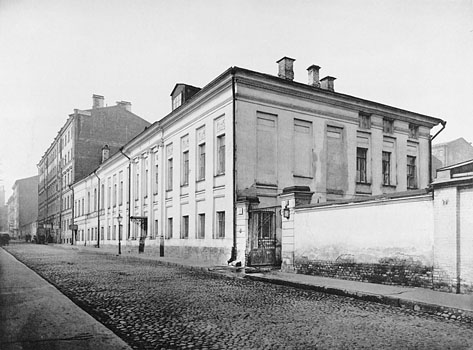
House of A. I. Lobkova in 1913

The House of AI Lobkova (Russian: Дом А. И. Лобковой) is located in the center of Moscow (Kozitsky Pereulok, house 5). It was built in the late 18th century. It has the status of an object of cultural heritage of federal significance. At present the house is occupied by the State Institute of Art Studies.

== History ==
In the late 1780s, the retired Lieutenant General F. M. Shestakov acquired a plot of several possessions in Kozitsky lane. He ordered the architect M. F. Kazakov to build a stone mansion. Initially, only the right part of the current building and the wing on the left side were built. After the death of F. M. Shestakov, the house was inherited by his relative V. D. Lobkov. After the death of Lobkov in 1795, his widow Anna Ivanovna Lobkova completed the manor house, and it has acquired a modern look. Her son, S. A. Sobolevsky, bibliographer and friend Alexander Pushkin spent his childhood in this house.

The house was not damaged during the fire of 1812. In 1820, A. I. Lobkova sold her house to Prince B. A. Golitsyn, but remained in it to live as a tenant. In 1828, the owner of the house became a state Councilor V. A. Glebova, who passed it to hire. In 1860, the owner of the mansion was the architect M. O. Lopyrevsky. Under him, the apartments were still rented. Apartments in this building at different times shot the singer E. P. Ritchie, historian V. O. Klyuchevsky, the actor I. V. Samarin, an economist at the I. K. Babst. At the end of the 19th century the printing house of the Moscow city public administration was opened.

In the 1920s, the house was adapted for the campus of the universities. The poet A. T. Tvardovsky lived in this hostel. Since the 1960s, the building has housed the Institute of art of the Academy of Sciences. The house of A. I. Lobkova and its interiors were restored under the guidance of architect A. V. Okha.

== Architecture ==
The oldest part of the building is allocated with vertical niches and ionic pilaster portico. The later left part (wing) has a narrow facade with three Windows. A few years later, the wing and the main house were connected by a two-storey building with an arched entrance to the yard. The facade is decorated with stucco. Above the Windows of the second floor there are symmetrical ornamental compositions, and above the Windows of the portico there are heads in diamonds.

The main entrance to the building was originally in its central part, and after the reconstruction it is located in the archway and leads to the lobby with a staircase. The living room of the second floor with an oval alcove is well preserved.
