= Paul Robeson: Tribute to an Artist =

1979 film

- Directed by: Saul J. Turell
- Written by: Saul J. Turell
- Produced by: Jessica Berman; Saul J. Turell
- Starring: Paul Robeson; Sidney Poitier
- Narrated by: Sidney Poitier
- Edited by: Donald P. Finamore
- Distributed by: Janus Films
- Release date: 1979
- Running time: 30 minutes
- Country: United States
- Language: English

Paul Robeson: Tribute to an Artist is a 1979 American short documentary film directed by Saul J. Turell. In 1980, it won an Oscar at the 52nd Academy Awards for Documentary Short Subject. It was released alongside Robeson's other films on a Criterion Collection box set in 2007.

== Production ==
The film was directed by Saul J. Turell, a filmmaker most well known for his work in preservation, distribution, and celebration of older films through his work in the companies Sterling Films and Janus Films. Turell had decided to create the film after feeling a frustration that Robeson was so little known in the 1970's. Following research, he decided to focus on the changing meaning and lyrics of Robeson's performances "Ol' Man River" as a guiding point for the story.

== Cast ==
- Paul Robeson as himself (archive footage)
- Sidney Poitier as narrator (voice)
- Margaret Webster as herself - director of Othello (voice, uncredited, and archive footage)
