= William J. Becker =

American theatre critic (1927–2015)

Arthur William John Becker III (May 23, 1927 – September 12, 2015) was an American theatre critic and film distributor.

== Education ==
He was born in St. Louis, Missouri to Margaret Heath and Arthur Becker Jr. Becker first attended Washington University in St. Louis, where he began writing to Henry Miller. Becker transferred to Duke University, then Harvard, where he met George Plimpton. He next studied abroad as a Rhodes Scholar at Wadham College, Oxford, earning a Ph.D.

== Career ==
Becker's service with the United States Navy sent him to Guam. He spent the 1950s writing for The Hudson Review, where he met Roger L. Stevens, who later financed Becker's acquisition of Playbill. In 1965, Becker and Saul J. Turell partnered to buy Janus Films from founders Bryant Haliday and Cyrus Harvey, Jr.

== Personal ==
Becker was married to Patricia Birch, with whom he had three children, including the photographer Jonathan Becker.

Becker died of kidney failure on September 12, 2015, in Southampton, New York at the age of 88.
