= Crabtree & Evelyn =

American retailer of body and home products

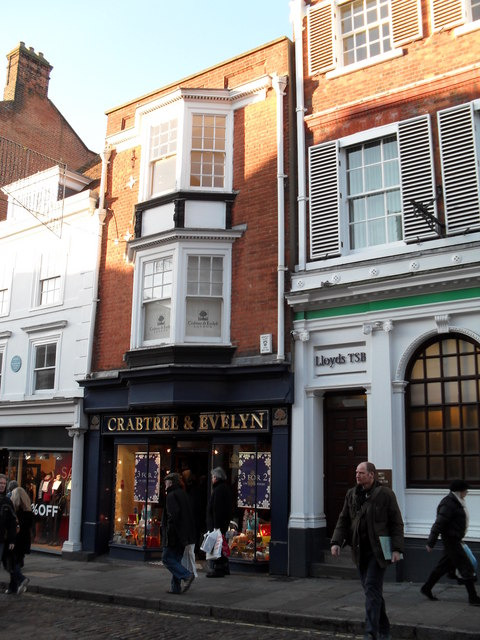
Crabtree & Evelyn in Guildford High Street

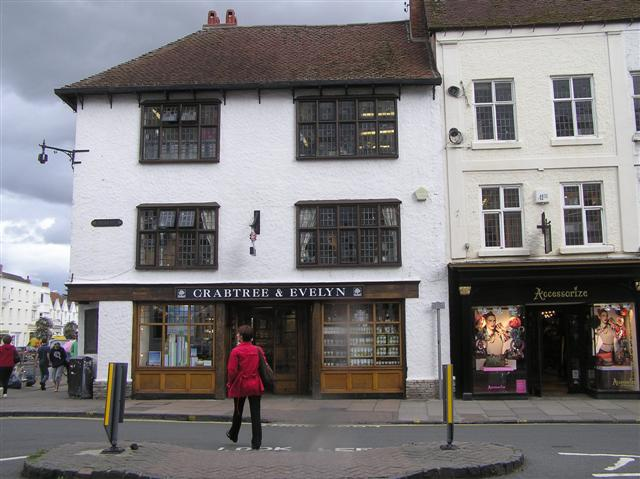
Crabtree & Evelyn, Stratford on Avon

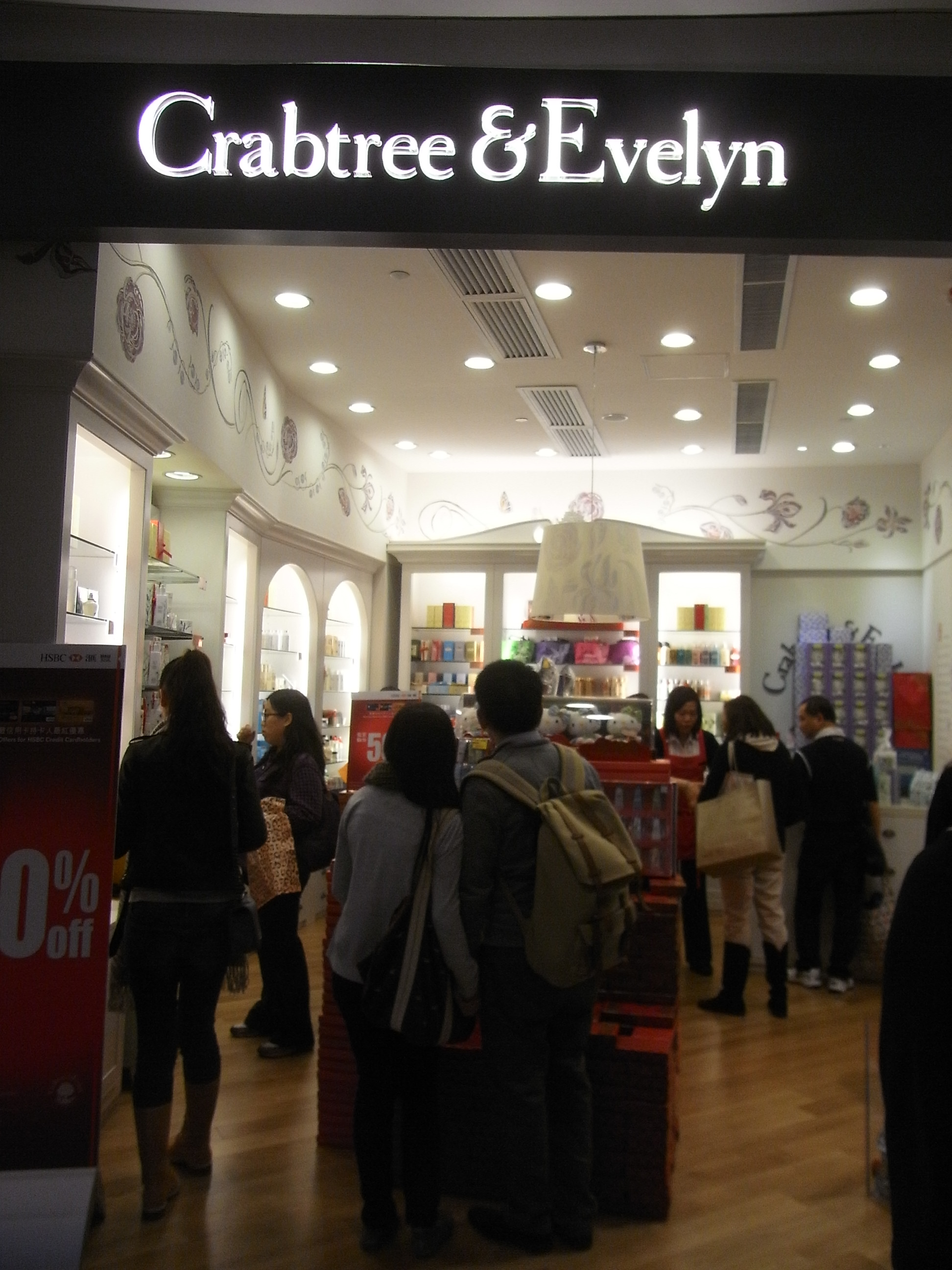
Crabtree & Evelyn, Hong Kong

Crabtree & Evelyn is a brand of personal care products currently based in London, England. It began as an American retail chain in 1971 that grew to be a successful multi-national company.

The founders sold the chain in 1996, and the brand was subsequently resold multiple times.

The brick and mortar stores became increasingly unprofitable, with numerous closings in 2009. It was announced in November 2018 that all retail and wholesale operations were to cease to exist worldwide in 2019.

The brand relaunched on 16 July 2019 as an exclusively online store. The US website stopped all sales in February 2022, and has remained dormant since, while the Malaysian branch is operational.

== Founding ==
Crabtree & Evelyn was founded in Cambridge, Massachusetts, in 1955 by Janus Films co-founder Cyrus Harvey. The enterprise began as a small shop in Cambridge under the name The Soap Box.

In 1971, Harvey met English designer Peter Windett while in London and the two started a 25 year business partnership, changing the company's name to Crabtree & Evelyn. In 1977, the company opened a stall in Faneuil Hall in Boston, and its first stand alone shop was opened by Stephen Miller in the Montgomery Mall in Montgomeryville, Pennsylvania. Harvey invented the products, while Windett designed the packaging and other branding. American tourists looked for the store in England, prompting the founders to open their first store on Kensington Church Street in 1980. Over time, many more locations were added in the US and UK, and new stores also opened in several European countries, Canada, Hong Kong, Malaysia, Singapore, and Australia.

The company's name, conceived by Harvey and Windett, paid homage to John Evelyn, a 17th-century English author, gardener, and diarist. The brand's original logo depicted a wild apple tree, from which the company gets the former element of its name (in the United States, wild apple trees are known as crab-apple trees).

=== Acquisitions ===
In 1996, Cyrus Harvey sold Crabtree & Evelyn to the Malaysian holding company Kuala Lumpur Kepong Berhad, which created the subsidiary CE Holdings. While funded and managed in Kuala Lumpur, day-to-day operations—such as research and development, manufacturing, and design—continued to be based in Alpharetta, Georgia.

In July 2009, Crabtree & Evelyn Ltd. filed for Chapter 11 bankruptcy protection in U.S. District Court in Manhattan. Following the filing, 30 of its 126 American stores closed. Stores in the UK were not affected by the filing.

In 2012, Kuala Lampur Kepong Bhd sold CE Holdings to the Hong Kong-based holding company Khuan Choo International Ltd. for US$155 million.

In October 2016, the brand was acquired by Nan Hai Corporation Ltd., another Hong Kong holding company.
