= Million Year Picnic =

- Type: Private
- Industry: Comics; Collectibles
- Genre: Retail
- Founded: 1974; 52 years ago
- Founder: Jerry Norton Weist
- Headquarters: Cambridge, Massachusetts, United States
- Number of locations: 1
- Area served: U.S., Canada, etc.
- Products: Comics; Toys; T-shirts
- Owner: Tony Davis
- Website: The Million Year Picnic

The Million Year Picnic ("the Picnic"), is a comic book store located in Cambridge, Massachusetts. Established in 1974, the Picnic is the oldest comic book store in New England, and one of the longest standing comic specialty stores in the United States.

== History ==
In 1974, Jerry Norton Weist (1949–2011), an author, bookseller, and comic book and fantasy art collector, formed a partnership with Chuck Wooley to open one of the first comic books specialty stores in North America, called The Million Year Picnic, named for a short story in Ray Bradbury's The Martian Chronicles. Weist was the author of The Original Comic Art Identification and Price Guide (1992), Ray Bradbury: An Illustrated Life (2002), and The 100 Greatest Comic Books (2004). With the permission of EC Comics publisher Bill Gaines, he co-founded (with Bob Barrett and Roger Hill) a noted EC Comics fanzine "Squa Tront," (1967 - 1983). In 1991, Weist curated and organized the first major comic book and comic art auction at Sotheby's. Weist died from multiple myeloma cancer in 2011.

The Picnic's current owner, Tony Davis, began working with Weist in 1983, when Davis was an undergraduate at Harvard University and a part-time store clerk at the Picnic. A comic book veteran, Davis is also a co-founder of the Boston Kids Comics Festival.

In April 1987, the Picnic sold the first book of collected cartoon strips of Bill Watterson's Calvin and Hobbes.

During COVID-19, the Picnic stayed open for business through deliveries and mail order.

In 2024, the Brattle Theatre celebrated the 50th Anniversary of Million Year Picnic with the Boston premiere of a documentary film, "The Picnic: A History and Homage to One of the World's Oldest Comic Book Stores and the People Who Made It What It Is," by Vincent-louis Apruzzese.

== Alumni ==
Located in Harvard Square, the Picnic has employed several Harvard alumni, undergraduate and graduate students, Bostonians, and others, who have achieved success in the comic book industry.

- Vincent-louis Apruzzese
- E.B. Boatner
- Ian Coleman
- Kelly Cooper
- Tom Devlin
- Stacie Dolin
- Craig Gardner
- Carol Kalish
- Pete Kreitchet
- Mike Luce
- Mike P.
- Sally Pasion
- Steve Smith
- Rich Titus
- Jen Welsing
