= Frederick E. Smith =

British author (1919–2012)

- Spouse: Shelagh
- Writing career
- Pen name: David Farrell
- Genre: War
- Notable works: 633 Squadron; Valley of Conflict

Frederick Escreet Smith (4 April 1919 – 15 May 2012) was a British author, best known for his 1956 novel 633 Squadron about a Second World War RAF Mosquito squadron undertaking a seemingly impossible mission to bomb a well-protected German factory at the head of a Norwegian fjord. The novel was made into a successful film in 1964. He also wrote the original 1951 story that the film Devil Doll (1964) is based on.

== Further 633 novels ==
The author later published a number of further spin-off 633 squadron novels between 1975 and 1996, and one more in 2007. Those books are: Operation Rhine Maiden (1975); Operation Crucible (1977); Operation Valkyrie (1978); Operation Cobra (1993); Operation Titan (1994); Operation Crisis (1995); Operation Thor (1995); Operation Defiant (1996); and Operation Safeguard (2007).

== Other works ==
Other books include: Of Masks and Minds (1954), Laws be Their Enemy (1955), Lydia Trendennis (1957), The Sin and the Sinners (1958), The Grotto of Tiberius (1961), The Devil Behind Me (1962), The Dark Cliffs (1962), The Storm Knight (1966), A Killing for the Hawks (1966), The Wider Sea of Love (1969), Waterloo (a 1970 novelisation, based on the 1970 film), The Persuaders! (3 volumes of novelisations in 1972, based on the television series), See How We Run (1972), The Tormented (1974), Saffron's War (1975), Saffron's Army (1977), Saffron's Trials (1996), The War God (1980), The Obsession (1984), Rage of the Innocents (1986), A Meeting of Stars (1987), In Presence of my Foes (1988), Years of the Fury (1989), and a guide to how to Write a Successful Novel (1991).

As David Farrell, he also wrote The Other Cousin (1962), Temptation Isle (1962), Two Loves (1963), Strange Enemy (1967), Valley of Conflict (1967), Mullion Rock (1968).

== Autobiography ==
Two volumes of autobiography, A Youthful Absurdity and An Author's Absurdities, were published in 2011 and 2012, with a further volume The Final Absurdities scheduled to follow in November 2012. The books chart his early experiences in the RAF and in South Africa, marriage to his wife Shelagh, and his experiences as a full-time author.

== Private life ==
Frederick E. Smith lived for 50 years in the Southbourne area of Bournemouth and worked hard promoting the art of writing, editing a local writers' magazine, and lecturing across the country. He died in Bournemouth of a heart attack on 15 May 2012, aged 93.
