= Ronald Allen =

English actor (1930–1991)

- Born: Ronald John Allen; 16 December 1930; Reading, England
- Died: 18 June 1991 (aged 60); London, England
- Resting place: Reading Cemetery and Crematorium, Reading, England
- Occupation: Actor
- Years active: 1957–1990
- Spouse: Sue Lloyd (m. 1991)

Ronald John Allen (16 December 1930 – 18 June 1991) was an English actor. He is best known for playing David Hunter in the long-running ITV soap opera Crossroads, a role he played from 1969 to 1985.

== Early life ==
Allen was born in Reading, Berkshire. He studied at Leighton Park School in Reading and trained at the Royal Academy of Dramatic Art (RADA) in London, where he won the John Gielgud Scholarship.

== Career ==
Allen worked in repertory theatre and had a season at the Old Vic in London. He also appeared in several films, including A Night to Remember (1958) about the sinking of the Titanic, the espionage film Circle of Deception (1960), the British horror films The Projected Man (1966) and The Fiend (1972), the war film Hell Boats (1970), and the black comedy Eat the Rich (1987).

After roles in the BBC soaps Compact (1963–64) and United! (1966–67) came his best-remembered role, in the long-running soap Crossroads (1969–85). Allen played David Hunter, who was a shareholder of the Crossroads Motel with Meg Mortimer, Tish Hope and Bernard Booth. He also twice appeared as a guest star in the science fiction programme Doctor Who, in the stories The Dominators (1968) and The Ambassadors of Death (1970).

Allen frequently appeared as a guest in The Comic Strip Presents. In the first episode, Five Go Mad in Dorset (1982), which spoofed Enid Blyton's The Famous Five stories, he makes a surprise appearance as Uncle Quentin; deliberately sending up his staid image, he most memorably told The Famous Five, "Your Aunt Fanny is an unrelenting nymphomaniac – and I am a screaming homosexual". Allen reprised the role in the sequel Five Go Mad on Mescalin (1983), and also appeared in South Atlantic Raiders Part 2 (1990), The Strike (1988) and Oxford (1990), in addition to the feature film The Supergrass (1985). There was much comic mileage to be gained from Allen sending up his conservative image. In a 1987 interview, he said that he was approached by a very intimidating-looking punk who shook his hand and said, "I thought you were really cool in The Supergrass". Then, as he was about to walk away, he turned back and said, almost apologetically, "I loved you in Crossroads too!"

Allen's other screen appearances included roles in television's The Adventures of Robin Hood (1957), Danger Man (1960, 1961), The Avengers (1964), and Bergerac (1990).

Allen's performance as David Hunter was also the inspiration for "Mr Clifford" in Victoria Wood's spoof soap Acorn Antiques in her 1980s comedy sketch series Victoria Wood: As Seen on TV. Duncan Preston played the role, mimicking Allen's appearance, mannerisms and particularly his "absurdly plummy" manner of speech.

In the 2023 ITVX miniseries Nolly, which dramatised the life of his former Crossroads colleague Noele Gordon, Allen was portrayed by Richard Lintern.

== Personal life ==
Allen was close friends with his co-star and on-screen wife, Sue Lloyd. The two became a couple and made their relationship public when the British media started to intrude into their private lives. In March 1991, when Allen learned that he had terminal cancer, he and Lloyd got engaged and married in May 1991. He died six weeks later, on 18 June 1991, at the age of 60. Lloyd died of cancer in 2011.

== Filmography ==
=== Film ===
Year	Title	Role	Notes
1958	A Night to Remember	Mr. Clarke	
1960	Circle of Deception	Abelson	
1963	Cleopatra	Minor role	Uncredited
1966	The Projected Man	Dr. Chris Mitchel	
1970	Hell Boats	Commander Ashurst, R. N.	
1972	The Fiend	Paul	
1985	The Supergrass	Commander Robertson	
1987	Eat the Rich	Commander Fortune	

=== Television ===
Year	Title	Role	Notes
1957	Producers' Showcase	Benvolio	Episode: "Romeo and Juliet"
1957	ITV Play of the Week	Julian	Episode: "The Green Bay Tree"
1957	ITV Play of the Week	Paul	Episode: "Mrs. Willie"
1957	The Adventures of Robin Hood	Walter Neville	Episode: "The Bride of Robin Hood"
1957	Armchair Theatre	Jimmy	Episode: "Dear Murderer"
1957	Armchair Theatre		Episode: "The Women Have Their Way"
1958	Armchair Theatre	Gustave	Episode: "The Lady of Camellias"
1959	Armchair Theatre	Mr. Burch	Episode: "My Guess Would Be Murder"
1959	Playhouse 90	Tommy	Episode: "Dark as the Night"
1960	Schilling Playhouse	Christopher Johns	Episode: "The Big Miracle"
1960	The Four Just Men	Ted	Episode: "The Bystanders"
1960	Danger Man	Walter Bernard	Episode: "Colonel Rodriguez"
1960	Danger Man	Ted Baker	Episode: "The Honeymooners"
1962	Drama 61-67	Tommy Prince	Episode: "Drama '62: The Days and Nights of Beebee"
1962–1965	Compact	Ian Harmon	Series regular
1963	BBC Sunday-Night Play	The Passenger	Episode: "Night Express"
1963	No Hiding Place	Derek Breen	Episode: "Expert with Salt"
1964	The Avengers	Allan Paignton	Episode: "The Secrets Broker"
1966–1967	United!	Mark Wilson	Series regular
1967	No Hiding Place	Captain Jeffrey Sangster	Episode: "A Through and Through with Powder"
1967	The Dick Emery Show		1 episode
1967	Half Hour Story	Hugh Banks	Episode: "Quick on the Takeover"
1968	Doctor Who	Rago	The Dominators – 5 episodes
1969	The Root of All Evil?	Gerald	Episode: "What's in It for Me?"
1970	Doctor Who	Ralph Cornish	The Ambassadors of Death – 7 episodes
1971	The Liver Birds	Derek	Episode: "The New Neighbour"
1972–1985	Crossroads: Kings Oak	David Hunter	Series regular
1982–1983	The Comic Strip Present...	Uncle Quentin	2 episodes
1988	The Comic Strip Present...	Prime Minister	Episode: "The Strike"
1989	Generations	Lloyd Bradfield	Series regular
1990	Bergerac	Giles Grey	Episode: "My Name's Sergeant Bergerac"
1990	The Comic Strip Present...	Captain Phillips	Episode: "South Atlantic Raiders: Part 2 Argie Bargie!"
1990	The Comic Strip Present...	Professor Roland Breeze	Episode: "Oxford"
