= Hell Boats =

1970 film by Paul Wendkos

- Theatrical release poster by Frank McCarthy
- Directed by: Paul Wendkos
- Written by: Derek Ford; Donald Ford; Anthony Spinner
- Produced by: Lewis J. Rachmil
- Starring: James Franciscus, Elizabeth Shepherd, Ronald Allen
- Cinematography: Paul Beeson
- Edited by: John S. Smith
- Music by: Frank Cordell
- Production company: Oakmont Productions
- Distributed by: United Artists
- Release date: 20 March 1970
- Running time: 95 minutes
- Country: United Kingdom
- Language: English

Hell Boats is a 1970 British war film directed by Paul Wendkos that was filmed in Malta. It stars James Franciscus, Elizabeth Shepherd, and Ronald Allen in a story about British Motor Torpedo Boats in the Mediterranean in World War II. It was the last film made by Oakmont Productions, a branch of Mirisch Films. The film's technical advisor was Lieutenant Commander Ian Nagle Douglas Cox, who was awarded the Distinguished Service Order while serving in HMS Malcolm in 1940.

== Plot ==
In 1941 Lieutenant Commander Jeffords, an American serving with the Royal Navy Reserve is assigned to Valletta, Malta, to command a flotilla of Motor Torpedo Boats for a top secret mission. Jeffords is granted permission to take his friend Chief Petty Officer Yacov, a Jewish Palestinian, with him.

Through scrounging spare parts from sunken craft, the battered flotilla is able to piece together three seaworthy craft. Jeffords' mission is to destroy a former Italian submarine base in Augusta, Sicily, that now contains the German's Fritz X glide bombs that have been taking a heavy toll of British shipping. As the bombs are stored in former submarine pens tunnelled inside a mountain, an aerial attack is unfeasible. It is up to Jeffords to determine how he will accomplish his mission.

Off duty, Jeffords meets Alison Ashurst bathing in the nude; she turns out to be the wife of his commanding officer Commander Andrew Ashurst, whose father is the Admiral who sent Jeffords to Malta. Jeffords initially turns down her offer of having an affair but during an air raid they take shelter and kiss. Later, after returning with a captured E-boat, Jeffords finds Alison waiting for him in his bed. It's implied they then sleep together.

Jeffords first decides to make a reconnaissance of his target by being taken into the base by the Sicilian Resistance. Jeffords' mission is successful, but at the cost of the lives of his Resistance escort. The Italian officer who was supposed to guide him had earlier been arrested.

Jeffords schemes to capture a German E-Boat in a manner similar to Commander Ian Fleming's Operation Ruthless. By sending a false radio message that General Alexander's aeroplane has gone missing in a certain area, Jeffords and crew pose as survivors of the crash then capture the boat attempting to pick them up. Jeffords uses the captured craft as a Trojan Horse to penetrate the harbour, having the other boats in the flotilla follow his captured craft in once the Germans have lifted their boom gate. Jeffords and two others don Scuba sets to swim into the tunnels and plant explosive charges. Contrary to Jeffords' instructions, the MTBs (all of which are eventually lost) and the E-boat wait to pick him and his chief up.

After returning to Malta, Alison greets Andrew and Jeffords. Jeffords leaves silently, and it is implied Andrew and Alison will try and make their marriage work.

The Allied invasion of Sicily took place in July 1943.

== Cast ==
- James Franciscus as Lieutenant Commander Jeffords, R.N.V.R.
- Elizabeth Shepherd as Alison Ashurst
- Ronald Allen as Commander Ashurst, R.N.
- Reuven Bar-Yotam as Chief Petty Officer Yacov
- Mark Hawkins as Lieutenant Barlow, R.N.
- Magda Konopka as Luciana
- Drewe Henley as Sub. Lieutenant Johnson, R.N.
- Inigo Jackson as Chief Petty Officer Stanhope
- Takis Emmanuel as Salvatore
- Philip Madoc as 'E' Boat Captain
- John G. Heller as Rheinhardt
- David Savile as Lieutenant Wallace, R.N.
- Seán Barrett as Sub. Lieutenant Hendrickson, R.N.V.R.
- Bernard Davies as Cramer
- Moultrie Kelsall as Vice Admiral Ashurst
- Peter Burton as Admiral's Aide
- Andreas Malandrinos as Beni

== See also ==
- Hanover Street, a 1979 film starring Harrison Ford, whose plot includes a similar love triangle.
