= Brattle Theatre =

Movie theater in Cambridge, Massachusetts, United States

Coordinates: 42°22′25″N 71°7′17″W

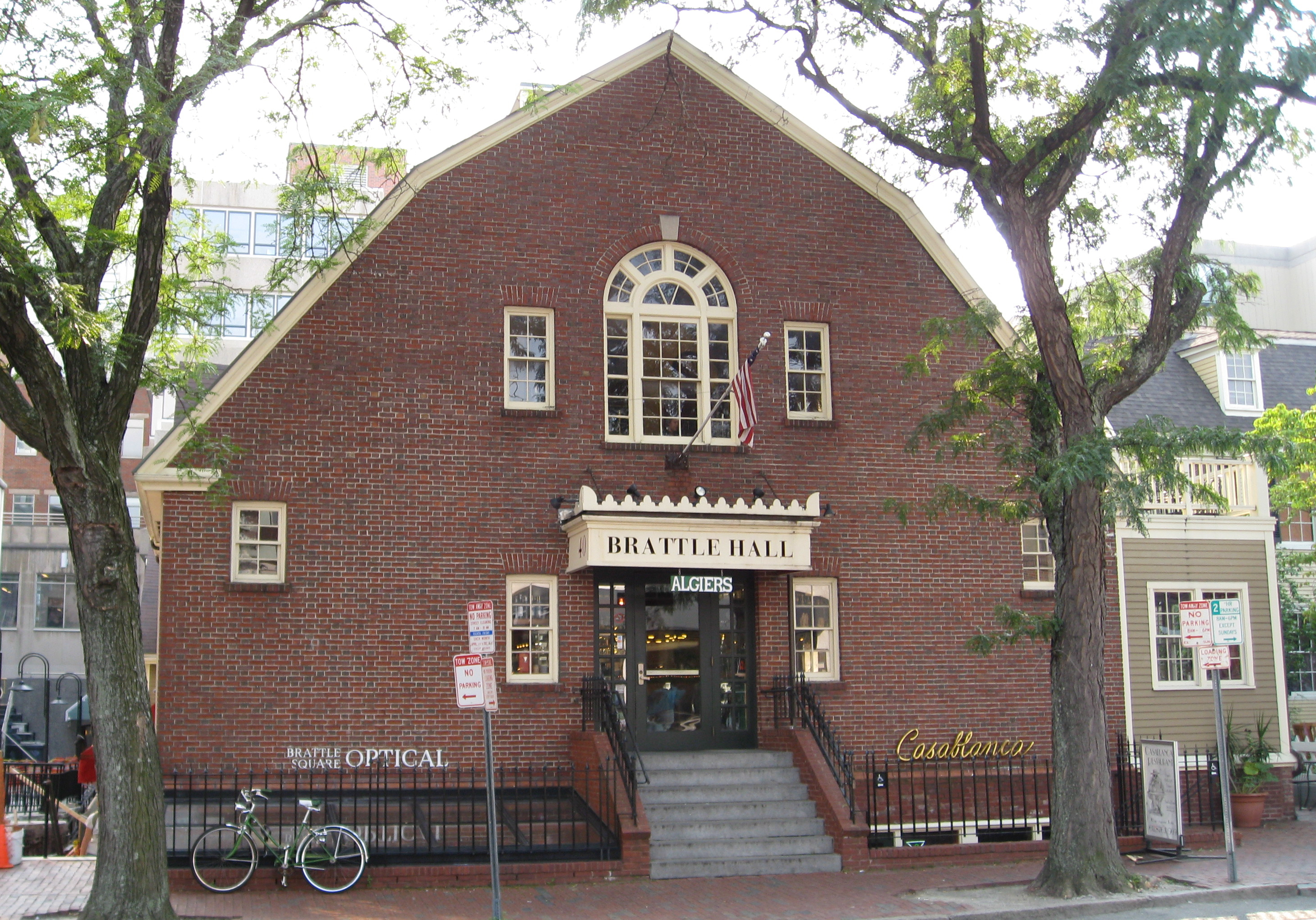
- Brattle Hall. The theatre entrance is at the bottom of the stairs on the left
- Interactive map of Brattle Theatre
- Address: 40 Brattle Street; Cambridge, MA 02138; USA
- Owner: Brattle Film Foundation
- Type: Movie theater

Construction
- Opened: 1953

Website
- www.brattlefilm.org

The Brattle Theatre is a repertory movie theater located in Brattle Hall at 40 Brattle Street near Harvard Square in Cambridge, Massachusetts. The theatre is a small movie house with one screen. It is one of the few remaining movie theaters, if not the only one, to use a rear-projection system; the projector is located behind the screen rather than behind the audience.

The Brattle Theatre mainly screens a mixture of foreign, independent, and classic films, and began showing repertory and foreign films in February 1953. Despite the rapid disappearance of American arthouse theaters, the Brattle has managed to maintain a loyal base of moviegoers while remaining independently operated.

== History ==
The theatre was started by the Cambridge Social Union, cofounded in January 1871 by the Reverend Samuel Longfellow, brother of Henry Wadsworth Longfellow. In 1889, the union purchased the lot on Brattle Street for $9,000, and hired the Cambridge architectural firm headed by Alexander Wadsworth Longfellow Jr. to draft plans for Brattle Hall. The gala opening occurred on January 27, 1890. Local and touring drama groups used the hall, which also housed a ballet school, lectures, and police calisthenics. The theatre sometimes came into conflict with the city, however. In 1928, the city attempted to ban a production of Fiesta, a politically controversial drama performed by the Harvard Dramatic Club, but could not close the show. The 1942 production of Othello starring African-American actor Paul Robeson played the Brattle, bolstering its reputation as a progressive institution.

In 1948, a group of World War II veterans attending Harvard founded the Brattle Theatre Company. The Company presented classic and contemporary serious drama with a group of repertory actors and directors. Among the players whose careers began with the Company were Jerome Kilty, Cavada Humphrey, Albert Marre, and Robert Fletcher. The actor Zero Mostel, who had been blacklisted for his political affiliations, made his national stage debut in a production of Molière's The Imaginary Invalid, and the British actress Hermione Gingold made her American debut.

In the 1950s, Cyrus Harvey Jr., a 1947 graduate of Harvard College, and Bryant Haliday, a 1947 Harvard graduate, established the Brattle as one of the first art house movie theaters. They revived forgotten American classic films and contemporary foreign films. Many of the foreign films have become classic, such as those by Akira Kurosawa, Ingmar Bergman, Federico Fellini, and François Truffaut.

Harvey and Haliday built on the Brattle model to establish Janus Films, which acquired and distributed world cinema and influenced the model used by The Criterion Collection.

== Bogie Cult ==
Starting in the late 1950s, the Brattle started a tradition of screening Humphrey Bogart films during the week of final exams at Harvard University. Films such as Casablanca and The Maltese Falcon were watched again and again and the "Bogie Cult" at the Brattle was formed. It was not uncommon for fans to attend these movies in costume and recite the dialogue word for word. Even to this day, there is always a packed crowd to see a Bogart film, such as the traditional Valentine's Day showing of Casablanca.

== The Brattle today ==
Today, the Brattle is operated as a non-profit and is run by the Brattle Film Foundation. It is currently the only independent cinema operated in the city of Cambridge. The Brattle continues to screen an eclectic mix of foreign, arthouse, and "recent rave" films. Ongoing events include, but are not limited to, the Schlock Around the Clock series, the Bugs Bunny Film Festival, the Art House Auction, the Oscar Party, and the Watch-a-thon. Starting in October 2005, the Brattle announced its largest fundraising mission in its 55-year history. The goal was to raise $500,000 over the next two years to pay down past rent and to solidify its outreach and community programs.

On February 16, 2008, the Brattle Theatre celebrated its 55th anniversary as a movie theater in Harvard Square.

In early 2013, the Brattle Theatre conducted a successful Kickstarter campaign to fund a digital projection system and a HVAC upgrade.

In 2024, the Brattle Theatre celebrated the 50th Anniversary of Million Year Picnic with the Boston premiere of a documentary film about New England's oldest comic book store.

== See also ==
- Somerville Theatre
- Coolidge Corner Theatre
