= Saul J. Turell =

American film producer, film director, screenwriter and film editor (1921–1986)

Saul J. Turell (January 20, 1921 – April 10, 1986) was a producer and maker of documentaries, and a distributor for classic film.

== Early years ==
He founded Sterling Films in 1946. In the early sixties, Sterling Films merged with the Walter Reade Organization, becoming Reade-Sterling, of which Turell was president.

== Career ==
In 1965, Turell and William J. Becker took over the ailing Janus Films. The same year, Turell directed The Love Goddesses, released by Walter Reade and Paramount Pictures with the subtitle "A History of Sex in the Cinema".

He won an Academy Award in 1980 in the category Best Documentary Short Subject for Paul Robeson: Tribute to an Artist.
