= Tower of Evil =

1972 British horror film by Jim O'Connolly

- Theatrical release poster
- Directed by: Jim O'Connolly
- Written by: Jim O'Connolly
- Produced by: Richard Gordon
- Starring: Bryant Haliday; Jill Haworth; Mark Edwards; Anna Palk
- Cinematography: Desmond Dickinson
- Edited by: Henry Richardson
- Music by: Kenneth V. Jones
- Production companies: Grenadier Films; The Fanfare Company
- Distributed by: Anglo-EMI Film Distributors (United Kingdom); The Fanfare Company (United States)
- Release date: 19 May 1972 (New York City)
- Running time: 89 minutes
- Countries: United Kingdom; United States
- Language: English
- Budget: $400,000 est.

Tower of Evil (also known by the titles Horror on Snape Island and Beyond the Fog) is a 1972 slasher film directed and written by Jim O'Connolly and starring Bryant Haliday and Jill Haworth. It follows a group of archeologists searching for a mystic Phoenician treasure on a deserted island, where they are met with a series of mysterious murders.

A co-production between the United Kingdom and United States, Tower of Evil was filmed at Shepperton Studios.

== Plot ==
One night, a boat reaches Snape Island. Two seamen go on shore and find a male corpse with a severed hand. They enter a lighthouse to investigate and find a female body with a severed head. They split up and find another murdered person. Then they find a young woman, Penny, hiding in a closet. Traumatized, she fatally stabs the older seaman. The other man—the boat's captain—survives.

Penny is later examined by doctors. Shocked, she eventually starts talking and remembering how her friends arrived. The flashbacks make her scream.

After hearing about this, scientists decide to visit Snape Island, which is loaded with gold and Phoenician treasures. The team, consisting of five men and two women, sets out on the Sea Ghost, a boat captained by the surviving seaman.

After landing, they notice a lack of sea gulls and other forms of life. They suspect that the island has another inhabitant. Their leader, Dr. Simpson, looks at a stashed away sack. The captain sees a picture of his brother in the mansion. He reveals that his brother, sister-in-law and their child died on the Island.

The scientists eventually hear an unusual noise and split up to look for the cause. After everyone reunites, Dr. Simpson says that he will check on the boat. Before leaving, he says that the three young people must have been murdered by a madman who may still be on the island. While two scientists have sex, the rest of the men go out to look for the Doctor and find that someone blew up the boat. One of the scientists having sex runs to the boat. The other one, Nora, wanders alone and is stalked by the murderer, a bearded madman. She sees a decomposing body in a rocker, screams and passes out.

The others come running and find Nora and the body. They demand answers from the captain. He reveals that the corpse is his sister-in-law and that his brother Saul is still there, living in the caves under the house. The madman also destroyed their radio. The men decide to go in pairs to find Saul. The women, consisting of Nora and her friend Rose, stay inside. The captain and his search partner find Saul's cave.

Rose hears someone weeping, investigates and eventually sees Saul rocking the corpse of his dead wife. He hears Rose and, while stalking her, finds Nora, who runs to the top of the lighthouse. There Saul throws her off onto rocks. Seeing that Nora is dead, Rose and the two other men go into a cave together. Meanwhile, the Doctor, who is near a coffin, finds the treasure. He hears the unusual sound again and pursues it. After he leaves, the captain's search partner finds the treasure. After looking it over, he hears Saul laugh. Saul then crashes in on him. The remaining five meet up in the cave. The Doctor explains that he fired his gun at Saul and was stalking him all night.

The unusual sounds returns. Rose and scientist Dan stay with the treasure while the captain, the Doctor and the other man go looking for Saul. Saul eventually attacks Rose. Dan comes to help, but Saul breaks his neck. With all of the screaming, the three men reappear and shoot Saul dead. The Doctor reveals that he has been to the island before. On the other side of it, he left a boat and supplies. The captain stays with Rose and the two other men go to get the boat and some of the artifacts. Then Rose and the captain go inside the lighthouse. The captain says that Martha never wanted his brother Saul to be reported. The captain then goes upstairs to get some sleep but later returns bleeding. He mentions Michael, Saul's son, and dies. Then, the deformed Michael attacks Rose. She throws an oil lamp at Michael and sets him on fire. As he burns to death, the house and cave catch on fire as Saul had it rigged to. Rose escapes and the two surviving men leave the cave to watch the house and its dwellers burn.

== Cast ==
- Bryant Haliday as Evan Brent
- Jill Haworth as Rose Mason
- Anna Palk as Nora Winthrop
- William Lucas as Superintendent Hawk
- Anthony Valentine as Dr. Simpson
- Jack Watson as Hamp Gurney
- Mark Edwards as Adam
- Derek Fowlds as Dan Winthrop
- John Hamill as Gary
- Gary Hamilton as Brom
- Candace Glendenning as Penny Read
- Seretta Wilson as Mae
- Dennis Price as Laurence Bakewell
- George Coulouris as John Gurney
- Robin Askwith as Des
- Frederic Abbott as Saul Gurney
- Mark McBride as Michael Gurney
- Marianne Stone as nurse

== Production ==
=== Development ===
Producer Richard Gordon was looking for a horror film he could make in England in association with Joe Solomon of Fanfare Films. Gordon met George Baxt who pitched him the story of Tower of Evil and Gordon bought it. Gordon paid Baxt $5,000 to write a script which was delivered six months later. Neither Gordon nor Solomon liked the final script, feeling that there was too much humor.

Gordon decided to proceed on the basis of the strength of the story, looking for a new director. He approached Sidney Hayers who was a friend of Baxt, but Gordon turned him down because he felt Hayers was too enthusiastic about Baxt's script and wanted to shoot it as written. Gordon was then introduced by Herman Cohen to Jim O'Connolly (the two men had made Berserk! together), who said he would only make it if the script was rewritten; Gordon agreed, and O'Connolly rewrote the script to a degree which pleased Gordon and Solomon. Gordon says this permanently ruined his relationship with Baxt.

The film was an international co-production between the British company Grenadier Films, and the United States-based Fanfare Company.

=== Casting ===
Gordon says the British unions protested the importation of American actor Bryant Haliday to play a role. Gordon arranged for Lee Patterson as a back up but secured Halliday's casting by claiming that the film's financing was dependent on Haliday being in the cast.

Gordon says Mark Edwards was recommended to him by James Carreras off the back of Blood from the Mummy's Tomb.

=== Filming ===
Apart from a few location shots, the movie was entirely filmed at Shepperton Studios in Shepperton, Surrey in 1971.

== Release ==
The film opened in New York City under the title Horror on Snape Island on 19 May 1972. It opened as Tower of Evil in Newport News, Virginia on 30 August 1972.

=== Home media ===
Elite Entertainment released Tower of Evil on DVD in the United States on 2 November 1999. Scorpion Releasing issued a remastered DVD on 23 July 2013, with a Blu-ray edition following on 6 August 2013. Scorpion Releasing, in association with Kino Lorber, reissued the film on Blu-ray on 26 March 2021.

== Reception ==
=== Box office ===
Gordon says the film did "very well" in England.

A re-issue of the movie reached No. 10 at the US box office, in 1981.

=== Critical response ===
The Monthly Film Bulletin wrote: "Apart from the novelty of its double climax, this is predictable, youth-oriented horror of the "I thought I heard something" school, with a group of unusually attractive, pot-smoking, sex-starved archaeologists stranded on the archetypal accursed isle. As much energy is expended on the self-conscious nudity and violence as on the suspense, but dialogue and performances are anyway equally unconvincing."

The film was dismissed as mere exploitation fodder by many critics. Film critic Leonard Maltin gave the film a "BOMB" rating and said "One of the Horrors of Snape Island is the film itself".

However, over the years, the film has been embraced as something of an underground classic by the horror community. The Terror Trap horror review rated the film positively, calling it "A surprisingly adroit little British slasher, Tower of Evil is a revelatory sleeper.". Elite Entertainment released Tower of Evil on DVD for the first time in 1999. On 12 December 2008, Turner Classic Movies showed the film as part of their late night TCM Underground series.
