= Cyrus Harvey Jr. =

American film distributor

- Born: Cyrus Isadore Harvey Jr. October 14, 1925; Cambridge, Massachusetts, United States
- Died: April 14, 2011 (aged 85); Dayville, Connecticut, United States
- Occupation(s): Film distributor Business entrepreneur
- Known for: Janus Films
- Spouse: Rebecca Miller (1967–?) (3 daughters)

Cyrus Isadore Harvey Jr. (October 14, 1925 – April 14, 2011) was an American film distributor and business entrepreneur, he was the co-founder of Janus Films in 1956, and part-owner of the Brattle Theatre with his longtime business partner film producer and actor Bryant Haliday. Born in Cambridge, Massachusetts, he was the son of Jewish immigrants. He helped introduce American viewers to foreign art movies from many countries including Japan, Italy, France, Spain and Sweden.

== Biography ==
At the end of World War II, Harvey served as a navigator in the United States Air Forces, though he did not serve overseas. After the war he graduated from Harvard University, where he studied history and literature. After graduation, he went to Paris.

In addition to his business interests being a film distributor, he founded the now international retailer Crabtree and Evelyn, that specialises in body and home products.

Cyrus Harvey Jr. died in Dayville, Connecticut, on April 14, 2011, of a stroke suffered four days earlier. He is survived by his second wife, a sister, three daughters, and five grandchildren.

== See also ==
- Janus Films
- Brattle Theatre
- Bryant Haliday
