= Elite Entertainment =

American home media distribution company

- Industry: Home video
- Founded: 1993; 33 years ago
- Defunct: 2003
- Headquarters: Rockaway, New Jersey, U.S.
- Products: DVD, LaserDisc
- Owner: Vincent Bancalari; Don May, Jr.

Elite Entertainment was an American home media distribution company, founded by Vincent Bancalari and Don May, Jr. in 1993. The company specialized in LaserDisc and later, DVD releases of horror, science fiction, and cult films, many of which were public domain titles. Their first release was George A. Romero's Night of the Living Dead (1968), which they distributed on LaserDisc in 1994.

== History ==
Elite Entertainment formed between Vincent Bancalari and Don May, Jr. in April 1993. Both were working in the video distribution industry, and in conversation lamented the poor transfer of a recent home video release of Night of the Living Dead (1968). In January 1994, they managed to secure a distribution rights deal with the filmmakers, and subsequently crafted a series of special features for the release, including audio commentaries recorded in the ensuing months. Elite Entertainment released Night of the Living Dead on LaserDisc in November 1994 in a 2-disc set.

The company continued to release a series of cult horror films on LaserDisc throughout the 1990s, including The Evil Dead, Evil Dead 2, A Nightmare on Elm Street, A Nightmare on Elm Street 2: Freddy's Revenge, God Told Me To, Invaders from Mars, Maniac, and I Spit on Your Grave, among others. Several unrealized releases included Eaten Alive (originally due for a September 1998 LaserDisc release), as well as a LaserDisc double feature of The Boogeyman and The Devonsville Terror, originally due for a December 1998 release; the latter two films were subsequently released as a double-feature DVD by Anchor Bay Entertainment.

In the late-1990s, the company transitioned to releasing titles on DVD, including re-releases of several titles they previously released on LaserDisc, including I Spit on Your Grave in 2002. In 2000, the company released The House on Sorority Row for the first time on DVD. By 2000, the company had a total of 15 DVD releases in their catalogue, approximately one-third of which were public domain titles.

== Select releases ==
- Note: Films listed in order of first release by Elite Entertainment.

Title	Format(s)	Released	Letterboxed	No. discs	Notes	Ref.
Night of the Living Dead	LaserDisc	October 26, 1994	No	3	25th anniversary collector's edition	
Night of the Living Dead	LaserDisc	November 23, 1996	No	1	Standard edition	
Night of the Living Dead	DVD	July 10, 1997	No	1	Collector's edition	
Night of the Living Dead	DVD	March 12, 2002	No	1	Millennium Edition	
Horror Hotel	LaserDisc	December 28, 1994	Yes	1		
Maniac	LaserDisc	March 28, 1995	Yes	1	Director's cut	
Maniac	DVD	December 9, 1998	Yes	1	Director's cut	
A Nightmare on Elm Street	LaserDisc	March 4, 1996	Yes	2	Collector's edition	
A Nightmare on Elm Street	LaserDisc	March 4, 1996	Yes	1	Standard edition	
A Nightmare on Elm Street 2: Freddy's Revenge	LaserDisc	June 18, 1996	Yes	1		
Lisa and the Devil	LaserDisc	August 1996	Yes	2	Double feature	
Baron Blood	LaserDisc	August 1996	Yes	2	Double feature	
The Texas Chainsaw Massacre 2	LaserDisc	September 11, 1996	Yes	1		
A Nightmare on Elm Street 3: Dream Warriors	LaserDisc	September 25, 1996	Yes	1		
Dawn of the Dead	LaserDisc	October 1996	Yes	2	Director's cut	
Dawn of the Dead	LaserDisc	December 1996	Yes	3	Collector's edition / director's cut	
The Texas Chain Saw Massacre	LaserDisc	December 4, 1996	Yes	2	Collector's edition	
The Stepford Wives	LaserDisc	April 30, 1997	Yes	1		
Lady in White	LaserDisc	July 18, 1997	Yes	2	Director's cut	
Lady in White	DVD	March 24, 1998	Yes	1	Director's cut	
Prom Night	LaserDisc	October 1, 1997	Yes	1		
Evil Dead 2	LaserDisc	October 28, 1997	Yes	1	Special edition	
I Spit on Your Grave	LaserDisc	August 1998	Yes	1		
I Spit on Your Grave	DVD	December 8, 1998	Yes	1		
The Evil Dead	LaserDisc	November 3, 1998	No	1		
The Evil Dead	DVD	March 30, 1999	No	1	Collector's edition	
The Evil Dead	LaserDisc	April 6, 1999	No	2	Collector's edition	
Tower of Evil	DVD	November 2, 1999	Yes	1		
The House on Sorority Row	DVD	November 21, 2000	Yes	1		
Popcorn	DVD	September 4, 2001	Yes	1		
The Incubus	DVD	August 27, 2002	Yes	1		
A Night to Dismember	DVD	October 29, 2002	Yes	1		
Horror	DVD	May 27, 2003	Yes	1		

== Sources ==
- May, Don (1997). "Night of the Living Disc". Video Watchdog. No. 38. Cincinnati, Ohio: Tim & Donna Lucas. p. 24. ISSN 1070-9991.
