= Bryant Haliday =

American actor and producer (1928–1996)

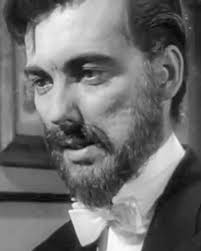
- Haliday in Devil Doll, 1964.
- Born: April 7, 1928; Albany, New York, U.S.
- Died: July 28, 1996 (aged 68); Paris, France
- Known for: Actor and stage and film producer, co-founder of Janus Films

Bryant Haliday (April 7, 1928 – July 28, 1996) was an American actor, as well as producer, of film and stage, who was instrumental in providing a showcase for international film titles in the United States by co-founding Janus Films with his business partner Cyrus Harvey, Jr.

== Early life and theatre ==
He entered Harvard to study law. Haliday was an actor and founding member of the Brattle Theatre Company (BTC) based at the Brattle Theatre in Cambridge, Massachusetts; the BTC was an American version of England's The Old Vic. Haliday produced and acted in many of the productions there. In 1948, he purchased the theatre. The BTC dissolved in 1952, and the theater became a movie house. In 1966, Haliday sold the theater to Bramont Trust. Cyrus Harvey, Jr. continued to manage it into the 1970s.

== Janus Films ==
Janus Films was founded in 1956 by Haliday and Harvey. Haliday ran the 55th Street Playhouse in New York and used it as a primary location for exhibiting Janus-distributed films, which included the films of Ingmar Bergman, Federico Fellini, Akira Kurosawa and Michelangelo Antonioni.

== Horror films ==
By the 1960s, Halliday was wealthy enough to look on acting as a hobby, and was able to satisfy his interest in horror films by traveling to England to appear in Lindsay Shonteff's Devil Doll (1964) and Curse of Simba (1964). He would later return to England to appear in The Projected Man (1966) and Tower of Evil (1971). All were produced by his friend and fellow New Yorker Richard Gordon.

== Personal life ==
According to Cyrus Harvey Jr.'s wife Rebecca, Haliday was "gay and Catholic".

== Later life and death ==
By the mid–1970s, Haliday was semi-retired and living in France, where he spent the last few years of his life producing and appearing in French television and theatre roles. He died in Paris in 1996.

== Filmography ==
Year	Title	Role	Notes
1951	La course de taureaux	Narrator	(American version)
1962	Jusqu'à plus soif	Ken Harvey	
1963	Règlements de compte	Bryant	
1963	Krigets vanvett	Narrator	(English language version)
1964	Devil Doll	The Great Vorelli	
1965	Curse of Simba	Mike Stacey	
1966	The Projected Man	Dr. Paul Steiner	
1972	Tower of Evil	Brent	(final film role)
