= Devil Doll (film) =

1964 British film by Lindsay Shonteff

- Theatrical release poster.
- Directed by: Lindsay Shonteff
- Screenplay by: George Barclay; Lance Z. Hargreaves
- Story by: Frederick Escreet Smith
- Produced by: Lindsay Shonteff
- Starring: Bryant Haliday; William Sylvester; Yvonne Romain
- Cinematography: Gerald Gibbs
- Edited by: Ernest Bullingham
- Production companies: Galaworldfilm Productions; Gordon Films
- Distributed by: Associated Film Distributing Corp.
- Release date: September 1964
- Running time: 81 minutes
- Country: United Kingdom
- Language: English
- Budget: est. $60–75,000

Devil Doll is a 1964 British horror film directed and produced by Lindsay Shonteff and starring Bryant Haliday, William Sylvester and Yvonne Romain. The screenplay was by George Barclay and Lance Z. Hargreaves from a story by Frederick Escreet Smith. The story is about an evil stage hypnotist and his dummy Hugo.

== Plot summary ==
Stage hypnotist/magician "The Great Vorelli" and his dummy Hugo perform before a packed audience in London. The audience observes tension between the magician and Hugo, which Vorelli keeps in a locked cage between performances. American reporter Mark English is assigned a story on Vorelli, and solicits his girlfriend Marianne Horn, a wealthy heiress, to go with him to another show.

At the show, Vorelli asks for a volunteer. Mark encourages Marianne to go up. Vorelli hypnotizes her and makes her dance the twist. During Vorelli's ventriloquism act, Hugo gets up from his chair and walks around, seemingly under his own power. Mark, wanting a closer look at Hugo to determine how this trick is performed, gets Marianne to invite Vorelli to her aunt's charity ball.

While Vorelli performs his ventriloquism at the ball, Hugo takes a knife from the buffet table and tries to stab Vorelli, only stopping when Vorelli focuses all his will. The guests assume this is part of Vorelli's act. Mark secretly examines Hugo, and finds he is a simple dummy, without clockwork mechanisms, a space for an operator, or any other feature that might allow him to walk on his own. The night of the ball, Vorelli stays at the mansion of Marianne's aunt, where he rapes Marianne after using his power to subdue her will. Hugo appears in Mark's room and pleads "Help me ... 1948 ... Berlin" before disappearing.

Marianne falls into a semi-coma that the doctors cannot alleviate. In one lucid moment, she tells Mark that "He keeps calling me" and "Make him stop". Mark realizes her state is the result of being hypnotized by Vorelli, and begins an investigation into Vorelli's past. Through a colleague, Mark discovers that Vorelli was a medical doctor who dabbled in Eastern magic and was disbarred. The colleague guides Mark to a former assistant of Vorelli's who lives in Berlin, named Mercedes. She tells Mark that another assistant, Hugo, worked for Vorelli in 1947, and was hypnotized into a state where he could not feel pain as part of their act. Mercedes would catch the two in strange conferences. One night, Vorelli stabbed Hugo on stage, and this time Hugo reacted with pain. Hugo was comatose for three months, during which Vorelli transferred Hugo's soul into the dummy, resulting in his death. The death was ruled an accident, and no one believed Mercedes's story, despite a theatre worker testifying he saw the dummy move immediately after Hugo screamed in pain.

Mark suspects Vorelli deliberately hypnotized Hugo to die from the knife wound, but his concerns over Vorelli are greatly assuaged when he hears that Marianne has awoken from her comatose state.

Vorelli's current assistant and lover, Magda, is outraged at his rape of Marianne and threatens to go to the police. Vorelli taunts Hugo into murdering Magda with a knife when Vorelli is visiting with stage crew elsewhere. Vorelli then hires a new, younger assistant named Grace whom he also puts under his hypnotic control.

Vorelli visits Marianne in her home and hypnotizes her into agreeing to marry him. Vorelli confides to Hugo that he plans to marry Marianne in Spain and transfer her spirit into another doll before letting her body die and inheriting her wealth. He opens Hugo's cage, intending to discipline him due to his recent rebellions. Instead, Hugo smashes the face of the doll intended for Marianne, and attacks Vorelli. The two struggle, their two souls interacting, until Vorelli finally locks Hugo back in his cage. Mark enters the room. Vorelli speaks in Hugo's voice and tells Mark that Hugo has now transferred his soul into Vorelli's body and vice versa and that Marianne's hypnotized state is broken. From Hugo's former puppet body, Vorelli begs for help from Mark.

== Cast ==
- Bryant Haliday as The Great Vorelli
- William Sylvester as Mark English
- Yvonne Romain as Marianne Horn
- Sandra Dorne as Magda Cardenas
- Nora Nicholson as Aunt Eva
- Alan Gifford as Bob Garrett
- Karel Stepanek as Dr Heller
- Francis de Wolff as Dr Keisling
- Philip Ray as Uncle Walter (uncredited)
- Guy Deghy as Hans (uncredited)
- Lorenza Coalville as Mercedes (uncredited)
- David Charlesworth as Hugo (uncredited)
- Ella Tracey as Louisa (uncredited)
- Heidi Erich as Grace (uncredited)
- Jackie Ramsden as nurse (uncredited)
- Margaret Durnell as the Countess (uncredited)
- Pamela Law as Garrett's girlfriend (uncredited)
- Anthony Baird as Mr Harrison (uncredited)
- Ray Landor as twist dancer (uncredited)
- Trixie Dallas as Miss Penton

== Production ==
In 1955, Frederick E. Smith wrote for London Mystery Magazine the story on which the film would be based. He earned £10 for doing so, and said that one of the conditions of cashing his cheque was that he surrender any rights of resale of the story.

The film's script was originally written in 1957. In 1959, film producer Richard Gordon announced in an interview had that he obtained the film rights to the story. Funding was from Gordon Films, Galaworld and the NFFC.

Sidney J. Furie was originally scheduled to direct, but was offered a more prestigious film, so he recommended his fellow Canadian Lindsay Shonteff. Gordon later said Furie advised Shonteff throughout the making of the film. Shonteff had to re-edit it after completion, to avoid an X rating from the British Board of Film Censors.

Gordon said the cost of the film was £20,000, plus $20,000 for expenses and the salaries of American personnel, including Gordon and Halliday, for an estimated total of $60,000–$75,000.

The movie was distributed in the United States by Joe Solomon.

== Critical reception ==
The Monthly Film Bulletin wrote: "Shot almost entirely in close-up, and with the action highlights reduced to a messy jumble of shock-cuts, this is a very pedestrian affair in which the script seems rather surprised at itself and Bryant Halliday plays the leading role on a single note of staring-eyed monotony. The other performances are adequate, however, and the animated doll theme retains just enough of its built-in compulsion to keep things going."

Kine Weekly wrote: "This is another case where a strong but fantastic plot has been allowed to dawdle into mediocrity. The idea of a human personality being transferred into a wooden dummy is an odd-shaped pill to swallow in any circumstances and the director here never goes fast enough to sever the bonds of disbelief, the result is that the macabre goings-on never generate quite the tension they should. William Sylvester does a workmanlike job as Mark and Bryant Halliday wears a beard and a burning glance to melodramatic effect, whilst Yvonne Romaine supplies the feminine interest."

Variety wrote: "This slow-paced pic never comes up to its title in the way of shocks, thrills, scares, sex or other dividends for meller regulars. Filmed in England, its gimmick – a ventriloquial dummy’s revenge on his manipulator – has been done before and better by Cavalcanti and Michael Redgrave in a real horror classic – Dead of Night – and The Great Gabbo of 1929. ... Sylvester gives an honest, realistic touch to the role of the newspaperman. Halliday, however, burdened with a messy beard and one expression, the hypnotic stare, depends on his resonant voice to make the role credible."

Film critic Leonard Maltin gave the film three stars in his review, summarizing it as an "[o]bscure, underrated mystery that features an eerily effective Haliday as a hypnotist-ventriloquist trying to transfer Romain's soul into that of a dummy, as he had already done with his onetime assistant. An exquisitely tailored, sharply edited sleeper."

Morgan Zabroff for Famous Monsters of Filmland declared the film "[o]ne of the most brilliant films to come from England in 1964," as well as one of the most underrated films of its genre.

Reviewing the film for Cinefantastique, Steve Biodrowski wrote: "Although deliberately created to replicate the eerie quality of the ventriloquist’s dummy episode from Dead of Night (1945), this black-and-white English production works tolerably well as a crude rip-off, thanks to a creepy dummy and an even creepier performance from Haliday as The Great Vorelli. The innovation here is that Vorelli is not only a ventriloquist but also a hypnotist who casts a spell over Marianne. Unfortunately, this Svengali-esque subplot sends the narrative down a detour that ultimately leads nowhere, since the real story is about the mystery of Hugo. Fortunately, the story eventually gets back on track for a reasonably exciting climax, which is nonetheless marred by completely side-lining nominal protagonist Mark, who doesn’t really do anything to resolve the story."

== Home media ==
The film was released on VHS by Gorgon Video in 1985.

Both versions, for the UK and Canada, and the original one, shown in Europe, have been released on DVD; the Special Edition DVD contains both. The European version includes some bare breasts and a strip tease (done under hypnosis). It also bills Sylvester above Haliday, while the British version displays Haliday's name first, and in a considerably larger font than that used for his co-stars' names.

== Legacy ==
The film was also shown on the 27 February 2021 and 29 November 2025 episodes of Svengoolie.

=== Mystery Science Theater 3000 ===
Devil Doll was featured in episode #818 of Mystery Science Theater 3000, which premiered on the Sci-Fi Channel on October 4, 1997. Series writer Paul Chaplin says the movie has a "real darkness", as in "You can't see a thing." He also mocks the character of Mark English, "another fine example of our heroes who get themselves into a scrape and then stumble out of it completely by accident."

In his ranking of MST3K's first twelve national seasons' episodes, Paste writer Jim Vorel placed the episode close the middle, putting it at #107 (Note: Ranking based on 197 nationally-aired episodes as of 2018.). Vorel writes Devil Doll is a "dark, grimy, truly meanspirited film" that "takes a Twilight Zone-esque premise about a ventriloquist and his possibly living doll and fills it with crankiness." The movie's ugliness brings the episode down, despite very strong contributions from Mike and the 'bots. Other critics have a higher opinion of the episode; writer Courtney Enlow, in an article for Vulture, listed Devil Doll as one of the series 25 essential episodes. Gavin Johnson, writing for Den of Geek, listed the movie as one of top 10 horror episodes of the series, claiming Devil Doll is "one of those old movies that could have been decent with another draft and – radical thought – any form of charisma."

The MST3K version of the film was included as part of the Mystery Science Theater 3000, Volume XIX DVD collection, released by Shout! Factory on November 9, 2010. Special features with the film include an interview with the movie's producer, "The Puppet Master: Richard Gordon on Devil Doll," and the movie's theatrical trailer. The other episodes in the four-disc set include Robot Monster (#107), Bride of the Monster (#423), and Devil Fish (#911).

== See also ==
- Killer toys
