= Janus Films =

American film distributor

- Type: Private
- Industry: Motion picture distribution
- Founded: 1956; 70 years ago Cambridge, Massachusetts
- Founder: Bryant Haliday; Cyrus Harvey Jr.
- Headquarters: New York City, U.S.
- Key people: Saul J. Turell; William J. Becker
- Revenue: US$6.1 million (2007)
- Owner: Steven Rales
- Website: www.janusfilms.com

Janus Films is an American film distribution company. The distributor is credited with introducing numerous internationally-produced arthouse films, now considered masterpieces of world cinema, to American audiences, including the films of Michelangelo Antonioni, Sergei Eisenstein, Ingmar Bergman, Federico Fellini, Akira Kurosawa, Satyajit Ray, François Truffaut, Kenji Mizoguchi, Yasujirō Ozu, Robert Bresson, Andrei Tarkovsky, and many other well-regarded directors. Ingmar Bergman's The Seventh Seal was the film responsible for the company's initial growth.

Janus has a close business relationship with The Criterion Collection regarding the release of its films on DVD and Blu-ray and is still an active theatrical distributor.

The company's name and logo, which depicts an Aes grave, reference Janus, the two-faced Roman god of transitions, passages, beginnings, and endings.

== History ==
Janus Films was founded in 1956 by Bryant Haliday and Cyrus Harvey, Jr., in the historic Brattle Theater, a Harvard Square landmark in Cambridge, Massachusetts. Prior to the conception of Janus, Haliday and Harvey began screening both foreign and American films at the Brattle Theater and proceeded to regularly fill the 300-seat venue. Having purchased the theater, Haliday, together with Harvey, converted the Brattle into a popular movie house for the showing of art films.

Perceiving potential success in the film business, Haliday and Harvey moved into the New York City market and began running the 55th Street Playhouse. Janus Films was subsequently launched in March 1956 and the Playhouse was used as the primary location for exhibiting Janus-distributed films. The two owners eventually sold Janus Films in 1965 following a decline in the American art film market, and in 1966 Haliday also sold the Brattle, while Harvey continued to manage the theater into the 1970s.

In 1977, Kino International (now Kino Lorber) acquired rights to the company's film collection, which became the foundation for Kino's international library of films.

Janus was later acquired by Saul J. Turell and William J. Becker. Janus Films, alongside The Criterion Collection, was sold to Steven Rales in May 2024 in a private acquisition.

== Releases ==
On October 24, 2006, in celebration of 50 years of business, the Criterion Collection released 50 of the films that Janus distributed in a large boxset containing 50 DVDs and a 200-page essay on the history of art house films. The package was called Essential Art House: 50 Years of Janus Films. A.O. Scott chose the set as his DVD pick when he co-hosted At the Movies with Ebert & Roeper. As part of its 44th Festival in 2006, the New York Film Festival presented a series called 50 Years of Janus Films, a tribute to the company.

In 2009, Janus Films released Revanche, its first first-run theatrical release in 30 years. Since then, with their distribution partner, Sideshow, Janus Films had released more recent films such as Drive My Car and EO.

Then, in 2010, Janus acquired domestic theatrical and home video rights to the Charlie Chaplin library under license from the Chaplin estate and worldwide distribution agent MK2. The Criterion division handles the Chaplin library for re-issue on DVD and Blu-ray, in addition to theatrical release.

In 2024, Janus and Sideshow distributed the Latvian animated film, Flow, by director Gints Zilbalodis. Having no dialogue and only using animal noises and environmental sounds, the film follows a cat and other animals in a flooded, post-apocalyptic world. Flow has become the all-time highest-grossing release for Janus and earned multiple awards including the Academy Award for Best Animated Feature.

Janus also currently manages part of the Caidin Film Company library for Westchester Films, and the Faces Distribution/John Cassavetes library for Jumer Productions, both companies' successors-in-interest to Castle Hill Productions.

=== Sideshow releases ===
Release date	Title	Notes
December 3, 2021	Drive My Car	Cannes Film Festival Award for Best Screenplay; Academy Award for Best International Film; Nominated—Palme d'Or; Nominated—Academy Award for Best Picture; Nominated—Academy Award for Best Director; Nominated—Academy Award for Best Adapted Screenplay
October 21, 2022	All That Breathes	2022 Sundance Film Festival Grand Jury Prize in World Cinema Documentary; L'Œil d'or Nominated—Academy Award for Best Documentary Feature Film
November 18, 2022	EO	Jury Prize (Cannes Film Festival); Nominated—Palme d'Or; Nominated—Academy Award for Best International Film
December 23, 2022	No Bears	Special Jury Prize (Venice Film Festival); Nominated—Golden Lion
March 24, 2023	Tori and Lokita	Nominated—Palme d'Or
April 28, 2023	The Eight Mountains	Jury Prize (Cannes Film Festival); Nominated—Palme d'Or
July 14, 2023	Afire	Silver Bear Grand Jury Prize; Nominated—Golden Bear
October 11, 2023	Anselm	Nominated—L'Œil d'or
November 10, 2023	Orlando, My Political Biography	Teddy Award for Best Documentary Film
January 26, 2024	Tótem	Nominated—Golden Bear; Nominated—National Board of Review: Top Five International Films
February 23, 2024	About Dry Grasses	Cannes Film Festival Award for Best Actress; Nominated—Palme d'Or
April 5, 2024	The Beast	Nominated—Golden Lion
May 3, 2024	Evil Does Not Exist	Grand Jury Prize (Venice Film Festival); Best Film Award, 2023 BFI London Film Festival; Nominated—Golden Lion
June 28, 2024	Last Summer	Nominated—Palme d'Or; Nominated—César Award for Best Director; Nominated—César Award for Best Actress; Nominated—César Award for Best Male Revelation; Nominated—César Award for Best Adaptation
November 15, 2024	All We Imagine as Light	Grand Prix (Cannes Film Festival); Nominated—Palme d'Or; Nominated—National Board of Review: Top Five International Films; Nominated—Golden Globe Award for Best Non-English Language Film; Nominated—Golden Globe Award for Best Director; Nominated—BAFTA Award for Best Film Not in the English Language
December 6, 2024	Flow	Academy Award for Best Animated Feature; Golden Globe Award for Best Animated Feature Film; Nominated—Academy Award for Best International Feature Film
January 3, 2025	Vermiglio	Grand Jury Prize (Venice Film Festival); Gold Hugo, Chicago International Film Festival; David di Donatello for Best Film; Nominated—Golden Lion
March 21, 2025	Misericordia	Louis Delluc Prize; Nominated—Queer Palm; Nominated—César Award for Best Film
April 18, 2025	The Shrouds	Nominated—Palme d'Or
May 9, 2025	Caught by the Tides	Nominated—Palme d'Or
July 18, 2025	Cloud	
