= BNE =

BNE, or bne, may refer to:

- Branch if Not Equal, an assembly language instruction
- Brand New Eyes, third studio album of Paramore
- Bayesian Nash equilibrium, game theory concept
- Biblioteca Nacional de España or National Library of Spain
- BNE (artist), American graffiti artist
- BNE, the IATA code for Brisbane Airport in the state of Queensland, Australia
- bne, the ISO 639-3 code for the Bintauna language spoken in North Sulawesi, Indonesia
- BNE, the National Rail code for Bourne End railway station in the county of Buckinghamshire, UK
- BNE, the New York Stock Exchange symbol for Bowne & Co., a former US company founded in 1775
- Bandai Namco Entertainment, a Japanese multinational video game publisher
- Business New Europe, business news publishers
- Business for New Europe, an EU-UK relations group
- bne, branch not equal, an RISC-V instruction

== See also ==
- B&E or breaking and entering, burglary
