= Pass the Buck =

Pass the Buck may refer to:

- Buck passing, or passing the buck, attributing to another person or group one's own responsibility
  - "Passing the buck", in poker, passing the button (or buck) to the next dealer
- Pass the Buck (American game show), 1978
- Pass the Buck (1986 British game show)
- Pass the Buck (1998 British game show)
- Pass the Buck (Australian game show), 2002
- Pass the Buck (The Price Is Right), a pricing game on The Price Is Right
- "Pass the Buck", a song by Stereophonics from the 2007 album Pull the Pin
