= The Peaches =

1964 British short film

- Directed by: Michael Gill
- Screenplay by: Yvonne Gilan
- Produced by: Michael Gill
- Starring: Juliet Harmer; Tom Adams; Peter Ustinov
- Cinematography: Walter Lassally
- Edited by: John Priestley
- Distributed by: British Lion Film Corporation
- Release date: 1964
- Running time: 16 minutes
- Country: United Kingdom
- Language: English

The Peaches is a 1964 British short black-and-white film directed by Michael Gill and starring Juliet Harmer and Tom Adams, with narration by Peter Ustinov. It also features an appearance from nine-year-old A. A. Gill, son of the director and writer Yvonne Gilan. It was funded by the British Film Institute's Experimental Film Fund, established by Sir Michael Balcon.

In 1964 the film was the British choice for the Cannes Film Festival.

It is a sensual, surreal fantasy about a beautiful woman and her passion for peaches.

== Plot ==
The film charts the coming of age of a clever and beautiful girl and her fetish for fruit. In search of kindred spirits of like intellect, she goes to live in the city, but finds herself cleaning in "the Ministry". She falls in love, and the peaches become less important as her love grows. Subsequently, she transfers her craving to pickled onions.

== Cast ==
- Juliet Harmer as girl
- Tom Adams as boy next door
- A. A. Gill as young chess player (uncredited)

== Reception ==
The Monthly Film Bulletin wrote: "This coyly clever production would have been best described by the now outmoded adjective "twee". The initial circumstances, outlined in the opening sequences to the accompaniment of a commentary delivered by Peter Ustinov in his best dry manner, promise something sardonically amusing, but it is all developed in a very rib-nudging way. The theme loses direction, and becomes vague and pointless, with speeded-up photography jokes."

== Home media ==
The film was released as an extra on the Blu-rays Woodfall: A Revolution in British Cinema (BFI, 2018) and Die, Monster, Die! (BFI, 2024).
