= John Slim =

John Slim may refer to:

- John Slim, 2nd Viscount Slim, British peer, soldier and businessman
- John Slim (wrestler), British wrestler

== See also ==
- Slim John, a 1969 BBC English language instruction serial
