= Juliet Harmer =

English artist, children's author and actress

- Born: Juliet Linda Harmer; 11 May 1941 (age 85); St Albans, England
- Occupations: Artist; children's author; illustrator; actress
- Spouses: William Squire (1967–19??; divorced); Bill Alexander (m. 1977)
- Children: 2

Juliet Linda Harmer (born 11 May 1941) is an English artist, children's author and actress. She is best known in the role of Georgina Jones in the BBC series Adam Adamant Lives! (1966–67).

== Early life and education ==
Juliet Linda Harmer was born in St Albans, Hertfordshire. Her father was a doctor. Harmer attended boarding school in Hampshire and completed secondary school in Kent. Harmer studied at Homerton College, Cambridge and trained as a primary school teacher specialising in Art. During her time at Cambridge, she participated in amateur dramatics. She subsequently taught for two years while taking evening drama classes.

== Acting and media career ==
=== Early work ===
Harmer began her media career working for the BBC as a Schools Television presenter, contributing to programmes such as English by Television. Harmer made her professional acting debut in two 1963 episodes of the ITV medical soap opera Emergency – Ward 10 and Michael Gill's short film The Peaches (1964), a fantasy about a beautiful young woman's sensual passion for peaches written by Gill's wife, Yvonne Gilan. The latter screened at the Cannes Film Festival in 1964.

Harmer went on to appear in series such as Danger Man and Marriage Lines. She played Jill Manson, the nominal headmistress of a deserted school in the village of Little Bazeley-on-Sea in the opening episode of the fourth series of The Avengers (ABC, 1965), in which Diana Rigg appeared for the first time as Emma Peel. Towards the end of the episode the two women engaged in a memorable fight.

=== Adam Adamant Lives! ===
The original choice for the role of Georgina Jones in Adam Adamant had been Ann Holloway (later Karen Glover in the comedy series Father, Dear Father), who played the part in an untransmitted pilot in April 1966. However, Holloway's performance was deemed "not to fit the series" and Harmer was cast at short notice from some 300 applicants. She did not even have a screen test and admitted over twenty years later that she had answered affirmatively when asked if she could ride a motor scooter whereas, in fact, she could not.

==== Georgina Jones ====
Georgina Jones was a trendy Mod who dressed in the fashionable styles of the mid 1960s. She befriended Adam Adamant, an Edwardian adventurer, played by Gerald Harper, who had been frozen in time in 1902. His return to life in "Swinging London" was the signal for a succession of new adventures, in which Georgina, whom Adamant habitually referred to as "Miss Jones" and failed initially to comprehend, was usually in tow. As Harper put it in 2006, "if you have Adam Adamant from 1902 presented to Georgina who is wearing a mini-skirt which to him is appalling, you immediately have a confrontation and it's amusing".

In an interview with Russell Twisk for the Radio Times in August 1966, Harmer was described as "the Girl from Adam Adamant" (rather as Stefanie Powers was, later that year, The Girl from U.N.C.L.E.) The article emphasised that Harmer sometimes used clothes from her own wardrobe for the part of Georgina Jones, thus pitching her as a trend setter in her own right. Harmer reflected in 2006 that most of her fan mail had been from 14- or 15-year-old boys.

==== Adam Adamant in retrospect ====
There were 29 episodes of Adam Adamant, spread over two series (1966–67) but, although the show was produced by Verity Lambert, it did not achieve the ratings, critical success or overseas sales for which the BBC had hoped. Lambert regarded it in retrospect as a failure, while reflecting that it had possessed essentially all the same ingredients as the highly successful The Avengers. A third series was considered, but never commissioned.

Harper recalled Harmer as "a kooky, curious girl, but utterly beautiful and very nice". The two met again at Pinewood Studios forty years later as part of a documentary film to accompany the release on DVD of the 17 surviving episodes of Adam Adamant.

=== After Adam Adamant ===
After Adam Adamant, Harmer appeared in episodes of other television series, including Department S (1969–70) in the episodes The Man in the Elegant Room and Ticket to Nowhere, Randall and Hopkirk (Deceased) (1970), The Persuaders! (1971) (as a briefly recurring character named Prue), Bless This House (1971) and Jason King (1972), a "spin off" of Department S. Films included Quest for Love (1971), a science-fiction romance based on a story by John Wyndham, Home Before Midnight (1979), and Paris by Night (1988). She also acted in Carry On Matron (1972) but her scenes were cut from the finished film. In 1969 Harmer appeared as Stevie in Slim John, an English language instructional serial made by the BBC for overseas broadcast.

== Art and writing career ==
She returned to painting and working with children when her first daughter was born, and she moved to the Cotswolds in 1970.

Harmer had originally wanted to become a botanist; her great-uncle, Sir Sidney Frederic Harmer, had been the director of the Natural History Museum in London, and her father and grandfather, both surgeons, had encouraged her early interest in Natural History. However, after an early career as an actress, principally on television, Harmer chose to stay at home with her children and write and illustrate children's books.

Her work has been described by her editor at Egmont Children's Books, as having "an almost melodic simplicity", and an article in the Stroud News and Journal referred to its "jewel-like intensity". She says of her work: "My inspiration comes from nature, particularly from Gloucestershire, where I live, and Cornwall where the family have had many holidays. I paint what makes me happy. These fleeting moments are so precious- perhaps painting is a way of capturing them. Perhaps I also paint to compensate for a feeling of loss- the loss of innocence, the loss of childhood, and the increasing loss of our beautiful English countryside".

Harmer has written and illustrated several books, including four for children and an illuminated manuscript celebrating the healing properties of herbs and flowers.

She has exhibited her work in Gloucestershire and London and many of her paintings are in private collections in Paris, London, New York and Sydney.

== Personal life ==
Harmer married actor William Squire (1917–89) in 1967. It was his second marriage and they later divorced. Since 1977, she has been married to theatre director Bill Alexander. They have two daughters.

== Filmography ==
- The Peaches (1964) - The Girl
- Up Jumped a Swagman (1965) - Second London Girl
- Just like a Woman (1967) - Lewis's Girlfriend
- Quest for Love (1971) - Geraldine Lambert
- Home Before Midnight (1979) - Susan Wilshire
- Paris by Night (1988) - Delia

== Children's books ==
Juliet Harmer's children's books include:

- The Little Go To Sleep Book Collins
- The Rocking Horse Collins
- Sophie's Little Angel Collins
- Prayers For Children Heinemann
- The Magic of Herbs and Flowers Macmillan
- The Tale of the Two Black Cats who tried to Run Away Austin Macauley (October 2023)

In 2003 she was highly commended in the BBC Christmas Card Wildlife competition.

== Painting ==
Her paintings have been exhibited in Gloucestershire and London. Galleries include:

- The Art Gallery, Long Street, Tetbury
- Royal Society of British Artists, London
- Cheltenham Art Gallery & Museum
- The Coln Gallery Cirencester
- Leighton House Kensington

and most recently,

- Gallery 54, Shepherd Market, Mayfair, London
