= Roland Rudd =

British public relations executive

- Born: Roland Dacre Rudd; April 1961 (age 64); London, England
- Education: Millfield School
- Alma mater: Regent's Park College, Oxford
- Occupation: Public relations executive
- Employer: FGS Global
- Spouse: Sophie Hale
- Parent(s): Tony Rudd; Ethne Fitzgerald
- Relatives: Amber Rudd (sister)

Roland Dacre Rudd (born April 1961) is the founder and chairman of FGS Global (formerly Finsbury), a public relations firm, and holds a variety of other charitable and non-executive posts. Rudd was educated at Oxford University, becoming President of the Oxford Union before starting a career in journalism that he left to found Finsbury. He sold that company to WPP plc in 2001, making an estimated £40 million. He is strongly in favour of British engagement with the European Union and has campaigned for electoral reform.

== Personal life and education ==
Rudd was born in April 1961, one of four children of Tony Rudd, a stockbroker; his sisters are Amanda, Melissa and Amber, who was a Conservative Party Member of Parliament until September 2019, when she left the party over its stance on Brexit; she then sat as an independent MP until standing down at the subsequent general election.

As a child he wanted to be prime minister. He was educated at Millfield School. He read philosophy and theology at Regent's Park College, Oxford, describing himself as "perhaps a lazy Christian."

He was elected president of the Oxford Union on his third attempt. At Oxford he was friends with Hugo Dixon with whom he travelled to America to work on Walter Mondale's campaign for the Democratic Party nomination. They transferred to rival Gary Hart when Mondale could not accommodate them.

Rudd is married to Sophie Hale, a designer of womenswear.

== Career ==
After graduating, Rudd worked as a policy coordinator for David Owen and the Social Democratic Party (he was the first SDP president of the Oxford Union). He was a financial journalist at the Sunday Correspondent and the Financial Times.

At the Sunday Correspondent, Rudd became friends with Robert Peston, now political editor for ITV News, and they worked together at the Financial Times where the two were known as "the Pest and the Rat", Rudd taking the nickname in reference to the then popular children's television character Roland Rat.

In 1994, Rudd left the Financial Times to found Finsbury with Rupert Younger. Rudd told The Independent in 2011, "I was at the Financial Times, writing about M&A (mergers and acquisitions) and conglomerates. The takeover world always fascinated me. I had wanted to build my own business and could see a gap for a financial PR company which was utterly professional. Right from the start, I hired only the most financially literate staff and was determined to have the top FTSE clients." Finsbury reportedly ended up with more than a quarter of FTSE100 companies as clients.

The firm was sold to Martin Sorrell's WPP plc in 2001 in a deal estimated to have earned Rudd £40 million. In 2011, Finsbury merged with Robinson Lerer & Montgomery of New York. Rudd continued as chairman of the merged firm. In 2014, RLM Finsbury rebranded as just Finsbury.

In January 2021, Finsbury, The Glover Park Group (GPG), and Hering Schuppener completed their merger and management buy-in of 49.99%, and became known as Finsbury Glover Hering. Following the merger, Rudd and Carter Eskew, founder of GPG, served as co-chairs of the new firm. In December 2021, Finsbury Glover Hering and Sard Verbinnen & Co. merged and rebranded as FGS Global, with Rudd as global co-chair. In April 2023, Rudd helped negotiate a deal with KKR buying a 30% stake in FGS Global that valued the company at about $1.4 billion. In August 2024, Rudd helped negotiate a deal for KKR to buy WPP's controlling stake in FGS Global that valued the company at about $1.7 billion.

== Politics ==
Rudd believes in electoral reform and campaigned in support of the introduction of the Alternative vote system in the British referendum of 2011. The proposal failed. He is strongly in favour of British engagement with Europe, and is chairman of Business for New Europe, a member of the Centre for European Reform's advisory board, and was Chair of the People's Vote campaign. As chairman of the People's Vote campaign, he oversaw a boardroom coup that ended up destroying the campaign at a critical juncture in UK politics (see below).

Rudd is a supporter of the Labour Party and is close to a number of Labour politicians. Peter Mandelson is godfather to one of Rudd's children and Rudd campaigned for Mandelson in his Hartlepool constituency in the 2001 general election. Rudd was one of the "Four Wise Men" who advised Blair in 2007 on life after leaving office. Rudd has also been linked to Ed Balls and Tessa Jowell of Labour, and Nick Clegg of the Liberal Democrats. He subsequently damaged his relationship with many figures in the Labour Party and elsewhere in politics due to his controversial role in the demise of the People's Vote campaign in 2019.

== Other appointments ==
Rudd has been Chair of Tate since 2021. He serves as Specially Appointed Commissioner at the Royal Hospital Chelsea and is an ambassador for the Alzheimer’s Society. He is currently Chair of Governors at Millfield School, a trustee for the Speakers for Schools programme, and a trustee for the Made by Dyslexia campaign. Rudd is a trustee of the Bayreuth Festival and was on the Board of the Royal Opera House from 2011 to 2017. He is a visiting fellow at Oxford University's Centre for Corporate Reputation, part of the Saïd Business School.

=== Open Britain controversy ===
On 27 October 2019, Rudd used his role as the chair of Open Britain—just one of five organisations under the People's Vote umbrella—to announce he wanted to sack the campaign's director, James McGrory, and director of communications, Tom Baldwin. More than 40 staff members walked out in protest at the decision and Rudd's attempt to impose Patrick Heneghan as the campaign's interim chief executive. At a subsequent staff meeting, Rudd lost a motion of no confidence by 40 votes to 3. Baldwin had earlier accused Rudd of taking a "wrecking ball" to a successful campaign through a "boardroom coup" while failing to consult other organisations in the campaign. Rudd later resigned as chair of Open Britain but retained control of money and data through a new holding company he had formed for the purpose called Baybridge UK. In an article for the Spectator, Alastair Campbell, the former head of strategy and communications in Tony Blair's Downing Street, accused Rudd of putting his personal status ahead of efforts to stop Brexit through a new referendum. In 2020, it was announced that former employees were preparing to sue Rudd personally.

== See also ==
- Breakingviews
