= Bill Alexander (director) =

British theatre director (born 1948)

- Born: William Alexander Paterson; 23 February 1948 (age 78); Hunstanton, Norfolk, England
- Occupation: Theatre director
- Years active: 1974–present
- Known for: Richard III; The Merry Wives of Windsor
- Spouse: Juliet Harmer (m. 1977)
- Children: 2

William Alexander Paterson (born 23 February 1948) known professionally as Bill Alexander is a British theatre director who is best known for his work with the Royal Shakespeare Company and as artistic director of Birmingham Repertory Theatre. He currently works as a freelance, internationally as a theatre director and most recently as a director of BBC Radio 4 drama.

== Early years ==
William Alexander Paterson was born in Hunstanton, Norfolk, England, on 23 February 1948 to William and Rosemary Paterson (née McCormack). He was a boarder at St. Lawrence College, Ramsgate, Kent before going on to Keele University (1969–1973) where he studied English and founded an experimental theatre group called Guerilla Theatre based on the principles of the Polish theatre director Jerzy Grotowski.

== Early career ==
In 1974, Alexander began his career as a Trainee Director at the Bristol Old Vic. His productions included Butley by Simon Gray, How the Other Half Loves by Alan Ayckbourn, Shakespeare's Twelfth Night, Blythe Spirit by Noël Coward. In 1975 he joined the Royal Court Theatre as an assistant director. His production of Class Enemy by Nigel Williams won the Binkie Beaumont Award for Best New Director.

== At the Royal Shakespeare Company ==
Alexander joined the RSC in 1977 as assistant to Trevor Nunn and John Barton. Initially, he worked in the RSC's two studio theatres: The Warehouse in London (primarily devoted to new plays) and The Other Place in Stratford (dedicated to a mixture of new plays and the re-discovery of classics by performing them on a small scale). He also worked at The Pit studio space which replaced The Warehouse when the RSC moved to the Barbican.

In 14 years at the RSC, Alexander's studio productions included Factory Birds by James Robson (Warehouse), Captain Swing by Peter Whelan (TOP), Tartuffe by Molière (PIT), Volpone by Ben Jonson (TOP and PIT), The Accrington Pals by Peter Whelan (Warehouse), Cymbeline by William Shakespeare (TOP and PIT) with Harriet Walter as Imogen.

Alexander's first production on the RSC main stage was Richard III (with Antony Sher as Richard) in 1984. This production, for which Anthony Sher won the Olivier Award for Best Actor later transferred to the Barbican.

In 1980 he directed Harold Pinter's Betrayal at the Cameri Theatre, Tel Aviv.

In 1986, Alexander's production of The Merry Wives of Windsor won him the Laurence Olivier Award for Best Director. In 2014, Michael Billington, The Guardian's theatre critic, chose this production as one of his 'Best'.

Alexander's other productions for the RSC included A Midsummer Nights Dream (1986) with Sean Bean as Robin Starveling, Twelfth Night with Harriet Walter as Viola, and Deborah Findlay as Olivia 1987/88,The Merchant of Venice with Antony Sher as Shylock in 1987, Cymbeline with David Bradley and Harriet Walter in 1998, Much Ado About Nothing in 1991, The Taming of the Shrew in 1992, and Titus Andronicus in 2003. About the latter Alexander said,"I've also discovered what I like about Titus: it's the best play about revenge that I can think of. Revenge is such a difficult idea to deal with. Everyone knows it's "a bad thing", yet everyone understands the phrase "revenge is sweet". Titus shows revenge's seductiveness, the impulse in us all that the law is there to control. It is a work of lurid genius because it reminds us of the fundamental truths about the role of law in a just society."

== Birmingham Repertory Theatre ==
Alexander left the RSC to become artistic director and Chief Executive of the Birmingham Repertory Theatre in 1992. His productions there included:

- 1993 Othello
- 1993 The Snowman adapted from the book by Raymond Briggs
- 1993 The Merchant of Venice
- 1993 Old Times by Harold Pinter
- 1994 The Tempest
- 1995 Macbeth with James Purefoy
- 1995 The Servant by Robin Maugham
- 1995 The Way of the World by William Congreve
- 1996 The Alchemist (later transferred to the National Theatre)
- 1996Divine Right by Peter Whelan
- 1998 Hamlet
- 1998 Frozen by Bryony Lavery (later transferred to the National Theatre)
- 1999 Nativity by Peter Whelan
- 2000 Twelfth Night
- 2000 Absurd Person Singular by Alan Ayckbourn

== Later work ==
Alexander's work since 2000 has included:

- 2001 - Theatre Clwyd - An Enemy of the People
- 2001 - Northampton Rep - The Importance of Being Earnest
- 2002 - National Theatre - Frozen (Bryony Lavery), revival of Alexander's award-winning production starring Josie Lawrence, Anita Dobson and Tom Georgeson
- 2003 - National Theatre - Mappa Mundi (Shelagh Stephenson), world premiere starring Lia Williams and Alun Armstrong
- 2004 - RSC - Titus Andronicus starring David Bradley
- 2005 - RSC - King Lear starring Corin Redgrave
- 2007 - Zurich Ballet -A Midsummer Night's Dream
- 2008 - Mark Taper Forum Los Angeles - The School of the Night (Peter Whelan), revival of Alexander's award-winning production for the RSC
- 2009 - Nottingham Playhouse - Glamour (Stephen Lowe)
- 2011 - The Arts Theatre London - Bette and Joan (Anton Burge)
- 2011 – 2015 Productions at LAMDA: Twelfth Night, Summerfolk, Measure for Measure, The Merchant of Venice.
- 2012 - NWCTC Portland USA - Othello
- 2012 - UK tour - Bette and Joan (Anton Burge)
- 2014 – 2015 Summer school for Shakespeare in Italy at University of Urbino.
- 2015 BBC Radio4 Classic Serial - The Sea, The Sea (starring Jeremy Irons)
- 2015 Production at Bristol Old Vic Theatre School of The Merchant of Venice.
- 2017 Bristol Old Vic Theatre School - The Two Gentlemen of Verona
- 2017 LAMDA - As You Like It
- 2017 voice-over for 50 Years of Fish & Chips
- 2018 Bristol Old Vic Theatre School - The Taming of the Shrew
- 2020 Shakespeare in Italy - a specialist blog, Shakespeare in the rehearsal room https://www.shakespeareinitaly.org.uk/News-Blog/Blog
- 2021 A Merchant of Venice - Playground Theatre, with the Chronicle Theatre Company, formerly Shakespeare in Italy, London
- 2022 Exploring Shakespeare: Director's Notes from the Rehearsal Room Nick Hern Books

== Awards ==
In 1978, Alexander received the Binkie Beaumont Award for Best New Director and in 1986, the Laurence Olivier Award for Best Director for The Merry Wives of Windsor at the RSC.

== Personal life ==
In 1977, Alexander married actor and painter Juliet Harmer. They have two daughters.
