= Home Before Midnight =

1978 British film by Pete Walker

- UK DVD cover
- Directed by: Pete Walker
- Written by: Murray Smith; Michael Armstrong
- Story by: Pete Walker
- Produced by: Pete Walker
- Starring: James Aubrey; Alison Elliott; Mark Burns; Juliet Harmer; Richard Todd
- Cinematography: Peter Jessop
- Edited by: Alan Brett
- Music by: Jigsaw; Ray Russell
- Production company: Peter Walker (Heritage)
- Distributed by: Anchor Bay Entertainment
- Release date: 18 October 1979 (UK)
- Running time: 111 minutes
- Country: United Kingdom
- Language: English

Home Before Midnight is a 1979 British sexploitation drama film directed and produced by Pete Walker, written by Murray Smith, and starring James Aubrey, Alison Elliott and Richard Todd.

== Plot ==
The film is set in London and follows Mike Beresford, a 28-year-old songwriter who is charged with statutory rape after having sex with a 14-year-old girl.

== Cast ==
- James Aubrey as Mike Beresford
- Alison Elliott as Ginny Wilshire
- Mark Burns as Harry Wilshire
- Juliet Harmer as Susan Wilshire
- Richard Todd as Geoffrey Steele
- Debbie Linden as Carol
- Andy Forray as Vince Owen
- Chris Jagger as Nick
- Sharon Maughan as Helen Owen
- Charles Collingwood as Burlingham
- Faith Kent as Miss Heatherton
- John Hewer as Donelly
- Jeff Rawle as Johnnie McGee
- Patrick Barr as Judge
- Edward de Souza as Archer
- Ian Sharrock as Malcolm
- Emma Jacobs as Lindy
- Leonard Kavanagh as Mr. Beresford
- Joan Pendleton as Mrs. Beresford
- Ivor Roberts as Inspector Gray
- Claire McClellan as Tracey Wilshire
- Nicholas Young as Ray

== Production ==
The soundtrack for the film, excluding incidental music provided by Ray Russell, was written and performed by British band Jigsaw. These songs were later released on a soundtrack album.

== Reception ==
The Monthly Film Bulletin wrote: "After Pete Walker's series of energetic horror shockers, this cautionary tale proves limp and deathly slow-moving. Quite lacking in a sense of emotional involvement, and notably confused in its view of the social mores of Outer London, the film seems bafflingly to miss its mark at every level. Inter alia, it asks us to accept that a teenage girl would be embarrassed at addressing a twenty-six-year-old woman by her first name, that a TV interview would be transmitted complete with lubricious remarks about a third party, and that during a High Court trial witnesses would be permitted to stand idly chatting in the shadow of the dock."

== Bibliography ==
- Sweet, Matthew (2005). Shepperton Babylon: The Lost Worlds of British Cinema. Faber and Faber.
