= Nicola Formby =

South African model, actress and journalist

- Born: Nicola Elizabeth Formby; 22 April 1965 (age 61); South Africa
- Occupations: Journalist, food consultant
- Years active: 1983–present
- Partner: A. A. Gill (m. 1995; died 2016)
- Children: 2

Nicola Elizabeth Formby (born 22 April 1965) is a South African journalist, company director and food consultant, and a former model and actress.

== Life and career ==
Born in South Africa in 1965, Formby has recalled that while she was growing up there "dogs lived in kennels outside and never ever came into the house with their muddy paws". She came to England and was educated at Wellington College, Berkshire. In her teens, David Bailey photographed her for a magazine cover and said she reminded him of Julie Christie. This led to modelling work for Clairol and Wella and to TV commercials in Germany.

From modelling, Formby went on to appear in the Ben Elton comedy The Man from Auntie (1990). She played the leading role of Diana, Princess of Wales, in the three-hour television movie The Women of Windsor (1992), about the lives of Diana and Sarah, Duchess of York. She also appeared in the television series Bugs and The All New Alexei Sayle Show (1995). Moving into journalism, Formby became editor-at-large of Tatler and is also a food consultant for Pret a Manger and Itsu.

== Personal life ==
From 1995 until his death in 2016, Formby was the partner of A. A. Gill, author and restaurant critic of The Sunday Times, who left his wife Amber Rudd for her and in his columns called her "The Blonde". They had twins together, a boy and a girl, born in 2007. Michael Bywater wrote of them "He and Nicola Formby are a Power Couple, which we hate, don't we?"

A feud between Gill and Piers Morgan may have originated when Morgan described Formby as a "sex kitten on whom the mists of time had taken their toll" and claimed she had shown him "porn shots" of herself. Gill said Morgan had made this up and called him a "pretty objectionable self-publicist".
