= Tony Rudd (stockbroker) =

British stockbroker and venture capitalist

- Born: Riley Anthony Winton Rudd; 24 April 1924; Wandsworth, London, England
- Died: 29 May 2017 (aged 93); Kensington, London, England
- Education: Blundell's School
- Alma mater: University College, Oxford
- Occupation: Stockbroker
- Spouse: Ethne FitzGerald (m. 1952)
- Children: 4, including Roland and Amber

Riley Anthony Winton Rudd (24 April 1924 – 29 May 2017) was an English stockbroker who found success in the world of technology start-ups, but came under censure from the Department of Trade and Industry for his business practices. Among his children were the politician Amber Rudd and the public relations executive Roland Rudd.

== Early life ==
Tony Rudd was born in Wandsworth, London, on 24 April 1924 to the businessman Frederick Rudd and a Miss Maguire, later being brought up by Frederick's ex wife Grace Winton Rudd (née Brown). He was educated at Blundell's School before going up to University College, Oxford, to read Philosophy, Politics and Economics. His studies were interrupted by the Second World War during which he served as a navigator for a Polish squadron in the Royal Air Force. He flew in Mosquitos and had to bail out over Germany with his pilot after their aircraft was hit by fire from a United States aircraft in a friendly fire incident. His memoirs of his time in the RAF were published in 1990 as One Boy's War. After the war, Rudd returned to Oxford to complete his studies.

== Career ==
In 1949, Rudd joined the Bank of England. Three years later he became the bank's representative in Washington. In 1955 he switched to journalism at the Manchester Guardian where he covered the Suez Crisis from Egypt before joining the paper's city desk.

In 1967, Rudd opened his own stockbroking firm, Rowe Rudd, in London Wall, which was one of the first to use a large open-plan trading room. Among those who worked for him were Michael Spencer, founder of Icap, Brian Griffiths who became head of policy for Margaret Thatcher, and Tony "the animal" Parnes who became embroiled in the Guinness scandal.

Novelist Jeffrey Archer became a client and was inspired to write Not a Penny More, Not a Penny Less (1976). Rudd enjoyed success as the broker to technology companies including Racal Electronics, Rotork and Plessey but the onset of blindness forced him to give up stockbroking in 1981. The following year Rowe Rudd bought the old merchant house David Sassoon & Co. for around £2 million. Although now fully controlled by Rowe Rudd, David Sassoon & Co continued to operate independently.

Tony Rudd turned to venture capitalism but came under increasing scrutiny from the Department of Trade and Industry (DTI) and in the satirical current affairs magazine Private Eye over his business practices. In 1988, the DTI described him in a report as unfit to be a director of "any company whether private or public". The extent to which he continued to be involved in the day-to-day running of the family investment vehicle, despite his daughter Amber's becoming the director at the age of 24, was raised in the press when her political career took off.

== Personal life ==
In 1952, Rudd married Ethne Etain FitzGerald, a history graduate from the University of Oxford. She was the daughter of Maurice Pembroke Fitzgerald, QC (grandson of the judge and Liberal politician John FitzGerald, Baron FitzGerald of Kilmarnock), and Christine Fitzgerald (née Bradhurst; daughter of Augustus Maunsell Bradhurst). Among their children were the British home secretary Amber Rudd and the public relations executive Roland Rudd. Rudd and his wife also had two other children, Amanda and Melissa.

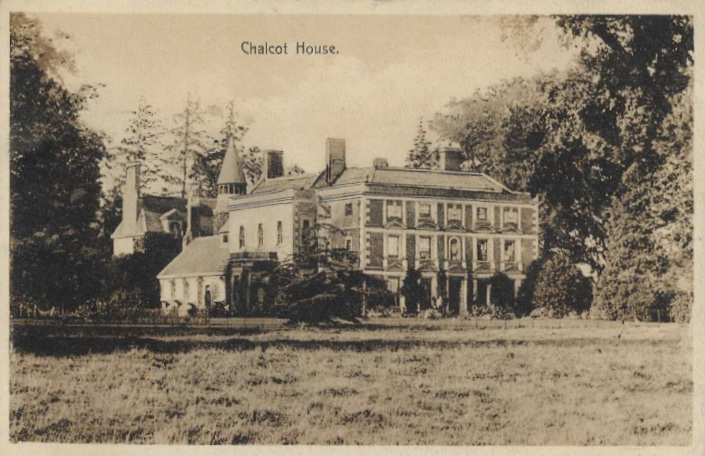
Chalcot House

Rudd owned a townhouse in Kensington, and Chalcot House near Westbury, Wiltshire, where in later life he and his wife entertained a circle of political and business friends including Peter Walker, Arnold Weinstock, and Alan Clark. When their daughter Amber got the job of "aristocracy co-ordinator" for the film Four Weddings and a Funeral, she hired her parents as extras for £100 per day and Tony Rudd appeared in the wedding scenes; he was required to use his own morning suit to save on production costs.

== Death ==
Rudd died on 29 May 2017. Just days after his death, his daughter Amber appeared on British television to represent the Conservative Party in a debate for the United Kingdom General Election of June 2017. Her brother Roland commented, "My parents had a strong view about carrying on. He would have wanted her to do the debate".

== Selected publications ==
- One boy's war. Quartet, London, 1990. ISBN 0704327600
