= Robert Meadmore =

British singer and actor

Robert Meadmore is a British singer and actor.

== Theatre ==
Born in Romford the son of an opera singer who was later a stage director for the D'Oyly Carte Opera Company, Meadmore has starred as leading man in many popular productions in London's West End including Phantom of The Opera (Raoul), Hello, Dolly! (Cornelius), Brigadoon (Tommy), My Fair Lady (Freddy), Bless the Bride (Pierre), The Gondoliers (Guieseppe), Oklahoma! (Curly), The Best Little Whorehouse in Texas (Jay), Metropolitan Mikado, two separate productions of Camelot (Lancelot) and most recently "Dear World".

In London he has also appeared in Starting Here, Starting Now, Side by Side by Sondheim, It Takes Two, Robert Meadmore in Concert, Moving On and Dorothy Fields Forever. In Chichester his appearances include Cavell, Patriot for Me (also in the United States), Goodbye, Mr. Chips, Valmouth and Pickwick (London and National Tour). In repertory theatre, he appeared in Oleanna, Educating Rita, Under Their Hats and Wife Begins at Forty.

== Concerts ==
In 2001 Meadmore participated in the Royal Variety Performance singing "All I Ask of You" with Charlotte Church, as a tribute to Andrew Lloyd Webber. He also sang at the 2002 Queens Golden Jubilee celebrations in the Mall, London, leading a crowd of over fifty thousand, including the Royal Family, in singing "You'll Never Walk Alone". In 2010 Meadmore performed the first concert on the maiden voyage of Cunard's newly launched MS Queen Elizabeth and has performed cabaret in London at the Green Room, the Pheasantry and Crazy Coqs.

== Film and television ==
Meadmore's film and television work includes John Henry, Litvinenko, ITVX Dir: Jim Field Smith, Tiger Aspect Productions, Shadow Play, Eine Kleine Grossmusik, Tonight at 8.30, Saturday Night Out, Rita Rudner Show, Julia and Company, Live from Lincoln Center, A Tribute to Alan Jay Lerner, Treacherous Crossing (Movie of the week USA), The Women of Windsor (CBS) and two Royal Variety Performances.

== Radio and recordings ==
Meadmore is a regular radio broadcaster for BBC Radio 4, including "Oenanthe and the Beanstalk" and "Friday Night is Music Night", and he has sung in recorded versions of musicals for BBC Radio 2, including "Mack and Mabel", "Mame", "My Fair Lady", "La Cage aux Folles", "Hello Dolly!" and "Camelot". Along with many cast recordings, his recordings include "The Songs of Maltby and Shire", "Moving On" "Musicals with a Message" "Get Happy" "Be My Love" and "That’s What Friends are For" with Peter Land, directed by Gillian Lynne and performed in both New York and London.

In 2005, Meadmore recorded his first classical album After a Dream, under the direction of Mike Batt. The album reached number 2 in the UK Classical Charts and was nominated for an "Album of The Year" Classical Brit Award.
