= The Women of Windsor =

Canadian film of 1992 by Steven Hilliard Stern

- Directed by: Steven Hilliard Stern
- Starring: Sallyanne Law; Nicola Formby; Jim Piddock; Robert Meadmore
- Country of origin: Canada
- Original language: English

Production
- Producer: John Danylkiw
- Running time: 182 minutes

Original release
- Network: CBS
- Release: October 25, 1992

The Women of Windsor is a Canadian television movie of 1992 telling the stories of Diana, Princess of Wales, and Sarah, Duchess of York, directed by Steven Hilliard Stern.

The movie was filmed in Toronto and London.

== Cast ==
- Nicola Formby as Diana, Princess of Wales
- Sallyanne Law as Sarah, Duchess of York
- Robert Meadmore as Prince Andrew, Duke of York
- Jim Piddock as Charles, Prince of Wales
- Carolyn Sadowska as Queen Elizabeth II
- David Fox as Major Ferguson
- Dixie Seatle as Camilla Parker Bowles
- Deborah Burgess as Anne, Princess Royal
- Alan Murley as Mark Phillips
- Trulie MacLeod as Princess Margaret, Countess of Snowdon
- Ron Payne as Prince Philip, Duke of Edinburgh
- Nigel Bennett as Lawson
- Eugene Robert Glazer
- Deborah Duchêne as Alice
- Barbara Gordon as Downing
- Neil Munro as Tony
- Donald Carrier as Private Secretary
- Dan Lett as Assistant Press Secretary
- Adam Bramble as Doctor
- Torri Higginson as Gwen
- Kristina Nicoll as Priscilla
- John Swindells as Police Instructor
- Leslie Tidd as Duke of Cumberland
- Claire Crawford as Duchess of Cumberland
- Edd Scorpio as Royal Chauffeur
