= Georgina Jones =

Fictional character

Miss Georgina Jones is a fictional character played by Juliet Harmer in the BBC television adventure series, Adam Adamant Lives! (1966-7).

== Genesis of the character ==
Adam Adamant was created by Richard Harris and Donald Cotton, with significant creative input by script editor Tony Williamson and the BBC's Head of Television Drama, Sydney Newman. The series was produced by Verity Lambert. The female lead was originally to have been called Sandy, but the name Georgina Jones (sometimes "George" or "Georgie" to her friends) had been adopted by the time of a 1966 pilot in which the part was played by Ann Holloway. Holloway was replaced in the series itself by Juliet Harmer.

== Miss Jones and Adam Adamant ==
Adam Adamant was an adventurer who, having foiled a plot to assassinate King Edward VII, had been cryopreserved by his enemies in 1902 and had come back to life in 1966. Miss Jones' grandfather, Sam Jones, had met him at Henley Regatta in 1901. She herself claimed that Adamant had been a childhood hero of hers and that she had been a witness to the demolition of his former home in the mid-1950s.

From the very start, when she found him stumbling in the vicinity of Piccadilly Circus, Miss Jones (whom Adamant rarely addressed by her first name) was Adamant's staunch friend and supporter. These were characteristics that Adamant, who was coming to terms with a very different world to that which he had left over sixty years earlier, did not always appreciate.

=== Swinging sixties v. Edwardian values ===
Miss Jones worked in a discothèque, which was subject to a vicious protection racket, and lived in a flat which, among other things, displayed a large letter "G" above her single bed. Her clothes typified those of "Swinging London" - a John Lennon-style cap, striped tops, miniskirts – and she rode around on a Vespa motor scooter.

This was all quite baffling to Adamant, with his Edwardian attitudes to women; in fact, when he first met her, he thought that she was a boy. His initial reluctance to use Miss Jones' flat as an overnight refuge and a scene in which he sees her win a beauty contest and then catches her half-undressed after the show illustrated both his prudery (or maybe, in the latter instance, surprise at the contrast between 1960s' lingerie and Edwardian corsetry) and her lack of inhibition. However, aided and abetted by Miss Jones, Adamant picked up where he had left off at the turn of the century, fighting evil in his own inimitable way.

Miss Jones also had a slightly awkward relationship with Adamant's manservant, a former music hall artist named William E. Simms (Jack May), who was acquired during an adventure in Blackpool.

There were 29 episodes of Adam Adamant, of which 17 survive.

== Notes ==
Adam Adamant Lives!
Juliet Harmer — Gerald Harper — Jack May

Character: Georgina Jones

Creator: Sydney Newman — Producer: Verity Lambert
