= Yvonne Gilan =

British actress (1931–2018)

- Born: Yvonne Janette Gilan; 12 October 1931; Edinburgh, Scotland
- Died: 14 June 2018 (aged 86); London, England
- Occupations: Actress, writer, vocal coach
- Years active: 1961–1994
- Spouse: Michael Gill (m. 1951; div. 1978)
- Children: Nicholas Gill; A. A. Gill

Yvonne Janette Gilan (12 October 1931 – 14 June 2018) was a Scottish actress who is best known for her portrayal of Mme. Peignoir in Fawlty Towers (episode "The Wedding Party") and minor roles in both EastEnders and French Fields. She was married to the television director Michael Gill, and was the mother of the late journalist, Adrian, known as A. A. Gill.

== Early work ==
In 1964, Gilan wrote a short fantasy film, The Peaches, starring Juliet Harmer, with a small cameo role for her son Adrian as a bespectacled chess player. The film became the British choice for the Cannes Film Festival, and won several international awards. Her comic skills were displayed earlier in Alan Bennett's comedy series On the Margin (1966).

Gilan's acting career on television also included roles as Vera Cowley in Z-Cars (1967), Dixon of Dock Green (1969), Crossroads (1976) as Eileen Blythe, several roles in Dr. Finlay's Casebook (1963–69) and as Ruth Bannister The House of Eliott. Her film credits included Mrs Braithwaite Agatha (1979), Mrs Liddell in Chariots of Fire (1981), and Mrs Lockwood in Empire of the Sun (1987).

=== Fawlty Towers (1975) ===
Gilan's appearance in Fawlty Towers episode "The Wedding Party", first transmitted on BBC2 on 3 October 1975, was as a French antiques dealer who seemed to have a soft spot for hotel owner Basil Fawlty. He, in turn, indulged her a little, while fending off her hints at a nocturnal encounter while she was under the influence of alcohol ('a little tipsy', as she put it). Her character had an unusual take on his character: 'Are you a romantic, Mr. Fawlty..? Well, I think you are. I think beneath that English exterior throbs a passion that would make Lord Byron look like a tobacconist.' After announcing that, due to the summer heat, she would sleep "au naturel tonight", subsequently she teased Fawlty that he had left his cassette player in her room as an excuse to gain entry, during the night.

In May 2009, satellite channel G.O.L.D. screened Fawlty Towers: Re-Opened, a one-off special that brought the original Fawlty Towers cast back together for the first time since the most notorious hotel Torquay had closed down; within, Gilan was interviewed and suggested that her French accent now sounded to her more like a Hungarian accent.

== Later career ==
From 1980 onwards, Gilan worked as a motivational speaker at the Oxford Said Business School, helping leaders improve their presentation and communication skills, and lectured at Imperial College, London. She was awarded Fellowships from both the London Business School and the Saïd Business School.

In 2003, Gilan was consulted on picking the right voice for the 118 118 directory enquiry service.

== Personal life ==
At the University of Edinburgh, Gilan met Michael Gill, later to have a career as a television director and producer; they married in 1951 and had two sons, Adrian and Nicholas. Their marriage was dissolved in 1978.

Gilan's younger son Nicholas (Nick), a talented chef, unaccountably disappeared in 1998 and was reported in 2005 as not having been heard from since. 'He was an incredibly successful Michelin-starred chef, but he had reached rock bottom.'

Her older son, Adrian, a newspaper columnist and writer, was known professionally as A. A. Gill. In his autobiography, Adrian described his mother's appearance and characteristics as he recalled them from childhood:

Physical, gamine, a thick shock of short black hair with a heavy fringe. Freckles, dark complexion. A witty, interested, boyish face, but provocative, mocking, with an exhibitionist smile that is not altogether humorous ... Her smile can wither or zap like Dan Dare's ray gun.

Gilan kept the letters that Adrian wrote to her from his boarding school, St Christopher School, Letchworth, Hertfordshire, and returned them to him half a century later. He died on 10 December 2016, at the age of 62.

Gilan died of breast and lung cancer on 14 June 2018.

== Filmography ==
Year	Title	Role	Notes
1961	They Made History	Stephens	
1961	The Seven Faces of Jim	Judith Chalmers	
1962	Television Club	Mrs. Simpson	
1966	On The Margin		6 Episodes
1967	Z Cars	Vera Cowley	2 Episodes
1968	The Troubleshooters	Allison MacKenzie	
1968	BBC Play of the Month	Sister Marthe	
1968	Detective	Georgia Strangeways	
1975	Fawlty Towers	Mme. Peignoir	S1E3: The Wedding Party
1979	Agatha	Mrs Braithwaite	
1981	Chariots of Fire	Mrs Liddell	
1983	Another Time, Another Place	Jess	
1987	Empire of the Sun	Mrs Lockwood	
1994	The House of Eliott	Faith Bannister	
2009	Fawlty Towers: Re-Opened	Herself	One-off special: G.O.L.D
