= Simon Williams (actor) =

British actor

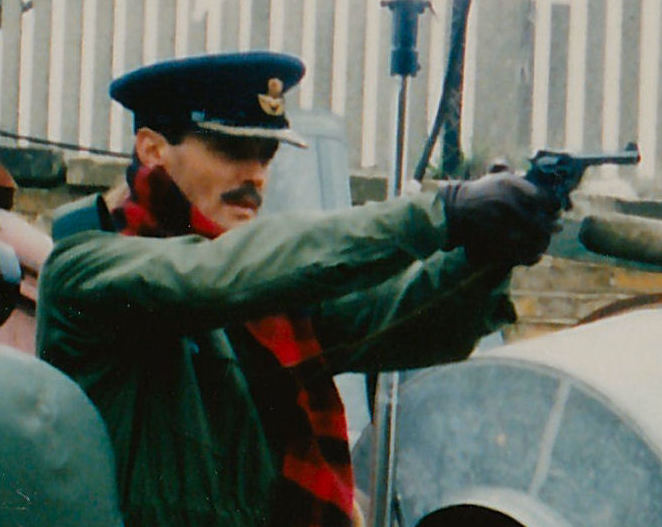
- Williams in Doctor Who: Remembrance of the Daleks
- Born: 16 June 1946 (age 80); Windsor, Berkshire, England
- Occupation: Actor
- Years active: 1967–present
- Notable work: Upstairs Downstairs (1971–1975); Agony (1979–1981); Doctor Who (1988) dinnerladies (1998); Holby City (2000–2003); EastEnders (2017)
- Spouses: Belinda Carroll (divorced); Lucy Fleming (m. 1986)
- Children: 2

Simon Williams (born 16 June 1946) is a British actor known for playing James Bellamy in the period drama Upstairs, Downstairs. Frequently playing upper middle class or aristocratic upper class roles, he is also known for playing Charles Cartwright in the sitcom Don't Wait Up and Sir Charles Merrick in medical drama Holby City. Since 2014, he has played the character of Justin Elliott in the long-running BBC Radio 4 series The Archers.

== Early life and education ==
Simon Williams was born in Windsor in 1946. His parents were the actor Hugh Williams and the actress and model Margaret Vyner. His sister Polly, an actress, married his Don't Wait Up co-star and friend Nigel Havers. She died in 2004. His brother is the poet Hugo Williams.

Williams was educated at Harrow School. He trained in repertory at Worthing, Birmingham and Bath, and later joined the Theatre Workshop.

== Career ==
Williams has appeared on stage in many productions, and has also directed a number of plays. He first appeared on television in 1967 in Man in a Suitcase, and in 1969 played the lead role in Slim John. He got his big break in 1971 when he made his first appearance as James Bellamy in the Upstairs, Downstairs episode "Board Wages". Williams would go on to appear in 37 episodes until the penultimate episode "All the King's Horses" in 1975. Following this, he appeared in Wodehouse Playhouse. From 1979 to 1981, he played Laurence Lucas in Agony, a role he reprised in 1995 in Agony Again. His film career includes appearances in The Touchables (1968), The Breaking of Bumbo (1970), The Blood on Satan's Claw (1971), Three for All (1976), The Incredible Sarah (1976), Jabberwocky (1977), The Uncanny (1977) and The Odd Job (1978). He also appeared in with Peter Sellers in The Prisoner of Zenda (1979), and The Fiendish Plot of Dr. Fu Manchu (1980). In 1996, he voiced the Bishop in The Willows in Winter.

In 1981, he played Buddo in the TV series Kinvig. He also played Nigel Pennington-Smythe in the TV reunion film Return of the Man from U.N.C.L.E. (1983). In 1985 he appeared in Juliet Bravo, later that year Williams replaced Richard Heffer to play Dr. Charles Cartwright in the sitcom Don't Wait Up, a role Williams continued for three series until 1990. In 1988, he appeared as Group Captain Gilmore in the Doctor Who serial "Remembrance of the Daleks", he later reprised the role in the audio series Counter-Measures and its follow-up The New Counter-Measures. The same year he also appeared as Roger in the Minder episode "An Officer and a Car Salesman". He also was a guest star on the television series Cluedo where he played murder victim Mr. Chapman. He was a celebrity player on Pass the Buck on Christmas Eve 1986.

Williams also played Captain Hastings in several BBC Radio 4 adaptations of Agatha Christie novels, starring John Moffatt as Hercule Poirot.

In 1990 he appeared in the pilot of The Alleyn Mysteries, in which he played Roderick Alleyn, which was later recast with Patrick Malahide. In 1992 he starred in the series The Mixer, his co-star was Jeremy Clyde of Chad & Jeremy fame. He appeared as Lord Robert St. Simon in The Case-Book of Sherlock Holmes feature-length episode The Eligible Bachelor (1993) and he appeared as Charles Elliot in the 1997 film The Opium War. Williams has also had recurring roles as Gerald Trigg in Law and Disorder in 1994 and Sir Charles Merrick in Holby City from 2000 to 2003.

In 2000, he appeared on BBC Radio's Just a Minute. In 2002 he appeared in the film The Gathering Storm, and has also appeared in the Doctor Who audio drama Nekromanteia. In 2008, he appeared in an episode of the BBC spy series Spooks as bank owner Sir Francis Denham. In 2009, Williams returned to the fictional world of Holby to make a one-off appearance in Casualty as Professor de Silva, the father of junior doctor Toby de Silva. In 2010, he appeared as Lord Godwyn in the television series Merlin in the episode "The Changeling".

Williams has appeared in episodes of Bergerac, Dangerfield, dinnerladies, The Scarlet Pimpernel, Dalziel and Pascoe, Bad Girls, The Inspector Lynley Mysteries, Midsomer Murders, Starhunter 2300, Cutting It, Heartbeat, Family Affairs, Doctors, The Bill, Diamond Geezer 2, Kingdom and First Among Equals.

In 2010, Williams contributed to the CD We Will Remember Them, published by the Royal British Legion, where he read three of the poems. Williams has also written two novels, Talking Oscars and Kill the Lights, and has written several plays. In early November 2007, he performed in Curtain up! Lights up! Cock up! at the Jermyn Street Theatre near Piccadilly Circus in London.

Williams made a guest appearance in the fourth season of the Canadian series Murdoch Mysteries, in 2011. The episode was entitled "Downstairs, Upstairs" in honour of the actor's famous role. He has also appeared in a stage adaptation of Chariots of Fire (2012), in the BBC television series Father Brown (2015), in BBC One soap EastEnders (2017), in Alan Bennett's play Allelujah (2018), as Stanton in the ghost story Martin's Close for the BBC, in the BBC television series Shakespeare & Hathaway: Private Investigators (2020), and as Joe Biden in the play The 47th by Mike Bartlett (2022).

== Selected filmography ==
Year	Title	Role	Notes
1967	Man in a Suitcase	Pat Lestrange	Episode: "The Bridge"
1968	The Touchables	Nigel Brent	Film
1969–1970	Slim John	Slim John	26 Episodes
1970	The Breaking of Bumbo	Crutcher	Film
1971	The Blood on Satan's Claw	Peter Edmonton	Film
1971–1975	Upstairs, Downstairs	James Bellamy	37 episodes
1972	The Regiment	Eugene	Episode: "The Father of the Regiment"
1975	Three for All	Harry Bingley	Film
1976	The Incredible Sarah	Henri de Linge	Film
1976	Wodehouse Playhouse	Sidney McMurdo	Story: "Feet of Clay"
1977	Jabberwocky	The Prince	Film
1977	Mr. Big	Mr. Bunny Heseltine	Episode: "Burgle My Neighbour"
1977	The Uncanny	Michael	Film
1978	The Odd Job	Tony Sloane	Film
1979	The Prisoner of Zenda	Fritz	Film
1979–1981	Agony	Laurence Lucas	20 episodes
1980	Company and Co.	Simon Company	7 episodes
1980	The Fiendish Plot of Dr. Fu Manchu	Robert Townsend	Film
1981	Kinvig	Buddo	5 episodes
1983	Return of the Man from U.N.C.L.E.	Nick Pennington-Smythe	TV movie
1984	Hammer House of Mystery and Suspense	Bob Appleyard	Story: "The Late Nancy Irving"
1985	Juliet Bravo	Hugo Edward-Venner/ Mr. Jarvis	Episode: "Hostage to Fortune"
1985–1990	Don't Wait Up	Dr. Charles Cartwright	16 episodes
1986	First Among Equals	Alexander Dalgish	5 episodes
1988	Doctor Who	Gilmore	Serial: "Remembrance of the Daleks" (4 episodes)
1988	Minder	Roger	Episode: "An Officer and a Car Salesman"
1990	Alleyn Mysteries	Chief Inspector Roderick Alleyn	Episode: "Artists in Crime"
1990	Cluedo	Mr. Chapman	Episode: "Politcian's Funeral"
1991	Bergerac	Rupert Draper	Episode: "All for Love"
1992	The Upper Hand	Geoffrey	Episode: "The Proposal"
1992–1993	The Mixer	Sir Anthony Rose	12 episodes
1993	The Case-Book of Sherlock Homes	Lord Robert St. Simon	Episode: "The Eligible Bachelor"
1993	Demob	Ken Hawkes	1 episode
1993	Paul Merton: The Series	Lord	1 episode
1994	Law and Disorder	Gerald Triggs	6 episodes
1995	Agony Again	Laurence Lucas	2 episodes
1996	The Willows in Winter	Bishop (voice)	TV movie
1997	The Opium War	Charles Elliot	Film
1997	Pilgrim's Rest	Malcolm	Episode: "Rock of Ages"
1998	Dangerfield	Simon Harris	Episode: "Angel"
1998	Dinnerladies	The Duke of Danby	Episode: "Royals"
1999	Dalziel and Pascoe	Sir Thomas Partridge	Episode: "Recalled for Life"
1999	Pig Heart Boy	Professor Rae	4 episodes
2000	The Scarlet Pimpernel	Henry Cavendish	Episode: "Friends and Enemies"
2000–2003	Holby City	Sir Charles Merrick	6 episodes
2002	The Gathering Storm	Terence Philip	TV movie
2003	Bad Girls	Oliver Lilley	1 episode
2004	Cutting It	Father Rafe	1 episode
2004	Heartbeat	Colonel Maltravers	Episode: "Precious Stones"
2004	The Inspector Lynley Mysteries	Jeremy Britton	Episode: "In Pursuit of the Proper Sinner"
2004	Starhunter	Executive Chief Inspector Tibbit	Episode: "Negative Energy"
2005	Family Affairs	Howard Stokes	2 episodes
2006	The Bill	Mark Holloway	Episode: "The Stranger"
2006	Doctors	Graham Griffiths	2 episodes
2007	Blue Murder	Dr. Donald Halliwell	Episode: "Desperate Measures"
2007	The Commander	John Thornton	Episode: "The Devil You Know"
2007	Sensitive Skin	Matthew Clasper	Episode: "Kiss of Life"
2008	Midsomer Murders	Guy Sandys	Episode: "Midsomer Life"
2008	Sense and Sensibility	Henry Dashwood	1 episode
2008	Spooks	Francis Denham	Episode: "On the Brink"
2009	Casualty	Professor de Silva	Episode: "My Last Day - Part 2"
2009	Kingdom	Dr. Scott-Brown	1 episode
2010	Above Suspicion	Charles Wickenham	2 episodes
2010	Merlin	Lord Godwyn	Episode: "The Changeling"
2011	Murdoch Mysteries	James Heward	Episode: "Downstairs, Upstairs"
2012	The Bletchley Circle	Cavendish	2 episodes
2012	Run for Your Wife	Cafe customer	Film
2015	Father Brown	Jerimah Moxley	Episode: "The Kembleford Boggart"
2015	The Syndicate	William Forcett	1 episode
2016	Galavant	Uncle Keith	Episode: "A New Season aka Suck It Cancellation Bear"
2016	The Rebel	Judge "Scabby" Pawson	Episode: "The Law"
2017	EastEnders	Hugo Browning	10 episodes
2017	Goodbye Christopher Robin	Zoo Director	Film
2017	Viceroy's House	Lord Wavell	Film
2019	A Ghost Story for Christmas	Stanton	Episode: "Martin's Close"
2019	Poldark	Lord Justice Kenyon	1 episode
2020	Shakespeare & Hathaway: Private Investigators	Sir Tim Forbes-Allen	Episode: "The Fury Spent"
2023	The Chelsea Detective	Maurice Swift	Episode: "Golden Years"

== Personal life ==
Williams married actress Belinda Carroll, with whom he had two children, Tam and Amy, both actors. In 1986 he married actress Lucy Fleming, the daughter of Peter Fleming and Celia Johnson and the niece of James Bond creator Ian Fleming.

Williams has served the Actors' Children's Trust and Denville Hall for more than 30 years, including 15 years as joint chairman with Angela Thorne. He has donated his time and expertise to the Sir Terence Rattigan Charitable Trust, the King George V Fund for Actors and Actresses, and several other charities.
