= A. A. Gill =

British writer and critic (1954–2016)

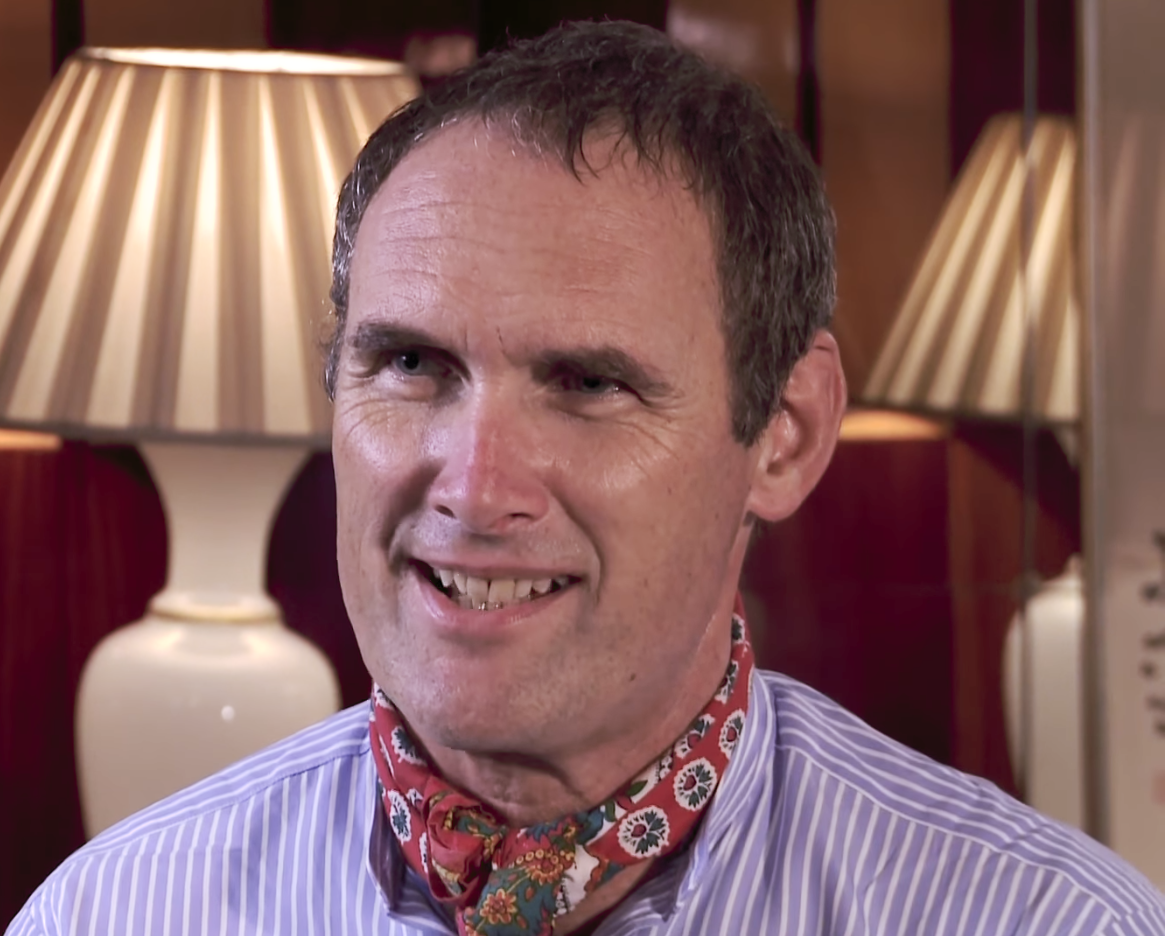
- Gill in a 2011 interview
- Born: Adrian Anthony Gill; 28 June 1954; Edinburgh, Scotland
- Died: 10 December 2016 (aged 62); Hammersmith, London, England
- Occupation: Writer
- Spouses: Cressida Connolly (m. 1982; div. 1983); Amber Rudd (m. 1990; div. 1995)
- Partner: Nicola Formby (1995–2016; his death)
- Children: 4

Adrian Anthony Gill (28 June 1954 – 10 December 2016) was a Scottish writer, best known for writing about food and travel, and for his work in television. Publications he contributed to included The Sunday Times, he wrote for Vanity Fair, GQ, and Esquire, and also published numerous books.

After failing to establish himself as an artist, Gill wrote his first piece for Tatler in 1991 and joined The Sunday Times in 1993.

Known for his sharp wit, and often controversial style, Gill was widely read and won numerous awards for his writing. On his death he was described by one editor as "a giant among journalists." His articles were the subject of numerous complaints to the Press Complaints Commission.

== Early life and education ==
Gill was born in Edinburgh to an English father, Michael Gill, a television producer and director, and a Scottish mother, Yvonne Gilan, an actress. He had a brother, Nicholas. The family moved to the south of England when he was one year old. In 1964, he appeared briefly in his parents' film The Peaches as a chess player.

Gill was educated at the independent St Christopher School, Letchworth, Hertfordshire, and later recalled his experiences at the school in his book The Angry Island. After St Christopher's, he moved to London to study at the Saint Martin's School of Art and the Slade School of Art, nurturing ambitions to be an artist. Following art school, Gill spent six years "signing on, trying to paint, until one day he realised he wasn't any good". At the age of 30, having abandoned his ambitions in art, he spent several years working in restaurants and teaching cookery.

== Writing ==
Gill began his writing career in his thirties, writing "art reviews for little magazines". His first piece for Tatler, in 1991, was an account of being in a detox clinic, written under the pseudonym Blair Baillie. In 1993, he moved to The Sunday Times where, according to Lynn Barber, "he quickly established himself as their shiniest star". He continued to write for The Sunday Times until shortly before his death in 2016.

Gill was also a contributing editor to Vanity Fair and GQ. He wrote a series of columns for GQ, on fatherhood and other subjects. He also wrote for Esquire, where he served as an agony uncle, "Uncle Dysfunctional".

Collections of his travel writing were published as AA Gill is Away (2002), Previous Convictions (2006) and AA Gill is Further Away (2011), his Tatler and Sunday Times food writing as Table Talk (2007) and his TV columns as Paper View (2008). He wrote several books on individual restaurants and their cuisine – Ivy (1997), Le Caprice (1999), Breakfast at the Wolseley (2008) and Brasserie Zedel (2016).

He also wrote two novels which were generally poorly reviewed – Sap Rising (1996) and Starcrossed (1999). Starcrossed was given the Literary Review's Bad Sex in Fiction Award. He wrote books studying England – The Angry Island (2005), and the United States – The Golden Door (2012).

In 2014, Gill won an Amnesty International Media Award, and a Women on the Move award for a series of Sunday Times Magazine articles on refugees in the Democratic Republic of the Congo, Jordan and Lampedusa. In 2014, he also won the "Hatchet Job of the Year Award" for his scathing review of Morrissey's Autobiography. In 2015 he published a memoir, Pour Me.

On his death, The Sunday Times editor Martin Ivens described Gill as "the heart and soul of the paper" and "a giant among journalists".

== Controversies ==
Gill's acerbic style led to several controversies and complaints from public figures during his career.

=== Wales ===
In 1997, in The Sunday Times, Gill described the Welsh as "loquacious dissemblers, immoral liars, stunted, bigoted, dark, ugly, pugnacious little trolls". His comments were reported to the Commission for Racial Equality and used as an example of what was described as "persistent anti-Welsh racism in the UK media" in a motion in the National Assembly for Wales. The CRE declined to prosecute, saying that Gill "had not meant to stir up racial hatred." Gill's comments led him to become the subject of the song "Little Trolls" by Welsh alternative rock band Manic Street Preachers, the B-side to their 2001 single "Ocean Spray". In the song, Manics' lyricist Nicky Wire reflects Gill's comments on the Welsh back at him, referring to him as a "Spiteful twisted unforgiven, sad and inverted and stunted, retarded ugly balding old man". Reflecting on the controversy in his 2015 memoir Pour Me, Gill said "I should have added thin-skinned."

=== Isle of Man ===
Gill's feud with the Isle of Man began in 2006 with a review of Ciappelli's restaurant in Douglas. Gill wrote that the island:

managed to slip through a crack in the space-time continuum […] fallen off the back of the history lorry to lie amnesiac in the road to progress […] its main industry is money (laundering, pressing, altering and mending) […] everyone you actually see is Benny from Crossroads or Benny in drag…. The weather's foul, the food's medieval, it's covered in suicidal motorists and folk who believe in fairies.

The review was attacked in the Tynwald, the Manx parliament, with House of Keys member David Cannan demanding an apology for the "unacceptable and scurrilous attack".

Gill made further comments regarding the Isle of Man in his Sunday Times column on 23 May 2010, when he described its citizens as falling into two types: "hopeless, inbred mouth-breathers known as Bennies" and "retired, small arms dealers and accountants who deal in rainforest futures". His comments were made in the aftermath of Mick Jagger's suggestion that drugs should be legalised in the Isle of Man. Gill added that "If ... they become a hopelessly addicted, criminal cesspit, who'd care? Indeed, who could tell the difference?"

=== England ===
In February 2011, Gill described the county of Norfolk as "the hernia on the end of England". In December 2013, his column just before New Year's Eve, was the result of a night on the beat in Grimsby and Cleethorpes and was heavily critical of both towns where Grimsby is "on the road to nowhere" and Cleethorpes is full of "hunched and grubby semi-detached homes". Humberside Police and Crime Commissioner Matthew Grove described Gill as "A tweed-suited, Mayfair-based writer, whose only experience of the North of England was his visit to Cleethorpes and his regular trips salmon fishing in Scotland".

=== Killing of a baboon ===
Gill reported in his Sunday Times column in October 2009 that he shot a baboon dead, prompting outrage from animal rights groups. "I know perfectly well there is absolutely no excuse for this", he wrote, and that he killed the animal to "get a sense of what it might be like to kill someone, a stranger". He went on to state, "They die hard, baboons. But not this one. A soft-nosed .357 blew his lungs out".

=== Clare Balding ===
In his review of Clare Balding's 2010 Britain by Bike TV programme, Gill referred to the presenter as "a big lesbian" and "a dyke on a bike". Gill's Sunday Times editor, John Witherow, responded to Balding's complaint: "In my view some members of the gay community need to stop regarding themselves as having a special victim status and behave like any other sensible group that is accepted by society. Not having a privileged status means, of course, one must accept occasionally being the butt of jokes. A person's sexuality should not give them a protected status".

Dissatisfied with the response, Balding's subsequent complaint to the Press Complaints Commission (PCC) was upheld: they considered use of the word "dyke" to have been "pejorative" and "used in a demeaning and gratuitous way". The PCC considered publication of Gill's piece to be "an editorial lapse" for which "the newspaper should have apologised at the first possible opportunity". In his defence, The Sunday Times pointed out that in the five years prior to Balding's, the PCC had received 62 complaints involving Gill but none had been upheld.

=== Mary Beard ===
Reviewing Mary Beard's BBC television series Meet the Romans in April 2012, Gill wrote that the academic "should be kept away from cameras altogether". Beard in response accused him of being "frightened of smart women" and suggested "maybe it's precisely because he did not go to university that he never quite learned the rigour of intellectual argument and he thinks that he can pass off insults as wit."

== Personal life ==
Gill had severe dyslexia and consequently dictated all of his writing.

Gill was a recovering alcoholic who stopped drinking at the age of 30. On 1 April 1984, after consuming two bottles of vintage champagne with his father on the train to Wiltshire, he checked himself into the Clouds House addiction treatment centre in East Knoyle. He followed an Alcoholics Anonymous "12-step plan" to recovery and, in tribute to the organisation, began using the name "A. A." Gill professionally. In a 2014 article in The Times, Gill said that he had "continued to smoke about 60 a day" until the age of 48."

From 1982 to 1983, Gill was married to the author Cressida Connolly. From 1990 to 1995, he was married to Amber Rudd, a financial journalist who later became Home Secretary and Secretary of State for Work and Pensions. The couple had two children. He then had a long-term relationship with Nicola Formby, editor-at-large of Tatler, for whom he left Rudd in 1995, and who appeared in his column as "The Blonde". They had twins born in 2007.

Gill was close friends with television presenter Jeremy Clarkson for some 30 years, with Clarkson describing Gill as his "closest friend". Gill appeared as a guest on Clarkson's talk show in December 1998.

Gill's younger brother Nick, a Michelin-starred chef, disappeared in 1998, telling Gill: "I'm going away now . . . I'm not coming back." Gill spoke of his sadness at not knowing what happened to Nick, and wrote that he looked for him whenever he visited a new city.

Gill described himself as a "low church Christian".

== Death ==
On 20 November 2016, Gill wrote in his Sunday Times column of his engagement to Formby, and also disclosed that he was suffering from "the full English" of cancer. In his final article in the Sunday Times Magazine, published on 11 December 2016, he disclosed that he had a primary lung tumour with metastases to his neck and pancreas, and detailed the medical treatment that he was receiving, with a commentary on his experiences as a terminal cancer patient in the National Health Service. Gill died at Charing Cross Hospital on the morning of 10 December 2016, at the age of 62.

== Bibliography ==
- Sap Rising (1996), Doubleday, ISBN 978-0-552-99679-2
- The Ivy: The Restaurant and Its Recipes (1999) with Mark Hix ISBN 978-0-340-69312-4
- Le Caprice (1999) with Mark Hix ISBN 978-0-340-73838-2
- Starcrossed (1999) ISBN 978-0552778619
- AA Gill is Away (2003) collection of travel writing. ISBN 978-0-7538-1681-3
- The Angry Island: Hunting the English (2005) a book about England and the English. ISBN 978-0-297-84318-4
- Previous Convictions: Writing with Intent (2006) assignments from here and there. ISBN 978-0-297-85162-2
- Table Talk: Sweet And Sour, Salt and Bitter (2007) Selection of Gill's writing about food, taken from his Sunday Times and Tatler columns. ISBN 978-0753824412
- Breakfast at the Wolseley (2008) ISBN 978-1-84400-444-7
- Paper View: The Best of The Sunday Times Television Columns (2008) ISBN 978-0-7538-1768-1
- AA Gill is Further Away (2011). Assorted travel writing. ISBN 978-0297863809
- The Golden Door: Letters to America (Published in the US as To America With Love) (2012) ISBN 978-0753829165
- — (31 March 2013). "Long day's journey into night". The Sunday Times.
- Pour Me (2015). Reminiscences about alcoholism. ISBN 978-0297870821
- Uncle Dysfunctional (2017). Esquire Agony Uncle advice. ISBN 978-1786891839
- Lines in the Sand (2017). Collected journalism.§ ISBN 978-1-47460515-1
- — (December 2012). "The parenting trap". Vanity Fair. 628: 110, 112.
