= Amber Rudd =

British politician (born 1963)

The Right Honourable Amber Rudd
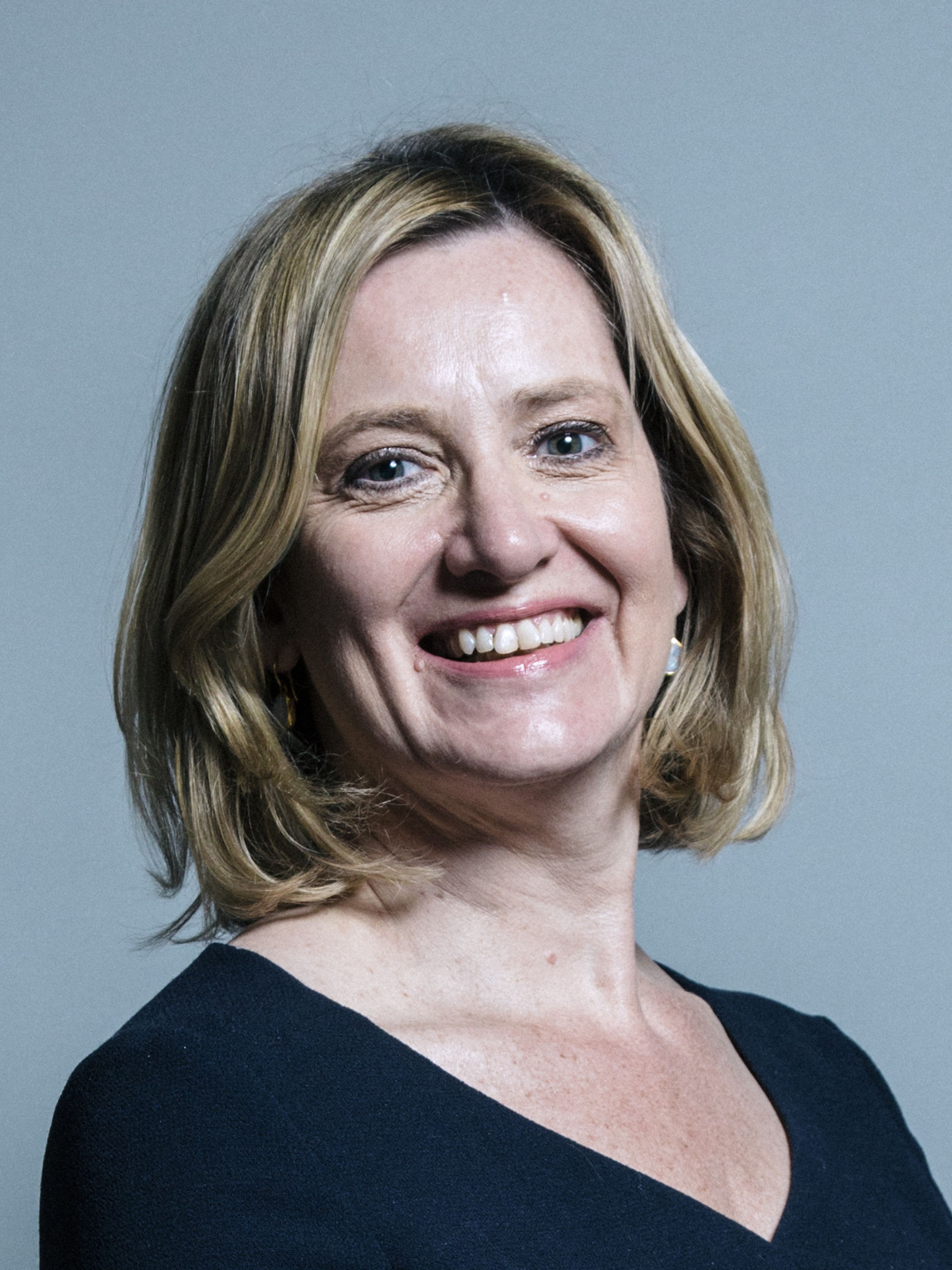
- Official portrait, 2017

Secretary of State for Work and Pensions
- In office 16 November 2018 – 7 September 2019
- Prime Minister: Theresa May; Boris Johnson
- Preceded by: Esther McVey
- Succeeded by: Thérèse Coffey

Home Secretary
- In office 13 July 2016 – 29 April 2018
- Prime Minister: Theresa May
- Preceded by: Theresa May
- Succeeded by: Sajid Javid

Secretary of State for Energy and Climate Change
- In office 11 May 2015 – 13 July 2016
- Prime Minister: David Cameron
- Preceded by: Ed Davey
- Succeeded by: Office abolished

Minister for Women and Equalities
- In office 24 July 2019 – 7 September 2019
- Prime Minister: Boris Johnson
- Preceded by: Penny Mordaunt
- Succeeded by: Liz Truss
- In office 9 January 2018 – 30 April 2018
- Prime Minister: Theresa May
- Preceded by: Justine Greening
- Succeeded by: Penny Mordaunt

Parliamentary Under-Secretary of State for Climate Change
- In office 15 July 2014 – 11 May 2015
- Prime Minister: David Cameron
- Preceded by: Greg Barker
- Succeeded by: Nick Hurd

Member of Parliament for Hastings and Rye
- In office 6 May 2010 – 6 November 2019
- Preceded by: Michael Foster
- Succeeded by: Sally-Ann Hart

Vice Chair of Prosper UK
- Incumbent
- Assumed office January 2026 Serving with David Gauke
- Chairs: Ruth Davidson; Andy Street
- Preceded by: position established

Personal details
- Born: Amber Augusta Rudd; 1 August 1963 (age 63) Marylebone, London, England
- Party: Conservative (until 2019); Independent (2019–present)
- Spouse: A. A. Gill (m. 1990; div. 1995)
- Children: 2
- Parent: Tony Rudd (father)
- Relatives: Roland Rudd (brother)
- Education: University of Edinburgh (MA)
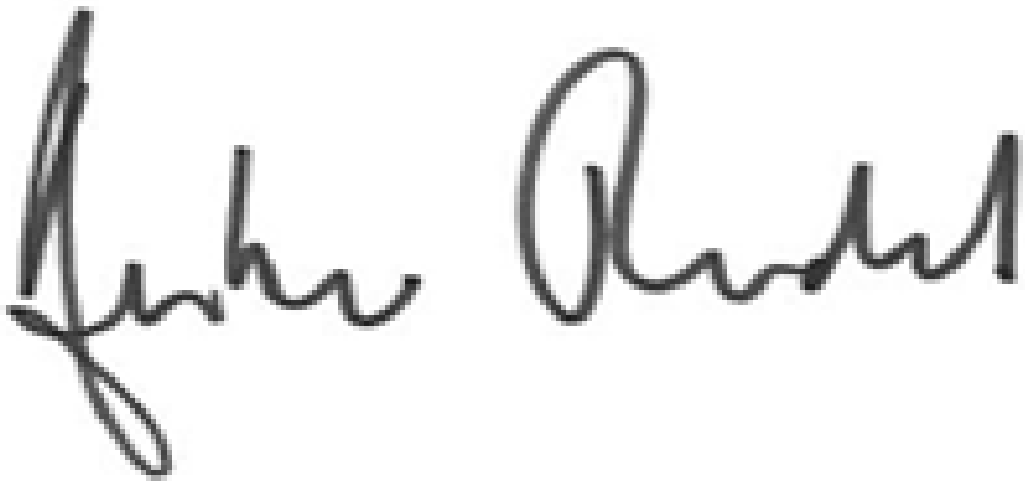
- Signature
- Website: amberrudd.co.uk

Amber Augusta Rudd (born 1 August 1963) is a British former politician who served as Home Secretary from 2016 to 2018 and Secretary of State for Work and Pensions from 2018 to 2019. She was a Member of Parliament (MP) for Hastings and Rye, first elected in 2010, representing the Conservative Party, and stood down from parliament in 2019. She identifies herself as a one-nation conservative, and has been associated with both socially liberal and economically liberal policies.

Rudd was born in Marylebone and studied history at the University of Edinburgh. Rudd worked as an investment banker before being elected to the House of Commons for Hastings and Rye in East Sussex in 2010, defeating incumbent Labour MP Michael Foster. Rudd served in the Cabinet as Secretary of State for Energy and Climate Change from 2015 to 2016 in the Cameron Government, where she worked on renewable energy resources and climate change mitigation. She previously served as Parliamentary Under-Secretary of State at the Department for Energy and Climate Change from 2014 to 2015.

She was appointed Home Secretary in the May government on 13 July 2016, and given the additional role of Minister for Women and Equalities in January 2018. Rudd was the third female home secretary, the fifth woman to hold one of the Great Offices of State and the fastest-rising politician to a Great Office of State since the Second World War (before Rishi Sunak was made the chancellor of the Exchequer in 2020). She resigned as Home Secretary in April 2018 in connection with the Windrush deportation scandal.

On 16 November 2018, Rudd was appointed Work and Pensions Secretary by Prime Minister Theresa May, succeeding Esther McVey. She was re-appointed by Boris Johnson on 24 July 2019 and succeeded Penny Mordaunt in her previous portfolio as Minister for Women and Equalities. On 7 September, Rudd resigned from his cabinet and resigned the Conservative whip in Parliament, to protest against Johnson's policy on Brexit and his decision to expel 21 Tory MPs. She announced on 30 October that she would be standing down as an MP at the next general election.

== Early life and education ==
Amber Augusta Rudd was born on 1 August 1963 in Marylebone, London, the fourth child of stockbroker Tony Rudd (1924–2017) and magistrate Ethne Fitzgerald (1929–2008), daughter of Maurice Fitzgerald QC (grandson of the judge and Liberal politician John FitzGerald, Baron FitzGerald of Kilmarnock) and Christine (daughter of American émigré Augustus Maunsell Bradhurst). Tony Rudd and Ethne Fitzgerald were married for 56 years. Through her mother, Rudd is a direct descendant of King Charles II and his mistress Barbara Palmer. Her elder brother Roland is a public relations executive, and was a prominent Labour supporter.

She was educated at New Hall School, Cheltenham Ladies' College, a private school in Gloucestershire, and from 1979 to 1981 at Queen's College, London, a private day school for girls in London, followed by the School of History, Classics and Archaeology, University of Edinburgh where she read history.

== Career ==
After graduating from university, she joined J.P. Morgan & Co., working in both London and New York.

Rudd became a director of the investment company Lawnstone Limited at the age of 24 in January 1988, taking over from her sister and brother-in-law. Lawnstone became involved with Zinc Corporation, which was taken over by Monticello in 1999, before going into liquidation in 2001.

Rudd was a co-director of Monticello between 1999 and 2000, but the company was liquidated in 2003. Craig Murray has reported that Monticello "attracted many hundreds of investors... despite never appearing actually to do anything except pay its directors. Trawling through its documents at Companies House, I find it difficult to conclude that it was ever anything other than a share ramping scheme. After just over a year of existence it went bankrupt with over £1.2 million of debts and no important assets.

Between 1998 and 2000, she was also a director of two companies based in the Bahamas, Advanced Asset Allocation Fund and Advanced Asset Allocation Management.

Rudd helped to find extras for the film Four Weddings and a Funeral (1994), for which she was credited as the "aristocracy co-ordinator", and appeared briefly in one of the church scenes in the film.

=== Parliamentary career ===
After she had stood at the 2005 general election as the Conservative candidate for the Labour-held seat of Liverpool Garston, Rudd's name was added to the Conservative A-List. Following her selection to contest the Hastings and Rye constituency in 2006, she moved to the Old Town in 2007. In the May 2010 general election, she was elected as the MP for Hastings and Rye with a majority of 1,993 votes. Shortly afterward she was elected to serve as a Conservative member on the Environment, Food and Rural Affairs Select Committee.

Rudd was vice-chair of the Parliamentary committee on female genital mutilation, which campaigned against FGM and called for tougher legal penalties in the area. She championed the cause of sex equality as chairperson of the All-party parliamentary group for Sex Equality, which published a report on women in work. Rudd chaired a cross-party enquiry into unplanned pregnancies, which called for statutory sex-and-relationships education in all secondary schools. She has also called for a higher proportion of women in Cabinet.

In September 2012, she was made Parliamentary Private Secretary to the chancellor of the Exchequer, George Osborne. In October 2013, she became an assistant government whip. In July 2014, Rudd was appointed Minister for the Department for Energy and Climate Change.

=== Secretary of State for Energy and Climate Change ===
Following the 2015 general election, where she held her seat with an increased majority, she was promoted as Secretary of State for Energy and Climate Change. In May 2015, she was appointed as a member of the Privy Council.

In March 2015, she published England's first fuel poverty strategy in more than a decade, pledging to improve the Energy Performance Certificate of all fuel poor homes to Band C by 2030. She also passed legislation requiring energy suppliers to provide a £140 discount to certain vulnerable consumers over the winter and install energy efficiency measures.

In November 2015, she proposed that the UK's remaining coal-fired power stations would be shut by 2025 with their use restricted by 2023. "We need to build a new energy infrastructure, fit for the 21st century."

In July 2015, Craig Bennett of Friends of the Earth accused Rudd of hypocrisy in claiming to want to address climate change while at the same time, in his view, "dismantling an architecture of low-carbon policies carefully put together with cross-party agreement over the course of two parliaments". Rudd replied that "[Government] support must help technologies eventually stand on their own two feet, not encourage a permanent reliance on subsidy."

Rudd participated in ITV's Brexit referendum debate regarding the European Union. She campaigned for the Remain side alongside Nicola Sturgeon and Angela Eagle. They faced Gisela Stuart, Boris Johnson and Andrea Leadsom.

=== Home Secretary ===
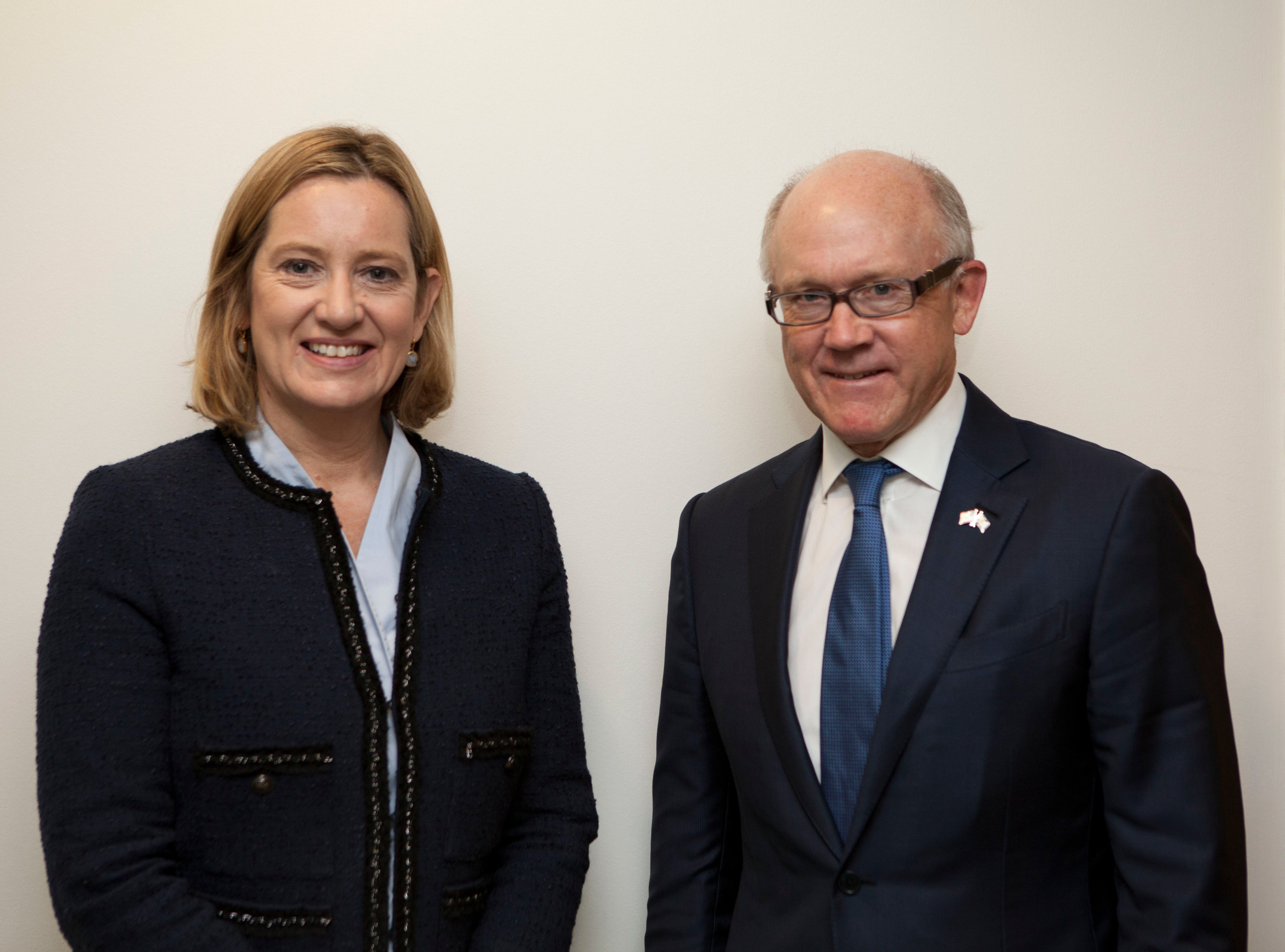
Rudd met with the US ambassador to the UK, Woody Johnson, in 2017.

When Theresa May became Prime Minister in July 2016, Rudd was appointed Home Secretary, thus becoming the fifth woman to hold one of the Great Offices of State, after Margaret Thatcher, Margaret Beckett, Jacqui Smith and May herself.

In October 2016, she negated calls for Australian citizens to obtain easier access to live and work in the United Kingdom following the UK's departure from the European Union, which were supported by British Foreign and Commonwealth Secretary Boris Johnson, and Australian foreign minister Julie Bishop. Rudd also dismissed the idea that a free movement zone between British and Australian citizens – a measure supported by former Australian prime minister Tony Abbott – would be established upon leaving the European Union, stating "there are no plans to increase immigration from Australia...so I wouldn't envisage any change".

She was reappointed as Home Secretary after the 2017 general election, in which she retained her seat at Hastings and Rye by 346 votes.

In August 2017, Rudd replied to an email hoaxer posing as the recently appointed Downing Street director of communications, Robbie Gibb, revealing that "positive announcements" were imminent. The hoaxer used Rudd's public domain parliamentary email address but she replied using her private email, which is not secure.

In September 2017 on The Andrew Marr Show, Rudd accused Foreign Secretary Boris Johnson of trying to undermine the Prime Minister, Theresa May, calling him a 'back-seat driver'. She said to Andrew Marr: "I don't want him (Boris) managing the Brexit process."

On 3 October 2017, during the Conservative Party Conference, it was reported that Rudd had hired Tory pollster Lynton Crosby to help her increase her majority in Hastings and Rye, amid speculation that she was planning to launch a bid for leadership of the party.

In November 2017, after U.S. president Donald Trump retweeted 3 anti-Muslim videos from the far right group Britain First, Rudd criticised Trump for promoting the content and argued that Britain First is a hateful organisation. Rudd further went on that relations between the U.S. and Britain are vital to the safety of both countries and have saved British lives.

On 29 April 2018, Rudd resigned as Home Secretary after misleading the Home Affairs Select Committee on deportation targets. Later in the same day, Sajid Javid was appointed as home secretary.

In September 2018, during an interview on BBC Two's Politics Live, Rudd was asked if she planned a comeback, to which she replied that she was "not without ambition".

==== Internet crackdown ====
In October 2017, Rudd announced a move by the Conservative government to crack down on what British citizens are permitted to view on the internet. Piloted as part of a campaign against "radicalisation", Rudd stated that the government would be tightening the law so that British citizens repeatedly reading certain forbidden internet content could face up to 15 years in jail for looking at the websites. Rudd stated "I want to make sure those who view despicable terrorist content online, including jihadi websites, far-right propaganda and bomb-making instructions, face the full force of the law."

==== Rise in violent crime ====
Rudd denied seeing a Home Office report saying cuts to the police force likely were a factor in rising violent crime. A section of the report states: "Since 2012–13, weighted crime demand on the police has risen, largely due to growth in recorded sex offences. At the same time officers’ numbers have fallen by 5% since 2014. So resources dedicated to serious violence have come under pressure and charge rates have dropped. This may have encouraged offenders. [It is] unlikely to be the factor that triggered the shift in serious violence, but may be an underlying driver that has allowed the rise to continue". Rudd had denied that falling police numbers contributed to increased crime. Yvette Cooper wrote, "This is shocking. Surely Home Office officials sent the document to Home Sec, to junior ministers and to special advisors? Can't imagine a department withholding from decision makers the evidence & analysis it did for a new strategy. Something has gone very wrong in Home Office".

=== Secretary of State for Work and Pensions ===
On 16 November 2018, Rudd returned to the Cabinet as Secretary of State for Work and Pensions following the resignation of Esther McVey over opposition to Theresa May's Draft Withdrawal Agreement and the Brexit negotiations.

Following the resignation of Sarah Newton, Rudd took on Newton's responsibilities as Minister for Disabled People.

=== Brexit ===
Ahead of the 2016 Brexit referendum, Rudd supported the UK remaining in the EU. From late 2018, Rudd said that a second referendum over Brexit might be appropriate. Rudd said, 'Parliament has to reach a majority on how it's going to leave the European Union. If it fails to do so, then I can see the argument for taking it back to the people again, much as it would distress many of my colleagues.'

While in then Prime Minister Theresa May's cabinet, Rudd opposed no-deal Brexit commenting in March 2019 that it could cause 'generational damage' to the economy. However she withdrew her opposition to no-deal Brexit to retain her cabinet position in Prime Minister Boris Johnson's cabinet in July of that year. In June, Rudd described the prorogation of parliament in order to deliver Brexit as a 'ridiculous suggestion', and that it was 'outrageous to consider proroguing Parliament. We're not Stuart kings'.

On 7 September 2019, Rudd resigned from the cabinet and surrendered the Conservative whip (became an independent MP). She cited her reason for resigning as she felt that the government's main objective was a no-deal Brexit over leaving with a deal.

=== Local issues ===
Rudd has been involved in the campaign for the Hastings fishing fleet. Her maiden speech advocated wholesale reform of the Common Fisheries Policy (CFP).

Rudd campaigned successfully for the construction of the Hastings to Bexhill Link Road. In early 2013, the government gave the road the go-ahead for construction after ten years of campaigning. Rudd is now spearheading a campaign called Complete The Link to see the final stage of the road get funding for construction. She has supported electrification of the Marshlink Line from Hastings to Ashford International, organising transport decision-makers for a series of rail summits. The line remains unbuilt as of December 2020, but if constructed would extend High Speed 1 into a high speed rail link from the constituency to Central London.

In April 2013, a profile of Rudd that appeared in the Financial Times reported her referring to "people who are on benefits, who prefer to be on benefits by the seaside... moving down here to have easier access to friends and drugs and drink." She responded by stating that "I am incredibly optimistic about Hastings. I described the well-known problems that Hastings has to the Financial Times but I also talked about the incredible investment in the town, the fact that unemployment is going down and that there are many positive things to say about it."

=== Standing down as MP ===
On 7 September 2019, Rudd confirmed that she would not be standing in Hastings and Rye because she did not want to divide loyalties in her constituency. However, she openly considered the possibility of standing in a London constituency, with Kensington, Putney and Chelsea and Fulham touted as possible seats. On 30 October 2019, Rudd announced in the Evening Standard that she was not going to contest the upcoming general election even though Prime Minister Boris Johnson had asked her to stand again as a Conservative candidate, although Downing Street denied this. However, she added that she was "not finished with politics", opening the door to a possible return to Parliament. In 2019, Rudd endorsed and campaigned for former Justice Secretary David Gauke who was standing as an independent in South West Hertfordshire against the Conservative candidate. However, she supported the election of Conservative candidates and endorsed the party nationally.

== Political controversies ==
=== Windrush scandal ===
In April 2018, it was reported that the children of immigrants of the "Windrush generation" who arrived before 1973 were being threatened with deportation by the British government if they could not prove their right to remain in the UK. However, the relevant documentation had been destroyed. Rudd apologised for the "appalling" treatment of the Windrush generation, but faced calls to resign from senior figures in the Labour Party. On 23 April 2018, Rudd announced that fees and language tests for citizenship applicants would be waived and compensation given to those affected amidst continued calls for her to resign.

Rudd first denied there were targets for the removal of immigrants. Later, she maintained that she had not known of targets. Later still, The Guardian published leaked evidence that Rudd had known about targets: "The six-page memo, passed to the Guardian, says the department has set 'a target of achieving 12,800 enforced returns in 2017–18' and indicates that 'we have exceeded our target of assisted returns'. It adds that progress has been made on a 'path towards the 10% increased performance on enforced returns, which we promised the Home Secretary earlier this year'". The revelation contradicted Rudd's public pronouncements concerning what she was aware of the targets for enforcing the removal of immigrants. The New Statesman said that the leaked memo gave, "in specific detail the targets set by the Home Office for the number of people to be removed from the United Kingdom. It suggests that Rudd misled MPs on at least one occasion. When questioned by Chair Yvette Cooper MP, she told the Home Affairs Select Committee that the Home Office had no targets for removals, then that she was unaware of these targets and that they would be scrapped. Now it emerges that she saw the relevant targets herself." Diane Abbott called for Rudd's resignation. In response, Rudd tweeted that she had not seen the memo "although it was copied to my office as many documents are", and said that she would make a further statement to the House of Commons.

On 29 April 2018, Rudd resigned as Home Secretary, stating in her letter of resignation that she had "inadvertently misled the Home Affairs Select Committee [...] on the issue of illegal immigration". In September 2018, during an interview on BBC Two's Politics Live, Rudd said that she had little choice but to resign given the "justifiable outrage" at the government's handling of the Windrush generation.

=== Failure to declare conflict of interest ===
During her time as Secretary of State for Energy and Climate Change, when she was expected to make a final decision on the construction of the Hinkley Point C nuclear power station, Rudd was criticised for not declaring a conflict of interest arising from her brother Roland's role as chairman and founder of Finsbury; his lobbying firm represented a company that had a £100 million construction contract for the power plant, and the Register of Members' Financial Interests had recently introduced a new category of "family members engaged in lobbying".

=== Orgreave ===
In October 2016, Rudd decided not to open an inquiry into the events at Orgreave during the 1984 miners' strike, saying that there was "not a sufficient basis for me to instigate either a statutory inquiry or an independent review". She failed to appear in Parliament to defend her decision, and was accused of having "cruelly misled" campaigners for justice in what they saw as her "bitter betrayal".

=== Plan to compel companies to disclose foreign workers ===
At the 2016 Conservative Party Conference, Rudd suggested that companies should be forced to disclose how many foreign workers they employ. The proposal was revealed as a key plank of a government drive to reduce net migration and encourage businesses to hire British staff. However, senior figures in the business world warned the plan would be a "complete anathema" to responsible employers, would be divisive, and would damage the British economy because foreign workers were hired to fill gaps in skills that British staff could not provide.

Labour responded by saying that the plan would "fan the flames of xenophobia and hatred in our communities" and the SNP described it as "the most disgraceful display of reactionary right-wing politics in living memory".

The plan was criticised as racist, leading Rudd to deny that she was racially prejudiced, and the plans were later dropped.

Rudd's speech was recorded by West Midlands Police as a hate incident following a complaint by the physicist Joshua Silver, but was not investigated.

=== Unlawful detention and deportation of asylum seekers ===
In August 2017, an emergency High Court hearing was held to examine Rudd's four-week delay in releasing an asylum seeker, who had been tortured in a Libyan prison, from a British detention centre. Concern was expressed that the home secretary failed to provide a satisfactory explanation for the delay in releasing the man from detention. Rudd also failed to provide a barrister for this proceeding and was instead represented by a government solicitor, a move which the presiding judge described as "inconceivable".

In September 2017, The Guardian reported that Rudd had authorised the deportation of Samim Bigzad to Kabul, in breach of an earlier ruling banning her from doing so owing to the ongoing threat to his life from the Taliban. A High Court Judge found Rudd to be in contempt of court on three counts, after she ignored orders to return him to the UK. Bigzad was later returned to London.

=== Comments about Diane Abbott ===
In a radio interview in March 2019, Amber Rudd attacked racist and misogynistic attacks against then Shadow Home Secretary Diane Abbott claiming that online abuse "definitely is worse if you're a woman, it's worst of all if you're a coloured woman" and "I know that Diane Abbott gets a huge amount of abuse, that's something we need to call out." Rudd was the target of criticism for her use of the term "coloured" instead of "woman of colour". Responding in a tweet, Abbott said the term was "an outdated, offensive and revealing choice of words". Rudd apologised for the remarks, calling it "clumsy language".

== Career after Parliament ==
Since leaving Parliament, Rudd was made a senior adviser at Teneo and an adviser to Darktrace. She is also a trustee of The Climate Group.

In March 2020, Rudd was invited to speak at the Oxford Union as part of an International Women's Day event. Shortly before Rudd was due to speak, the UNWomen Oxford society withdrew their invitation following a vote of its committee. Oxford University criticized the decision to dis-invite Rudd, tweeting that it is “committed to freedom of speech and opposes no-platforming”. Rudd called the decision “badly judged” and “rude” and encouraged students who opposed her politics to “stop hiding and start engaging”

In July 2020, she began presenting her own show, Split Opinion, on Times Radio, alongside her daughter, the journalist Flora Gill.

In August 2020, her name was given media coverage over her possible undertaking of the role of Chairman of the BBC.

In October 2021, it was announced that Rudd had departed Teneo to take up a role as a senior advisor at Finsbury Glover Hering (FGH), a strategic advisory and communications firm partly founded by her brother Roland. In 2021, FGH announced it was merging with Sard Verbinnen & Co. In 2022, the combined firm was rebranded FGS Global.

In January 2022, British energy and services multinational company Centrica appointed Rudd as a non-executive director to the board of the company; she also took a seat on the Safety, Environment & Sustainability Committee and the Remuneration Committee of the company. GMB Union National Secretary Andy Prendergast criticised her appointment while British households and companies were facing unprecedented energy bills, saying that "her business background is questionable and her role as Energy Minister is marked by forcefully pushing for the competition system which has spectacularly failed over the last six months".

According to her X account page as of August 2023, Rudd's bio states that she works "in the private sector, primarily in energy and cyber security."

In January 2026, Rudd alongside Andy Street, David Gauke and Ruth Davidson launched a movement called Prosper UK, aiming to bring the Conservative party back to the centre right.

== Personal life ==
Rudd married the writer and critic A. A. Gill in 1990 and they had two children, including the journalist Flora Gill. The couple separated in 1995, after Gill entered into a long-term relationship with journalist Nicola Formby. Gill and Rudd later divorced. Rudd was subsequently in a relationship with fellow former Conservative MP Kwasi Kwarteng.

Rudd is a trustee of the Snowdon Trust, an organisation that helps young disabled people access education. Rudd has been a director of the Susan Smith Blackburn Prize since 2003, an annual award for a first-time female playwright in the English language. She also served as a governor of The St Leonards Academy in Hastings.

Parliament of the United Kingdom
Preceded by Michael Foster	Member of Parliament for Hastings and Rye; 2010–2019	Succeeded by Sally-Ann Hart
Political offices
Preceded by Ed Davey	Secretary of State for Energy and Climate Change; 2015–2016	Succeeded by Greg Clark as Secretary of State for Business, Energy and Industrial Strategy
Preceded by Theresa May	Home Secretary; 2016–2018	Succeeded by Sajid Javid
Preceded by Justine Greening	Minister for Women and Equalities; 2018	Succeeded by Penny Mordaunt
Preceded by Esther McVey	Secretary of State for Work and Pensions; 2018–2019	Succeeded by Thérèse Coffey
