= Adam Adamant Lives! =

British television adventure series (1966–1967)

- Title card from the opening titles
- Created by: Donald Cotton; Richard Harris
- Developed by: Sydney Newman; Tony Williamson
- Starring: Gerald Harper; Juliet Harmer; Jack May; Peter Ducrow; Derek Ware; Kenneth Benda
- Theme music composer: Hal Shaper; David Lee
- Opening theme: "The Adam Adamant Theme" by Kathy Kirby
- Country of origin: United Kingdom
- No. of series: 2
- No. of episodes: 29 (12 missing)

Production
- Producer: Verity Lambert
- Running time: 50 mins

Original release
- Network: BBC1
- Release: 23 June 1966 – 25 March 1967

Adam Adamant Lives! is a British adventure television series that ran from 1966 to 1967 on BBC1, starring Gerald Harper in the title role. The series was created and produced by several alumni from Doctor Who. The titular character was an adventurer born in 1867, who had been revived from hibernation in 1966, thus offering a satirical look at life in the 1960s through the eyes of a Victorian. In 2020, Big Finish Productions reimagined the series as a Radio drama.

== Premise ==
The main character originally went through a number of possible names: "Cornelius Chance", "Rupert De'Ath", "Dick Daring", "Dexter Noble", "Aurelian Winton", "Magnus Hawke" and even "Darius Crud" before Sydney Newman settled on Adam Adamant, named after the generic mineral term adamantine which, since the Middle Ages, has commonly referred to diamond. In the opening episode, "A Vintage Year for Scoundrels", Adam Llewellyn De Vere Adamant is a swashbuckling Edwardian gentleman adventurer who, in 1902 (when Edward VII had been on the throne just one year), goes to rescue his kidnapped girlfriend Louise. In fact, he is lured into a trap, whereupon he is captured and condemned to be frozen forever in a block of ice by his nemesis, the Face, whose identity is concealed behind a leather mask and who speaks in a sinister whispering voice. The Face grants him one last request, and Adamant asks to see Louise; in his last moments of life before being frozen, he learns to his horror that Louise had faked her kidnapping and had been working for the Face all along.

Adamant is found in 1966, when a building is being knocked down, and he is revived. On emerging from a hospital and collapsing on the London streets, he is rescued by Georgina Jones and taken to her flat. Adamant immediately became embroiled in the criminal world of the 1960s when Georgina is threatened after almost being witness to the murder of her grandfather by protection racketeers at a disco. Though in many ways a typical swinging sixties woman, Georgina had grown up idolising Adamant through tales of his turn-of-the-century exploits. She tries to get involved with all his cases, despite his efforts to stop her, and often manages to get a job at the scene in question at a moment's notice. The part was played by Ann Holloway in the untransmitted pilot episode, but was recast with Juliet Harmer as it was felt that Holloway's performance did not fit the series. During the second episode, "Death Has a Thousand Faces", the events of which are set in Blackpool, he acquires a manservant in the form of former music hall artiste and Punch and Judy man William E. Simms. The character was originally to have been played by John Dawson, who hurt his back lifting an actress during rehearsals for "The Sweet Smell of Disaster" and was unable to continue. The part was recast, going instead to Jack May.

Adamant is an expert swordsman, carrying a swordstick with which he cold-bloodedly kills any enemy who deserves it. John Steed of The Avengers and Lord Peter Wimsey used similar weapons. Adamant was a colonel, and a member of the volunteer strength of the 51st Yeomanry since 1895, though he is listed on their official records as being "missing, presumed killed" since 1902. He is also a good boxer, and occasionally demonstrates proficiency in jujitsu, which had been introduced to England several years before he was frozen.

Though there is no indication of where his money comes from or how he supports himself, Adamant rebuilt his old home, the long demolished 26A Albany Street, on the top of a multi-storey car park which he had bought at 17 Upper Thames Street in central London. It is accessed by a lift hidden on the other side of a sliding wall, activated from the outside by pressing a hidden call button. He also purchased a Mini Cooper S with the personalised number plate AA 1000. The car was a special conversion: a "Mini de Ville" by Harold Radford Coach Builder LTD. He occasionally does jobs for the British Government, as in "More Deadly Than the Sword". When he is knocked unconscious, Adamant often dreams of how he was caught by the Face and Louise. He continues to be taken advantage of by women in the 1960s, owing to his out-of-time naïveté.

The Face returned to the show in the second series, beginning with the episode "A Slight Case of Reincarnation". He joins Adamant in the present day, having also been frozen in 1902. His accomplice Louise aged naturally, watching over him during the intervening years, before reviving him. Throughout the second series The Face would assist Adamant's antagonists, but routinely escaped before facing defeat himself. In the final episode, Adamant celebrates his 100th birthday in the final episode, "A Sinister Sort of Service", receiving a telegram from the Queen.

== Production ==
=== Series development ===
Adam Adamant Lives! has been called by modern observers "what Doctor Who did next", because at least three Doctor Who alumni had key positions on the pilot. It reunited producer Verity Lambert with Head of Television Drama Sydney Newman. Together they had been at the core of decision-makers who launched Doctor Who. The series also brought Donald Cotton, who had the same year written two serials for Doctor Who, back into Newman's orbit. Cotton and partner Richard Harris would write the first script, "A Vintage Year for Scoundrels", and would therefore come to be credited as co-creators. However, over the years, Newman has been cited as creator of the show. Even the BBC has at times propagated this idea, calling him the creator on some of their own pages devoted to the programme, but not on others.

Adam Adamant Lives! was a quick replacement for the show he had actually intended, an adaptation of the adventures of literary detective Sexton Blake. When the rights to the character suddenly became unavailable, it fell to writers Cotton and Harris, along with script editor Tony Williamson, to come up with an alternative idea. Newman indicated near the end of his life that he had, indeed, been significantly involved in the rewrites, suggesting that his critic Mary Whitehouse had been partial inspiration for the character. Many of the indoor scenes were filmed at Studios 3 and 5 at the BBC Television Centre in London.

=== Filming ===
Gerald Harper chose to wear false eyebrows when playing the title role, based on those of his make-up artist. He also wore a wig. Harper was shortsighted and wore glasses, which he removed as soon as filming was ready to start. When the series ended, the make-up woman sewed his fake eyebrows onto a sampler, with "Here lie the Eyebrows of Adam Adamant, 1966–1967" underneath, which was framed and given to Harper as a memento. He also kept his character's swordstick, and both remain on the wall at home.

=== Cancellation ===
Television critic Paul Stump opines in the BBC Four documentary The Cult of Adam Adamant! that the programme ended because the contemporaneously airing The Avengers was a "sexier, slicker, better-funded" version of the same concept. Gerald Harper went on to appear in Yorkshire Television's Gazette and its sequel Hadleigh.

== Episodes ==
The untransmitted pilot episode, "Adam Adamant Lives", no longer exists in the BBC Archives. All of series one, with the exception of "Ticket to Terror", is held by the BBC. Series two has not fared so well, with only "Black Echo" and "A Sinister Sort of Service" remaining in existence.

=== Pilot episode - Adam Adamant ===
No. overall	No. in season	Title	Directed by	Written by	Original release date
0	0	"Adam Adamant Lives"	William Slater	Donald Cotton & Richard Harris	N/A
Edwardian adventurer and gentleman Adam Adamant pursues his opponent known as The Face to an abandoned mansion. Once there he is trapped and frozen into an everlasting death. Awakened in 1966, he is befriended by young Georgina Jones. Also still alive, the Face abducts the Home Secretary, planning to exchange him for Adamant. 1902 sequence reused in "A Vintage Year for Scoundrels."

=== Series 1 (1966) ===
No. overall	No. in season	Title	Directed by	Written by	Original release date
1	1	"A Vintage Year for Scoundrels"	David Sullivan Proudfoot & William Slater	Tony Williamson; Additional Material by Donald Cotton & Richard Harris	23 June 1966
Edwardian adventurer and gentleman Adam Adamant pursues his opponent known as The Face to an abandoned mansion. Once there he is trapped and frozen into an everlasting death. Awakened in 1966, he is befriended by young Georgina Jones. When Georgina's boss is murdered, Adam is plunged into battle with the vicious protection racketeers responsible.
2	2	"Death Has a Thousand Faces"	Philip Dudley	Tony Williamson	30 June 1966
When a man is stabbed to death for a stick of Blackpool rock, Adamant and Jones discover a mysterious piece of paper and they journey to Blackpool. Once there they make the acquaintance of Simms, a Punch and Judy puppeteer, who joins them in their hunt.
3	3	"More Deadly Than the Sword"	Leonard Lewis	Terence Frisby	7 July 1966
Adam and Georgina (minus Simms) journey to Japan in order to help a British politician when he becomes blackmailed by terrorists.
4	4	"The Sweet Smell of Disaster"	Philip Dudley	Robert Banks Stewart	14 July 1966
Adam finds himself battling against his own friends when a carnation starts to cause chaos.
5	5	"Allah Is Not Always With You"	Paul Ciappessoni	Tony Williamson	21 July 1966
Adam is plunged into the world of nightclubs, drugs and murder while investigating the death of a young girl who has connections with an Arabic prince.
6	6	"The Terribly Happy Embalmers"	Paul Ciappessoni	Brian Clemens	4 August 1966
The murder of a financier leads Adam into the world of embalmers, but his own fate is catching up with him.
7	7	"To Set a Deadly Fashion"	Leonard Lewis	Tony Williamson	11 August 1966
Adam gets in the way of a murder plot when he enters the world of fashion.
8	8	"The Last Sacrifice"	Philip Dudley	Richard Harris	18 August 1966
A weekend in the countryside turns into a race to stop a magician who is holding humanity to ransom.
9	9	"Sing a Song of Murder"	Moira Armstrong	John Pennington	25 August 1966
Adam's past catches up with him when his friends are accused of murder. Can he prove their innocence before his world crashes around him?
10	10	"The Doomsday Plan"	Paul Ciappessoni	Richard Harris	1 September 1966
Adam is led to 'Doctor' Mort, a so-called prophet, who predicts the world will end.
11	11	"Death by Appointment Only"	Moira Armstrong	Tony Williamson	8 September 1966
A series of murders could signal the end of the world.
12	12	"Beauty Is an Ugly Word"	Philip Dudley	Vince Powell & Harry Driver	15 September 1966
Adam enters the world of glamour while trying to stop another attempt to end the world.
13	13	"The League of Uncharitable Ladies"	Ridley Scott	John Pennington	22 September 1966
A murder leads Adam to three sinister old ladies. Can he discover their secret before all hell breaks loose?
14	14	"Ticket to Terror"	Tina Wakerell	Dick Sharples	29 September 1966
Adam investigates when 400 passengers disappear from a Waterloo & City line train.
15	15	"The Village of Evil"	Anthea-Browne Wilkinson	Vince Powell & Harry Driver	6 October 1966
Adam, Georgina and Simms go for a peaceful fishing trip, but a case involving a young boy's missing pet mice and the practice of satanic rites land him in another investigation.
16	16	"D for Destruction"	Moira Armstrong	Tony Williamson	13 October 1966
A series of 'accidental deaths' lead 'Colonel' Adam Adamant back into his old regiment. Once there, he learns of a plan to hijack Great Britain's nuclear missiles.

=== Series 2: 1966–67 ===
No. overall	No. in season	Title	Directed by	Written by	Original release date
17	1	"A Slight Case of Reincarnation"	Roger Jenkins	Tony Williamson and Brian Clemens (Story)	31 December 1966
A determined attempt to assassinate a visiting African leader causes a Government Minister to call on the services of Adam Adamant.*
18	2	"Black Echo"	Moira Armstrong	Derek Ford & Donald Ford	7 January 1967
Adam visits an exiled Russian Grand Duchess to prove her legitimacy. However, upon arrival at the Duchess's home, Adam finds two horrifying secrets from his past are about to return...
19	3	"Conspiracy of Death"	Roger Jenkins	Vince Powell & Harry Driver	14 January 1967
Jankers Johnson, a wartime comrade of Simms, is mysteriously murdered at their old R.A.F. aerodrome: but before he dies he gets a message to Adam.
20	4	"The Basardi Affair"	Henri Safran	Ian Stuart Black	21 January 1967
Adam gets on the wrong side of the ruler of an oil-rich country.**
21	5	"The Survivors"	Moira Armstrong	Vince Powell & Harry Driver	28 January 1967
When a number of inventions are brought on to the market after the death of their inventors Adam Adamant is involved in a sinister plot.
22	6	"Face in a Mirror"	Henri Safran	John Pennington	4 February 1967
The Face returns, determined to rid the world of Adam Adamant once and for all.
23	7	"Another Little Drink"	Laurence Bourne	Ian Stuart Black	11 February 1967
When Georgina goes to a party organised by the manufacturers of a new soft drink, she finds the drink is not as innocuous as it appears.
24	8	"Death Begins at Seventy"	Ridley Scott	Dick Sharples	18 February 1967
When Simms gets a message from an old friend from theatre days, both Simms and Adam find themselves mixed up in a curious affair at an old people's home.
25	9	"Tunnel of Death"	Moira Armstrong	Richard Waring	25 February 1967
The Face's new plans threaten to tear the world to pieces.
26	10	"The Deadly Bullet"	Henri Safran	Vince Powell & Harry Driver	4 March 1967
The Great Manton is killed while performing the bullet trick. Adam, using his powers of deduction, helps a reluctant policeman to find the murderer.
27	11	"The Resurrectionists"	Ridley Scott	Derek Ford & Donald Ford	11 March 1967
When a scientist destroys his invention for calming naturally fierce animals and then vanishes, Adam is involved in a sinister encounter with the agents of the Face.
28	12	"Wish You Were Here"	Moira Armstrong	James MacTaggart	18 March 1967
When Simms's mother is charged with disturbing the peace Simms goes to help her and stumbles on to a sordid plot.
29	13	"A Sinister Sort of Service"	Laurence Bourne	Tony Williamson	25 March 1967
A series of nation-wide robberies plunge Adam, Georgina and Simms into the hands of a deadly group of security guards...

* Approximately four minutes from this episode exist on audio tape in a private collection, and is included as part of the Special Features on the DVD release.
** This episode currently exists only as an off-air audio recording.

=== Lost episodes ===
There were originally 29 black-and-white episodes composing two series, plus one unbroadcast pilot titled Adam Adamant Lives (without exclamation mark, as here). The 1902 sequence is now all that is known to survive of this unseen debut episode of the series, and only exists because it was later reused in "A Vintage Year for Scoundrels". No script of Adam Adamant Lives is known to exist, and the only documentation that remains is the description given in the Drama Early Warning Synopsis issued on Thursday 10 March 1966; this is included in the booklet Adam Adamant Lives!: Viewing Notes accompanying the DVD boxed set Adam Adamant Lives!: The Complete Collection released by 2entertain Ltd in July 2006.

The first series, with the exception of "Ticket to Terror", was made as a mixture of single camera 16 mm film for the location sequences, and multi-camera studio recording using 625-line electronic cameras. Instead of being edited on video tape, as was the usual BBC procedure, the series was edited on film, with the output of the studio cameras being telerecorded, for ease of editing. (At that time, videotape editing was difficult.)

"Ticket to Terror" from the first series, and all of the second series, were made with the usual BBC mix of tape and film, but were edited on tape. Wiping by the BBC in the 1970s has resulted in no master videotapes having survived. Film recordings haven't all survived either as, in one case, one episode on 35 mm film is known to have been destroyed.

Only 16 episodes remained in the archives when the BBC realised the value of such material, including the first and last episodes in broadcast order. These were mainly in the form of 35 mm film telerecordings, with a handful of episodes as 16 mm film recordings or reduction prints. In the case of some episodes, the 35 mm location footage also exists and has been used to remaster those surviving episodes. The last episode of Series One, "D For Destruction", thought to be among those lost forever, was recovered in 2003, from a mislabelled film can in the BBC Archives. It has been shown in public at the Missing Believed Wiped event, and is included in the Complete Collection DVD set.

Another lost episode, "The Basardi Affair", was recovered as a complete off-air audio recording in 2017, and remains to date the only missing Adam Adamant Lives! episode known to exist in this format. A public appeal campaign, the BBC Archive Treasure Hunt, continues to search for missing episodes.

==== List of lost episodes ====
Series	Episode No.	Lost Episodes	Original Broadcast Date
0	Pilot	Adam Adamant Lives	Not broadcast
1	14	Ticket To Terror	29 September 1966
2	1	A Slight Case of Reincarnation	31 December 1966
2	3	Conspiracy of Death	14 January 1967
2	4	The Basardi Affair*	21 January 1967
2	5	The Survivors	28 January 1967
2	6	Face in a Mirror	4 February 1967
2	7	Another Little Drink	11 February 1967
2	8	Death Begins at Seventy	18 February 1967
2	9	Tunnel of Death	25 February 1967
2	10	The Deadly Bullet	4 March 1967
2	11	The Resurrectionists	11 March 1967
2	12	Wish You Were Here	18 March 1967

* This episode currently exists only in audio form.

== Home media ==
=== VHS ===
Adam Adamant Lives!

- Label: BBC Video
- Release Date: 6 May 1991
- Catalogue Nº: BBCV 4613
- Availability: Deleted

Contains the first two episodes of Series One, "A Vintage Year for Scoundrels" and "Death Has a Thousand Faces", the latter replacing the previously considered "The Village of Evil". Although there were rumours of two further releases towards the end of 1991, these did not appear owing to poor sales. Re-issued on DVD by Revelation in 2001.

=== DVD ===
Adam Adamant Lives!: The Complete Collection

- Label: 2entertain Ltd.
- Release Date: 26 July 2006
- Catalogue Nº: BBCDVD 1479
- Availability: Deleted (unconfirmed)

Five-disc Region 2 DVD box set containing all 17 surviving episodes in digitally re-mastered form. Includes 64-page collector's booklet Adam Adamant Lives!: Viewing Notes, written by Andrew Pixley.

==== Special Features ====
- This Man is the One: 52-minute documentary featuring Gerald Harper, Juliet Harmer, Verity Lambert and Brian Clemens. Presented by Mark Gatiss.
- Commentary Tracks: Available on "A Vintage Year for Scoundrels" and "A Sinister Sort of Service". Featuring Gerald Harper, Juliet Harmer and Verity Lambert.
- Adam Adamant's Wheels: 7-minute mini-documentary on Adam Adamant's faithful Mini Cooper S.
- Missing Sounds: Audio extract from missing Series Two episode "A Slight Case of Reincarnation".
- Outtakes: Filming and studio outtakes from "A Vintage Year for Scoundrels" and "Sing a Song of Murder".
- Photo Gallery: 13-minute photo gallery featuring colour and black and white pictures from the series, plus stills from the unbroadcast pilot episode, accompanied by music from the series – including the full version of "The Adam Adamant Theme" performed by Kathy Kirby.
- PDFs: (DVD-Rom only. PC/Mac)

– Radio Times articles
– Full scripts for the 12 missing broadcast episodes
– The Adam Adamant Annual
– TV Comic, TV Comic Holiday Special and TV Comic Annual comic strip stories

Note: On both the VHS and DVD releases, "A Vintage Year for Scoundrels" and "Death Has a Thousand Faces" have had music edits made due to the originally featured tracks by the Rolling Stones not being able to be cleared for commercial release. For the former, "Route 66" was replaced by "Piano Rocket" from the Parry Music Library CD Time Periods 1, while the latter featured "Bye Bye Blues" from the KOK Library CD Pop Era in place of "Now I've Got a Witness" .

== Influences and legacy ==
=== The Avengers ===
With its pairing of an upper-class adventurer with a "trendy" woman of the 1960s, parallels have been drawn with competitor ITV's The Avengers. There was also a similarity with Granada's Mr. Rose (1967) in which William Mervyn as a retired police inspector was assisted by a youngish confidential secretary (Gillian Lewis) and a manservant (Donald Webster). However, because Adam Adamant was a last-minute replacement for another concept, the degree to which the BBC intended such similarities with The Avengers is unclear. Lambert directly addressed the issue: "In Adam Adamant Lives, we were trying to create something original. Even though it may have been aimed at a similar audience to The Avengers – any production decisions we made were not influenced by trying to imitate".

However, a reviewer of the 2006 BBC Four retrospective The Cult of ... Adam Adamant Lives! detected something more to the issue when Lambert and other principals were interviewed on camera:

The genial and personable Harmer, Clemens, Harper and producer Verity Lambert all owned up to the clunking obviousness of the series' hamfisted and, in retrospect, laughable attempt to trump ABC's masterpiece. Even an otherwise impartial and unironic script compared the two shows thus: "Edwardian gent teamed with beautiful girl ... and Edwardian gent teamed with beautiful girl". The unspoken tag, of course, was that The Avengers had queered this pitch three years previously.

— Paul Stump, Off the Telly review of The Cult of ... Adam Adamant Lives!, 2006

Anthony Clark at the British Film Institute|(BFI) noted that while the show "owes a stylistic debt to The Avengers", it was "the BBC's reply to the success of ITV's spy and action series like The Saint (1962–69) and Danger Man (1960–69)". He goes on to call the character of Adamant "more age-of-empire adventurer than spoof spy". A Television Heaven review said that while the programme has been "long cited as the BBC's answer to The Avengers", it in fact "owes more to the slick style, tone and format of Lew Grade's phenomenally successful ITC stable of action series rather than the sleek and sophisticated antics of Steed and Mrs Peel".

=== Doctor Who ===
Harper's portrayal of Adamant has been cited as formative to Jon Pertwee's interpretation of the Doctor. The BBC's episode guide to Doctor Who claims parallels between the Third Doctor's inaugural scenes in a hospital with those of Adamant in his pilot, "A Vintage Year for Scoundrels".

=== Austin Powers ===
"Adamant" is frequently viewed as partial inspiration for Austin Powers: International Man of Mystery. In particular, allusions are seen between the way in which Austin Powers, like Adamant, is revived from cryogenic sleep and befriended by an attractive woman who had known of his exploits before being frozen. The formula is exactly reversed in Powers, however, in that his partner, Vanessa Kensington, is not impressed with his previous record of service, whereas Georgina Jones is a positive fan of Adamant.

== Big Finish audio series ==
Audio drama production company Big Finish Productions announced that they would be producing a new series of audio plays, written by and co-starring actor-novelist Guy Adams as Simms. Nicholas Briggs directed. Blake Ritson took over the title role, and Milly Thomas played Georgina. The first volume, "A Vintage Year for Scoundrels", was released in January 2020. A second volume, "Face Off" was released in August 2020.

=== Volume 1: A Vintage Year for Scoundrels ===
No.	Title	Directed by	Written by	Released
1	"What Is This Place?"	Nicholas Briggs	Guy Adams	January 2020
2	"Death Has A Thousand Faces"	Nicholas Briggs	Guy Adams	January 2020
3	"Georgina Jones Dies!"	Nicholas Briggs	Guy Adams	January 2020

=== Volume 2: Face Off ===
No.	Title	Directed by	Written by	Released
1	"A Slight Case Of Reincarnation"	Nicholas Briggs	Guy Adams	August 2020
2	"Face It!"	Nicholas Briggs	Guy Adams	August 2020
3	"The Important Questions"	Nicholas Briggs	Guy Adams	August 2020
