= Counter-Measures =

Big Finish series based on Remembrance of the Daleks

Counter-Measures / The New Counter-Measures

Big Finish Productions audio drama
- Series: The Worlds of Doctor Who
- Written by: Ken Bentley; John Dorney; Matt Fitton; Christopher Hatherall; Roland Moore; Ian Potter; Justin Richards; Mark Wright
- Directed by: Ken Bentley
- Produced by: David Richardson
- Executive producers: Jason Haigh-Ellery; Nicholas Briggs
- Starring: Simon Williams; Pamela Salem; Karen Gledhill; Hugh Ross
- Music: Nicholas Briggs
- Release date: Counter-Measures; July 2012 – July 2015; The New Counter-Measures; July 2016 – present

Counter-Measures and The New Counter-Measures are Big Finish Productions audio play series based on the television series Doctor Who. Continuing the story of several characters from the serial Remembrance of the Daleks (1988), the British government establishes a new organization called Counter-Measures to investigate reports of advanced technology, the supernatural and alien sightings.

== Cast ==
- Simon Williams as Ian Gilmore – The Counter-Measures' group captain and a Royal Air Force officer, he served as the first leader of the Intrusion Counter-Measures Group.
- Pamela Salem as Rachel Jensen – A professor and the scientific adviser for Gilmore, who becomes the head of Counter-Measures after him.
- Karen Gledhill as Allison Williams – Jensen's research assistant in 1963.
- Hugh Ross as Toby Kinsella – A British civil servant who oversaw the original Intrusion Countermeasures Group.

== Production ==
Counter-Measures was initially announced in April 2012, and set for release the following July. The series was announced to reunite the cast of Remembrance of the Daleks (1988), including Simon Williams as Captain Gilmore, Pamela Salem as Rachel Jensen and Karen Gledhill as Allison, as well as the inclusion of Hugh Ross as Toby Kinsella. Alastair Mackenzie was also included as Allison's boyfriend Julian. The series was announced to be continuing by Doctor Who Magazine and writer Cavan Scott in December 2012.

The New Counter-Measures was developed after the initial Counter-Measures range concluded, and was planned to be a "transitional period" for the titular group, combining the story of Remembrance of the Daleks with the creation of the United Nations Intelligence Taskforce. The series was initially released as two specials in July 2016, followed by a full series the following December, with the full cast of the original series returning. The New Counter-Measures was initially announced as concluded in February 2019; however, two further specials were announced in August 2019, set for release in April and May 2020.

== Reception ==
Games Radar reviewed the first series of Counter-Measures, commenting on the series' "political reality" and the original episode's "lack of rose-tinted nostalgia". The leads were praised on how they were able to reprise their roles from the television series, though the level of unevenness was commented on, on how some episodes featured over-used sound effects and plots of other episodes were "far-fetched"; however, the series overall was rated positively as a promising start. Starburst Magazine awarded the second series 8 out of 10, approving the move from the technology that was focused on in the first series to the character-led development of the second series, especially Sir Toby.

Steve Mollmann of Unreality SF reviewed the third season, and commented on how he was initially disappointed by the finale of the second series and its lead-in to the third series. Mollmann's best reviewed story was Unto the Breach, with compliments to the Cold War storyline and Hugh Ross's acting as Sir Toby. Overall, he reviewed the third series as "not Counter-Measures at its best", but that the ending of the series "promises Series 4 to be a return to form".

== Episodes ==
=== Counter-Measures ===
==== Series 1 (2012) ====
No.	Title	Directed by	Written by	Featuring	Released
1	"Threshold"	Ken Bentley	Paul Finch	–	July 2012
2	"Artificial Intelligence"	Ken Bentley	Matt Fitton	Julian St Stephen, Broderick	July 2012
3	"The Pelage Project"	Ken Bentley	Ian Potter	–	July 2012
4	"State of Emergency"	Ken Bentley	Justin Richards	Julian St Stephen	July 2012

==== Series 2 (2013) ====
No.	Title	Directed by	Written by	Featuring	Released
1	"Manhunt"	Ken Bentley	Matt Fitton	Emma, Templeton, West	July 2013
2	"The Fifth Citadel"	Ken Bentley	James Goss	Templeton	July 2013
3	"Peshka"	Ken Bentley	Cavan Scott & Mark Wright	Shurik	July 2013
4	"Sins of the Fathers"	Ken Bentley	John Dorney	Emma, Templeton	July 2013

==== Series 3 (2014) ====
No.	Title	Directed by	Written by	Featuring	Released
1	"Changing of the Guard"	Ken Bentley	Matt Fitton	Templeton, Heaton	July 2014
2	"The Concrete Cage"	Ken Bentley	Justin Richards	–	July 2014
3	"The Forgotten Village"	Ken Bentley	Ken Bentley	–	July 2014
4	"Unto the Breach"	Ken Bentley	John Dorney	Templeton	July 2014

==== Series 4 (2015) ====
No.	Title	Directed by	Written by	Featuring	Released
1	"New Horizons"	Ken Bentley	Mark Wright	Templeton, Captain	July 2015
2	"The Keep"	Ken Bentley	Ken Bentley	Templeton, Heaton, Captain, West, Broderick, Shurik	July 2015
3	"Rise and Shine"	Ken Bentley	John Dorney	Templeton, Heaton	July 2015
4	"Clean Sweep"	Ken Bentley	Matt Fitton	Heaton	July 2015

=== The New Counter-Measures ===
==== Specials (2016) ====
No.	Title	Directed by	Written by	Featuring	Released
1	"Who Killed Toby Kinsella?"	Ken Bentley	John Dorney	Mikhail	July 2016
2	"The Dead Don't Rise"	Ken Bentley	Ken Bentley	Mikhail	July 2016

==== Series 1 (2016) ====
No.	Title	Directed by	Written by	Featuring	Released
1	"Nothing to See Here"	Ken Bentley	Guy Adams	–	December 2016
2	"Troubled Waters"	Ken Bentley	Ian Potter	–	December 2016
3	"The Phoenix Strain"	Ken Bentley	Christopher Hatherall	–	December 2016
4	"A Gamble with Time"	Ken Bentley	John Dorney	Suzanne Clare	December 2016

==== Series 2 (2017) ====
No.	Title	Directed by	Written by	Featuring	Released
1	"The Splintered Man"	Ken Bentley	Roland Moore	–	December 2017
2	"The Ship of the Sleepwalkers"	Ken Bentley	Christopher Hatherall	–	December 2017
3	"My Enemy's Enemy"	Ken Bentley	Robert Khan and Tom Salinsky	Suzanne Clare	December 2017
4	"Time of the Intelligence"	Ken Bentley	Andy Frankham-Allen	Edward Travers, Great Intelligence	December 2017

==== Series 3 (2019–20) ====
No.	Title	Directed by	Written by	Featuring	Released
1	"The Hollow King"	Ken Bentley	Ian Potter	–	January 2019
2	"The Movellan Manoeuvre"	Ken Bentley	John Dorney	Suzanne Clare, Movellans	April 2020
3	"The Dalek Gambit"	Ken Bentley	Roland Moore	Suzanne Clare, Movellans, Daleks	April 2020
