= BNE (artist) =

Anonymous graffiti artist

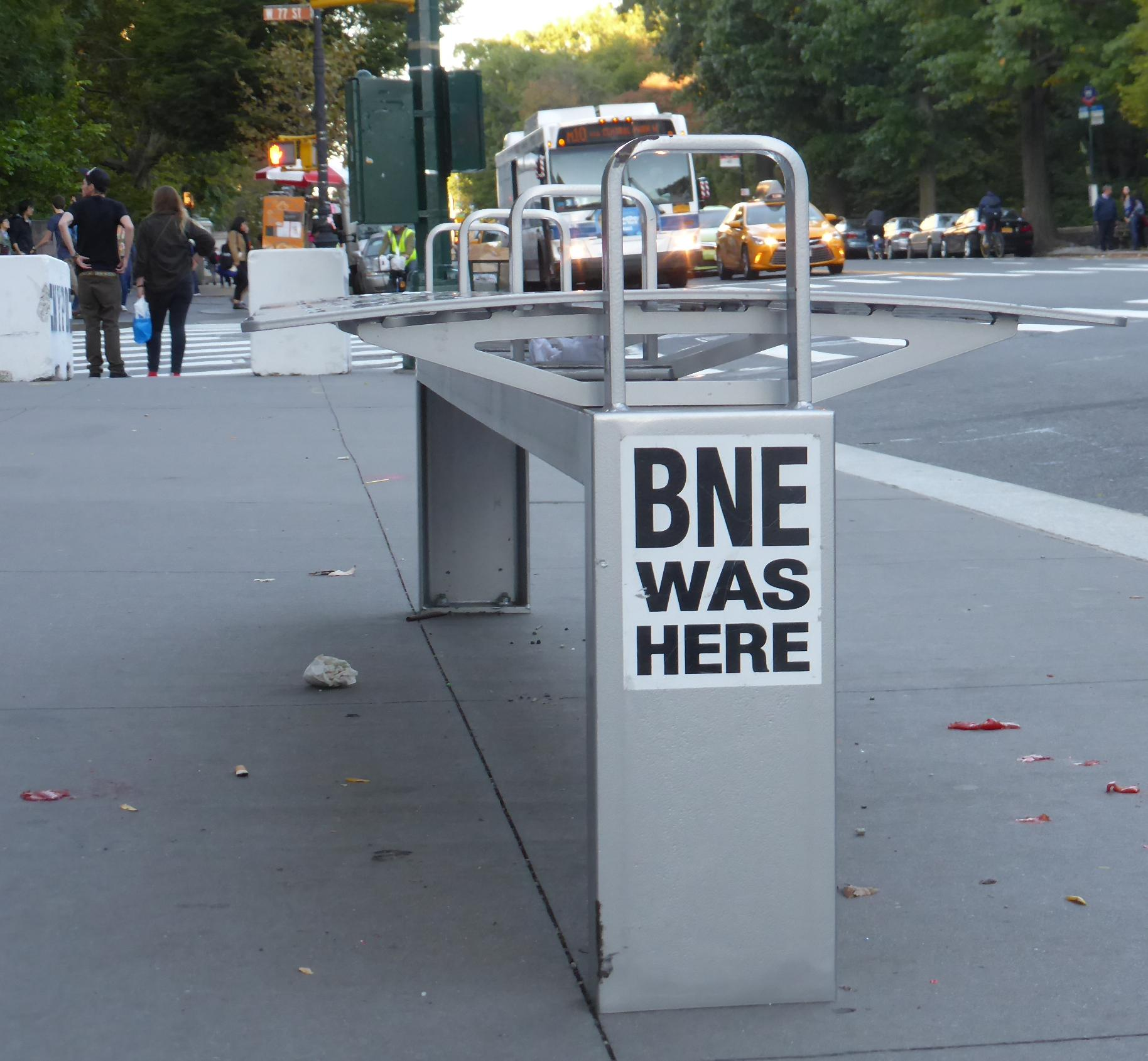
- Sticker at Central Park West and 77th Street, Manhattan
- Known for: Sticker bombing
- Movement: Graffiti

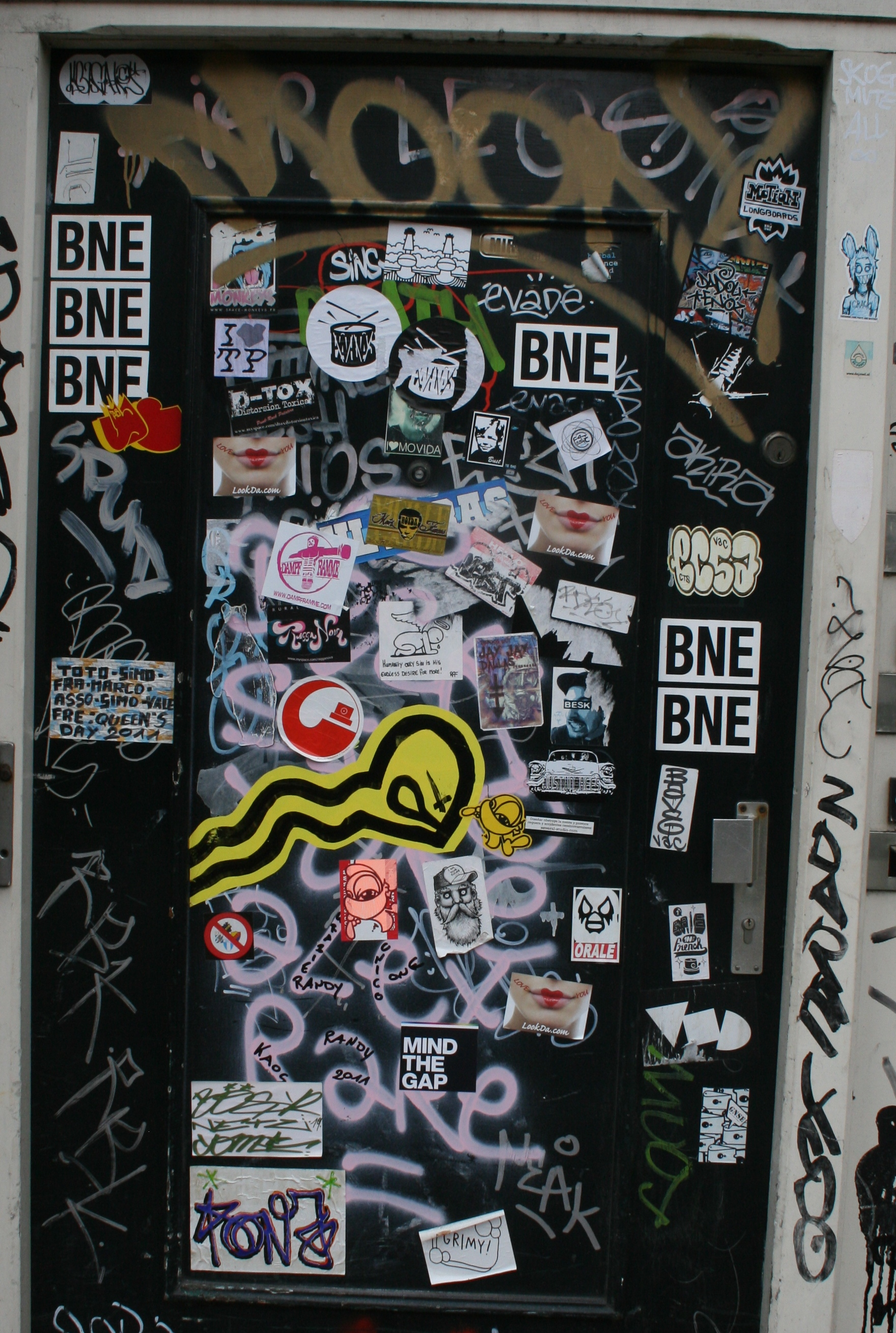
BNE among other stickers in Amsterdam, Netherlands

BNE is an anonymous graffiti artist known for stickers that read "BNE" or "BNE was here". The artist has left their mark in countries throughout the world, including the United States, Canada, Asia, Romania, Australia, Europe, and South America. "His accent and knowledge of local artists suggest he is from New York."

In May 2006, the San Francisco Police Department noted BNE's stickers appearing on public property across the city. As a result of the broken windows theory, Gavin Newsom, the mayor of San Francisco, offered a $2,500 reward for information leading to BNE's arrest. Peter F. Vallone Jr., chairman of the New York City Council Public Safety Committee, has called BNE "an unrepentant criminal who has cost honest taxpayers a lot of money".

In 2009, the advertising agency Mother in Hell's Kitchen, Manhattan, commissioned the artist to create a mural near their agency at 44th Street and Eleventh Avenue as part of an exhibition of the artist's work.

The song "The Children of the Night" on the Australian hip hop band Bliss n Eso's 2010 album Running on Air contains the lines: "Guerrilla activists seeing freedom clear / Across the globe sticking up, BNE WAS HERE."

In 2011 "BNE launched the BNE Water Foundation", however this charitable fund-raising project is no longer operating. Additionally, in 2013 and 2014 BNE was involved in several fundraising campaigns for Charity: Water.
