= Pass the Buck (1986 British game show) =

- Genre: Game show
- Presented by: George Layton
- Country of origin: United Kingdom
- Original language: English
- No. of series: 2

Production
- Running time: 30 minutes (inc. adverts)
- Production company: Thames in association with Action Time

Original release
- Network: ITV
- Release: 3 September 1986 – 23 August 1987

Pass the Buck is a British game show that aired on ITV from 3 September 1986 to 23 August 1987 and hosted by George Layton. A celebrity special edition was transmitted on Christmas Eve 1986, at 3:10 pm, with Dennis Waterman and Rula Lenska playing Simon Williams and Lucy Fielding. The designer was Barry Clark, associate producer Nigel Cook, director Robert Reed and the producer was Malcolm Morris. It was a Thames Television production, produced in association with Action Time Ltd.
