= Business for New Europe =

UK pressure group

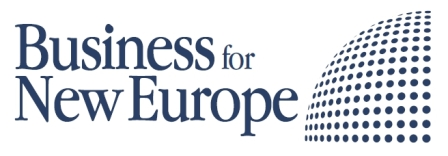
- Founded: 2006
- Type: Pressure group
- Location(s): London, United Kingdom (European Union) Brussels, Belgium
- Fields: European Union, EU-UK relations
- Key people: Lucy Thomas (Campaign Director); Roland Rudd (Chairman)
- Website: www.bnegroup.org

Business for New Europe (BNE) is a pressure group that advocates a positive case for the United Kingdom's membership of the European Union. It has offices in London and Brussels.

Business for New Europe was set up in 2006 by Roland Rudd, a former journalist on the Financial Times and the founder and chairman of the financial public relations firm Finsbury, to promote the benefits of the United Kingdom's membership of the European Union. BNE provides a platform for debate on European issues to business leaders and policy makers, seeking to ensure that a reasoned, pro-European voice is heard in the UK.

BNE's Advisory Council consists of chairmen and CEOs of FTSE 100 companies and its Executive consists of experts in foreign and economic policy, including former heads of the UK diplomatic service and senior journalists.

The organisation is not-for-profit and is funded by donations from the private sector.
