= Slim John =

- From left to right : Richard, Stevie and Slim John
- Genre: Language Instruction / Science Fiction
- Written by: John Wiles; David Campton; Brian Hayles; Ray Jenkins
- Starring: Simon Williams; Allan Lee; Juliet Harmer
- Country of origin: United Kingdom
- No. of episodes: 26

Production
- Production companies: BBC Television; British Council

Original release
- Release: 1969

Slim John is a 1969 BBC English language instruction serial made for overseas broadcast, in twenty-six episodes of fourteen minutes each, and in black and white. It involves android robots from outer space planning to take over the Earth, starting with London. They work following the directions of an authority called Control. Robot Five, nicknamed Slim John (Simon Williams), is himself a rebel robot who befriends a human couple, Stevie and Richard.

Slim John has extraordinary strength. The plots revolve around the other robots trying to eliminate him, and often include the fact that Slim John and the other robots have limited amounts of power available and need to recharge themselves regularly. Short grammar lessons are transmitted to all the robots at regular intervals via their hand-held communication devices (anticipating personal digital assistants by more than 30 years). These short lessons are presented not only to the robots (including Slim John), but in full screen to the viewers.

The serial was an educational tool used for English language instruction. It was supported by books and records as an English teaching method. The series was broadcast for years in countries like Turkey, Cyprus, Finland, France, Germany, Italy, Sweden, Brazil, Yugoslavia and other countries. Hungary, Poland and Romania were the only Eastern Bloc countries to show the serial, with an enormous response, in the 1970s. Because of its international target audience, the characters in Silm John do not drink or smoke, and the female main character (played by Juliet Harmer) does not wear trousers or a bikini. The serial's accompanying textbooks were illustrated by cartoonist Michael ffolkes.

== Availability ==
The series was available on various media, television, radio, disks and books.

== Cast ==
- Simon Williams as Slim John
- Allan Lee as Richard
- Juliet Harmer as Stevie
- Valentine Dyall as Dr Brain
- Bruno Barnabe as Miller
- Liz Reber as Zero

== List of episodes ==
1. The man in the cupboard
2. Where is Robot Five?
3. Is he in London?
4. Orders from Control
5. Catch that robot!
6. Find the house!
7. Robot Five is dangerous
8. The shop in Park Street
9. There were some men in the shop
10. We're going away
11. Out of London
12. We need to sleep
13. I want my car
14. The village
15. There's no one in the car
16. The airfield
17. Don't let him escape!
18. The hospital
19. Copies of Robot Five
20. The football match
21. Back to headquarters
22. Ready for the meeting
23. It's late
24. Control is coming
25. Our plan must work
26. The last day
