= Michael Gill (producer) =

English television producer (1923–2005)

- Born: George Michael Gill; 10 December 1923; Winchester, England
- Died: 20 October 2005 (aged 81); London, England
- Education: University of Edinburgh
- Occupations: Writer, director, producer
- Spouses: Yvonne Gilan (m. 1951; div. 1974); Georgina Denison (m. 1978)
- Children: 3, including Adrian
- Writing career
- Years active: 1959–1998

George Michael Gill (10 December 1923 – 20 October 2005) was an English television producer and director responsible for creating documentaries for the BBC.

== Background ==
Gill was born in Winchester, Hampshire but was brought up in Canterbury. He contracted tuberculosis as a child which disrupted his education severely; he spent four years in a spinal chair. He served in the RAF in Intelligence during the war. One of his most memorable debriefings was interrogating a German who had survived a 20,000 feet (6,100 m) fall over the Netherlands without his parachute having opened. His memoir of the war years, Growing into War, was published in 2005.

== Career ==
After the war he studied philosophy and psychology at the University of Edinburgh. After a period as a sub-editor and arts reviewer on The Scotsman, he joined the BBC in 1954. He worked first on radio but soon moved to television.

He is chiefly remembered for Civilisation: A Personal View by Kenneth Clark (1969) (director and co-producer) and Alistair Cooke's America (1973) (director and producer). Although the idea for Civilisation and its presenter, Kenneth Clark, were given to Gill, 'America', and the choice of presenter were entirely Gill's idea. In total Gill made more than 150 films for television and cinema, and won more than 40 major international awards.

== Personal life and death ==
In 1951 he married the actress Yvonne Gilan (1931–2018), best remembered for her portrayal of Mrs Peignoir in Fawlty Towers. The couple went on to have two sons: the writer, journalist and newspaper columnist Adrian, better known as A. A. Gill (1954–2016), and Nicholas. The marriage was dissolved in 1974, and Michael remarried in 1978 to Georgina Denison, with whom he had a daughter, Chloe. Nicholas Gill disappeared in 1998.

In 2000, Gill was diagnosed with Alzheimer's disease. He died from sepsis and bronchopneumonia at Chelsea and Westminster Hospital on 20 October 2005, aged 81.
