= John Arnatt =

British actor (1917–1999)

- Born: John Edwin Arnatt; 9 May 1917; Petrograd, Russia
- Died: 21 December 1999 (aged 82); Surrey, England, UK
- Occupation: Actor
- Spouses: Betty Huntley-Wright (m. 1948, divorced) Sheila Tracy (m. 1962)
- Children: 1

John Edwin Arnatt (9 May 1917 – 21 December 1999) was a British actor, best known for his role in Doctor Who where he played Time Lord Cardinal Borusa in the 1978 serial The Invasion of Time (1978).

== Life and career ==
=== Early life and education ===
John Edwin Arnatt was born in Petrograd, Russia on 9 May 1917. His parents were Francis and Ethel Marion (née Jephcott) Arnatt. He attended Epworth College. Arnatt trained for the stage at the Royal Academy of Dramatic Art.

=== Career ===
One of Arnatt's most high-profile roles was as "The Deputy Sheriff of Nottingham" in the fourth and final series of 1955-60 TV series The Adventures of Robin Hood starring Richard Greene. His character filled in for Alan Wheatley, who played the regular sheriff. Arnatt's character was introduced and interacted with Wheatley's character in the episode "The Devil You Don't Know". In the 1962 film Dr Crippen, starring Donald Pleasence (who also had a recurring role in "The Adventures of Robin Hood" as Prince John), Arnatt played Chief Inspector Walter Dew. Arnatt also played an imitation "M" to Tom Adams' imitation James Bond in two films, Licensed to Kill and Where the Bullets Fly (1966). In 1967, Arnatt got something of a promotion when he played the High Sheriff of Nottingham opposite Barrie Ingham's Robin in the film A Challenge for Robin Hood.

Never well known, he amassed numerous television credits in programmes such as Steptoe and Son, Keeping Up Appearances, Dangerfield, Lovejoy, The Professionals, House of Cards, Thriller and Z-Cars. He had a recurring role in the first two series of the ITV legal drama, The Main Chance (1969–70) and in Doctor Who he was the second actor to play Time Lord Cardinal Borusa in the serial The Invasion of Time (1978). Later, in the television film, Marple: The Moving Finger (1985), he played Reverend Guy Calthrop.

As a Freemason, he was elected Master of the Green Room Lodge no. 2957 in 1995.

=== Personal life and death ===
Arnatt was married twice and had one child.

Arnatt died aged 82, on 21 December 1999.

== Filmography ==
=== Film ===
Year	Film	Role	Notes
1948	The Only Way	Marquis de Boulainvilliers	TV film
1948	Fly Away Peter	John Neilson	TV film
1948	At the Villa Rose	Harry Wethermill	TV film
1949	Meet Simon Cherry	Tommy	Uncredited
1950	Dick Barton at Bay	Jackson	
1951	Cry, the Beloved Country	Prison Warden	Uncredited
1952	Circumstantial Evidence	Steve Harrison	
1953	House of Blackmail	Pete Carter	
1954	Forbidden Cargo	Customs Officer	Uncredited
1955	The Star Without a Name	Grig	TV film
1955	Richard of Bordeaux	Henry Bolingbroke, Earl of Derby	TV film
1956	The End Begins	Hugh Pakenham	TV film
1956	For the Defence	Crawford	TV film
1956	Tearaway	Chief Inspector Ball	TV film
1957	The Trial of Mary Dugan	District Attorney Galwey	TV film
1957	The Passionate Stranger	Maurice Lamport	
1957	The Indifferent Shepherd	Hugh Wigmore	TV film
1958	Hunted	Doctor Hildo	TV film
1958	Background	Bill Ogden	TV film
1960	The Bulldog Breed	Briggs	Uncredited
1961	No Love for Johnnie	Gregson, BBC Reporter	Uncredited
1961	The Impersonator	Detective Superintendent Fletcher	
1961	Whistle Down the Wind	Superintendent Teesdale	
1961	The Third Alibi	Superintendent Ross	
1962	Only Two Can Play	Bill	
1962	Out of the Fog	Detective Superintendent Chadwick	
1963	Shadow of Fear	Sharp	
1963	Dr. Crippen	Inspector Dew	
1963	The Set Up	Superintendent Ross	Edgar Wallace Mysteries
1964	Clash by Night	Inspector Croft	
1965	Joey Boy	Brigadier Charles Chapman	
1965	Hysteria	Mr. James	
1965	Licensed to Kill	Rockwell	
1966	Where the Bullets Fly	Rockwell	
1967	A Challenge for Robin Hood	Sheriff of Nottingham	
1967	Our Mother's House	Man Client	
1971	Crucible of Terror	Bill	
1973	Paganini Strikes Again	Inspector Mainwaring	
1975	A Suitable Case for Killing?	Public Prosecutor	TV film documentary
1979	Licensed to Love and Kill	Merlin	
1997	A Royal Scandal	Archbishop	TV film

== Television ==
Year	Film	Role	Notes
1953-1957	Sunday Night Theatre	Various roles	6 episodes
1954	Emney Enterprises		1 episode
1955	The Granville Melodramas	Captain Skinner	Episode: "The Silver King"
1955	Colonel March of Scotland Yard	Wesley	Episode: "The Case of the Misguided Missal"
1955	London Playhouse	Finch	Episode: "Fighting Chance"
1955-1961	ITV Television Playhouse	Various roles	4 episodes
1956	My Friend Charles	Detective Inspector Dane	Recurring role
1956	The Adventures of the Big Man	Owen Carrigan	Episode: "Rich Girl"
1956	The Other Man	Harry Vincent	2 episodes
1956	ITV Play of the Week	Bernard K. Froy	Episode: "I Killed the Count"
1957	Escape	Tom	2 episodes
1957	Sword of Freedom	Count Ugo	Episode: "The Woman in the Picture"
1957	Dixon of Dock Green	Inspector Dix	Episode: "Silver Jubilee"
1958	The Diary of Samuel Pepys	Duke of Albemarie	Series regular
1958	The Royalty	John Andrews	Series regular
1959	The Last Chronicle of Barset	Mr. Robarts	Recurring role
1959	The Invisible Man	Lord Peversham	Episode: "The Big Plot"
1959	Armchair Theatre	Dr. Lederer	Episode: "A House of His Own"
1960	The Adventures of Robin Hood	Deputy Sheriff of Nottingham	Series regular
1961	Probation Officer	Sergeant Conway	1 episode
1961	ITV Play of the Week	Alec	Episode: "Doctor Everyman's Hour"
1961	Deadline Midnight	Pearce	Episode: "Take Over"
1961	BBC Sunday-Night Play	Superintendent Harding	Episode: "The Test"
1962	Sir Francis Drake	Duke of Cordova	2 episodes
1962	Armchair Theatre	General von Schiltz	Episode: "Night Conspirators"
1962	Probation Officer	Ralph Cooper	1 episode
1962	The Saint	Major Fanshire	Episode: "The Arrow of God"
1963	The Human Jungle	Recorder	Episode: "Time-Check"
1963	The Plane Makers	Peter Humphreys	Episode: "Too Much to Lose"
1963-1964	Emergency Ward 10	Doctor Fitzgerald	Series regular
1964	Miss Adventure		Episode: "The Velvet Touch"
1964	Fire Crackers	Station Officer Blazer	Recurring role
1964	Sykes and a...		Episode: "Sykes and a Bird"
1965	The Airbase	Air Commodore	Episode: "Peace at Any Price"
1965	The Third Man	Count Hagar	Episode: "Man at the Top"
1965	Z-Cars	Briggs	Episode: "A Matter of Give and Take"
1966	Dixon of Dock Green	John Chiltern	Episode: "The Fourth Finger"
1968	Z-Cars	Frank Bowers	Episode: "Blame It on Father Christmas"
1969	Callan	High Commissioner	Episode: "Blackmailers Should Be Discouraged"
1969	Strange Report	Inspector Hughes	Episode: "Kidnap - Whose Pretty Girl Are You?"
1969-1970	The Main Chance	Sidney Bulmer	Series regular
1970	Take Three Girls	Doctor	Episode: "Variation on May and September"
1970	Randall and Hopkirk (Deceased)	Uniformed Inspector	Episode: "Could You Recognise the Man Again?"
1970	Steptoe and Son	Copeland	Episode: "The Three Feathers"
1972	Doctor in Charge	Dr. Lanchbery	Episode: "Doctors' Lib"
1972	Man at the Top	Ogilvie	Episode: "Don't Rock the Boat"
1972	Thirty-Minute Theatre	Coroner	Episode: "The Seventh Juror"
1972	Softly, Softly: Task Force	Chief Constable Daniels	Episode: "On the Third Day"
1972	The Pathfinders	Wing Commander Alexander	Episode: "Sitting Ducks"
1973	Barlow	Chief Constable Daniels	Episode: "Publicity"
1973	Special Branch	Denning	Episode: "The Other Man"
1973	Freewheelers	Hassell	3 episodes
1974	Marked Personal	James Lawrence	2 episodes
1974	Thriller	Mr. Robinson	Episode: "Sign It Death"
1974	General Hospital	James Lytton	1 episode
1975	Crown Court	Harold Gilman	Episode: "The Obsession"
1975	Doctor on the Go	Mr. Edwards	Episode: "Clunk Click"
1977	The Cedar Tree	General Von Heynig	2 episodes
1978	Doctor Who	Borusa	The Invasion of Time
1979	Turning Year Tales	Cyril Muncaster	Episode: "Clubs"
1979	Thundercloud	Vicar	Episode: "Bats in the Belfry"
1979	The Onedin Line	Mr. Ramsden	Episode: "Storm Clouds"
1980	The Professionals	Humber	Episode: "Black Out"
1980	Rings on Their Fingers	Mr. Taylor	Episode: "Ladies Man"
1981	Shelley	Thomas Humphries	Episode: "Signing On"
1981	Wilfred and Eileen	Major	1 episode
1981-1986	The Kenny Everett Television Show	Various roles	10 episodes
1982	King's Royal	Sir James Spence	1 episode
1982	Jackanory	King	Episode: "Ivan the Ninny"
1983	The Cleopatras	Sophron	Episode: "80 BC"
1983	Don't Wait Up	Man at cricket match	1 episode
1984	Tripper's Day	Customer	Episode: "Special Offers"
1985	Miss Marple	Reverend Guy Calthrop	Episodes: "The Moving Finger"
1986	Bluebell	Pierre	2 episodes
1990	House of Cards	Sir Jasper Grainger	Miniseries
1992	Covington Cross	Doctor 1	Episode: "The Persecution"
1993	Lovejoy	Stanley Barton	Episode: "Lovejoy Loses It"
1993	Alleyn Mysteries	Nash	Episode: "The Nursing Home Murder"
1993	Keeping Up Appearances	Sir Edward	Episode: "Looking at Properties"
1993	If You See God, Tell Him	National Telephone Grandad	1 episode
1995	Dangerfield	Harry Campbell	Recurring role
1999	Dad	Mr. Jarrold	Episode: "Securidad"
