= Joe Baker (comedian) =

British comedian (1928–2001)

- Publicity photo, c.1967
- Born: Joseph William Anthony Cunningham; 14 December 1928; West Ham, London, England
- Died: 16 May 2001 (aged 72); Los Angeles, California, U.S.
- Occupations: Comedian, voice artist, character actor

Joseph William Anthony Cunningham (14 December 1928 – 16 May 2001), known professionally as Joe Baker, was an English comedian, voice artist, and character actor, who in later years worked in films and television in the United States.

== Life and career ==
He was born in West Ham, London, the son of music hall entertainers, Joe Baker and Olga, who performed as a bickering married couple. During his teens, he appeared on stage in London but with little success. When in National Service, he met entertainer Jack Douglas, and after demobilisation the pair formed a comic partnership, appearing in pantomimes and summer season theatre shows for the Moss Empire circuit. The pair appeared together on television series Crackerjack! and New Look in the 1950s, and in the 1961 film Nearly a Nasty Accident.

Baker then launched a solo career as a comic, appearing in London nightclubs, in the theatre show Joey, Joey based on the life of Joseph Grimaldi, and as a character actor in No Hiding Place. After featuring in Josephine Douglas's Fire Crackers (1964) with Alfred Marks, he was given the lead in two TV series, The Joe Baker Show (1965) and Joe Baker's Half Dozen (1967), and the sitcom My Man Joe (1967). He was known for his impressions of American stars, such as James Cagney. He also recorded an LP of prank calls, Dial Joe Baker (1965).

In the mid-1970s, he moved to America with his family. He appeared as a regular performer on The Steve Allen Comedy Hour, and in episodes of Fantasy Island and Highway to Heaven. He was frequently used as a voice actor in animations, including as Larry in The Robonic Stooges, and as Lon in Disney's Pocahontas. He also had roles in several Hollywood films, including Waxwork (1988), Bugsy (1991), Robin Hood: Men in Tights (1993), and Dumb and Dumber (1994).

He continued to work as a voice actor in Hollywood until his death from heart failure in Los Angeles in 2001, at the age of 72.

His daughter is the television writer and producer Sarah Jane Cunningham.

== Filmography ==
- Nearly a Nasty Accident (1961)
- Where the Bullets Fly (1966)
- The Apple Dumpling Gang Rides Again (1979)
- C.H.O.M.P.S. (1979)
- Waxwork (1988)
- Dutch (1991)
- Bugsy (1991)
- Waxwork II: Lost in Time (1992)
- Freaked (1993)
- Robin Hood: Men in Tights (1993)
- Dumb and Dumber (1994)
- Pocahontas (1995) - voice
- Quest for Camelot (1998) - voice
- Art House (1998)
