= Where the Bullets Fly =

1966 British film by John Gilling

- Original American film poster
- Directed by: John Gilling
- Screenplay by: Michael Pittock
- Produced by: James Ward
- Starring: Tom Adams; Dawn Addams; Michael Ripper
- Cinematography: David Holmes
- Music by: Kenny Graham
- Distributed by: Embassy Pictures
- Release date: 5 September 1966 (United Kingdom)
- Running time: 88 minutes
- Country: United Kingdom
- Language: English

Where the Bullets Fly is a 1966 British comedy spy film directed by John Gilling and starring Tom Adams, John Arnatt, Dawn Addams, Tim Barrett and Michael Ripper.

Adams and Arnatt reprised their roles from Licensed to Kill (1965).

== Plot ==
The film begins with a pre-credit sequence in which a group of unnamed terrorists have parked a vehicle containing a guided missile pointed straight at the Palace of Westminster whilst politicians are heard on the film's soundtrack. They are thwarted by a group of older women in a tour group who turn out to be cross-dressing commandos who eliminate the terrorists with sub-machine guns and grenades. They are led by Agent Charles Vine with his second-in-command being Lt. Guy Fawkes who has saved the Parliament of England.

The film proper begins with the Royal Air Force testing a secret light-weight metal called "Spurium" that enables nuclear aircraft to fly. An unnamed sinister organisation led by a man named Angel hijacks the DC-3 aircraft by hypnotising the RAF Regiment guards and flying the plane to another location but they are shot down by the RAF.

Afraid the incident may happen again, Vine is assigned as security to the project. However Angel's organisation kidnap Vine and replace him with one of their own men named Seraph. Obtaining information before he escapes allows Seraph to steal a sample of Spurium to be sold to the Soviet Union, but the Russians believe he is double-crossing them and kill him.

Vine escapes and reports to the RAF airbase, where he meets his RAF counterpart, Flight Lieutenant Felicity "Fiz" Moonlight. Angel's men try an all-out assault on the airfield to capture the next nuclear aircraft set to fly. Vine and Angel end up in the nuclear aircraft that takes flight but Vine is rescued by Moonlight.

== Cast ==
- Tom Adams as Charles Vine
- Dawn Addams as Flight Lieutenant Felicity 'Fiz' Moonlight
- Michael Ripper as Angel
- Tim Barrett as Seraph
- Sid James as mortuary attendant
- Wilfrid Brambell as train guard
- Joe Baker as minister
- John Arnatt as Rockwell
- Ronald Leigh-Hunt as Thursby
- Marcus Hammond as O'Neil
- Tony Arpino as butler
- Michael Balfour as band leader
- Tom Bowman as Russian Colonel
- Maurice Browning as Cherub
- Michael James Cox as Lt. Guy Fawkes
- Sue Donovan as Celia
- Peter Ducrow as Prof. Harding
- James Ellis as Flight Lt. Fotheringham
- Heidi Erich as Carruthers
- Suzan Farmer as Caron
- Michael Goldie as labourer
- David Gregory as R.A.F. Sergeant
- Gerard Heinz as Venstram
- John Horsley as Air Marshal
- Charles Houston as co-pilot
- Patrick Jordan as Russian

== Production ==
The Royal Air Force cooperated with the producers allowing several scenes to be filmed at RAF Biggin Hill.

Different dialogue was substituted for the American release in which the opening parliamentary satire was reduced in length and the word "Biggles" is replaced by "Batman" when Seraph is talking of his excitement at visiting Secret Service headquarters.

Originally, the studio announced the title of this film as The Third Best Secret Agent in the Whole Wide World.

== Reception ==
The Monthly Film Bulletin wrote: "Vine's new adventure in this follow-up to Licensed to Kill is conceived largely in comedy terms, carried out with more zest than finesse and with rather too much of the fun failing to score. The fault, one suspects, rests less with the players than with the script, which is too content with the obvious and makes no bones about playing to the gallery (notably in the trio of guest appearances inserted just for the hell of it, with Sidney James, Wilfrid Brambell and Joe Baker). Michael Ripper and Tim Barrett make fetching villains, and the machine-gun blaze at the airfield will content most schoolboys; but the cursorily-treated Dawn Addams might just as well have stayed at home."

== Sequel ==
A third film in the Charles Vine series, called Somebody's Stolen Our Russian Spy (1976) (also known as O.K. Yevtushenko) was produced by James Ward, and written by Michael Pittock. The script was polished and directed by José Luis Madrid, who shot the whole film in Spain rather than United Kingdom where the previous instalments were made. Tom Adams reprised his role as Vine.
