= Carsten Lorenz =

German filmmaker

- Born: August 21, 1961 (age 65); Velbert, Germany
- Education: American Film Institute, University of Television and Film Munich
- Occupation: producer
- Years active: 1984–present
- Spouse: Wendy Lorenz (m. 1993; div. 2001)
- Children: 3

Carsten H.W. Lorenz (born August 21, 1961), known professionally as Carsten Lorenz, is a German film producer. He is best known for his work as a regular collaborator of director Roland Emmerich.

== Early life and career ==
Lorenz started his professional career as a music journalist interviewing punk rock bands and breaking New Wave artists.

Under the mentorship of legendary German film critic Michael Lentz, Lorenz interviewed filmmakers like John Waters, Oliver Stone and Alan Parker. He then got accepted into the University of Television and Film Munich, where he met director Roland Emmerich, who he collaborates with till today.

After studying at the American Film Institute, Lorenz permanently moved to Los Angeles in 1989. His mix of feature films have earned a combined over $1 billion at the worldwide theatrical box office.

== Personal life ==
Lorenz lives in Los Angeles with his longtime partner, science teacher Gina Maria Taylor.

He has assembled an eclectic art collection including works by Martin Kippenberger, Alexander Calder, Rene Margritte, Takashi Murakami and Niki de Saint Phalle.

== Filmography ==
Year	Title	Credited as			
Year	Title	Producer	Executive Producer	Co-Producer	Producer-Executive
1988	Hollywood Monster	No	Yes	No	No
1989	Moon 44	No	Yes	No	No
1991	Manta – Der Film	No	Yes	No	No
1991	Eye of the Storm	Yes	No	No	No
1994	Heavenly Creatures	No	No	No	Yes
1992	The Crying Game	No	No	No	Yes
1994	Invasion of Privacy	Yes	No	No	No
1995	Prince Valiant	Yes	No	No	No
1999	The Little Vampire	No	No	Yes	No
2000	Trapped	No	No	Yes	No
2001	Silent Warning (TV film)	No	Yes	No	No
2004	Harold & Kumar Go to White Castle	No	Yes	No	No
2005	Boogeyman	No	Yes	No	No
2006	The Grudge	No	Yes	No	No
2007	Don't Come Knocking	No	No	Yes	No
2007	Neverwas	No	No	Yes	No
2008	Rise - Bloodhunter	No	Yes	No	No
2008	Smother	No	Yes	No	No
2009	Harold & Kumar Escape from Guantanamo Bay	No	Yes	No	No
2010	Tekken	No	Yes	No	No
2011	Wrong Side of Town	Yes	No	No	No
2012	Blood Out	Yes	No	No	No
2012	The Courier	No	Yes	No	No
2013	Odd Thomas	No	Yes	No	No
2013	Unknown Caller	No	Yes	No	No
2013	13 Sins	No	Yes	No	No
2013	Elsa & Fred	No	Yes	No	No
2014	The Last Supper	No	Yes	No	No
2015	Stonewall	Yes	No	No	No
2015	Operator	No	Yes	No	No
2016	Independence Day: Resurgence	No	Yes	No	No
2017	Bad Samaritan	No	Yes	No	No
2017	Zoe	No	Yes	No	No
2018	Serenity	No	Yes	No	No
2019	Midway	No	Yes	No	No
2020	Greenland	No	Yes	No	No
2022	Moonfall	No	Yes	No	No
2026	Coyote vs. Acme	No	Yes	No	No
