= Mister Ten Per Cent =

1967 British film by Peter Graham Scott

- Directed by: Peter Graham Scott
- Written by: Mira Avrech; Charlie Drake; Norman Hudis; Lew Schwarz
- Produced by: W.A. Whittaker
- Starring: Charlie Drake; George Baker; Annette Andre; John Le Mesurier; Derek Nimmo; Una Stubbs
- Cinematography: Gerald Gibbs
- Edited by: Jack Harris
- Music by: Ron Goodwin
- Production company: Associated British Picture Corporation (ABPC)
- Distributed by: Warner-Pathé
- Release date: March 1967
- Running time: 84 minutes
- Country: United Kingdom
- Language: English

Mister Ten Per Cent is a 1967 British comedy film directed by Peter Graham Scott and starring Charlie Drake, Derek Nimmo and Wanda Ventham. It was written by Mira Avrech, Charlie Drake, Norman Hudis and Lew Schwarz.

It was the last in a series of four films featuring Drake produced by the Associated British Picture Corporation, the previous being Sands of the Desert (1960), Petticoat Pirates (1961) and The Cracksman (1963).

== Plot ==
Percy Pointer, a construction worker and amateur dramatist, writes a drama Oh My Lord and hopes to have it professionally produced. A dishonest producer agrees to back the play, hoping that it will be a disaster, so that he can claim insurance on its failure. To Percy's distress, the first audience see the play as a slapstick comedy, not the drama he intended it to be.

The play is a hit and audiences love it. But Percy is upset by the turn of events and attempts to ruin the production. It then emerges that in his ignorance of showbusiness contracts, he has signed away 10% of any revenue to so many people that he actually owes 110% of the money.

His attempts to sabotage the production lead to his being banned from the theatre. But with great resourcefulness, he manages to enter the theatre backstage and create havoc. With the audience thinking this is a part of the comedy and hugely enjoying it, Percy takes to the stage and addresses the audience, asking them why they find his drama so funny. No-one can find an answer, but they cheer him anyway.

== Cast ==
- Charlie Drake as Percy Pointer
- Derek Nimmo as Tony
- Wanda Ventham as Kathy
- John Le Mesurier as Jocelyn Macauley
- Anthony Nicholls as Casey
- Noel Dyson as Mrs. Gorman
- John Hewer as Townsend
- Anthony Gardner as Claude Crepe
- Ronald Radd as publicity man
- John Laurie as scotsman
- Colin Douglas as policeman
- Annette Andre as Muriel
- Justine Lord as Lady Dorothea
- George Baker as Lord Edward
- Joyce Blair as 1st Lady Dorothea
- Una Stubbs as 2nd Lady Dorothea
- Nicole Shelby as Fiona
- Gina Warwick as Ellen
- Percy Herbert as Inspector Great
- Desmond Roberts as manservant
- Colin Douglas as policeman
- Lyn Ashley as the maid
- Roy Beck as theater-goer
- Pauline Chamberlain as woman in theatre audience
- Carol Cleveland as girl at theatre party
- Valerie Van Ost as girl at theatre party

== Production ==
The film was shot at Elstree Studios and on location in London.

== Critical reception ==
Monthly Film Bulletin wrote: "On television Charlie Drake has occasionally revealed himself as a comedian with a real talent for the kind of frantic knockabout that characterised the early Sennett comedies (one remembers particularly an inspired performance of Tchaikovsky's 1812, with Drake as conductor and every member of the orchestra). Here, alas, his talents are swamped by characterless direction and a script which lumbers along with clumsy inevitability. Attempts to instil some life into the proceedings with a few risqué jokes and some desperate malapropisms ('I will not have my work pasteurised') are capped by a tear-jerking finale which belongs more to a Norman Wisdom film than to Charlie Drake's hitherto much sharper wit."

Kine Weekly wrote: "The story of the would-be serious playwright whose work makes audiences laugh is not as crazy as it appears and, indeed, has a historical basis in the shape of a play called Young England (1934) that had 'em rolling in the aisles a generation ago. The film falls uneasily into two parts. In the first hour Charlie Drake and the remainder of the cast play the plot almost dead straight, though laughs are still there for Drake's fans. Then the whole plot explodes in an orgy of brilliant slapstick when Drake, as Percy, deploys his knockabout talent in an amusing variety ideas to stop his play from being laughed at. The finale, in which he completely wrecks London fist night, is a riot."

The Radio Times Guide to Films gave the film 2/5 stars, writing: "For all his success on TV, Charlie Drake has failed to make an impact on the big screen, with only four movies in 13 years before this flop. Co-scripted by Drake and Norman Hudis, it's a comedy about the deliberate staging of a box-office bomb to claim the insurance, which predated Mel Brooks's similarly themed The Producers by a year. In spite of an accomplished cast, it is killed stone dead by Drake himself, who was so hurt by its failure that he went into temporary retirement."

== Releases ==
The film was released on DVD in 2014. The sleeve notes open with the words "Predating Mel Brooks' The Producers by a year...", drawing attention to the resemblance between the plots of the two films.
