= Colin Douglas (actor) =

English actor (1912–1991)

- Douglas in the 1970s
- Born: Colin Martin Douglas; 28 July 1912; Newcastle upon Tyne, England
- Died: 21 December 1991 (aged 79); London, England
- Occupation: Actor
- Years active: 1948–1991
- Spouse: Gina Cachia (m. 1949; died 1989)
- Children: 5

Colin Martin Douglas (28 July 1912 – 21 December 1991) was an English actor. Born in Newcastle upon Tyne, Northumberland, Douglas was educated at the Farm School in Cumberland. Following his elder brother Jock, he emigrated to New Zealand when he was sixteen, working in sheep farming and lumberjacking, but only stayed for five years before auditioning to study at RADA, after begging his father to let him return to try to become an actor. He did some time in repertory, but the Second World War halted his career. In the armed forces he went to Catterick and the Royal Military College, Sandhurst, became Captain and Adjutant in the Border Regiment, and served in the 1st Airborne Division. During the Allied invasion of Sicily his glider, like many others, was released too early, and the crew were in the sea for two days (many members of other crews perished). He was also dropped by glider at Arnhem, during the ill-fated Operation Market Garden but in later years was reluctant to talk about it. He was appearing on stage in Alan Plater's play Close the Coalhouse Door when he heard he had been chosen for a leading part in A Family at War. This popular series ran for 52 episodes from 1970.

His film credits include The Trollenberg Terror (1958), Captain Clegg (1962) and Mister Ten Per Cent (1967).

His theatre credits include One For the Pot, one of Brian Rix's Whitehall farces in the '60s, a spell with the Royal Shakespeare Company which included a production of Toad of Toad Hall with David Suchet, and Exchange in the late '80s, with his good friend Martin Jarvis.

His television credits include Dr. Finlay's Casebook, Doctor Who (in the serials The Enemy of the World and Horror of Fang Rock). Also the 1955 version of The Children of the New Forest. He also had roles in Fire Crackers, The Buccaneers, Danger Man, Love Story, Rooms, Angel Pavement, Follyfoot, Telford's Change, When The Boat Comes In, The Sweeney, Dick Barton: Special Agent, The Seventh Juror, The Flockton Flyer, Headmaster, Thicker than Water (an instalment of the anthology series Play for Today), The Night People, The Omega Factor, The Greenhill Pals and The Pickwick Papers.

Colin Douglas had a lead role in the drama A Family at War (1970–72) where he played Edwin Ashton in a glum portrayal of a Liverpool family in the 1930s and '40s. Fifty-two episodes were made by Granada TV and the series proved to be very popular and often drew a weekly audience of over 22 million viewers, sometimes knocking Coronation Street off the top spot. It was also loved by audiences in Scandinavia, and the cast were treated like superstars when they visited.

Another lead role was Bonehead in the comical children's black and white BBC TV series Bonehead which lasted two seasons between 1960 and 1962. It was about three hopeless crooks, Paul Whitsun-Jones as Boss, Douglas Blackwell as Happy and Colin Douglas as Bonehead. Boss would devise a criminal scheme and along with the eternally miserable Happy and the idiot Bonehead (whose catchphrase was "Shall I bash 'im, Boss?"), they would try to carry the scheme out. But things always went wrong, often thanks to Bonehead and the watchful eye of PC Pilchard. To try to rescue something from the mess, Boss would suggest an alternative scheme with the phrase "plan B Bonehead".

Colin Douglas's last role was as troubled Labour Party veteran Frank Twist in Alan Bleasdale's TV series GBH.

He was married to actress Gina Cachia for 40 years, until her death in 1989. Their children were Timothy, Amanda (killed, aged 20, in a traffic accident whilst at the University of Kent, Canterbury), Angus, Blaise and Piers. He and his young family lived in the Oakleigh Park area of North London, before moving to a large mansion block flat overlooking the park, in Battersea, London, and his hobbies were sea fishing, golf and cooking. He also served on the actors' Equity Council for several years.

== Filmography ==
Year	Title	Role	Notes
1948	Dick Barton: Special Agent	Stark	Uncredited
1950	Seven Days to Noon	Soldier In House Search	Uncredited
1952	Ghost Ship	1st Engineer	
1954	River Beat	Superintendent	
1955	The Hornet's Nest	Martin	
1956	Doublecross	Police Sergeant	
1957	Miracle in Soho	Supervisor	
1958	The Trollenberg Terror	Hans	
1960–1965	Danger Man	Mego/The Stranger	Two episodes
1962	The Valiant	Chief Gunner's Mate	
1962	Captain Clegg	Pirate Bosun	
1964	Fire Crackers	George	Five episodes
1965	Game for Three Losers	Supt. Manton	
1967	Mister Ten Per Cent	Policeman	
1967	The Forsyte Saga	Policeman	Miniseries
1967 & 1977	Doctor Who	Donald Bruce/Reuben/Rutan (voice role; uncredited)	Two serials: The Enemy of the World; Horror of Fang Rock
1968	Don't Raise the Bridge, Lower the River	Barman	
1978	All Creatures Great and Small	Mr. Horner	Episode: "Pups, Pigs and Pickle"
1983	The Winds of War	John Dill	Miniseries
