= Anthony Hickox =

English film director (1959–2023)

- Born: 30 January 1959; London, England
- Died: October 2023 (aged 64); Bucharest, Romania
- Occupations: Film director, television director, film producer, screenwriter
- Notable work: Waxwork; Hellraiser III: Hell on Earth; Prince Valiant
- Spouse: Madalina Anea
- Parents: Douglas Hickox (father); Anne V. Coates (mother)
- Relatives: Emma E. Hickox (sister); John Coates (uncle)

Anthony Hickox (30 January 1959 – October 2023) was an English film director, producer, actor, and screenwriter.

Hickox was best known for his work in the horror genre, with films like Waxwork and its sequel, Waxwork II: Lost in Time, Sundown: The Vampire in Retreat, Hellraiser III: Hell on Earth, and Warlock: The Armageddon. He directed a 1997 film adaptation of the long-running Prince Valiant comic strip starring Stephen Moyer as the eponymous character.

== Early life and education ==
Hickox was born on 30 January 1959 in Hampstead, London to a family of filmmakers. He was the eldest son of the director Douglas Hickox and Academy Award-winning editor Anne V. Coates and elder brother of editor Emma E. Hickox and James D.R. Hickox. He was also a great-nephew of J Arthur Rank, 1st Baron Rank, head of The Rank Organisation.

Hickox was educated at Aiglon College in Switzerland.

== Career ==
After starting as a club promoter in London, Hickox went to Los Angeles in 1986 and became a writer and director during the late 1980s. He then started directing action movies after a list of 1990s horror films including the third entry in the Hellraiser series. This led to HBO hiring him to make its first action/horror, Full Eclipse, which spawned the Friday night action slot that lasted over 5 years and to which Hickox made several more contributions. At the same time, he continued his deal at Universal where he shot pilots for Extreme, Two, Martial Law and New York Undercover.

After working with Natascha McElhone and William Hurt on Contaminated Man, he went on to direct Katherine Heigl and Stephen Moyer in a feature-length adaptation of the Prince Valiant comic strip. The film was described by one of its actors, Warwick Davis, as "a disaster from start to finish" which was "premiered, panned and bombed". He blamed this on Hickox, who he said "seemed intent on partying all night long and giving roles to his friends."

Hickox then directed Steven Seagal in Submerged, a critical and commercial failure, and Eddie Griffin in Blast. In 2008, he completed the British horror movie Knife Edge. In 2019, he completed Underdogs Rising with Chris Pang and Infamous 6 which shot in Hong Kong, for PopLife Global owned by Ex Chatman of Disney China.

Hickox was on the board of directors of the now-dissolved film distribution company Seven Arts Pictures run by Peter Hoffman, the ex-chairman of Carolco and the production company Medient Studios run by Indian film producer Manu Kumaran.

Amongst one of his latter works was a Federico Fellini biopic, and Zombie Bride, shot in Spain.

== Personal life ==
Hickox was married to Romanian actress Madalina Anea.

== Death ==
Hickox died in Bucharest, Romania in October 2023 at the age of 64.

== Filmography ==
=== Feature films ===
- Waxwork (1988)
- Sundown: The Vampire in Retreat (1989)
- Waxwork II: Lost in Time (1992)
- Hellraiser III: Hell on Earth (1992)
- Full Eclipse (1993)
- Warlock: The Armageddon (1993)
- Payback (1995)
- Invasion of Privacy (1996)
- Prince Valiant (1997)
- Storm Catcher (1999)
- Jill Rips (2000)
- Contaminated Man (2000)
- Last Run (2001)
- Federal Protection (2002)
- Consequence (2003)
- Blast (2004)
- Submerged (2005)
- Knife Edge (2008)
- Exodus to Shanghai (2015)
- Infamous 6 (2019)
- Underdogs Rising (TBA)

=== Television ===
- New York Undercover episode 3: Missing (1994)
- Extreme (1995) - pilot episode
- Two (1995) — pilot episode
- Pensacola: Wings of Gold episode: Broken Wings (1998)
- Martial Law (1998) — pilot episode
- Shoot Me! (2003) - pilot/series
