= Kate (TV series) =

British drama television series (1970–1972)

- Genre: Drama
- Starring: Phyllis Calvert; Elizabeth Burger; Penelope Keith; Jack Hedley; Preston Lockwood; Jasmina Hilton; Barry Quin; Jean Rimmer; Patrick Barr; Marcus Hammond; Anthony Sagar; Peter Sallis; Gareth Forwood
- Country of origin: United Kingdom
- Original language: English
- No. of series: 3
- No. of episodes: 38

Production
- Running time: 50 minutes
- Production company: Yorkshire Television

Original release
- Network: ITV
- Release: 6 January 1970 – 27 November 1972

Kate is a British drama television series that originally aired on ITV from 6 January 1970 to 29 November 1972, consisting of 38 episodes. It stars Phyllis Calvert in the role of an agony aunt who becomes personally drawn into the problems of the people who send letters to her. It was made by Yorkshire Television.

== Plot ==
An agony aunt named Kate Graham who lives in Chelsea, London, has a job working as a newspaper columnist, in which she gives advice to readers dealing with personal problems. Sometimes, however, she cannot help getting personally drawn into the lives of the people who write to her.

== Cast ==
- Phyllis Calvert as Kate Graham
- Elizabeth Burger as Ellen Burwood
- Penelope Keith as Wenda Padbury
- Jack Hedley as Donald Killearn
- Preston Lockwood as Mr. Winch
- Jasmina Hilton as Sally Hart
- Barry Quin as Tony Graham
- Jean Rimmer as June
- Patrick Barr as Paul Duncan
- Marcus Hammond as Stephen Graham
- Anthony Sagar as Tom Burwood
- Peter Sallis as Sammy Harrison
- Gareth Forwood as Peter Hemmings

== Episodes ==
The series ran for 3 series over 38 episodes from 6 January 1970 to 29 November 1972. All 38 episodes produced for the series are fully intact, although the series has never been released on any home media platforms. The whole series is available to watch at the British Film Institute.

=== Series 1 (1970) ===
1. "Dear Monica" (6 January 1970)
2. "A Little Learning" (13 January 1970)
3. "It's So Peaceful in the Country" (20 January 1970)
4. "Anything for a Quiet Life" (27 January 1970)
5. "Dance Little Baby, Dance Up High" (4 February 1970)
6. "One Good Turn" (10 February 1970)
7. "Say It with Flowers" (17 February 1970)
8. "A Good Spec" (24 February 1970)
9. "The Love of Two Women" (3 March 1970)
10. "The Man Who Broke the Rules" (10 March 1970)
11. "The King Is Dead" (17 March 1970)
12. "Take Over: Round One" (24 March 1970)
13. "Take Over: The Verdict" (31 March 1970)

=== Series 2 (1971) ===
1. "Ideally's a Big Word" (9 July 1971)
2. "A Child Is a Gift" (16 July 1971)
3. "From a Stranger" (23 July 1971)
4. "A Sort of Beauty" (30 July 1971)
5. "A Sort of Change" (6 August 1971)
6. "That Kind of Love" (13 August 1971)
7. "A Good Meddle" (20 August 1971)
8. "You Can't Condemn Them All" (27 August 1971)
9. "Call Her Sensitive" (3 September 1971)
10. "Call Her Serious" (10 September 1971)
11. "Good and Proper" (17 September 1971)
12. "A Human Weakness" (24 September 1971)
13. "The Great Female Rebellion" (1 October 1971)

=== Series 3 (1972) ===
1. "A Very Long Spoon" (11 September 1972)
2. "People Depend on You" (18 September 1972)
3. "A Man for All That" (25 September 1972)
4. "I Belong to Somebody" (2 October 1972)
5. "A Fact of Life" (9 October 1972)
6. "Second Time Round" (16 October 1972)
7. "A Step in the Right Direction" (23 October 1972)
8. "Moonlight and Roses" (30 October 1972)
9. "The Woman Behind the Man" (6 November 1972)
10. "Accidents Will Happen" (13 November 1972)
11. "A Nice Rest" (20 November 1972)
12. "Back to Square One" (27 November 1972)
