= Waxwork (film) =

1988 film by Anthony Hickox

- Theatrical film poster
- Directed by: Anthony Hickox
- Written by: Anthony Hickox
- Produced by: Staffan Ahrenberg
- Starring: Zach Galligan; Deborah Foreman; Michelle Johnson; David Warner; Dana Ashbrook; Miles O'Keeffe; Patrick Macnee; John Rhys-Davies
- Cinematography: Gerry Lively
- Edited by: Christopher Cibelli
- Music by: Roger Bellon
- Production companies: Palla Pictures Corp.; HB Filmrullen
- Distributed by: Vestron Pictures
- Release date: June 17, 1988
- Running time: 96 minutes
- Country: United States
- Language: English
- Budget: $3.5 million
- Box office: $808,114

Waxwork is a 1988 American comedy horror film written and directed by Anthony Hickox in his directorial film debut and starring Zach Galligan, Deborah Foreman, Michelle Johnson, David Warner, Dana Ashbrook, and Patrick Macnee. It is partially inspired by the 1924 German silent film Waxworks.

== Plot ==
In a small suburban town, a group of college students—Mark Loftmore, China Webster, Sarah Brightman, Gemma, James, and Tony—visit a mysterious wax museum. Their trip was caused by Sarah and China's earlier encounter with David Lincoln, a taciturn gentleman who claims to own the exhibit and extends them an invitation.

In the museum, they encounter several morbid displays, all of which contain stock characters from the horror genre. Tony and China unintentionally enter two separate pocket dimensions, as depicted by the displays, by crossing the exhibition barrier rope. Tony is at a cabin where a werewolf attacks him. A hunter and his son arrive and try to kill the creature. The son fails and is torn in half, while the hunter shoots the werewolf, then shoots Tony as he begins to transform. China is sent to a Gothic castle where vampires attack her, and Count Dracula turns her into a vampire. Two of the other students, Mark and Sarah, leave the museum unscathed. Later, Jonathan, a "college jock", arrives at the wax museum looking for China, but The Phantom of the Opera display gets his attention as David Lincoln walks him into the display. Mark goes to a pair of investigating police detectives. He and Inspector Roberts meet Lincoln as he lets Roberts investigate the museum. As Mark and Roberts leave, Mark recognizes Lincoln.

Later, Roberts realizes that some of the displays look like some of the other missing people, then comes back to the museum, cuts off a piece of China's face (revealing black tissue underneath), puts it in a bag, and walks into the mummy display; the mummy throws him in the tomb with another undead mummy and a snake. Later, Roberts's partner sneaks into the museum, and gets his neck broken by Junior, "a tall butler" Lincoln scolds for killing the partner.

Mark takes Sarah to the attic of his house, where he shows her an old newspaper detailing the murder of his grandfather (which was seen in the prologue); the only suspect was David Lincoln, his chief assistant, whose photograph closely resembles the museum owner. The two then consult the wheelchair user Sir Wilfred, a friend of Mark's grandfather, who explains how he and Mark's grandfather collected trinkets from "eighteen of the most evil people who ever lived" and that Lincoln stole the artifacts; Lincoln, having sold his soul to the Devil, wants to bring their previous owners to life by creating some wax effigies and feeding them the souls of victims, a concept taken from Haitian Vodou. Providing all eighteen with a victim would bring about the "voodoo end of the world, when the dead shall rise and consume all things".

On the advice of Sir Wilfred, Mark and Sarah enter the museum at night and douse it with gasoline. However, Sarah is lured into the display of the Marquis de Sade, and Mark is pushed into a zombie display by the museum's two butlers. Mark is approached by a horde of zombies, but finds that if he does not believe in the monsters, then they do not exist and cannot harm him. Mark finds his way out of the display and into the Marquis de Sade display, where he rescues Sarah, while the marquis vows revenge.

Despite Mark and Sarah's attempts to escape, Junior and Lincoln grab Mark and Sarah, pulling them out of sight as Gemma and James return. Gemma gets lured into the Marquis de Sade display, and James attempts to steal something from the zombie display; moments later, the bodies of James and Gemma reappear as wax figures, the displays completed with the figures and their victims reanimating as evil entities. Suddenly, Sir Wilfred and a huge group of armed men, along with Mark's butler Jenkins, arrive, and in the ensuing battle, several waxworks and slayers are killed, including Lincoln's butlers and Mark and Sarah's former friends, now evil. Jenkins consoles Mark by saying the China-vampire he killed was not his friend; it just looked like her. Mark duels with the Marquis de Sade in a sword fight, who is finally killed by Sarah with an axe.

The reunited couple are confronted by Lincoln, who dies getting shot by Sir Wilfred and falls in a vat of boiling wax. Sir Wilfred is decapitated by a werewolf as Sarah and Mark manage to escape the burning museum with their lives and begin to walk home, not noticing that the hand from the zombie display is scuttling away from the rubble.

== Cast ==
- Zach Galligan as Mark Loftmore
- Deborah Foreman as Sarah Brightman
- Michelle Johnson as China Webster
- Dana Ashbrook as Tony
- Eric Brown as James
- Clare Carey as Gemma
- David Warner as David Lincoln
- Patrick Macnee as Sir Wilfred
- Mihaly 'Michu' Meszaros as Hans
- Charles McCaughan as Inspector Roberts
- J. Kenneth Campbell as Marquis de Sade
- Miles O'Keeffe as Count Dracula
- John Rhys-Davies as Werewolf
- Jennifer Bassey as Mrs Loftmore
- Edward Ashley as Professor Sutherland
- Joe Baker as Jenkins

Some crew members appear in small roles:

- Anthony Hickox, director, as English prince
- Gerry Lively, director of photography, as Sir Wilfred's butler

== Production ==
The script for the film was written by Hickox in three days. Initially there were concerns that the film would be too similar to The Monster Squad, which came out the year before. Bob Keen was also brought on board to handle the visual effects.

The "eighteen most evil beings" used in the film are references to Gothic literature or horror cinema. These beings are the Marquis de Sade, a werewolf, Count Dracula, a golem, the Phantom of the Opera, The Mummy, a mad scientist who creates zombies, Frankenstein's monster, Jack the Ripper, The Invisible Man, a shaman, a witch, a snake man, a demonic baby, an axe murderer, an an alien, a body snatching alien pod, and Mr. Hyde.

== Release ==
The film was given a limited release in the United States by Vestron Pictures in June 1988. It grossed $808,114 at the box office. It was released by Vestron Video the same year on VHS in both R-rated and Unrated editions. The film's budget was $3.5 million.

The film was released on DVD in 2003 by Artisan Entertainment as a double feature with the sequel Waxwork II: Lost in Time and again in 2012 as part of an 8 horror film collection DVD.

Lionsgate released the film on Blu-ray for the first time along with its sequel, Waxwork II: Lost in Time, on October 18, 2016, as part of their Vestron Video Collector's Series line.

== Reception ==
Film review aggregator Rotten Tomatoes reports an approval rating of 60%, based on 10 reviews, and a rating average of 4.6/10. TV Guide gave the movie one out of five stars, stating that fans of gore will be pleased, but finding little else of worth. It did note the cast is made up of stars of other horror movies. John Stanley in the Creature Feature Guide had a higher opinion of the movie giving it 3.5 out of 5 stars. He cited the intriguing premise as one reason for the positive review.

== Other media ==
A comic adaption of the film was published by Blackthorne Publishing in November 1988, one as a black and white one-shot, and one as Waxwork 3-D Special # 1 (# 55 of Blackthorne's Blackthorne 3-D Series).

== Sequel ==
In 1992, the sequel Waxwork II: Lost in Time was released.
