= Knife Edge (film) =

2009 film by Anthony Hickox

- DVD cover
- Directed by: Anthony Hickox
- Written by: Robb Squire; Fiona Combe; Anthony Hickox
- Produced by: Fiona Combe; Pippa Cross; Janette Day
- Starring: Natalie Press; Tamsin Egerton; Hugh Bonneville
- Cinematography: Daniel Bronks
- Edited by: Daniel Hubbard
- Music by: Guy Farley
- Production companies: 120dB Films; Knife Edge Films; Lipsync Productions
- Distributed by: Seven Arts International
- Release date: 19 October 2009
- Running time: 90 minutes
- Country: United Kingdom
- Language: English

Knife Edge is a 2009 British thriller film directed by Anthony Hickox and starring Natalie Press, Hugh Bonneville and Tamsin Egerton. It was the last film of Joan Plowright before her retirement in 2014 and death in 2025.

== Plot ==
A successful Wall Street trader returns to Britain with her family, but her new home in the countryside contains a disturbing secret. Her understanding of this secret is complicated by her husbands' difficulties and losing his job. In trying to hide this, he uses gaslighting to trick her into believing she is going insane.

Her son Thomas's new friend Tobias, has the same name as the little boy who was murdered in the house 30 years ago. This difficult and clever doubling blurs what is truth and what is a delusion.

== Cast ==
- Joan Plowright as Marjorie
- Hugh Bonneville as Charles Pollock
- Tamsin Egerton as Flora
- Natalie Press as Emma
- Jamie Harris as Derek
- Lorcan O'Toole as Andrew
- Nina Muschallik as Pauline
- Mark Holden as Alfred
- Jennifer Munby as Miss Prescott
- Matthieu Boujenah as Henri
- Peter Rnic as the villain in court
- Karen Ferrari as Jocelyn
- Tim Wade as Jack – Stock Broker
- Miles Ronayne as Thomas
- Lee MacDougall as Young Pollock

== Production ==
Anthony Hickox directed the thriller and was produced by Fiona Combe, Pippa Cross and Janette Day. It was produced by Seven Arts Films and is the return of Hickox to the horror genre. Hickox shot the film in London and the Home Counties, England, UK. The film was based on a screenplay from Fiona Combe, Anthony Hickox and Robb Squire.

== Release ==
The film was released on 19 October 2009 in the UK over Scanbox Entertainment and was set for a US release on 20 April 2010.

== Soundtrack ==
The score was composed by Sphere Studios founder Guy Farley.
