= Warlock: The Armageddon =

1993 film by Anthony Hickox

- Theatrical release poster
- Directed by: Anthony Hickox
- Written by: Kevin Rock
- Produced by: Peter Abrams; Robert L. Levy
- Starring: Julian Sands; Chris Young; Paula Marshall; Joanna Pacula
- Cinematography: Gerry Lively
- Edited by: Christopher Cibelli; James D.R. Hickox
- Music by: Mark McKenzie
- Distributed by: Trimark Pictures; Tapestry Films
- Release date: September 24, 1993
- Running time: 98 minutes
- Country: United States
- Language: English
- Budget: $3-6.5 million
- Box office: $3.9 million (US)

Warlock: The Armageddon is a 1993 American supernatural horror film directed by Anthony Hickox and produced by Peter Abrams. It is a sequel in name only to the 1989 film Warlock and stars Julian Sands, who returned in the title role as a warlock who attempts to free Satan from Hell.

== Plot ==
In the distant past, Druids have stopped the rise of Satan's son using six magical rune stones that create light to vanquish the darkness. While the Druids perform a ritual upon a woman Satan has selected, they are attacked by Christians who feel their work is Satanic. Most of the Druids die and the rune stones are scattered.

In the present, Kenny Travis and Samantha Ellison, a young man and woman, are in love but are having relationship issues. Their parents are Druids; while Samantha's father, Ted Ellison, is a priest and has neglected his responsibilities as a Druid, Kenny's father, Will Travis, kills Kenny so he can rise again with the aid of Druid magic to become a Druid warrior.

Elsewhere, Amanda Sloan, a young woman, has possession of one of the rune stones due to it being passed down through her family. Amanda wears the stone to impress her date, but as she looks out her kitchen window at the lunar eclipse, she rapidly becomes pregnant and gives birth to the Warlock, Satan's son. After the Warlock is reborn, he kills Amanda and then communicates with his father Satan. Using Amanda as a conduit, Satan tells the Warlock to find the other five rune stones. These have the power to summon him to Earth, but he has precisely six days to do this. The Warlock peels the flesh from Amanda's stomach and makes it into a map, enabling him to track the other runes.

Kenny is destined to be a Druid warrior. He learns how to use his powers, and his girlfriend Samantha joins him. They suffer persecution from the villagers but are protected by Ted. Meanwhile, the Warlock finds the other rune stones to raise Satan from his prison to rule the world, murdering various people along the way.

Kenny and Samantha, who is wearing the final rune stone, fight the Warlock, but he defeats and imprisons them and uses the runes to open a portal to Hell. As Satan rises, Kenny and Samantha use their powers to turn on the lights of a nearby truck. The Warlock screams in terror as he is killed and Satan is sent back to Hell.

== Cast ==
- Julian Sands as The Warlock
- Chris Young as Kenny Travis
- Paula Marshall as Samantha Ellison
- Joanna Pacula as Paula Dare
- Steve Kahan as Will Travis
- R. G. Armstrong as Franks
- Charles Hallahan as Ethan Larson
- Bruce Glover as Ted Ellison
- Davis Gaines as Nathan Sinclair
- Dawn Ann Billings as Amanda Sloan
- Zach Galligan as Douglas
- Michu Meszaros as Augusto
- Anthony Hickox as Dark Leader
- Brent Bolthouse as Druid Leader

== Soundtrack ==
Warlock: The Armageddon

Studio album by Mark McKenzie
- Released: September 24, 1993
- Genres: Classical, Stage & Screen
- Label: Intrada Records MAF 7049D

The soundtrack was composed and conducted by Mark McKenzie. A soundtrack album was released on September 24, 1993, via Intrada Records label.

== Reception ==
Leonard Klady of Variety wrote that the film, though not narratively connected to Warlock, will satisfy fans of that film. Compared to Sands, Klady called the rest of the cast bland. Of Sands, he wrote, "Chewing up the landscape with great relish, Sands almost erases all thought of his colorless adversaries." Kevin Thomas of the Los Angeles Times called it "too dreary to play even as camp".
