= Howard Griffiths (screenwriter) =

Howard Griffiths (8 October 1935 – 24 October 1999) was a screen and television writer born in Wales who wrote Licensed to Kill and many Australian television shows.

== Biography ==
Born in Swansea, Griffiths earned a scholarship to the University of Oxford with the highest entry results in Wales. He studied Classics at Trinity College, Oxford.

Griffiths did his National Service in the Royal Air Force as a Russian linguist with RAF Intelligence in West Germany listening to Soviet Air Force pilots radio transmissions. Griffiths recalled one Russian pilot wishing "A happy Christmas to our British listeners!"

After leaving the military he edited a personnel magazine for Business Publications London, where he met his future wife, who was Australian. After his marriage he worked for the World Book Encyclopedia, which transferred him to Sydney, Australia to develop an Australian version of the encyclopedia.

Griffith's first screenplay was Licensed to Kill (1965). After emigrating to Australia, he wrote and story edited extensively for Australian television series, such as the spy series Hunter (1967), and police shows Division 4, Homicide, and Blue Heelers. In 1972, he wrote a play for the anthology series A Time for Love titled "Birds of a Feather".

From 1975 to 1980 Griffiths was a script editor with the Australian Broadcasting Commission and received AWGIE Awards for episodes of Frank Hardy's Power Without Glory and Truckies. Griffith also co-wrote Becca (1988), an Australian-Welsh television co-production of an 1840s Welshman transported to Australia, as well as writing the teleplay to Outbreak of Love from the novel by Martin Boyd.

In addition to writing, Griffiths interviewed many survivors of RAF Bomber Command for the 1987 ABC documentary Wings of the Storm and donated all his footage to the Australian War Memorial.

Griffiths also held teaching positions with the Australian Film, Television and Radio School in Sydney and the Victorian College of the Arts and was a Victorian delegate of the Australian Writers Guild.
