= The Enigma Files =

1980 British TV police procedural series

- Opening titles
- Genre: Police procedural
- Starring: Tom Adams; Sharon Maughan; Carole Nimmons; Duggie Brown
- Theme music composer: Anthony Isaac
- Country of origin: United Kingdom
- Original language: English
- No. of series: 1
- No. of episodes: 15

Production
- Production location: London
- Running time: 50 minutes

Original release
- Network: BBC2
- Release: 15 April 1980

The Enigma Files is a British television police procedural that ran for one series of fifteen episodes in 1980.

== Plot summary ==
The series was a police procedural, written by Derek Ingrey, about a police officer who has been sidelined from regular duties and, having been placed in charge of a records and evidence unit, has begun to specialise in investigating unsolved crimes.

Although run as a single batch of 15 episodes, it's possible that the series was shot in two batches, accounting for the cast change between episodes eight and nine, and the format shift that dropped Lewis's home life and daughter. In the last episode it is established that Liz Lewis is now in Heidellberg.

== Regular cast and characters ==
- Tom Adams as Detective Chief Inspector Nick Lewis
- Sharon Maughan as Kate Burton, the unit administrator (first eight episodes only)
- Carole Nimmons as Sue Maxwell, the unit administrator (last seven episodes only)
- Duggie Brown as Phil Strong, a laboratory technician

== Video release ==
There are no known releases on video tape or DVD.

== Other media ==
A tie-in book of the series, written by Christine Sparks, was published by the BBC in June 1980 (ISBN 0563177705 / ISBN 978-0-563-17770-8).
