= Licensed to Kill (1965 film) =

1965 British film by Lindsay Shonteff

- original British film poster
- Directed by: Lindsay Shonteff
- Written by: Lindsay Shonteff; Howard Griffiths
- Produced by: James Ward; Alistair Films
- Starring: Tom Adams; Karel Stepanek; Veronica Hurst; Peter Bull; John Arnatt
- Cinematography: Terry Maher
- Edited by: Ron Pope
- Music by: Herbert Chappell
- Distributed by: Embassy Pictures
- Release date: July 1965
- Running time: 96 minutes
- Country: United Kingdom
- Language: English
- Box office: $1.2 million (est. US/ Canada rentals)

Licensed to Kill is an Eastmancolor 1965 superspy imitation James Bond film starring Tom Adams as British secret agent Charles Vine. It was directed and co-written by Lindsay Shonteff. Producer Joseph E. Levine picked it up for American and worldwide distribution and reedited it under the title The Second Best Secret Agent in the Whole Wide World.

The theme song for the American version, composed by Sammy Cahn and Jimmy Van Heusen and performed by Sammy Davis Jr., is used in the 2011 film drama Tinker Tailor Soldier Spy.

== Plot ==
Facing numerous assassination attempts, a Swedish scientist who has invented an anti-gravity device and his assistant seek to provide the invention to the United Kingdom. With James Bond unavailable, H.M. Government provides Agent Charles Vine, a former mathematician, as a bodyguard and assassin.

== Cast ==
- Tom Adams as Charles Vine
- Karel Stepanek as Henrik Jacobsen
- Peter Bull as Masterman
- John Arnatt as Rockwell
- Francis de Wolff as Walter Pickering
- Felix Felton as Tetchnikov
- Veronica Hurst as Julia Lindberg
- Judy Huxtable as Computer Center Girl
- Carol Blake as Crossword Puzzle Girl
- Claire Gordon as Hospital Doctor
- Denis Holmes as Maltby
- Gary Hope as "Army Officer"
- Billy Milton as Wilson
- Oliver MacGreevy as First Russian Commissar
- George Pastell as Second Russian Commissar
- Tony Wall as Sadistikov
- Stuart Saunders as Police Inspector
- Robert Marsden as August Jacobsen
- Paul Tann as Vladimir Sheehee

== Production ==
Based on the success of the film, Columbia Pictures offered director Shonteff a five-picture contract, but they disagreed over conditions.

Welsh Trinity College, Oxford graduate and former RAF Intelligence Howard Griffiths emigrated to Australia where he wrote extensively for Australian television series such as the spy series Hunter (1967), and police shows Division 4, Homicide, and Blue Heelers.

== U.S. release ==
1966 US release poster

Joseph E. Levine had great financial success after cheaply purchasing an Italian film called Hercules and releasing it in America with a massive publicity campaign/ He decided to do the same with Licensed to Kill. However, the American release reedited the film by having the opening assassination performed by a mother pulling a Sten gun out of her pram of twins being changed to a pre-credit scene. Levine engaged songwriters Sammy Cahn and Jimmy Van Heusen to write a title song performed by Sammy Davis Jr and arranged and conducted by Claus Ogerman over the credits with the new title. The American release then eliminated scenes of Francis de Wolff talking to John Arnatt about seeking Bond for the assignment, and of Vine in bed with a girl and a crossword puzzle giving double entendre clues. The American release also eliminates much of the dialogue about the anti-gravity device, called "Regrav", which makes the denouement of the film less comprehensible.

The American publicity for the film echoed the "Number 2, but tries harder" advertising of the Avis Rent a Car System prevalent at the time. Levine launched a November 1965 nationwide 100 word essay contest to be titled "the most unforgettable second-best secret agent I have known".

== Reception ==
Alan Burton in Historical Dictionary of British Spy Fiction wrote positively of the film, describing it as "a cut-price James Bond picture with plenty of thrills and some wit", and wrote of Tom Adams as Charles Vine as doing "a passable imitation of Sean Connery".

== Sequels ==
What Eon Productions's reaction was to the blatant imitation is not known, but Shonteff was missing from the two Vine sequels starring Tom Adams:

- Where the Bullets Fly (1966) (directed by Warwick Films and Hammer Films director John Gilling) that was also released by Embassy Films.
- Somebody's Stolen Our Russian Spy/O.K. Yevtushenko (1967) a film shot in Spain instead of the usual UK location, that languished in a film laboratory until 1976.

Shonteff later made three spy films with the hero named "Charles Bind". In the first, his boss is also named Rockwell:

- Number One of the Secret Service (1977) starring Nicky Henson.
- Licensed to Love and Kill aka The Man from S.E.X. (1979) starring Gareth Hunt.
- Number One Gun (1980) starring Michael Howe.
