= Nearly a Nasty Accident =

1961 British film by Don Chaffey

- UK theatrical release poster
- Directed by: Don Chaffey
- Written by: Jack Davies; Hugh Woodhouse play Touch Wood by David Stringer; David Carr
- Produced by: Bertram Ostrer
- Starring: Jimmy Edwards; Kenneth Connor; Shirley Eaton; Eric Barker
- Cinematography: Paul Beeson
- Edited by: Bill Lenny
- Music by: Ken Jones
- Production companies: British Lion Films; Bertram Ostrer Productions; Marlow Films Ltd.
- Distributed by: Britannia Films (UK)
- Release dates: May 1961 (London); 28 March 1962 (Boston); 27 June 1962 (New York City)
- Running time: 86 minutes
- Country: United Kingdom
- Language: English

Nearly a Nasty Accident is a 1961 British comedy film directed by Don Chaffey and starring Jimmy Edwards, Kenneth Connor, Shirley Eaton and Eric Barker.

The screenplay was by Jack Davies and Hugh Woodhouse, based on the 1958 BBC TV Sunday-Night Theatre play Touch Wood by David Stringer and David Carr.

== Plot ==
Alexander Wood is a cheerful, well-intentioned and mechanically minded aircraftman. He is also dangerously accident-prone. Always on the lookout for things to fix and improve, he constantly creates chaos and arouses the anger of the airbase commander, the promotion-seeking Group Captain Kingsley. Nevertheless Wood wins the heart of Corporal Jean Briggs.

== Cast ==
- Jimmy Edwards as Group Captain Kingsley
- Kenneth Connor as AC 2 Alexander Wood
- Shirley Eaton as Corporal Jean Briggs
- Eric Barker as Air Minister
- Jon Pertwee as General Birkinshaw
- Ronnie Stevens as Flight Lieutenant Pocock
- Richard Wattis as Wagstaffe
- Joyce Carey as Lady Trowborough
- Peter Jones as Flight Lieutenant Winters
- Terry Scott as Sam Stokes
- Charlotte Mitchell as Miss Chamberlain
- Jack Watling as Flight Lieutenant Grogan
- Joe Baker as Watkins
- Jack Douglas as Balmer
- Cyril Chamberlain as Warrant Officer Breech
- John Forrest as Flight Lieutenant Bunthorpe
- Vincent Ball as Sergeant at Crybwyth
- Harold Goodwin as aircraft mechanic

== Production ==
The film was one of several comedies Shirley Eaton made around this time.

== Critical response ==
The Monthly Film Bulletin wrote: "An air of desperation pervades the homely humours of this stereotype farce, in which Eric Barker and Richard Wattis contribute their standard Whitehall representations, and Jimmy Edwards explodes and stutters and wields his swagger-stick like a cane. Kenneth Connor, wrecking aircraft, flooding South Wales and generally costing the Air Ministry five million pounds in damages, shoulders the main burden of the sub-standard script. At his best, he manages to provide an echo of the late George Formby's gift for this kind of riotous-pathetic "'erk" portrayal; at his worst, he merely parodies Chaplin's little man."

The Radio Times Guide to Films gave the film 3/5 stars, writing: "Jimmy Edwards teams with Kenneth Connor for this old-fashioned blend of slapstick and bluster. Although Edwards, his handlebar moustache bristling with indignation, is the nominal star as the RAF officer whose cushy lifestyle is shattered by the arrival of an accident prone mechanic, it's Connor's talent for timidity and catastrophe that makes this catalogue of disasters so amusing, Don Chaffey directs with undue fuss, and there's practised support from some stalwart players."

Leslie Halliwell said: "Familiar faces just about save from disaster this underscripted comedy for indulgent audiences."

The New York Times called the film "essentially a one-joke comedy hanging on the thinnest of plots."

TV Guide said "Connor is a soldier who is obsessed with repairing things and is fascinated with anything mechanical, in this cute British comedy".
