= Marcus Hammond =

English actor (born 1938)

- Born: John Hammond; 1938 (age 87–88)
- Occupation: Actor
- Notable work: Z-Cars

Marcus Hammond (born 1938) is an English actor who was active in the 1960s and 1970s, playing the role of Antodus in the 1963 Doctor Who serial The Daleks, as well as recurring roles in Z-Cars as PC Taylor and Kate as Stephen Graham. He also appeared in the 1966 films Where the Bullets Fly, and the Hammer film The Plague of the Zombies as Tom Martinus.

Under his real name John Hammond, during the 1990s, he also ran "The Little Gallery" in Porlock Weir, Somerset, UK, where he sold his paintings and those of other local artists.

== Filmography ==
=== Film ===
Year	Title	Role	Notes
1966	The Plague of the Zombies	Tom Martinus	
1966	Where the Bullets Fly	O'Neil	

=== Television ===
Year	Title	Role	Notes
1963	No Cloak - No Dagger	Police cadet	Season 1
1963 1964 1971	Armchair Theatre	Tea Boy Frank Detective Con. North	Season 4 (2 episodes) Season 13, episode 10: "Man Charged"
1964	Doctor Who	Antodus	Season 1: (4 episodes)
1964	Detective	PC Harris	Season 1, episode 11: "Death in Ecstacy"
1964- 1965	Z-Cars	PC Taylor	Season 4: (20 episodes)
1964 1965	Love Story	Young man George	Season 2, episode 8: "A Girl Like Me" Season 3, episode 15: "The Girl Opposite"
1965	This Year's Girl	Stan	TV movie
1965 1966	ITV Play of the Week	Stan Unknown	Season 11: (2 episodes)
1966	Theatre 625	George	Season 3, episode 35: "How to Get Rid of Your Husband"
1968	Journey to the Unknown	2nd Youth	Season 1, episode 10: "Eve"
1969	Fraud Squad	Hammond	Season 1, episode 5: "All Claims Paid For"
1969	ITV Playhouse	Unknown	Season 3, episode 12: "Suspect"
1970	Kate	Stephen Graham	Season 1: (6 episodes)
1971	Paul Temple	Richard Tubby	Season 3, episode 5: "Death for Divers' Reasons"
