= The Daredevil Men =

1972 British film by John Sealey

- Original film poster
- Directed by: John Sealey
- Written by: John Sealey
- Starring: Tom Adams
- Production company: Wendon films
- Release date: 1972
- Running time: approx. 20 min.
- Country: UK
- Language: English

The Daredevil Men is a 1972 British short subject written and directed by John Sealey and featuring Tom Adams. It details the activities of stunt performers and stunt arrangers.

== Plot ==
The film demonstrates how action scenes in a film are created using stunt performers, editing and special effects. The action includes unarmed combat, gunfights, the pyrotechnics of an electrocution scene, and a car and motorcycle chase.

== Cast ==
- Tom Adams
- Derek Ware
- Sue Crosland
- Jack Cooper
- Paddy Ryan
- Terry Walsh
