= Blast (2004 film) =

2004 film by Anthony Hickox

- Theatrical release poster
- Directed by: Anthony Hickox
- Screenplay by: Steven E. de Souza
- Based on: Operation Noah by Horst Freund
- Produced by: Brad Krevoy; David Lancaster; Klaus Rettig; Werner Possardt; Gerhard Schmidt; David Wicht
- Starring: Eddie Griffin; Vivica A. Fox; Breckin Meyer; Joel Pollak; Vinnie Jones
- Music by: Danny Saber
- Distributed by: DEJ Productions
- Release dates: May 16, 2004 (France); July 19, 2005 (United States)
- Running time: 92 minutes
- Countries: United States; South Africa; Germany
- Language: English

Blast is a 2004 action film directed by Anthony Hickox and starring Eddie Griffin, Vinnie Jones, Breckin Meyer, and Vivica A. Fox. It was written by Steven E. de Souza. The film is a remake of the German television film Operation Noah (1998).

== Plot ==
A terrorist, Michael Kittredge (Vinnie Jones), posing as an environmentalist protester leads a team of highly skilled mercenaries to take control of an oil rig off the coast of California, intending to detonate an electromagnetic bomb over the United States, striking a sort of "new Pearl Harbor" attack on behalf of enemies to the nation. What Kittredge didn't count on is a tugboat captain, Lamont Dixon (Eddie Griffin), who survives an attack on his ship, and is soon recruited by an FBI agent (Vivica A. Fox) to infiltrate the oil rig and procure information about their plans, and if possible, stop them. In the process, Dixon meets an eager computer expert (Breckin Meyer) aboard the oil rig who helps Dixon even as he gets on his nerves and Lamont suspects he can't really trust him.

== Cast ==
- Eddie Griffin as Lamont Dixon
- Breckin Meyer as Jamal
- Vivica A. Fox as Agent Reed
- Vinnie Jones as Michael Kittridge
- Shaggy as Mace
- Tiny Lister as Smiley
- Nadine Velazquez as Luna
- Hannes Jaenicke as CEO Heller
- Jordan Preaster as Andrew Cardway
