= The Fighting Prince of Donegal =

1966 film by Michael O'Herlihy

- Theatrical release poster
- Directed by: Michael O'Herlihy
- Written by: Robert Westerby; Robert T. Reilly
- Produced by: Walt Disney
- Starring: Peter McEnery; Susan Hampshire; Tom Adams
- Cinematography: Arthur Ibbetson
- Edited by: Peter Boita
- Music by: George Bruns
- Production company: Walt Disney Productions
- Distributed by: Buena Vista Distribution
- Release date: October 1, 1966
- Running time: 110 minutes
- Countries: United Kingdom; United States
- Language: English

The Fighting Prince of Donegal is a 1966 adventure film starring Peter McEnery and Susan Hampshire, based on the novel Red Hugh: Prince of Donegal by Robert T. Reilly. It was released by the Buena Vista Distribution Company. The film was shot entirely at and near Pinewood Studios in Buckinghamshire.

== Plot ==
Set in the late 1580s, the film very loosely follows the real-life exploits of the 16th-century Irish prince Hugh Roe "Red Hugh" O'Donnell. The story begins when Hugh's father, the Chief of the Name, dies, leaving his son as Chief of Clan O'Donnell. With his accession to the throne, an Irish prophecy is seemingly fulfilled which promises independence from Elizabethan and English rule. In response, the Queen's Lord Lieutenant abducts and imprisons him in Dublin Castle as a hostage for the Clan's good behavior. After a daring escape, he flies across Ireland with the sons of Hugh Roe O'Neill.

The O'Donnell lords see this occurrence as the opportunity to strike back at the foreigners by force, but Hugh convinces them the right plan is to band together with the other clans of the island, and bargain for their freedom from a position of strength. As he prepares for battle, O'Donnell also courts the beautiful Kathleen McSweeney, to further augment the clans of Ireland.

== Cast ==
- Peter McEnery as Hugh O'Donnell
- Susan Hampshire as Kathleen McSweeney
- Andrew Keir as Lord McSweeney
- Tom Adams as Henry O'Neill
- Gordon Jackson as Captain Leeds
- Norman Wooland as Sir John Perrott
- Richard Leech as Phelim O'Toole
- Peter Jeffrey as Sergeant
- Marie Kean as Lady Ineen O'Donnell
- Bill Owen as Officer Powell
- Maurice Roëves as Martin
- Donal McCann as Sean O'Toole

== Historical accuracy ==
Hugh O'Neill was renamed Henry O'Neill for the film. It is generally believed that O'Neill had an equal, if not more important, role in the establishment of the Irish confederacy. O'Donnell's girlfriend in the film, Kathleen McSweeney, did not exist. In reality he was betrothed to Hugh O'Neill's daughter Róisín (Rose) by 1587, and they married in December 1592. O'Donnell's father dies at the beginning of the film, allowing his son to succeed him. In reality he abdicated in favour of O'Donnell in April 1592 and died in 1600 during his retirement.

== Reception ==
Critical reception was split on Fighting Prince between those who thought it clichéd and oversimplified (Variety and Time) and those who accepted it as unpretentious fun (the New York Herald Tribune and The New York Times).

The film did not do well at the box office.

== Comic book adaption ==
- Gold Key: Walt Disney Presents The Fighting Prince of Donegal (January 1967)

== Home media ==
The Fighting Prince Of Donegal was released on VHS in October 1986. It was later subsequently released in DVD format as a Disney Movie Club Exclusive on February 13, 2007.

== See also ==
- List of American films of 1966
- Hugh Roe O'Donnell
- Nine Years' War (Ireland)
