= Invasion of Privacy (film) =

- Directed by: Anthony Hickox
- Screenplay by: Larry Cohen
- Produced by: Carsten Lorenz; Hanno Huth
- Starring: Johnathon Schaech; Mili Avital; Naomi Campbell
- Cinematography: Peter Wunstorf
- Edited by: Dana Congdon
- Music by: Anthony Marinelli
- Release date: November 15, 1996
- Running time: 91 minutes
- Country: United States

Invasion of Privacy is a 1996 American thriller film directed by Anthony Hickox and starring Johnathon Schaech, Mili Avital and Naomi Campbell.

== Cast ==
- Mili Avital as Theresa Barnes
- Johnathon Schaech as Josh Taylor
- Naomi Campbell as Cindy Carmichael
- David Keith as Sgt. Rutherford
- Tom Wright as Devereux
- R. G. Armstrong as Mr. Logan
- Charlotte Rampling as Deidre Stiles
- Scott Wilkinson as Doctor Shuman
- Susan Dolan Stevens as Lt. Gibbons

== Soundtrack ==
- "I'll never leave you lonely at night" (performed by Eddie Chacon)
- "Welcome to love - Now go home" (performed by Danielle Brisebois)
- Nocturne in B-flat minor, Op. 9, No. 1 (Frédéric Chopin)
- Symphony No. 1 (Wolfgang Amadeus Mozart)
- Carmen, "La fleur que tu m'avais jetée..." (Georges Bizet)
