= Fire Crackers =

British TV sitcom (1964–1965)

- Written by: Fred Robinson; John Singer; John Warren
- Directed by: Josephine Douglas
- Starring: Alfred Marks; Joe Baker; Sydney Bromley; Ronnie Brody; Norman Chappell
- Country of origin: United Kingdom
- Original language: English
- No. of series: 2
- No. of episodes: 13

Production
- Producer: Alan Tarrant
- Running time: 30m per episode
- Production company: ATV

Original release
- Release: 29 August 1964 – 20 February 1965

Fire Crackers is a British television sitcom set in the Croppers End Fire Station, with its 60-year-old fire engine Bessie. It aired from 29 August 1964 to 20 February 1965.

Two series were produced, for a total of 13 episodes. The series was produced by Associated Television (ATV), and aired on ITV. Unlike many British series of the 1960s, the series survives intact in the archives.

== Cast ==
- Alfred Marks as Charlie, Fire Chief
- Joe Baker as Jumbo
- Sydney Bromley as Whiskers
- Ronnie Brody as Loverboy
- Norman Chappell as Leading Fireman Piggott
- Martin Boddey as Station Officer Blazer
- Clive Elliott as Tadpole
- Cardew Robinson as Hairpin
- John Arnatt as Station Officer Blazer
- Colin Douglas as George
- Maureen Toal as Rosie
- Liz Fraser as Mary Medway

== Episodes ==
=== Series 1 ===
- "Semi Detached" (aired 29 August 1964)
- "Wanted: One Fire" (aired 5 September 1964)
- "Objective Case" (aired 12 September 1964)
- "Fire Belle for Five" (aired 19 September 1964)
- "Blue Blooded Buddy" (aired 26 September 1964)
- "Power Crazy" (aired 3 October 1964)

=== Series 2 ===
- "The Business as Usual" (aired 9 January 1965)
- "Strictly for the Birds" (aired 16 January 1965)
- "Pie in the Sky" (aired 23 January 1965)
- "Slap on the Map" (aired 30 January 1965)
- "The Willie Waghorn Story" (aired 6 February 1965)
- "Beautiful Dreamer" (aired 13 February 1965)
- "Saved by the Bell" (aired 20 February 1965)
