= Young England (play) =

Young England was a patriotic melodrama written by Walter Reynolds. It ran for 278 performances in the West End in 1934. The play attracted a cult following, transferring from the Victoria Palace Theatre to the Kingsway Theatre and then to Daly's Theatre.

Reynolds was 83 at the time he wrote Young England, and was the owner of several theatres. It was popular with audiences due to its unintentional humour. The show was panned by critics; TIME magazine wrote that they had described it as "the worst show that had opened in London in 20 years". The Times described the play as a "pretty melodrama" that was "betrayed by shame-faced acting" in a September 1934 review, but by March of the following year noted that the "audience are definitely over-rehearsed" speaking the performers lines in "anticipation of their cues".

The plot concerns the machinations of Major Carlingford, a 'betrayer of women, shady promoter and sanctimonious humbug' who conspires with his son to sabotage the plans of a young scoutmaster, parliamentary candidate and councillor who wants to improve the River Thames at Charing Cross. The humorous writer Stephen Pile described it as a 'serious work describing the triumph of good over evil and the Boy Scout movement'.

Stephen Pile included it as the 'Worst West End Play' in his Book of Heroic Failure.

In a December 1939 article TIME magazine wrote that "London's bright boys just had to see what the worst show in 20 years looked like. They screamed with laughter at its superpatriotic goings-on, involving gallant officers, dastardly villains, prostitutes, Boy Scouts, Girl Guides, taints of illegitimacy, stolen papers, stolen cash, the Union Jack". Reynolds would remonstrate with misbehaving members of the audience during performances of the play.

== Original cast ==
- Disabled Soldier – Bruce Moir
- Tommy – Albert Bassett
- 'Enry – William Hallett
- Sam – Arnold English
- Ronald Spencer – Cyril Aiken
- Ikey, Bailiff – E. Somerset
- Izzy – Percy Cahill
- Dr. Captain Frank Inglehurst V.C. – Gerald Case
- Jackson – Reginald Hartley
- Jabez Hawk (father) – John Oxford/Guy Middleton
- Jabez Hawk (son) – Guy Middleton
- Alderman Young – Sydney Compton
- Councillor Wild, Superintendent of Police – Nicholas Pymm
- Councillor, Scoutmaster, Hope Ravenscroft – Patrick Ludlow
- Goggins – Bert Randall
- Jack Norman – Reginald Andrews
- Rover Scout, Lord Headingly – Barry Storri
- Salvation Army Lass – Betty Dorian
- Policewoman – Violet Douglas
- Mrs Jones – Josie Hammersley
- Mrs Maloney – Daisy Maynard
- Sophie – Elsie Adams
- Mrs Brown – Dorothy Garth
- Mrs. Ravenscroft – Vivian O'Connor
- Feeble Old Woman – Jessica Black
- Louise Palmer – Barbara Savage
- Margaret Thursby – Dorothy Pringle
- Liza Jenkins – Mary Blackmore
- Girl – Cecily Mazur
- Mrs Hurst, Mrs Jackson – Irene Graham
- Edith Stanley – Betty Aubery
- Mrs Stanley – Zita Ponder
- Miss Montgomery – Winifred Wright
- Mrs Hawk – Mina Greene
- Mary Ellen – Diana Moore
- Lady Mary Headingly – Sylvia Allen
- Duchess of Headingly – Josset Legh
