= Somebody's Stolen Our Russian Spy =

1976 Spanish film by José Luis Madrid

- Original British film poster by Tom Beauvais
- Directed by: José Luis Madrid
- Written by: Michael Pittock; José Luis Madrid
- Produced by: José Luis Madrid; James Ward
- Starring: Tom Adams; Diana Lorys
- Cinematography: Raúl Artigot
- Music by: Ángel Arteaga
- Production companies: Puck Films; Andorra Films
- Distributed by: Tigon British Film Productions
- Release date: 1976
- Running time: 108 minutes
- Country: Spain
- Language: English

Somebody's Stolen Our Russian Spy or O.K. Yevtushenko (the film shot the same year as O.K. Connery) is a 1967 Spanish/British international co-production Eurospy film shot in Spain and Portugal. The film was co-produced by James Ward and directed, co-written and co-produced by José Luis Madrid. The film stars Tom Adams in his third and final appearance as British secret agent Charles Vine. The film was shot in Spain instead of the usual UK location. When Embassy Pictures chose not to release it, the film languished in a film laboratory until 1976.

== Plot ==
In Mallorca's sealine, top Soviet Agent Colonel Yevtushenko is kidnapped off a yacht by the Albanian Secret Service and a Red Chinese agent, being then taken to Barcelona. Their scheme is to obtain information out of him, then kill him blaming the British Secret Service. The U.K. sends in Charles Vine from Portugal, but Vine is captured and taken to the People's Socialist Republic of Albania along with Yevtushenko.

== Cast ==
- Tom Adams as Charles Vine
- Barta Barri as Colonel Yevtushenko
- Tim Barrett as Major Kovacs
- Diana Lorys as Galina Samarav
- Mary Paz Pondal as Sara
- Antonio Molino Rojo as Gen. Borodin
- María Silva as Pandora Loz
- Eric Chapman as Potts
- Tito García as Captain Milhavikah
- José Riesgo as Col. Stenhoff
- Gene Reyes as Ly Chee
- José María Labernié as Muffin-Wells
- Antonio Jiménez Escribano as Rockwell
