= Waxwork II: Lost in Time =

1992 American film by Anthony Hickox

- Directed by: Anthony Hickox
- Written by: Anthony Hickox
- Produced by: Nancy Paloian
- Starring: Zach Galligan; Alexander Godunov; Monika Schnarre; Martin Kemp; Bruce Campbell
- Cinematography: Gerry Lively
- Edited by: Christopher Cibelli
- Music by: Steve Schiff
- Distributed by: Electric Pictures
- Release dates: March 26, 1992 (Philippines); June 16, 1992 (US)
- Running time: 104 minutes
- Country: United States
- Language: English

Waxwork II: Lost in Time is a 1992 American dark fantasy comedy film written and directed by Anthony Hickox. It is a sequel to the 1988 horror film Waxwork. The film premiered in the Philippines on March 26, 1992, while it was given a direct-to-video release in the United States on June 16, 1992.

== Plot ==
Beginning where the previous film left off, Mark Loftmore and Sarah Brightman leave the burning waxwork. They board a taxi but the severed hand from the zombie exhibit also escapes, follows Sarah home, and kills her stepfather with a hammer. Shortly after, Sarah is on trial for the murder and, much to the dismay of her defense attorney, tells the skeptical jury about what happened at the waxwork. Mark rashly tries to corroborate her story from the spectators gallery but is removed from the courthouse.

Desperate to help their situation, the two visit the late Sir Wilfred's home, where they find a film reel of Sir Wilfred speaking of his and Mark's grandfather's adventures and of the supernatural artifacts they collected together. A secret switch in Sir Wilfred's chessboard opens a door to a room full of objects where Mark and Sarah find a small compass-like device. The device is revealed to be Solomon's Locket, which was used by both light and dark angels to travel through another universe, called Kartagra. According to Sir Wilfred, the many worlds of Kartagra comprise the plane where the cosmic eternal battles between good and evil occur. Each victory or failure is reflected in the real world as peace or natural disasters. Most but not all of these worlds consist of fictional stories that have become realities, including Frankenstein, The Haunting, Alien, Godzilla, Nosferatu, and Dawn of the Dead, among others. Much like the waxwork exhibits, whenever Mark and Sarah arrive in a new world they take on the persona of characters in those stories, sometimes having their personalities taken over by those characters until they regain their senses. Those who remain in Kartagra to take up the fight against or for evil are referred to as time warriors.

Mark plans to gather evidence of the reanimated dead to bring back to their world as proof of Sarah's story in court. After jumping from one world to another making little progress, they arrive in a medieval world where Sarah is the sister of the evil sorcerer, Master Scarabis. After foiling Scarabis' plans to take over the throne of England by transmogrifying into the visiting king, he and Mark engage in a sword fight. When Solomon's Locket is accidentally opened, the two fight through various worlds. In one world where a zombie invasion is happening in a mall, Mark slices off a zombie's still-animate hand and keeps it to use as evidence for Sarah's trial. The two wind up back in Scarabis' castle where Mark gets the upper hand, causing the sorcerer to violently die at the hands of a woman who was turned into a grisly panther creature during a ritual to give him his powers.

When Mark and Sarah attempt to return to their universe, the doorway is smaller this time, only allowing one to enter. Mark reasons that Sarah must go through and clear her name, adding that she would never be happy staying in Kartagra. Even though she resists, claiming she would be happy as long as she is with him, Mark sends her through the portal and the two bid a tearful farewell. Sarah returns in Sir Wilfred's secret vault with the zombie hand in tow. She happens upon a partially covered painting she saw earlier and finds it is of Mark, dressed as an armored time warrior.

At the conclusion of her trial, Sarah's incredulous evidence proves her innocence. When leaving the courthouse, a courier delivers her an antiquated package containing Solomon's Locket and a parchment from Mark that reads: "Join me." Sarah happily boards a taxi as the crowd outside watches her disappear in a flash of light.

== Cast ==
- Zach Galligan as Mark Loftmore
- Monika Schnarre as Sarah Brightman
- Martin Kemp as Baron Von Frankenstein
- Bruce Campbell as John Loftmore
- Michael Des Barres as George
- Jim Metzler as Roger
- Sophie Ward as Elenore
- Marina Sirtis as Gloria
- Billy Kane as Nigel
- Joe Baker as The Peasant
- Juliet Mills as The Defense Lawyer
- John Ireland as King Arthur
- Patrick Macnee as Sir Wilfred
- David Carradine as The Beggar
- Alexander Godunov as Scarabis

== Release ==
The film was released in Philippine theaters by Jemah Films on March 26, 1992. Originally intended as a theatrical release in the United States like its predecessor, Waxwork II instead went direct-to-video on June 16, 1992.

== Production ==
Although written by a British writer, the American actors were allowed to speak the dialogue in their own words, replacing common British speech mannerisms with American ones. Many of the anachronisms in the movie were on purpose as a type of Easter egg for the fans

== Reception ==
TV Guide liked this sequel more than the original, and gave it two out of 5 stars, but in the end found "ends up little more than a good idea that needed a steadier hand at the helm." John Stanley's Creature Feature review book found that the movie was worth 3.5 out of 5 stars, and said that it would especially appeal to horror fans.
