= Prince Valiant (1997 film) =

- VHS cover
- Directed by: Anthony Hickox
- Screenplay by: Michael Frost Beckner; Anthony Hickox; Carsten H.W. Lorenz
- Story by: Michael Frost Beckner
- Based on: Prince Valiant by Hal Foster
- Produced by: Tom Rosenberg; James Gorman; Bernd Eichinger
- Starring: Stephen Moyer; Katherine Heigl; Thomas Kretschmann; Edward Fox; Udo Kier; Warwick Davis; Joanna Lumley; Ron Perlman
- Cinematography: Roger Lanser
- Edited by: Alexander Berner
- Music by: David Bergeaud
- Distributed by: Constantin Film (Germany); Entertainment Film Distributors (United Kingdom)
- Release dates: 24 July 1997 (Germany); 19 December 1997 (United Kingdom)
- Running time: 91 minutes
- Countries: Ireland; United Kingdom; Germany
- Language: English
- Budget: $20 million

Prince Valiant is a 1997 independent sword and sorcery film directed by Anthony Hickox, written by Michael Frost Beckner, and starring Stephen Moyer, Katherine Heigl, Thomas Kretschmann, Joanna Lumley, Ron Perlman, and Edward Fox. It is a loose adaptation of the long-running Prince Valiant comic strip of Hal Foster, some panels of which were used in the film. In it, Valiant must battle the Vikings and a scheming sorceress to save the kingdom.

== Plot ==
The story is based on the myth of King Arthur. A young, inexperienced squire Valiant, masquerading as Sir Gawain, is sent to accompany the Welsh princess Lady Ilene, a guest at Camelot, on her way back home. Little does he know that meanwhile, Arthur's wicked sister Morgan has retrieved a spellbook from Merlin's tomb and convinced the Viking warlord Sligon, ruler of the kingdom of Thule, to steal the magical sword Excalibur during a jousting tournament.

Valiant and the princess become part of the struggle of "he who holds the sword rules the world" which leads them both to love and Valiant to his princely destiny, as it turns out he is the rightful heir to the throne of Thule. The usurper is killed by his also evil brother Thagnar. During the final confrontation, with the help of Thule's ruler Boltar, Morgan is destroyed, Thagnar is slain, and Valiant rescues the princess and recovers Excalibur.

== Cast ==
- Stephen Moyer as Prince Valiant
- Katherine Heigl as Princess Ilene
- Thomas Kretschmann as Thagnar
- Edward Fox as King Arthur
- Udo Kier as Sligon
- Joanna Lumley as Morgan le Fay
- Ron Perlman as Boltar
- Warwick Davis as Pechet
- Gavan O'Herlihy as King Thane
- Anthony Hickox as Sir Gawain
- Ben Pullen as Prince Arn
- Marcus Schenkenberg as Tiny

== Production ==
The film was recut by German producer Bernd Eichinger without the knowledge of director Anthony Hickox. In his autobiography Size Matters Not: The Extraordinary Life & Career of Warwick Davis, Warwick Davis, an actor in the film, called it an "absolute disaster" which was "premiered, panned and bombed", and "even the wonderful Joanna Lumley - who still managed to put in an amazing performance as Morgan le Fay - couldn't save it". He blames this on the director, who he says "seemed intent on partying all night long and giving roles to his friends".

== Reception ==
The film was generally poorly received. Empire gave Prince Valiant two stars out of five and wrote that "a promising, swashbuckly romp is entirely scuppered by some indiscriminate broadsword editing, thereby removing any fun the name cast might have had, and leaving a poorly dubbed, effects-lacking film disappointingly limp". Some other reviews, however, were more positive. The Telegraph included it among top ten Arthurian films in 2014.

== See also ==
- Prince Valiant (1954 film)
