= Tom Adams (actor) =

English actor (1938–2014)

- Adams in The Avengers episode Take-Over (1969)
- Born: Anthony Frederick Charles Adams; 9 March 1938; Poplar, London, England
- Died: 11 December 2014 (aged 76); Slough, Berkshire, England
- Occupation: Actor
- Years active: 1961–2002
- Partner: Pamella Lettice Cootes (1975–1980)

Tom Adams (born Anthony Frederick Charles Adams; 9 March 1938 – 11 December 2014) was an English actor with roles in adventure, horror and mystery films, and several TV shows. He was known for his appearance in The Great Escape (1963) and as Daniel Fogarty in several series of The Onedin Line.

== Early life ==
Adams was born in Poplar, London and his father was a commercial chauffeur. After school, he did his national service in the British Army, serving in the Coldstream Guards, then joined the Unity Theatre, London. He adopted the stage name of Tom Adams and taught English and drama at the Cardinal Griffin secondary modern school, Poplar, in the 1960s between acting jobs with repertory companies. He supported and donated a percentage of his wages to the Spina Bifida association and research in memory of his sister who died as a young child and his own daughter Antonia with pamella Cootes who dies age 3 days premature birth and Spina Bifida.

== Career ==
He appeared in television series such as The Avengers, Maigret and Ghost Squad as well as films from 1961 and made his West End debut, supporting Anton Walbrook and Peter Sallis, in Masterpiece at the Royalty in 1961. He joined the Royal Shakespeare Company in 1962 as one of an infusion of new actors into Michael Elliott’s production of As You Like It at the Aldwych Theatre. His first big screen break was a role as Nimmo in The Great Escape (1963), in which the salary from the film allowed him to buy his first car.

He starred as the lead of a film series featuring a low budget imitation James Bond named Charles Vine in three films beginning with Licensed to Kill (aka The Second Best Secret Agent in the Whole Wide World, 1965) and the sequels Where the Bullets Fly (1966) and Somebody's Stolen Our Russian Spy (aka "O.K. Yevtushenko" 1967) that was shot in Spain. He was the second male lead in the 1966 Disney film The Fighting Prince of Donegal after he replaced Mark Eden who broke his ankle during the film's shooting and menaced Raquel Welch in Fathom.

Adams' television credits include Emergency Ward 10 where he played Dr Guy Marshall from 1964 to 1967 and later the similar Dr Guy Wallman in General Hospital between 1975 and 1978; starred as Major Sullivan in the BBC counter-espionage drama Spy Trap from 1973 to 1975, The Onedin Line as Daniel Fogarty (1977–79); Doctor Who as Vorshak in Warriors of the Deep (1984); and Emmerdale Farm (1987) as Malcolm Bates. He took the lead in The Enigma Files in 1980.

During the late 1970s, he appeared in TV commercials for Dixons, and for many years in the 1980s and 1990s he was the face of the furniture store chain DFS/Northern Upholstery. In 2011, he was seen in a series of commercials advertising the Aero Biscuit, and he later appeared in an ad for Stannah Stairlifts and Hyundai. He was noted as a voice-over artist, and became the continuity announcer for UK television channel, E4.

A keen golfer, he authored a 1996 book of short stories Shakespeare Was a Golfer: A Collection of Golfing Shorts.

== Death ==
Adams died on 11 December 2014 at the age of 76 at Wexham Park Hospital in Berkshire, of cancer.

== TV and filmography ==
- A Chance of Thunder (1961, TV series) .... Evans
- The Avengers (1961–1969, TV Series) .... PC Butterworth / Rayner / Grenville
- A Pair of Briefs (1962) .... Wheelchair attendant (uncredited)
- Play It Cool (1962) .... Reporter #2 (uncredited)
- A Prize of Arms (1962) .... Corporal Glenn
- The Great Escape (1963) .... Dai Nimmo, "Diversions"
- This Is My Street (1964) .... Paul
- Emergency Ward 10 (1964, TV Series) .... Mr. Guy Marshall
- The Peaches (1964, British short subject) .... The Boy
- Z-Cars (1965, TV Series) .... Steve
- R3 (1965, TV Series) .... John Rawlins
- Licensed to Kill (1965) .... Charles Vine
- The Spies (1966, TV Series) .... Stefan
- Where the Bullets Fly (1966) .... Charles Vine
- The Fighting Prince of Donegal (1966) .... Henry O'Neill
- Fathom (1967) .... Mike
- Subterfuge (1968) .... Peter Langley
- O.K. Yevtushenko (1968) .... Charles Vine
- Journey to Midnight (1968) .... Jerry Crown (segment "The Indian Spirit Guide")
- Strange Report (1969, TV Series) .... Clinton
- UFO (1970, Episode: "The Psychobombs") .... Captain Lauritzen
- The House That Dripped Blood (1970) .... Richard / Dominic (segment 1 "Method for Murder")
- Von Richthofen and Brown aka The Red Baron (1971) .... Owen
- The Persuaders!, ('The Time and the Place', episode) (1971, TV Series) .... Piers Emerson
- The Fast Kill (1972) .... Max Stein
- The Daredevil Men (1972, British short subject) .... Unidentified leading man
- Dixon of Dock Green (1972–1976, TV Series) .... Charlie Mann / Johnny Orwell / Jack Montelbetti
- Madigan (1972–1973, TV Series) .... Detective Jaqueta
- Spy Trap (1973) .... Major Sullivan
- General Hospital (1975–1978, TV Series) .... Dr. Guy Wallman
- The Onedin Line (1977–1979, TV Series) .... Daniel Fogarty
- The Enigma Files (1980, TV Series) .... Det Chief Insp Nick Lewis
- Doctor Who (1984, TV Series) .... Commander Vorshak
- Remington Steele (1984, TV Series) .... Richard Moreland
- Strike It Rich! (1986–1987, TV Series) .... Ken Stevenson
- Pyrates (1991) .... John Rackham (uncredited)
- Focus North (1999, TV Series) .... Tom Whitelamb
- Day of the Sirens (2002) .... Chat Show Host (final film role)
